= Air raid on Ceylon (9 April 1942) =

WWII battle in Ceylon between Britain and Japan

- Part of the Indian Ocean raid of the Second World War
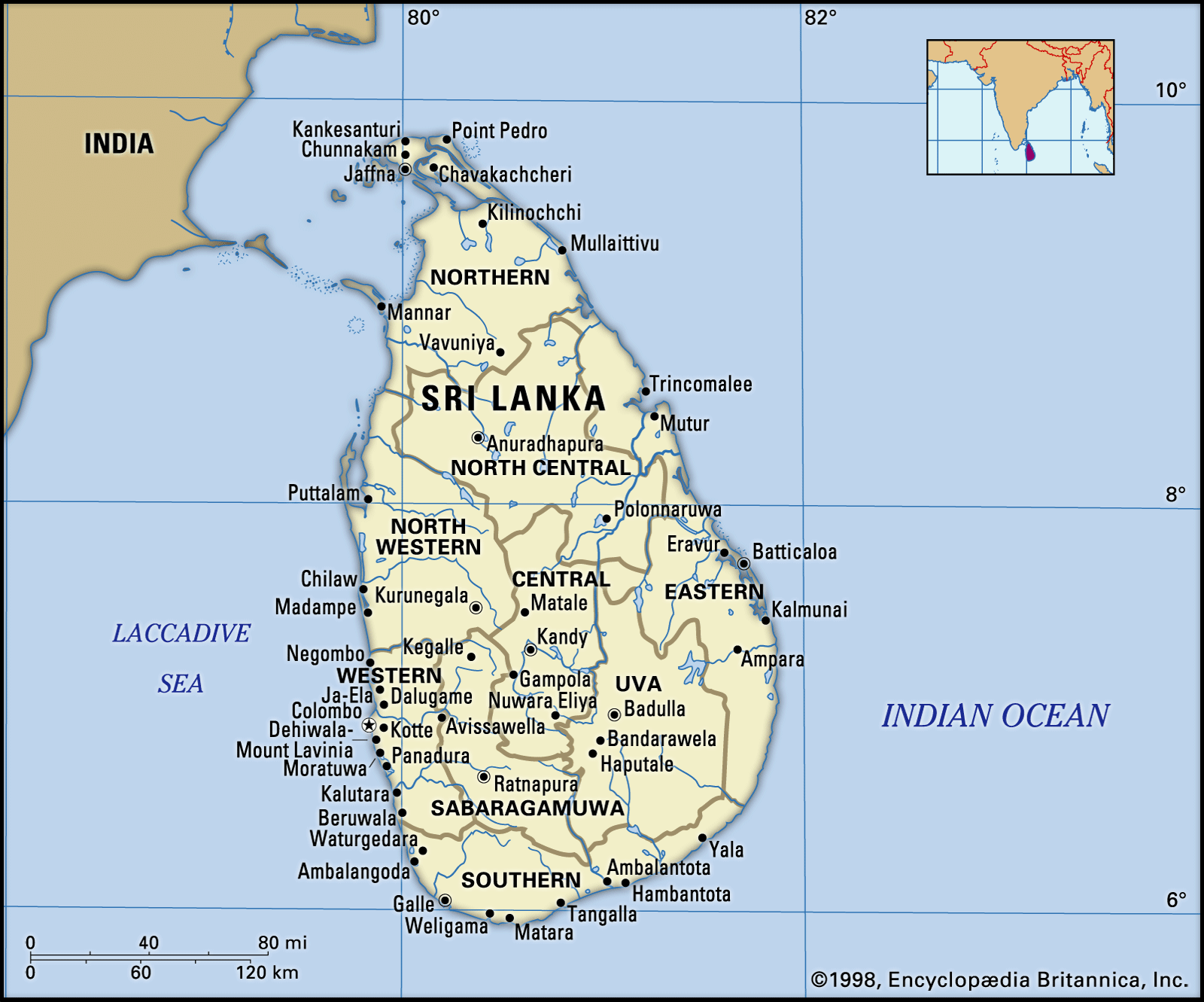
- Map of Ceylon (Sri Lanka)
| Date | 9 April 1942 |
| Location | Trincomalee, British Ceylon 08°34′01″N 81°13′52″E |
| Result | Japanese victory |

Belligerents
| (Empire of Japan) Japan | United Kingdom; British Ceylon; Canada; Netherlands |

Casualties and losses
| 9 aircraft | 33 aircraft; 6 ships |
- Trincomalee on Trincomalee Bay on the north-eastern coast of Sri Lanka

The Air raid on Ceylon (9 April 1942) was an air attack on Trincomalee, British Ceylon (now Sri Lanka) during the Indian Ocean raid (31 March – 10 April 1942) by naval aircraft of the 1st Carrier Fleet of the Imperial Japanese Navy. The Japanese objective was to destroy the Eastern Fleet in harbour.

The British had received warning of the raid through decrypted Japanese wireless messages in March 1942, from later air reconnaissance and by radar. The British forestalled the Japanese Navy by dispersing shipping from Trincomalee before the attack. The Japanese aircraft were met by fighters of 222 Group, Royal Air Force, the Fleet Air Arm and anti-aircraft guns.

Port facilities at Trincomalee were damaged, SS Sagaing was set on fire and others were damaged. The bulk of the Eastern Fleet was at sea and escaped but several ships, including the aircraft carrier HMS Hermes, were spotted and sunk. The Eastern Fleet moved temporarily to East Africa, from where it sent carrier forces into the central and eastern Indian Ocean. The Japanese Navy was unable to repeat the raid because of its commitments in the Pacific.

== Background ==
=== British Ceylon (Sri Lanka) ===
Ceylon (now Sri Lanka) is off the south-east of India between shipping routes from Singapore and Rangoon to the Red Sea and the Persian Gulf. There are natural harbours at Colombo on the south-western coast and Trincomalee on the north-eastern coast, a naval anchorage and base. Ceylon was a geographically important part of the British Empire and its system of trade, communication and military organisation. In the 1930s more shipping tonnage was handled in Ceylon than all the ports of India. Since the beginning of the Second World War, the colonial government had engaged in mass recruitment for local defence, overseas labouring and expanded food production. Tea and rubber production was emphasised and rubber output rose from 99,500 long tons (101,100 t) in 1941 to 105,500 long tons (107,200 t) in 1943. The 3,600 workers in civil engineering converted to the repair and refitting of ships and the manufacture of dummy aircraft, guns and radar installations.

When the Pacific War began on 7 December 1941, the Allied disasters in the Pacific, Malaya and the British débâcle at the Battle of Singapore in February 1942 made Colombo Harbour the basis for eastern trade and the centre for the assembly of Indian Ocean convoys. Colombo port was large enough for 45 ships but soon had 100 to 110 ships at once, causing much overcrowding. The strategic importance of Ceylon increased and British planners deemed the island essential to the defence of India and Allied lines of communication through the Indian Ocean. The Allied defeat in the Dutch East Indies campaign (11 January – 9 March 1942) left the Indian Ocean vulnerable to Japanese attacks. The Malacca Strait in the Netherlands East Indies was about 1,000 nmi (1,900 km; 1,200 mi) east of Trincomalee, making Ceylon a useful base for attacks on Japanese ships sailing to Rangoon in Burma.

From September to December 1941, 710 troop reinforcements arrived on the island, followed from January to March 1942, another 2,612; during April and June, 2,112 more troops joined the garrison (2,872) and 4,993 troops moved between the Far East and Ceylon from October 1941 to March 1942. The extent of the disasters that befell the British in early 1942, led in March to Admiral Sir Geoffrey Layton being installed as the Commander-in-Chief, Ceylon, with authority over the military forces on the island and over the civilian governor, Sir Andrew Caldecott, "Do not ask permission to do things. Do them and report afterwards what you have done". Layton found the same complacency and inertia in Ceylon as he had experienced in Malaya,

...he takes complete charge of Ceylon and stands no nonsense from anyone.... He pulls all the Ministers legs... and they work for him all the harder.

— Admiral Somerville

=== 222 Group RAF ===
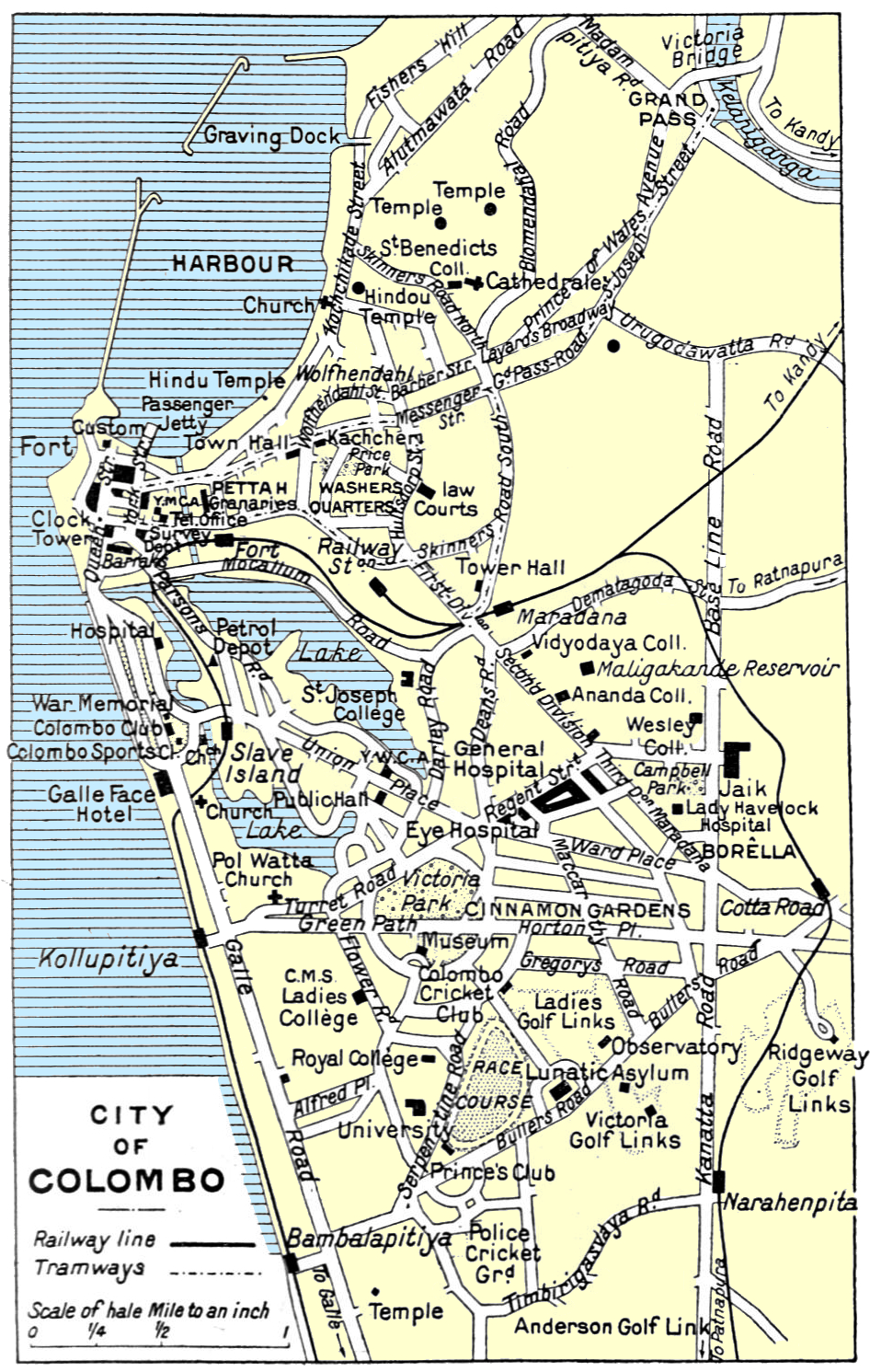
1930 diagram of Colombo and the harbour

In September 1941 the Royal Air Force (RAF) established 222 Group (Air Vice-Marshal John D'Albiac) on the island in command of 273 Squadron at China Bay airfield with four Vickers Vildebeest and four Fairey Seal torpedo bombers. Until February 1942, the air defence of Ceylon had been a Royal Navy responsibility and 803 Naval Air Squadron (803 NAS) and 806 Naval Air Squadron (806 NAS) had transferred to Ceylon from the Middle East, six Fairey Fulmars at a time. Eight Hurricanes that had been assembled at Karachi, were flown to Ceylon, six of the Hurricanes, ferried to Ceylon by pilots of 136 Squadron, arrived at RAF Ratmalana on 23 February.

788 Naval Air Squadron (788 NAS) the Torpedo Bomber Reconnaissance Pool, with six Fairey Swordfish, for the Eastern Fleet (Vice-Admiral Sir James Somerville) was formed on 18 January at China Bay, near Trincomalee and was pressed into service in defence of Ceylon. By March 1942, airfields existed at China Bay, Ratmalana near Colombo, an airstrip was built at the Colombo Racecourse to relieve congestion at Ratmalana and another had been built at Minneriya on the south coast. China Bay was a grass landing ground that had the sea at both ends and there was a ridge along the southern edge; a low ridge ran along the northern boundary. Aircraft could only land and take off to the north-east or south-west, depending on the wind direction. There were fuel storage tanks beyond the north-east corner of the airfield at the Royal Naval Base Trincomalee.

Anti-aircraft defence comprised four obsolescent QF 3-inch 20 cwt anti-aircraft guns at Trincomalee. The danger of an attack by aircraft of the Japanese Navy aircraft-carriers was acute after the Attack on Pearl Harbor in December 1941 and the Bombing of Darwin in February 1942. The airfields at Ratmalana, near Colombo and China Bay were expanded to make room for more aircraft. Throughout the period, the Japanese were unaware of the bases at the Colombo Racecourse and Koggala.

=== Aircraft reinforcements ===
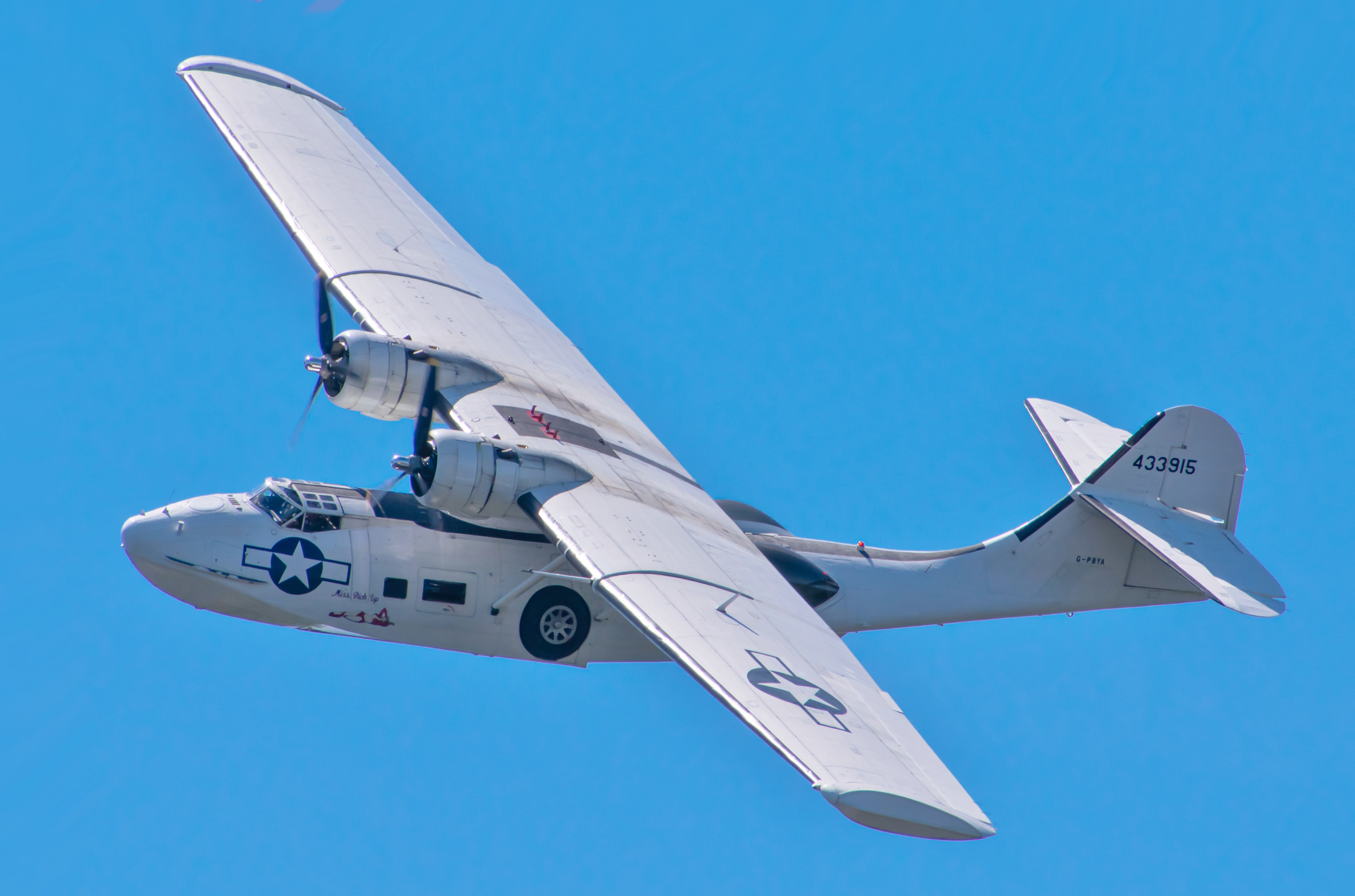
Example of a Catalina flying boat

On 6 and 7 March the aircraft carrier HMS Indomitable dispatched sixty Hurricanes of 30 Squadron and 261 Squadron, originally intended for Java. On 30 March, the RAF reconstituted 258 Squadron that had been mauled in the fighting in British Malaya, Sumatra and Java. By 4 April, 803 NAS and 806 NAS of the Fleet Air Arm were ready with 24 Fulmars; the ground defences had been reinforced to 144 anti-aircraft guns. On 5 April, there were 37–38 serviceable Hurricanes near Colombo.

The first Consolidated PBY Catalina long-range flying boat of 413 Squadron Royal Canadian Air Force (RCAF) arrived on 28 March, with the ground crews following on by sea, two more arrived before the raid and on 6 and 7 April two more Canadian Catalinas arrived. By 4 April, four 205 Squadron RAF Catalinas had reached the island. There was one operational Dutch Catalina of the Netherlands Naval Aviation Service (MLD); two of the RAF and three Dutch Catalinas were unserviceable. The Catalinas were based at Koggala lagoon, at the south end of the island.

=== British code-breaking ===
On 4 December 1941 the Japanese had altered their code JN-25B that prevented British code-breakers of the Far East Combined Bureau (FECB) from reading Japanese wireless messages. On 3 March 1942, the British broke JN-25B messages again. By the middle of the month, decrypts revealed that the 1st Carrier Squadron and the 2nd Carrier Squadron were at Staring Bay in the Celebes, an Imperial Japanese Navy fuelling base and that the 5th Carrier Squadron was en route. Around 20 March, decrypts revealed that a carrier force in Area D was going to attack DG on 2 April (C Day). On 28 March the FECB inferred that DG was Colombo. Japanese preparations were delayed by the late arrival of the 5th Carrier Squadron at Staring Bay on 24 March and the fleet sailed 26 March.

The British air defences in Ceylon were alerted to be ready for an attack on 1 or 2 March and merchant shipping was dispersed from Colombo. The Eastern Fleet sortied on 30 March to patrol 100 mi (160 km) south of the island. Aerial reconnaissance by Catalina flying boats concentrated on the south-east, the right direction that the Japanese would approach but with no sightings. The Eastern Fleet retired late on 2 April toward Addu Atoll to refuel at Gan (Port T) about 600 nmi (1,100 km; 690 mi) south-west of Ceylon. HMS Cornwall and Dorsetshire two County-class cruisers, sailed for Colombo, Cornwall to resume its refit and Dorsetshire to escort a troop convoy. HMS Hermes set out for Trincomalee.

=== Radar ===
Radar stations, code-named Air Ministry Experimental Stations (AMES) were established at Colombo (AMES 254) whose personnel arrived on 18 March and its equipment four days later. The station became operational at the Royal Colombo Golf Club (about 6 mi (9.7 km) north of Ratmalana) on 25 March and was connected by telephone to No. 20 Operations Room on 28 March; AMES 272 was set up at Trincomalee. The terrain around the radar limited maximum range to 60 mi (97 km) and the altitude of an object affected detection range. The short time that AMES 254 had been in Colombo may not have been sufficient to train operators to identify false radar echoes produced by local conditions; real echoes may have been mistaken for false ones. The radar antenna projected "lobes" in which objects might be detected, with gaps between lobes or lobes overlapping. The trajectory of the incoming Japanese aircraft may have flown in gaps between lobes. The distance travelled by Japanese aircraft between the maximum range of AMES 254 to Ratmalana was 54 mi (87 km) It took about 17 minutes flying time for a Japanese Zero and five minutes for Hurricanes to take off and six to climb to interception altitude. There were only six minutes for AMES 254 to report to 20 Operations Room and for orders to be issued to pilots if they were going to avoid being caught climbing.

=== Japanese preparations ===
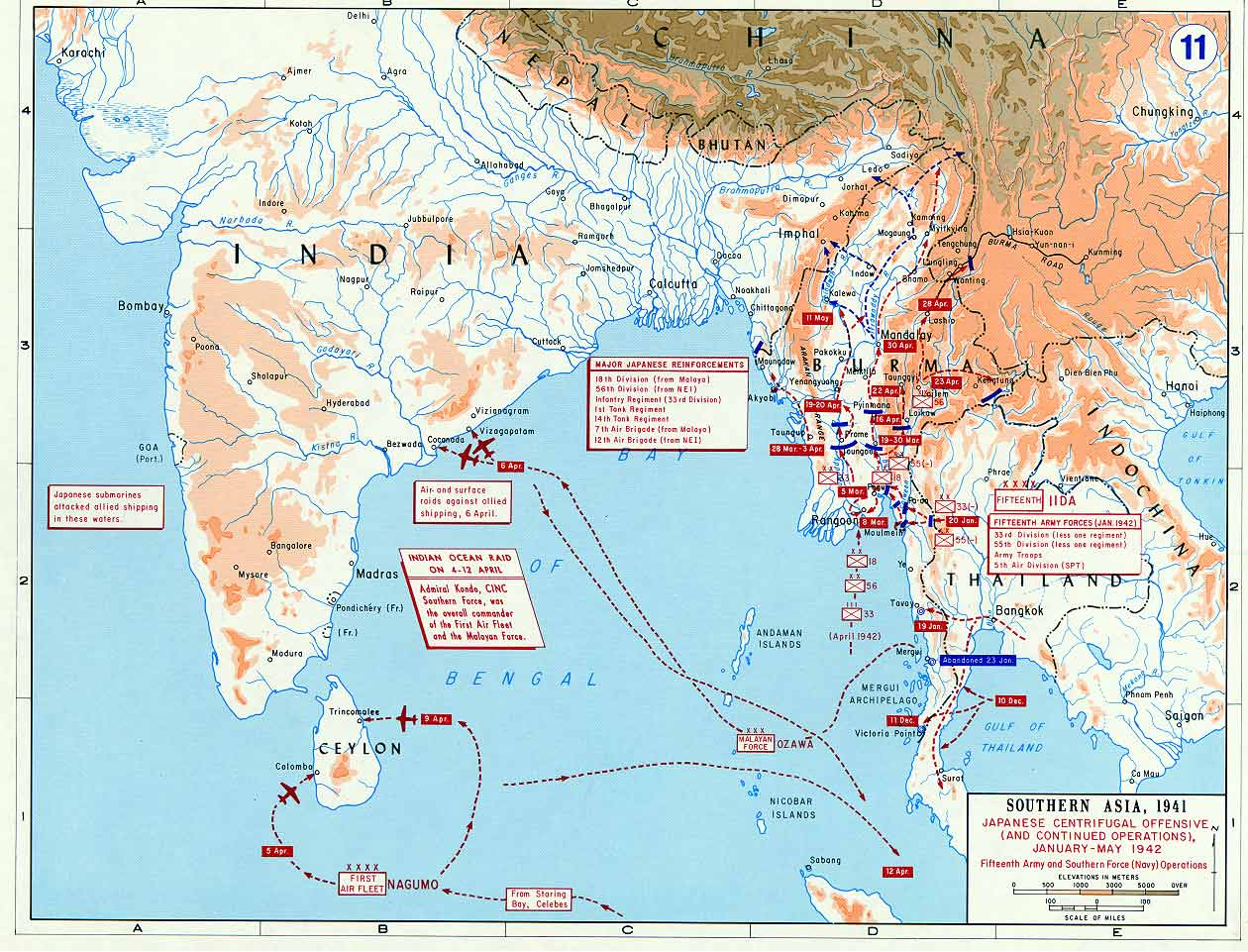
The Indian Ocean raid of the Japanese Southern Force (31 March to 10 April 1942)

The Japanese began planning for operations in the Indian Ocean on 14 February 1942. By 21 February, the Southern Army Commander, General Terauchi Hisaichi, and Vice Admiral Ozawa had come to terms. Once the Strait of Malacca had been cleared of mines (late February – early March) Operation T, a landing in northern Sumatra would begin. About twenty days after the end of the minesweeping operation, Operation D, the invasion of the Andaman Islands.

Operation U was the transport of two Japanese army divisions from Singapore and Penang to Rangoon in Burma. Land-based naval air units would transfer to Bangkok for air support. It was thought necessary to forestall British naval reinforcements to the Indian Ocean and the Japanese Admiralty and the Combined Fleet devised a scheme for a raid into the Indian Ocean against the Eastern Fleet in Ceylon. The Striking Force was in the area operating against the Dutch East Indies.

On 9 March 1942 the Southern Force (Admiral Chūichi Nagumo) received orders to protect Japanese sea communications from attack by the British army in Burma and to "sweep the Bay of Bengal clear of British naval units", ready for the occupation of the Andaman Islands and the Nicobar Islands in the eastern Indian Ocean. In February 1942, the Japanese army and navy conducted a war game to examine an invasion of Ceylon but both services were lukewarm. The army did not have the troops for an invasion and occupation; the navy was preoccupied with its operations in the Pacific.

There were insufficient ships to shift an invasion force and to supply a garrison against attacks by British ships, submarines and aircraft. The Prime Minister, Hideki Tojo, rejected the plan indefinitely. By 16 March, the plan for an Indian Ocean raid was to depart from Staring Bay in the Celebes (now Sulawesi) in the Netherlands East Indies on 26 March, ready to attack Colombo on 5 April (C day). The Southern Force was based on the five aircraft carriers of the 1st Air Fleet, comprising Akagi of the 1st Carrier Squadron, Sōryū and Hiryū of the 2nd Carrier Squadron, with Shōkaku and Zuikaku of the 5th Carrier Squadron. (Note: The force had 23 seaplanes, the light cruiser Abukuma carried a Kawanishi E7K (Alf) three-seat biplane. The heavy cruisers Tone and Chikuma each had one Kawanishi E7K and three Nakajima E8N (Dave) two-seater biplanes and an Aichi E13A (Jake) monoplane seaplane. The battleships Kongo, Haruna, Kirishima and Hiei carried three Nakajima E8N each.)

== Prelude ==
=== 2−6 April ===
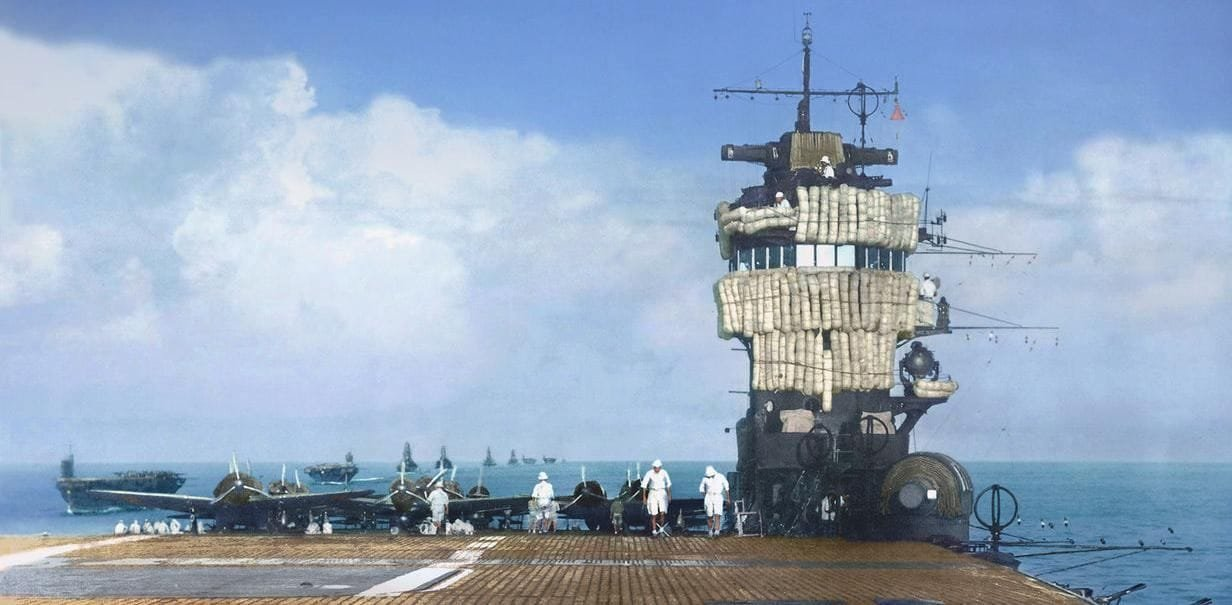
The deck of the Japanese aircraft carrier Akagi before the Indian Ocean raid

During the morning of 2 April, three Kawanishi H6K (Mavis) flying boats from Port Blair made a reconnaissance flight towards Ceylon and early on 4 April, an H6K was sent to Trincomalee, observing eight merchant ships and a destroyer in the harbour. The Japanese attacked Colombo on 5 April and the British lost 27 aircraft, 17 Hurricanes (two repairable) and several Hurricanes damaged, six Swordfish were shot down and four FAA Fulmars were lost. The Fleet Air Arm pilots of 803 NAS and 806 NAS claimed one Japanese aircraft shot down for a loss of three pilots killed and four Fulmars shot down. The Japanese lost seven aircraft shot down, a Zero and six Vals were shot down, three Zeros, seven Vals and five Kates were damaged. At Ceylon, 30 Squadron was reduced to seven operational Hurricanes and 258 Squadron to three Mark IIbs and two Mark Is.

Catalinas from Ceylon and Albacores from the Eastern Fleet flew reconnaissance sorties all day. Catalina FV-R of 205 Squadron reported the Japanese fleet before being shot down. Two 827 NAS Albacores were attacked and one was shot one down, the other Albacore escaping into cloud and later, a third Albacore was attacked and damaged but escaped. Aircraft from Japanese cruisers searched the area south of Ceylon for British ships expected to be fleeing from Ceylonese ports. Cornwall was heading for Colombo to resume its refit and Dorsetshire to escort a troop convoy. At 11:00 Dorsetshire and Cornwall were found to the south-east of the Southern Force. The 2nd Carrier Squadron attacked with 53 Vals, sinking Dorsetshire at 14:48 and Cornwall six minutes later. In the afternoon, Catalina L of 240 Squadron spotted the Japanese fleet 240 nmi (440 km; 280 mi) out from Ceylon, on course for Trincomalee and managed to shadow the fleet until forced to return by fuel shortage. Contact with the Southern Force was lost. At dusk, Eastern Fleet Albacores spotted a carrier and lost it again.

=== 6–8 April ===
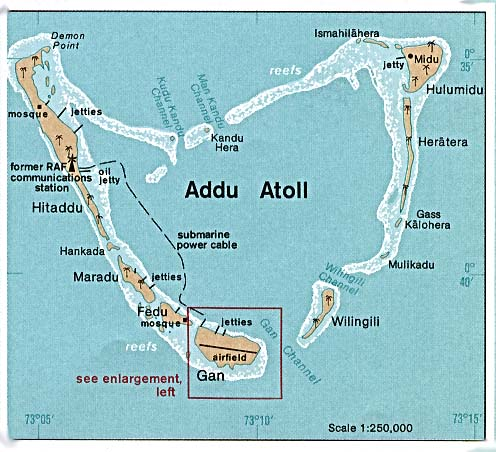
Map of Addu Atoll (Port T)

At dawn on 6 April, Swordfish were sent on an armed reconnaissance escorted by Fulmars from 273 Squadron but nothing was found. During the early morning a floatplane from the cruiser Tone spotted a Catalina and three Kates sent to intercept failed to find it. In the afternoon the Japanese fleet began slowly to turn onto a north-westerly course for Trincomalee. British search efforts were to the south, misled by exaggerated claims of severe Japanese aircraft losses that the Japanese would be returning to the Netherlands East Indies. On 7 April, five Blenheims from 11 Squadron took off to search for the Japanese aircraft carriers but found nothing. Swordfish torpedo-bombers, with their Fulmar escorts from 273 Squadron, resumed searching for the Japanese ships. Two experienced pilots in 261 Squadron were killed in a crash when taking off from Kokkilai and three Hurricanes were damaged in landing accidents.

On 8 April, Somerville realised that the number of aircraft that raided Colombo had come from more aircraft carriers than the expected two. Conservation of the Eastern Fleet took precedence and the fleet turned south-west for Port T (Addu Atoll). At 15:17 a Catalina reported three battleships and an aircraft carrier at 6°10'N, 88°49'E, about 540 nmi (1,000 km; 620 mi) from Colombo, on a course of 330° then hid from Zeros in cloud an hour later, losing contact. Catalina QL-Y found the Japanese fleet at 07:16 on 9 April, reporting its course, range and speed before being shot down and the crew killed.

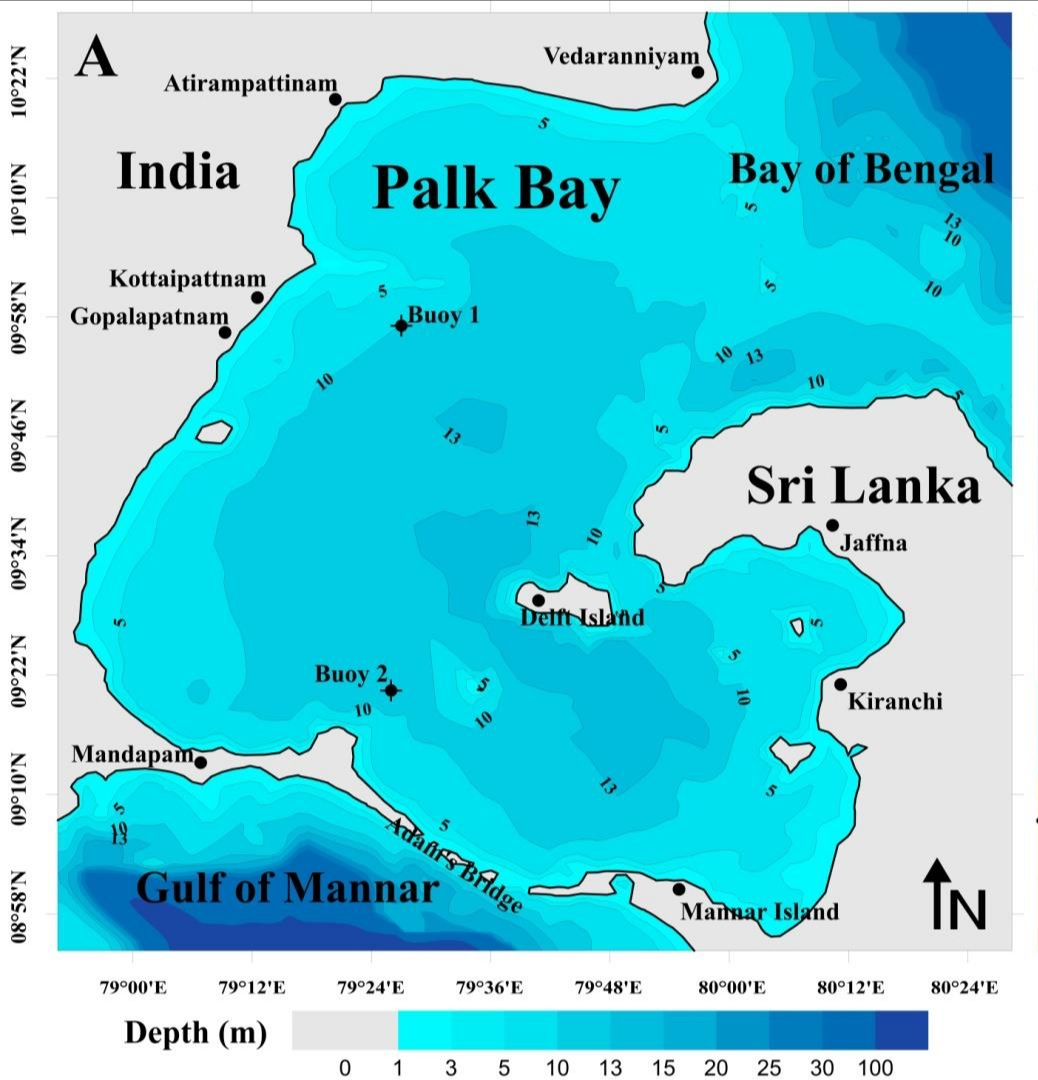
Outline of the Palk Strait to the north-west of Ceylon (Sri Lanka)

Vice-Admiral Geoffrey Arbuthnot (commander-in-chief East Indies Station) predicted that shipping would be the main Japanese target as in the Colombo raid on 5 April and there were insufficient fighters to guard the harbour. Dispersal had worked at Colombo but instead of repeating the northwards direction, they were ordered south because the Japanese might predict the move and because the Palk Strait already had 22 freighters that might have been spotted by the Japanese.

Arbuthnot ordered the aircraft carrier Hermes, the destroyer HMAS Vampire, a corvette, a minelayer, three tankers and four naval auxiliaries at Trincomalee to head south to be at least 40 nmi (74 km; 46 mi) distant from Trincomalee as the sun rose. By dawn on 9 April, the ships in harbour included the monitor HMS Erebus, that had radar and six 3-inch anti-aircraft guns, in use as a flak ship, the Netherlands Java-class cruiser HNLMS Sumatra that was being refitted and could not sail, eight small naval ships, auxiliary vessels and nine merchant ships of at least 3,000 GRT.

=== 9 April ===
==== Trincomalee ====
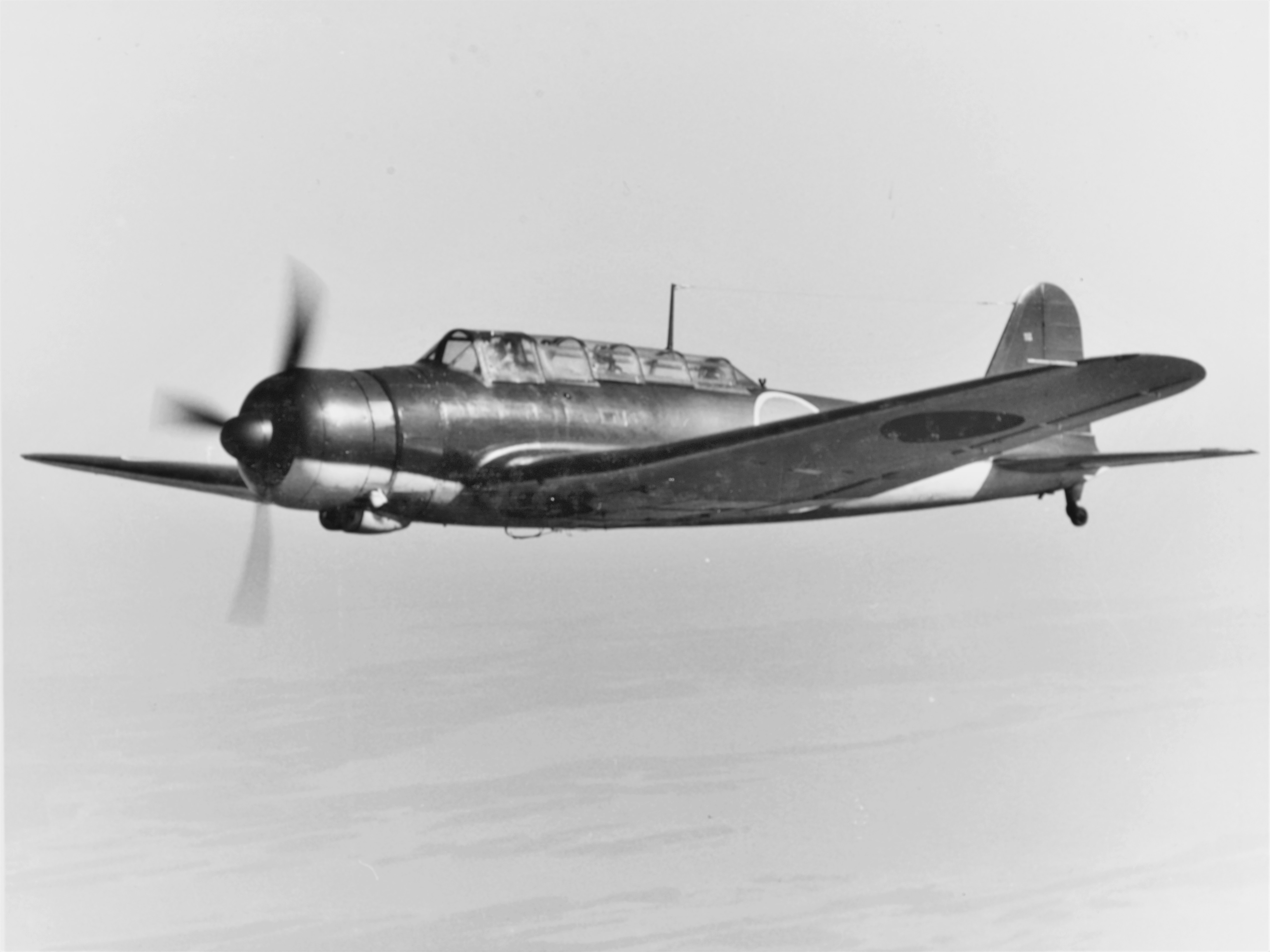
Nakajima B5N2 (Kate)

At 06:00 the Kidō Butai was 200 nmi (370 km; 230 mi) to the east of Trincomalee when 91Kates, carrying 1,800 lb (800 kg) bombs, with 38 Zero escorts took off. A second attack force of 85 Vals with nine Zero escorts stayed behind to attack the Eastern Fleet if it appeared. The battleships Haruna, Hiei, Kirishima and Kongo and the cruisers Chikuma and Abukuma launched a seaplane apiece to reconnoitre around the fleet. At Trincomalee, the detection of the Japanese the day before meant that there was no surprise and the defences went on the alert early in the morning. At 05:19 AMES 272, the radar at Elizabeth Point, detected aircraft 15 to 30 nmi (28 to 56 km; 17 to 35 mi) distant bearing 60°–100° and the alert was sounded soon afterwards. No aircraft appeared and the pilots of 261 Squadron stood down at 06:35. At 07:06 another radar contact was obtained of aircraft 91 nmi (169 km; 105 mi) away on a bearing of 78° and at 07:18 alerts were sounded.

At 07:00, Catalina QL-Y of 413 Squadron RCAF, from Koggala on reconnaissance, reported many ships, steering 330°, 205 nmi (380 km; 236 mi) from Trincomalee on a bearing of 261°. Contact was lost and the British assumed that it had been shot down; at 07:08 two Zeros from Hiryū had shot it down with no survivors. Three Hurricanes from 261 Squadron had taken off from China Bay on dawn patrol at 06:35 and twenty minutes later were directed out to sea. When the Hurricanes were 30 nmi (56 km; 35 mi) out from the coast, they saw two formations of bombers at 14,800 ft (4,500 m) with many Zeros overhead. The Hurricanes climbed to 22,000 ft (6,700 m) undetected by the Zeros and got behind a section of the Zeros. The Hurricane section leader shot down a Zero that fell out of formation, disintegrated and hit the sea. An Australian pilot shot down another Zero in flames. The section leader Hurricane gained height but was attacked by two Zeros. The third Hurricane was quickly shot down. The Australian pilot went back up to 13,000 ft (4,000 m) and saw 20 Kates, only to be wounded and his aircraft damaged by British anti-aircraft fire. On landing back to China Bay he was strafed by Zero and crashed on the runway, to be saved by another pilot, who dragged him from the wreckage. Only the leader was left, who met the second formation lower down at 6,900 ft (2,100 m). He got behind a Zero and shot it down into the sea, about 5 nmi (9.3 km; 5.8 mi) to the south-east of Foul Point.

At 07:20 Mitsuo Fuchida, the raid commander, gave the order to attack, just as another flight of six 261 Squadron Hurricanes took off from China Bay, followed by another six from Kokkilai. At 07:30 the Kates from Hiryū and Sōryū reached the harbour, followed by those from Akagi. The Hurricanes climbed to 22,000 ft (6,700 m), the first flight splitting into two sections, one orbiting China Bay and the other flying to the port. The section at China Bay could not find the bombers until they had bombed and turned for home. The Hurricanes made a firing pass and were engaged by five Zeros, that shot down one of the Hurricanes and damaged the other two, that had to make forced landings, the three pilots being unwounded. The second section was attacked by two Zeros over the port at 14,800 ft (4,500 m) and one of the Hurricane pilots claimed one shot down into the bay. Soon afterwards, he got behind a Zero that was behind a Hurricane and shot it down into a lagoon only to be attacked by two Zeros, damaged and force-landed at China Bay. The two wingmen attacked several Kates while pursued by Zeros, that shot down one of the Hurricanes, the pilot parachuting to safety; the third Hurricane pilot was shot down into the sea and killed.

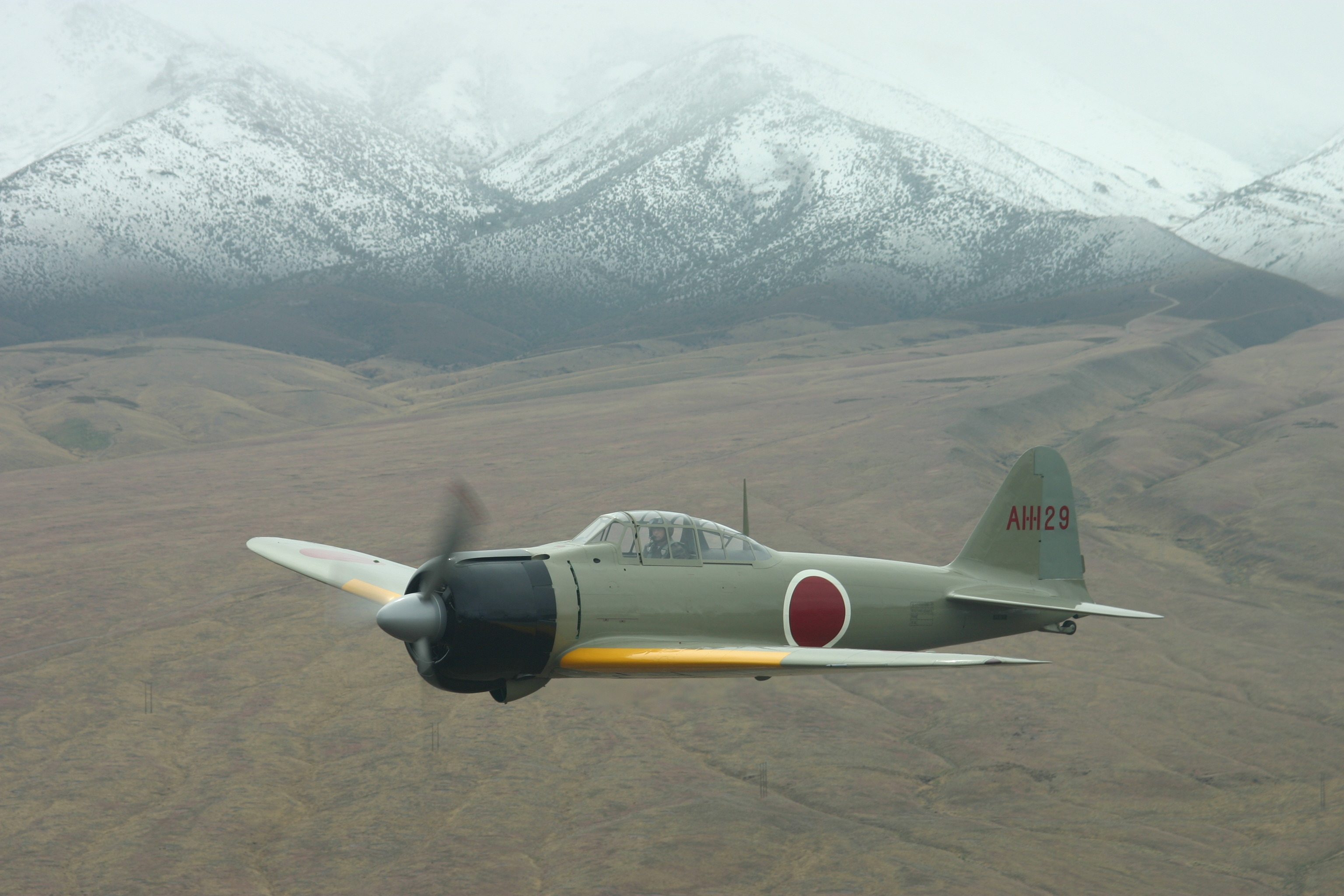
Modern photograph of a Japanese Mitsubishi A6M Zero

The flight from Kokkilai was warned that the Kates were at higher altitude and a section of three Hurricanes climbed to 16,000 ft (5,000 m) and saw the port being bombed but could not see the bombers. The flight lost 4,900 ft (1,500 m) of altitude and saw Kate bombers but were bounced by five Zeros before they could attack. The section commander managed to land and claimed a Zero, helped by his two wingmen attacking the Zeros, one Hurricane went into a spin and the pilot bailed out and landed in a bay. The second Hurricane section, led by a US RCAF pilot, came upon 12 Kates without escorts at 1,600 ft (500 m) and damaged the leader. Attacking again, he hit another Kate in the fuel tank then ran out of ammunition and returned to Kokkilai. One of the wingmen damaged a Kate and was then wounded in the face and turned for home. The second wingman damaged a Kate then climbed to 8,900 ft (2,700 m), seeing 20 Zeros about 18 nmi (33 km; 21 mi) out from the coast and attacked them being shot down in flames but managing to parachute to the ground and be rushed to hospital.

At 07:30 the main force of Kates arrived over Trincomalee, those from Sōryū bombing first, followed by the Kates from Hiryū, Akagi and Zuikaku. After twenty minutes, when the bombing had shifted to China Bay airfield and the harbour facilities, a battleship (the monitor Erebus) was reported in the harbour and at 08:30 the last Kates, from Shōkaku, turned for home. Most of the bombs at Trincomalee had fallen on the docks, destroying warehouses, workshops and cranes along with an oil tank, hit by a crashing bomber, that had apparently been hit by anti-aircraft fire. In the harbour, the freighter Sagaing (7,958 GRT) had a Supermarine Walrus on deck and three dismantled Albacores as deck cargo. There was ammunition for the Hurricanes in the holds and it was hit twice, set on fire and beached; five members of the crew were killed and the rest abandoned ship as it listed to starboard then began to explode below decks, the wreck drifting into Malay Cove; the unexploded munitions and aircraft being ferried as deck cargo were later recovered. Erebus was near-missed six times to starboard; nine men were killed and 22 wounded several of whom died later. The Netherlands cruiser HNLMS Sumatra was hit once by a dud and the Greek freighter SS Marionga D. Thermiotis, en route to Colombo, 12 nmi (22 km; 14 mi) south of Trincomalee was strafed by Zeros, wounding seven members of the crew.

Of the 16 operational Hurricanes in 261 Squadron, 15 got airborne before the raiders arrived, followed by one Hurricane that was immediately bounced by two Zeros and shot down, the pilot surviving but with severe burns. The squadron lost eight Hurricanes shot down and an unserviceable Hurricane was destroyed, the Orderly Room was demolished and a petrol bowser with 700 imp gal (3,200 L; 840 US gal) went up in flames. Five Mk II and a Mk I Hurricane remained serviceable. Having been outnumbered so badly, only two pilots were killed, five being wounded for claims of 14 aircraft shot down, 14 probables and three damaged. The Fulmars of 273 Squadron and the two Martlets of 888 Naval Air Squadron were kept on the ground in reserve. Some of the Kates had attacked 990 Squadron a balloon unit, destroying a balloon and killing three men. Five troops were killed at the pom-pom guns of Navy HQ and Fort Fredrick. The pilots of 261 Squadron claimed four Kates and four Zeros (two having collided) a Kate and three Zeros as probables, five Kates and a Zero damaged.

The Japanese aircraft had landed on their aircraft carriers by 09:30 and according to Japanese reports, two Zeros from Zuikaku and one from Shōkaku had been shot down and a Kate lost from Hiryū. Some damage had been caused to six Zeros and eleven Kates and one Kate from Hiryū landed with a dead gunner and wireless operator; a wireless operator Shōkaku coming back wounded. The Japanese aircrews claimed 38 Hurricanes and three other aircraft shot down and four destroyed on the ground. The Kate crews claimed a Leander-class cruiser (the monitor Erebus) two big and one small freighters at the harbour and dockyard facilities, docks, anti-aircraft gun batteries, warehouses, fuel storage tanks, messes, headquarters and at China Bay the runways and may of the buildings.

==== 11 Squadron ====
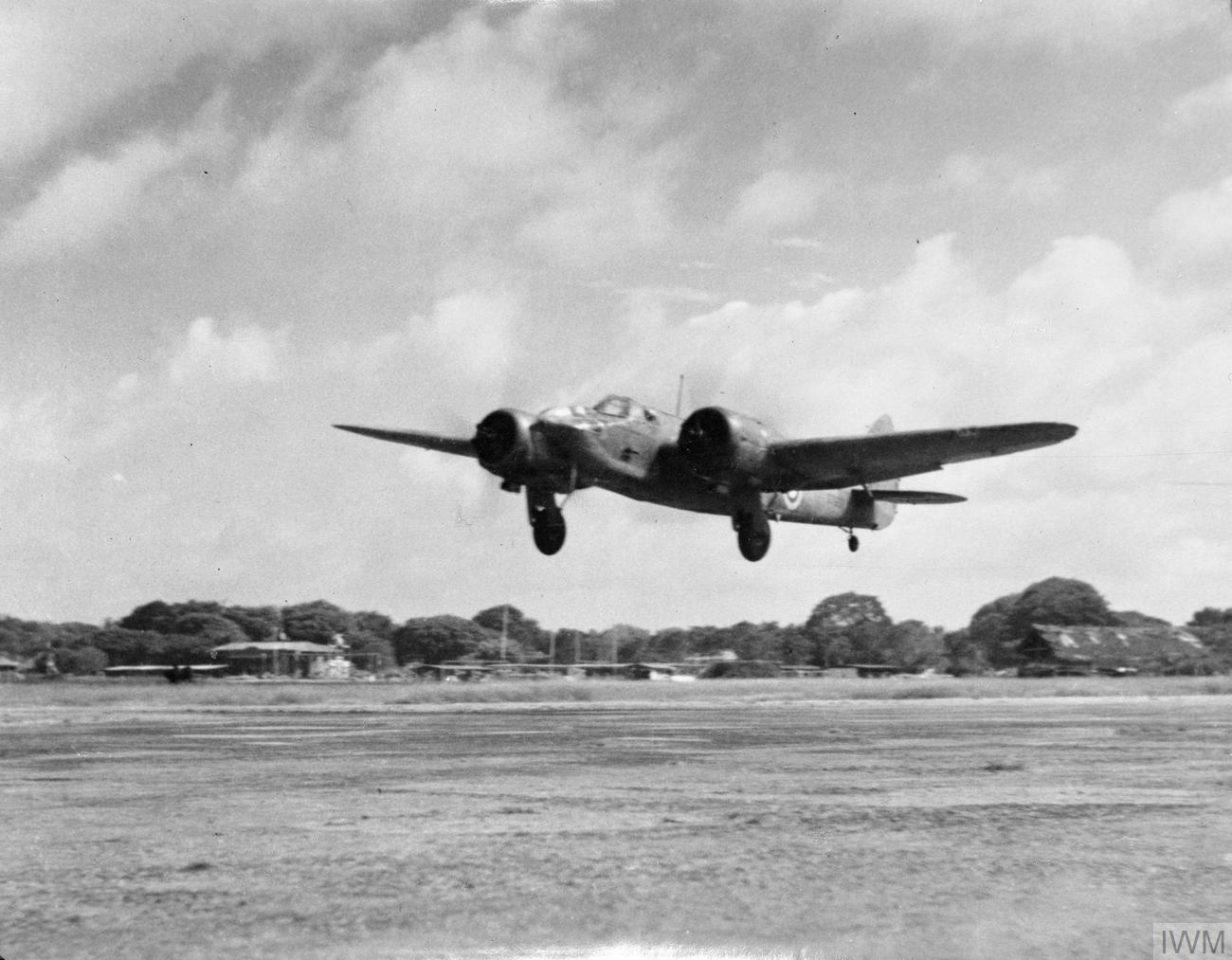
An 11 Squadron Blenheim Mk IV takes off from the Racecourse, Colombo

At 08:20, eleven Blenheims from 11 Squadron led by the CO, Squadron Leader Kenneth Ault set out from the Racecourse to attack the Japanese fleet but two Blenheims had to turn back with engine trouble. The Blenheims, flying at 11,000 ft (3,400 m) found the Japanese aircraft carriers after a search of thirty minutes at 10:48. Ault attacked Akagi, the largest of the aircraft carriers and the cruiser Tone and the Japanese, intent on rearming their aircraft failed to spot the Blenheims until 10:45–10:48. Anti-aircraft gun crews could not hit the Blenheims and six Zeros from Sōryū, eight from Hiryū and three each from Akagi and Zuikaku that were in the air and engaged the Blenheims as another twelve Zeros hurriedly took off. The Blenheims dropped 500 lb (227 kg) and 250 lb (110 kg) semi-armour-piercing bombs.

The three closest bombs near-missed Akagi to no effect, then the Blenheims formed a tight formation and turned for home, one Blenheim being shot down by Zeros, quickly followed by two more, a Zero was destroyed by a Blenheim gunner but his aircraft was also shot down. The Zeros stopped their attack to be ready for more waves of bombers and the five remaining Blenheims escaped. At 11:05 the Blenheims met the Vals from Shōkaku and Zeros from Hiryū returning from Hermes and the Zeros shot Ault's Blenheim down as gunners in the four remaining Blenheims claimed two Japanese aircraft shot down (one Zero was lost). When the Blenheims landed at the Racecourse, one crashed on landing, the crew surviving and two landed full of bullet holes, only two remaining operational.

==== Ships at sea ====
Efficiency of 9 April attacks on ships at sea
| Vals | Ship | Hits | Notes |
|---|---|---|---|
| 45 | HMS Hermes | 37 | 2 Vals: Akagi, 11: Hiryū, 14: Zuikaku, 18: Shōkaku |
| 16 | HMAS Vampire | 16 | 12 Vals: Akagi, 4: Hiryū |
| 6 | HMS Hollyhock | 1 | From Sōryū |
| 6 | SS British Sergeant | 6 | 3 Vals: Akagi, 3: Hiryū |
| 6 | RFA Athelstane | 5 | From Sōryū |
| 6 | SS Norviken | 5 | From Sōryū |
| 85 | | 70 | |

Japanese seaplanes had been sent to reconnoitre in case of an attack by the Eastern Fleet. On the discovery that the fleet was absent from Trincomalee harbour, the seaplanes searched for ships at sea. At 07:55 an aircraft from Haruna reported an aircraft carrier and three destroyers 155 nmi (287 km; 178 mi) from the Japanese fleet, bearing 250° south of Trincomalee and Nagumo gave orders for the Vals in reserve to attack.

At 08:25 a second signal was received from the seaplane calling the sighting a cruiser and two destroyers 155 nmi (287 km; 178 mi) distant on a bearing of 270° on a course of 180° at |12 kn (22 km/h; 14 mph) and Nagumo ordered the Vals to take off at once. At 08:43, 18 Vals each from Sōryū, Hiryū and Shōkaku, 17 from Akagi and 14 from Zuikaku, with nine Zero escorts, three each from Akagi, Sōryū and Hiryū took off, most carrying 550 lb (250 kg) bombs.

Six Fulmars of 273 Squadron scrambled from Kokkilai after a wounded Hurricane pilot landed, saying that the Japanese were coming. At 18,000 ft (5,500 m) the Fulmar pilots saw Hermes, surrounded by aircraft. The leader dived and fired on a Val that turned on its back. The Fulmar pilots claimed one Val shot down, one damaged, two probables and two damaged. The first Vals found Hermes and Vampire and 32 Vals bombed between 10:40 and 10:50. Hermes sank at 10:55 with the loss of 307 men. Vampire sank at 11:02, eight men being killed. Vals from Akagi and Hiryū searched further afield and sank the tanker RFA Athelstane (5,571 GRT) and its escort HMS Hollyhock, a Flower-class corvette, about 30 nmi (56 km; 35 mi) south of Batticaloa Light with the loss of 53 crew from Hollyhock, then set course for home. Hermes was sinking when Vals from Sōryū arrived and they searched to the north for more ships.

Eight Fulmars of 803 Squadron and 806 Squadron took off but Hermes had sunk by the time that they arrived. The Vals from Sōryū, having turned north, found several ships at 12:00 and attacked the tanker British Sergeant that foundered off Elephant Point, the crew surviving. The Norwegian Norviken (2,924 GRT) was bombed, broke in two and sank but the hospital ship Vita was left alone and rescued many of the survivors of Hermes. The attack ended at 12:15 and the Fulmars fought the dive-bombers in a melee lasting nearly half an hour. Two Fulmars were shot down and five Vals were claimed by 273, 803 and 806 squadrons, the real score being four. The remaining Fulmars landed at China Bay to refuel and re-arm but they were ordered to defend the airfield instead.

Fighters were ordered to Hermes from China Bay and Ratmalana but China Bay had been bombed; 261 Squadron had been reduced to two aircraft and two pilots, one wounded and the other having already been shot down. The signal reached Ratmalana too late, because the telephone system had been damaged on the 5 April raid.

== Aftermath ==
=== Analysis ===
In 2022, Charles Stephenson wrote that the sinking of the ships caught at sea after the bombing of Trincomalee Harbour had achieved little, redeemed the raid to an extent. For nine men killed, five aircraft shot down, one written-off and five more damaged the Japanese Navy sank an aircraft carrier, a destroyer, a corvette, two tankers and a merchant ship. Michal Piegzik, also in 2022, wrote that the attack was conducted with great accuracy, like the earlier raid on Colombo and that the Zero escorts had exploited their manoeuvrability and numbers to keep the Hurricanes off the bombers. Anti-aircraft fire was mitigated by the later waves opening their formations, against 764 rounds from the QF 3.7-inch AA guns and 953 from the local 40 mm Bofors guns. The gunners lacked training and were taken by surprise but increased in effectiveness once they got going, the heavy AA claiming four aircraft and the light AA claiming six.

=== Casualties ===
Aircraft losses, 9 April 1942
| Aircraft | No. | Notes |
British
| Albacore | 5 | 3 Deck cargo, Sabaing, 2 at China Bay |
| Blenheim | 5 | Shot down |
| Catalina | 1 | Shot down |
| Fulmar | 5 | 1 shot down, 4 at China Bay |
| Hurricane | 9 | Shot down |
| Swordfish | 7 | At China Bay |
| Walrus | 1 | Deck cargo, Sabaing |
Japanese
| Zero | 3 | Trincomalee |
| Kate | 6 | 2 at Trincomalee, 4 off coast |

Of the 16 Hurricanes that had engaged, eight were shot down or force-landed at China Bay and three more were damaged. On the ground, seven Swordfish, four Fulmars, two Albacores, an unserviceable Hurricane and the Orderly Room were destroyed; a petrol bowser with 700 imp gal (3,200 L; 840 US gal) of fuel was set on fire. Two men were killed and Flight Lieutenant Eric Edsall, running to get the bowser out of the way, was strafed by a Zero and mortally wounded. A Japanese aircraft crashed on an anti-aircraft gun emplacement, the crew being killed along with the gunners.

Duriing the attacks on ships at sea, nine Japanese aviators were killed, five aircraft shot down, one was written-off and five damaged. The Japanese aircrew sank one aircraft carrier, a destroyer, one corvette, two tankers and a merchant ship with 374 men killed and 164 wounded. The hospital ship Vita, heading for Colombo, rescued 595 survivors from Hermes and Vampire between 13:00 and 19:00, undisturbed by the Japanese. Some survivors were rescued by local vessels or managed to swim ashore. Six Blenheim aircrew were killed attacking the Japanese fleet and in defending British ships, three Vals were shot down, along with two Fulmars.

== Japanese order of battle ==
For supporting ships see Indian Ocean raid

1st Carrier Fleet (Southern Force) or Kidō Butai (Mobile Force)
| Ship | (English) | Flag | Class | Notes |
Vice-Admiral Chūichi Nagumo, C-in-C 1st Air Fleet
1st Carrier Squadron
| Akagi | Red Castle | Imperial Japanese Navy | Amagi-class aircraft carrier | |
2nd Carrier Squadron
| Sōryū | Blue [or Green] Dragon | Imperial Japanese Navy | aircraft carrier | |
| Hiryū | Flying Dragon | Imperial Japanese Navy | aircraft carrier | |
5th Carrier Squadron
| Shōkaku | Soaring Crane | Imperial Japanese Navy | Shōkaku-class aircraft carrier | |
| Zuikaku | Auspicious Crane | Imperial Japanese Navy | Shōkaku-class aircraft carrier | |

=== Japanese plan ===
Commander Fuchida Mitsuo (Akagi)
| Unit | Aircraft | Carrier | Target | Notes |
|---|---|---|---|---|
| 1st Attack Unit | 18 Nakajima B5N (Kate) | Akagi | Navy arsenal and buildings | Vals in reserve |
| 3rd Attack Unit | 18 Nakajima B5N (Kate) | Sōryū | Navy arsenal and buildings | Vals in reserve |
| 4th Attack Unit | 18 Nakajima B5N (Kate) | Hiryū | HQ Ceylon commander, barracks, AA positions | Vals in reserve |
| 5th Attack Unit | 19 Aichi D3A (Val) | Shōkaku | China Bay airfield, seaplane base | Vals in reserve |
| 6th Attack Unit | 18 Nakajima B5N (Kate) | Zuikaku | Naval commander, governor and barracks | Vals in reserve |
| 1st Air Control Unit | 6 Mitsubishi A6M Zero | Akagi | Escort and ground strafing | |
| 3rd Air Control Unit | 6 Mitsubishi A6M Zero | Sōryū | Escort and strafing of seaplane base | |
| 4th Air Control Unit | 6 Mitsubishi A6M Zero | Hiryū | Escort and strafing of seaplane base | |
| 5th Air Control Unit | 10 Mitsubishi A6M Zero | Shōkaku | Escort and strafing of China Bay | |
| 6th Air Control Unit | 10 Mitsubishi A6M Zero | Zuikaku | Escort and strafing of China Bay | |

== British order of battle ==
=== Army ===
Ceylon garrison, March 1942
| Unit | Flag | Type | Notes |
Ceylon Defence Force
| Ceylon Light Infantry | British Army | Infantry | |
| Ceylon Planters Rifle Corps | British Army | Infantry | |
| Colombo Town Guard | British Army | Infantry | |
| Ceylon Garrison Artillery | British Army | Artillery | 6-inch naval, 9.2-inch naval |
| 65th Heavy AA Regt | British Army | Anti-Aircraft | 40 × 3.7-inch AA,, 4 × 3-inch 20 cwt AA |
| 43rd Light AA Regt | British Army | Anti-Aircraft | 69 × Bofors 40 mm AA from March 1942 |
Indian Army
| 34th Indian Division | British Indian Army | Infantry | |
| 21st (East Africa) Infantry Brigade | British Army | Infantry | Attached to 34th Indian Division |
Australian Army
6th Australian Division
| 16th Australian Brigade | Australian Army | Infantry | |
| 17th Australian Brigade | Australian Army | Infantry | |

=== Royal Air Force–Fleet Air Arm ===
222 Group RAF
| | Flag | Type | Base | Notes |
RAF
Colombo
| 11 Squadron | Royal Air Force | Bomber | Racecourse | 14 Blenheim Mk IV |
| 258 Squadron | Royal Air Force | Fighter | Racecourse | 9 Hurricane Mk IIb, 5 Mk Ib, 8 lost 5 April |
| 30 Squadron | Royal Air Force | Fighter | RAF Ratmalana | 22 Hurricane Mk IIb, 8 lost 5 April |
Galle
| 202 Squadron | Royal Air Force | Flying boat | RAF Koggala | 1 Catalina |
| 205 Squadron | Royal Air Force | Flying boat | RAF Koggala | Catalina FV-R |
| 413 Squadron | Royal Canadian Air Force | Flying boat | RAF Koggala | 3 Catalina |
Netherlands Naval Aviation Service
| Groep Vliegtuig-2 | Marineluchtvaartdienst | Flying boat | RAF Koggala | (Aircraft Group-2 [GVT-2]) Catalina Y-64 |
| Groep Vliegtuig-16 | Marineluchtvaartdienst | Flying boat | RAF Koggala | (GVT-16) Catalinas Y-55, Y-56 and Y-57 |
Trincomalee
| 261 Squadron | Royal Air Force | Fighter | RAF China Bay | 1 Hurricane Mk I, 17 Mk IIb |
| 273 Squadron | Royal Air Force | Fighter | RAF China Bay | 16 Fulmar Mk I/Mk II |
| 788 Naval Air Squadron | Fleet Air Arm | Torpedo-bomber | RAF China Bay | 6 Swordfish, Albacore, 6 Swordfish shot down |
| 803 Naval Air Squadron | Fleet Air Arm | Carrier fighter | RAF China Bay | 12 Fulmar Mk II |
| 806 Naval Air Squadron | Fleet Air Arm | Carrier fighter | RAF China Bay | 12 Fulmar Mk II |
| 814 Naval Air Squadron | Fleet Air Arm | Torpedo-bomber | RAF China Bay | 10 Swordfish, ashore from HMS Hermes |
| HMS Indomitable | Fleet Air Arm | Fighter | RAF China Bay | 2 Martlet, ashore from Indomitable |

=== Warships in Trincomalee Harbour ===
Allied warships 9 April 1942
| Ship | Flag | Class | Notes |
Trincomalee Harbour
| HMS Balta | Royal Navy | Isles-class trawler | Minesweeper 545 GRT, no damage |
| HMS Barbour | Royal Navy | Bar-class boom defence vessel | 533 GRT, no damage |
| HMS Erebus | Royal Navy | Monitor | Near-missed, 5† 20 wounded |
| HNLMS Sumatra | Royal Netherlands Navy | Java-class cruiser | Damaged by dud |

=== Warships dispersed from Trincomalee ===
Warships dispersed (8–9 April 1942)
| Ship | Flag | Class | Notes |
|---|---|---|---|
| HMS Hermes | Royal Navy | Aircraft carrier | Sunk, 7°35′28.39″N, 82°5′55.09″E 307† |
| HMS Hollyhock | Royal Navy | Flower-class corvette | Sunk, 07°30′N, 81°57′E, 53† |
| HMS Teviot Bank | Royal Navy | 5,087 GRT | Auxiliary minelayer, not attacked |
| HMAS Vampire | Royal Navy | V-class destroyer | Sunk, 8† |
| HMHS Vita | Royal Navy | Hospital ship | Rescued 595 survivors, Hermes and Vampire, 13:00–19:00, not attacked |

=== Merchant ships dispersed from Trincomalee ===
Merchant ships scattered (8–9 April 1942)
| Ship | Year | Flag | GRT | Notes |
At sea
| RFA Athelstane | 1918 | Merchant Navy | 5,571 | Z-class tanker, bombed, sunk, 07°30′N, 81°56′E, 0† |
| SS British Sergeant | 1922 | Merchant Navy | 5,868 | Tanker, sunk, 08°01′N, 81°38′E, 0† 59 surv |
| MV Bamora | 1914 | Royal Fleet Auxiliary | 3,291 | Armament Stores Issuing Ship, not attacked |
| MV Norviken | 1925 | Norway | 2,924 | Bombed, ship abandoned, 4† 42 surv |
| RFA Pearleaf | 1917 | Royal Fleet Auxiliary | 5,911 | Leaf-class tanker |
| MV Heron | 1937 | Royal Fleet Auxiliary | 2,375 | Armament Stores Issuing Ship, not attacked |
| SS Prome | 1937 | Royal Fleet Auxiliary | 7,043 | Armament Stores Issuing Ship, not attacked |
| SS Ting Sang | 1922 | Royal Fleet Auxiliary | 2,256 | Armament Stores Issuing Ship, not attacked |

=== Trincomalee and Ceylonese waters ===
Merchant ships at Trincomalee (9 April 1942)
| Ship | Year | Flag | GRT | Notes |
|---|---|---|---|---|
| SS Bendoran | 1910 | Merchant Navy | 5,567 | No damage |
| SS City of Agra | 1936 | Merchant Navy | 6,361 | No Damage |
| SS Clan MacInnes | 1920 | Merchant Navy | 4,672 | No damage |
| SS Empire Moonrise | 1941 | Merchant Navy | 6,854 | Sunk near Colombo in transit past Ceylon |
| SS Garoet | 1917 | Netherlands | 7,118 | No damage |
| SS Hong Siang | 1912 | Merchant Navy | 3,703 | no damage |
| SS Marionga D. Thermiotis | 1904 | Greece | 4,784 | Strafed off Trincomalee, damaged |
| SS Salando | 1920 | Netherlands | 5,272 | No damage |
| SS Sembilan | 1922 | Netherlands | 6,556 | No damage |
| SS Warina | 1918 | Merchant Navy | 3,120 | No damage |

=== Ships at Trincomalee ===
Ships in harbour (9 April 1942)
| Ship | Year | Flag | GRT | Notes |
|---|---|---|---|---|
| HMS C.405 | — | British Ceylon | — | CRNVR, mine sweeping tug, no damage |
| HMS Hoxa | 1941 | Royal Navy | 545 | Minesweeping trawler, no damage |
| HMS Majestic | — | British Ceylon | — | CRNVR, boom defence tender, no damage |
| HMS Samson | 1903 | British Ceylon | 310 | CRNVR, minesweeping tug, damaged |
| HMS Sandgate | 1917 | Royal Navy | 270 | Barrage/gate vessel, no damage |
| HMS Southgate | 1917 | Royal Navy | 270 | Barrage/gate vessel, no damage |

== See also ==
- Indian Ocean raid
- Ceylon in World War II

== Bibliography ==
- Anten, J.; Klom, H. (2001). Hr. Ms. kruisers 'Java' en 'Sumatra' (in Dutch). Zierikzee, NL: Asia Maior. ISBN 978-9-07-486118-2.
- Behrens, C. B. A. (1955). Hancock, K. (ed.). Merchant Shipping and the Demands of War. History of the Second World War United Kingdom Civil Series. London: HMSO. OCLC 498039 – via Archive Foundation.
- Boyd, Andrew (2017). The Royal Navy in Eastern Waters. Barnsley: Seaforth Publishing (Pen & Sword). ISBN 978-1-4738-9248-4.
- British Vessels lost at Sea 1939–45 (2nd facs. repr. Patrick Stephens, Cambridge ed.). London: HMSO. 1976 [1947]. ISBN 978-0-85-059267-2. original titles, Ships of the Royal Navy: Statement of Losses during the Second World War and British Merchant Vessels lost of Damaged by enemy Action during Second World War
- Brown, David (1995) [1990]. Warship Losses of World War Two (2nd rev. ed.). London: Arms and Armour Press. ISBN 1-85409-278-2.
- Buxton, Ian (2008) [1978]. Big Gun Monitors: Design, Construction and Operations 1914–1945. Barnsley: Seaforth Publishing (Pen & Sword Books). ISBN 978-1-84415-719-8.
- Defensive Phase. Ministry of Defence (Navy) War with Japan. Vol. II. London: HMSO. 1995. ISBN 978-0-11-772818-9.
- Greenhous, B.; et al. (1994). The Official History of the Royal Canadian Air Force: The Crucible of War, 1939–1945. Vol. III. Toronto: University of Toronto Press and Department of National Defence. ISBN 978-0-8020-0574-8. D2-63/3-1994E.
- Hurstfield, Joel (1953). Hancock, W. K. (ed.). The Control of Raw Materials. History of the Second World War, United Kingdom Civil Series (War Production Series, Director: M. M. Postan). London: HMSO and Longman, Green and Co. OCLC 698112.
- Jackson, Ashley (2006). "Ch 11: The Islands of the Indian Ocean". The British Empire and the Second World War. London and New York: Hambledon Continuum. pp. 307−349. ISBN 1-85285-417-0.
- Jordan, Roger W. (2006) [1999]. The World's Merchant Fleets 1939: The Particulars and Wartime Fates of 6,000 Ships (2nd ed.). London: Chatham/Lionel Leventhal. ISBN 978-1-86176-293-1.
- Joslen, Hubert Frank (1960). Orders of Battle: United Kingdom and Colonial Formations and Units in the Second World War 1939–1945 Based on Official Documents. History of the Second World War. Vol. II. London: HMSO. OCLC 1110934538.
- Kindell, Don (15 July 2011). "Admiralty War Diaries of World War 2: Eastern Fleet, April to June 1942". naval. history. net.
- Kindell, Don (8 April 2012). "Royal Navy Ships, January 1942 (Part 4 of 4)". naval. history. net.
- Naval Operations off Ceylon 29th March to 10th April, 1942. Battle summary, No. 15 C.B. 3081 (9). London: Great Britain Admiralty Historical Section Training and Staff Duties Division. 1943. OCLC 221790218.
- "Naval Events, April–December 1942". naval-history.net. 8 April 2012.
- Piegzik, Mikhal A. (2022). The Darkest Hour: The Japanese Naval Offensive in the Indian Ocean 1942 – The Attack against Ceylon and the Eastern Fleet. Asia@War No. 33. Vol. II. Warwick: Helion. ISBN 978-1-804510-23-0.
- Richards, Denis; Saunders, Hilary St. George (1975) [1954]. The Fight Avails. Official History of the Royal Air Force 1935–1945. Vol. II. London: HMSO. ISBN 0-11-771593-X – via Archive Foundation.
- Rohwer, Jürgen; Hümmelchen, Gerhard (2005) [1972]. Chronology of the War at Sea, 1939–1945: The Naval History of World War Two (3rd rev. ed.). London: Chatham. ISBN 1-86176-257-7.
- Roskill, Stephen (1956). War at Sea 1939–1945: The Period of Balance. United Kingdom Military Series. Vol. II. London: HMSO. OCLC 59620954 – via Archive Foundation.
- Shores, Christopher; Cull, Brian; Izawa, Yasuho (2014) [1993]. Bloody Shambles: The Defence of Sumatra to the Fall of Burma. Vol. II. London: Grub Street. ISBN 978-0-94-881767-0.
- Stephenson, Charles (2022). The Eastern Fleet and the Indian Ocean 1942–1944: The Fleet that had to Hide. Barnsley and New York: Pen & Sword Books. ISBN 978-1-52679-776-6.
- Stille, Mark (2023). Japan's Indian Ocean Raid 1942: The Allies' Lowest Ebb. Campaign No. 396. Oxford: Osprey. ISBN 978-1-47-285418-6.
- Stuart, Robert (2014). "Air Raid Colombo, 5 April 1942: The Fully Expected Surprise Attack". Royal Canadian Air Force Journal. 3 (4). Department of National Defence of Canada. ISSN 1927-761X.
- Woodburn Kirby, Stanley; Addis, C. T.; Meiklejohn, J. F.; Roberts, M. R.; Wards, G. T.; Desoer, N. L. (2004) [1958]. The War against Japan: India's Most Dangerous Hour. History of the Second World War, united Kingdom Military Series (facs. pbk. Naval & Military Press, Uckfield ed.). London: HMSO. ISBN 978-1-84-574061-0.
- Wragg, David (2001) [2019]. The Fleet Air Arm Handbook 1939–1945. Stroud: Sutton. ISBN 978-0-75-092596-9.
