= Ceylon in World War II =

After the outbreak of the Second World War, in the British Crown Colony of Ceylon (modern-day Sri Lanka), the government of Sir Don Baron Jayatilaka assured the British King and his government of its continued support.

== Preparations for war ==
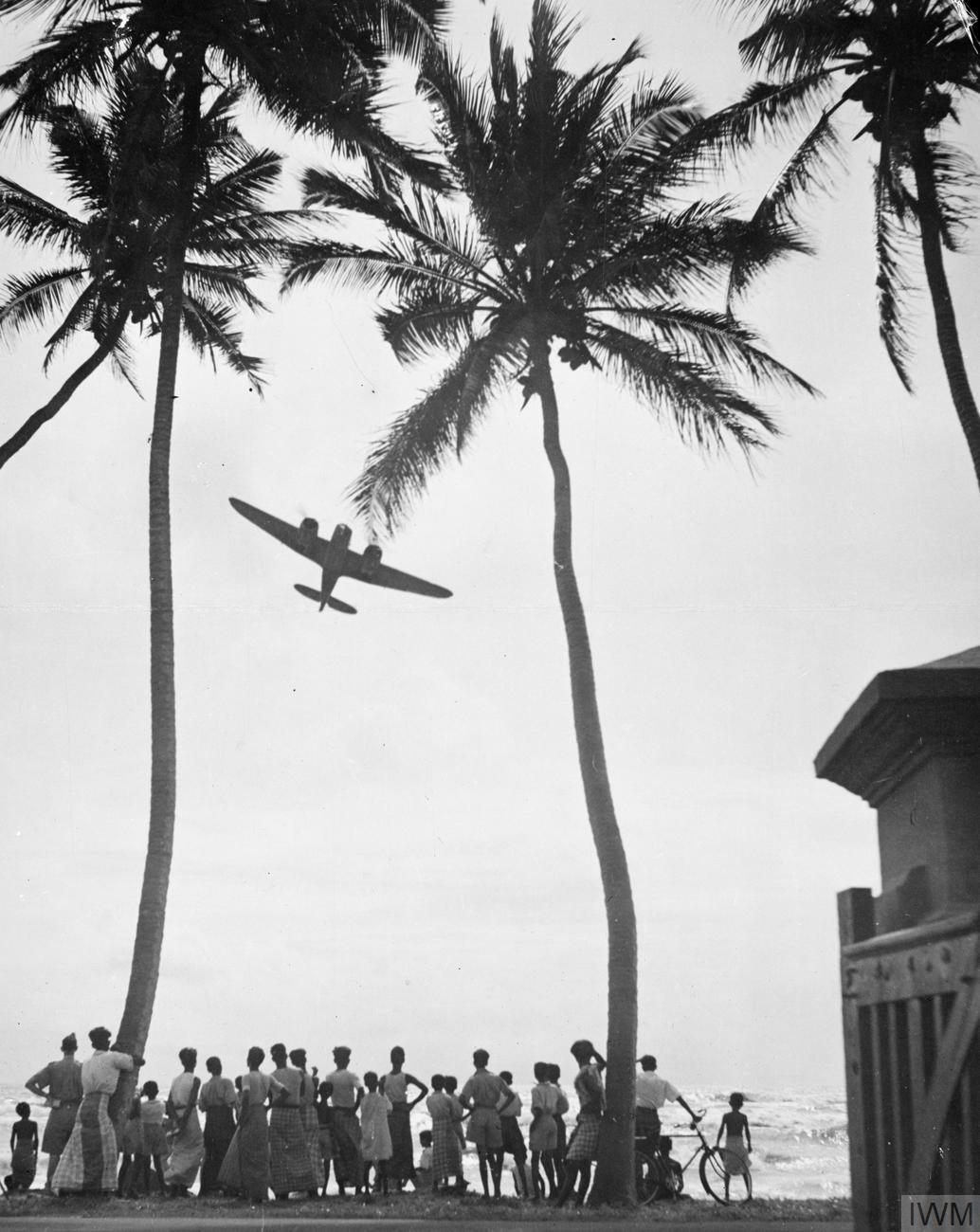
An RAF Bristol Blenheim bombers patrol over Ceylon.

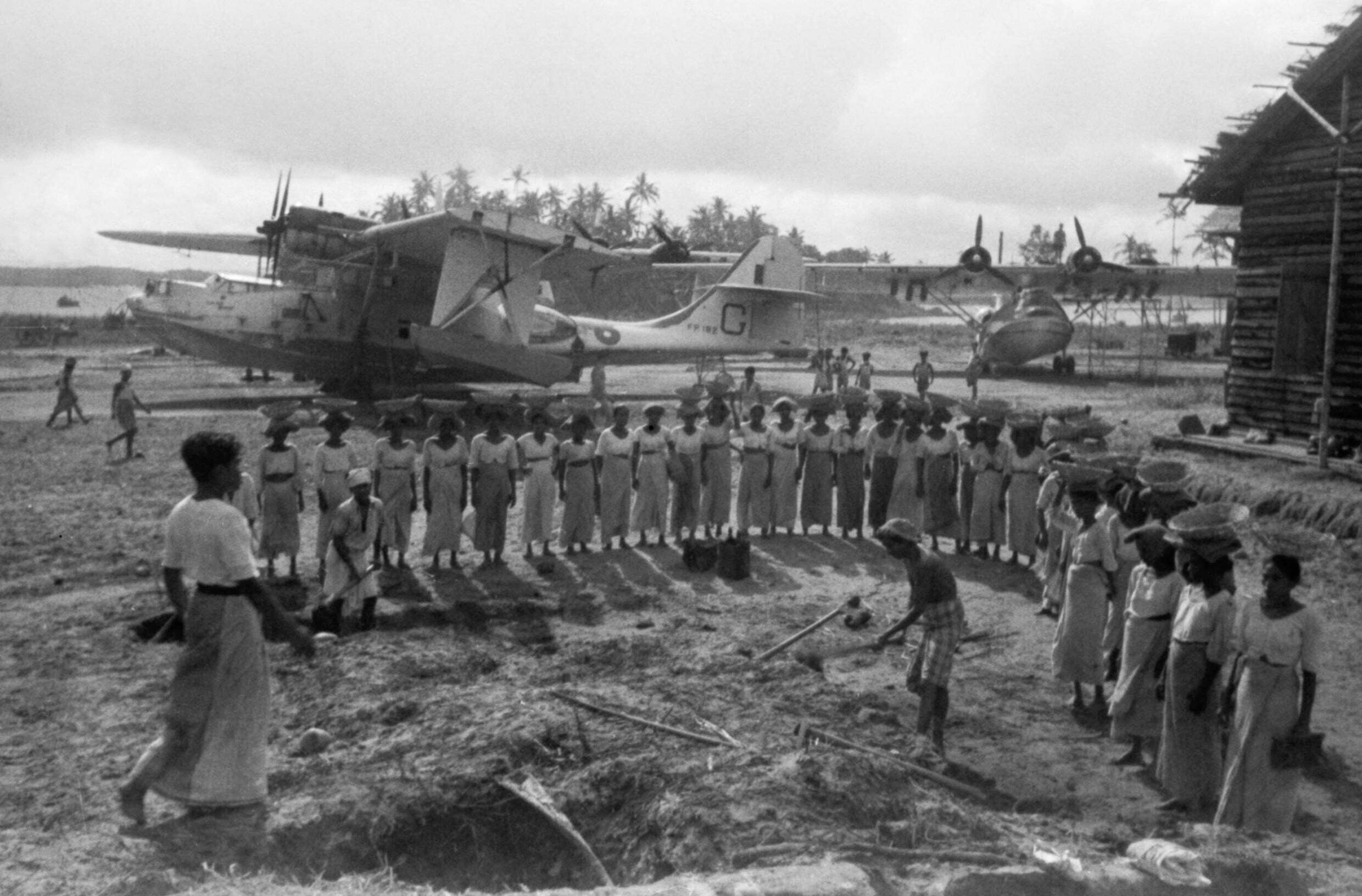
Sri Lankan Indian Tamil women labourers RAF flying boat station at Red Hills Lake, Ceylon.

The British had occupied the coastal areas of the island since 1796, but after 1917 the colony had no regular garrison of British troops. The Ceylon Defence Force and Ceylon Navy Volunteer Reserve were mobilised and expanded. The Royal Navy maintained naval installations in Trincomalee and the Royal Air Force (RAF) had established an aerodrome in China Bay, Trincomalee long before the war.

After the fall of Singapore the Royal Navy's East Indies Station was moved to Colombo and then to Trincomalee. Admiral Sir Geoffrey Layton was appointed Commander-in-Chief, Ceylon with Air Vice Marshal John D'Albiac Air Officer Commanding and Admiral Sir James Somerville appointed commander of the British Eastern Fleet.

The army headquarters were established at the Colombo Museum building, while the Fighter Operations Room was set up at Bishop's College, Colombo. Naval headquarters was moved to HMS Lanka and its operations room took form in an underground center and Admiral Layton established his headquarters at the Secretariat. Admiral Somerville took over the house of the King's Harbour Master adjoining the Victoria Arcade Navy officer's mess.

The fixed land defences consisted of four coastal batteries at Colombo and five at Trincomalee; these were established prior to the war. Air defences were expanded starting in 1941 with the RAF occupying the civil airfield at Ratmalana near Colombo with its station headquarters set up at Kandawala. Another airfield was rapidly built at Koggala near Galle and several temporary airstrips were built across the country, with the largest at Colombo Racecourse Airstrip. Several RAF Squadrons were sent to Ceylon. Several Commonwealth units were also stationed in Ceylon for the duration of the war.

== Ceylon volunteers ==
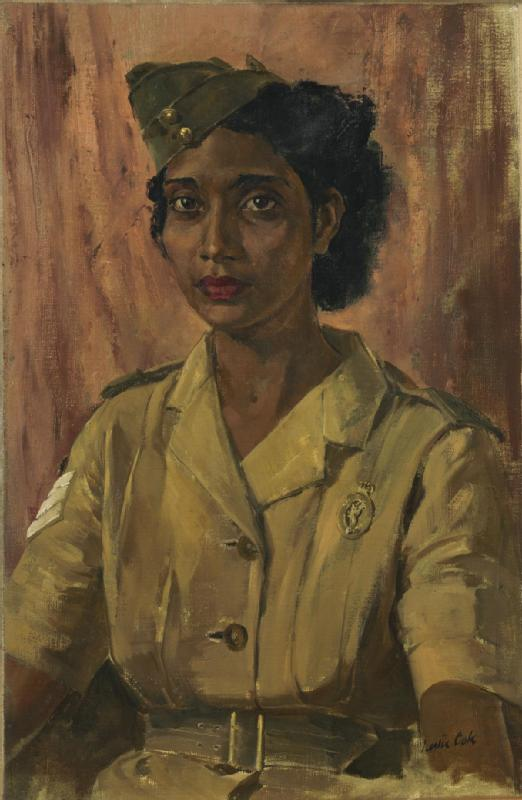
Sergeant Van Omoheusen of the Auxiliary Territorial Service, Sri Lanka.

As with other British Colonies, conscription was not implemented in Ceylon. However, Ceylonese were encouraged to volunteer for service. Many volunteered throughout the war, most joining the Ceylon Defence Force, which was expanded from a reserve unit to a mobilised force of 10 infantry battalions, 3 artillery regiments and support units. For the first time, Ceylonese units were deployed outside Ceylon in formation until the Cocos Islands Mutiny after which deployment overseas of Ceylonese units was stopped with a few exceptions.

Ceylonese continued to volunteer and joined the British Army, RAF and the Royal Navy. They were supplemented by personnel of the Ceylon Defence Force who requested transfer to front line units of the British Army. They served in the Burma and later in Malaya. Ceylonese served in the Royal Engineers in Italy and with the Royal Army Service Corps in the Middle East and North Africa. The 1st battalion, the Ceylon Corps of Military Police, served in Malaya till 1949.

Several of those who served with Commonwealth Forces during the war went on to serve in the Sri Lankan Armed Forces after Ceylon gained independence in 1948; these include General D. S. Attygalle, Major General Anton Muttukumaru, Major General Bertram Heyn, Major General Richard Udugama, Major General H.W.G. Wijeyekoon and Air Vice Marshal Edward Amerasakera.

== Ceylon Navy Volunteer Reserve ==
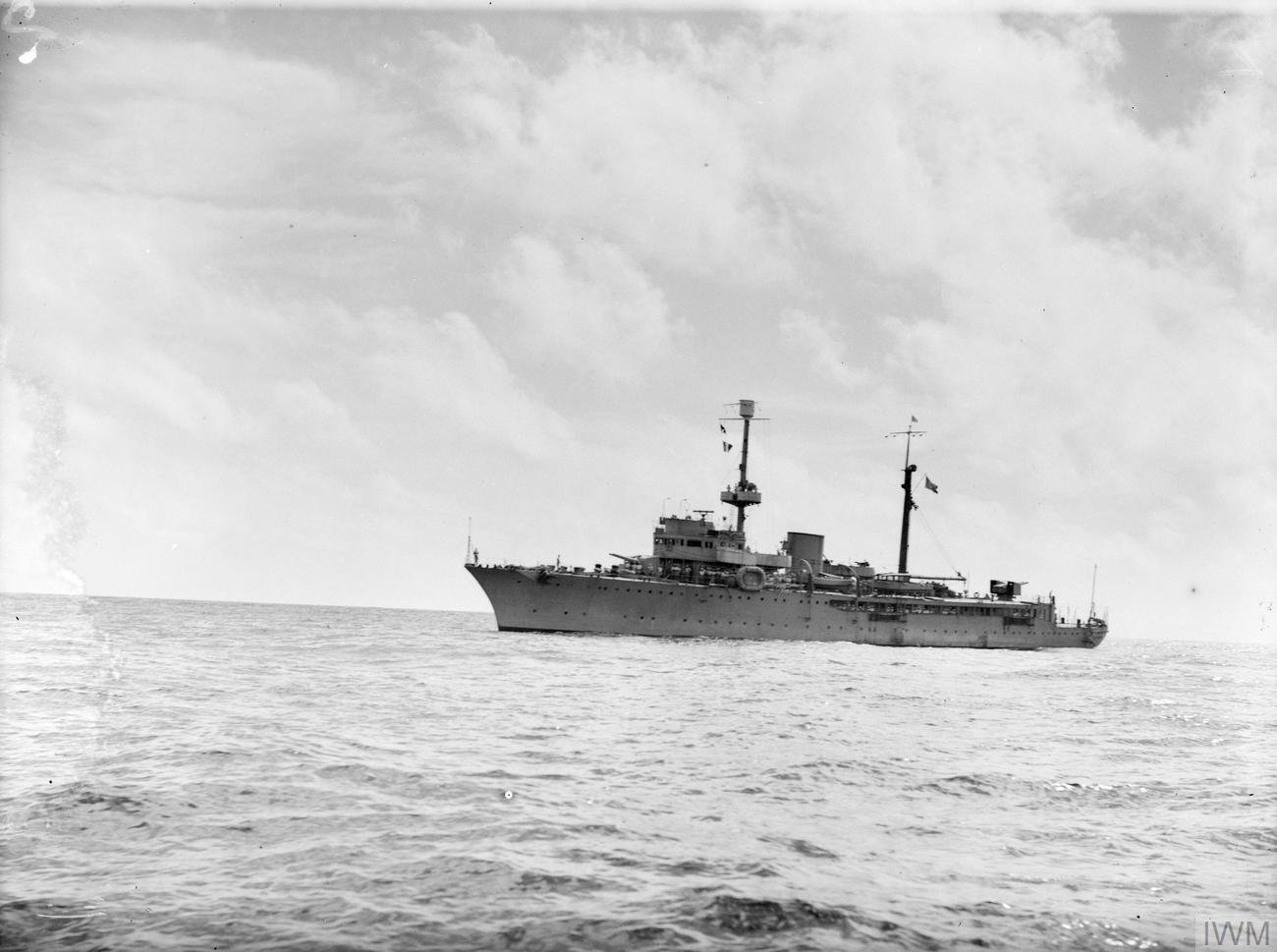
Eritrea, 14 September 1943 entering Port of Colombo to surrender following interception by HMS Overdale Wyke of the Ceylon Naval Volunteer Force.

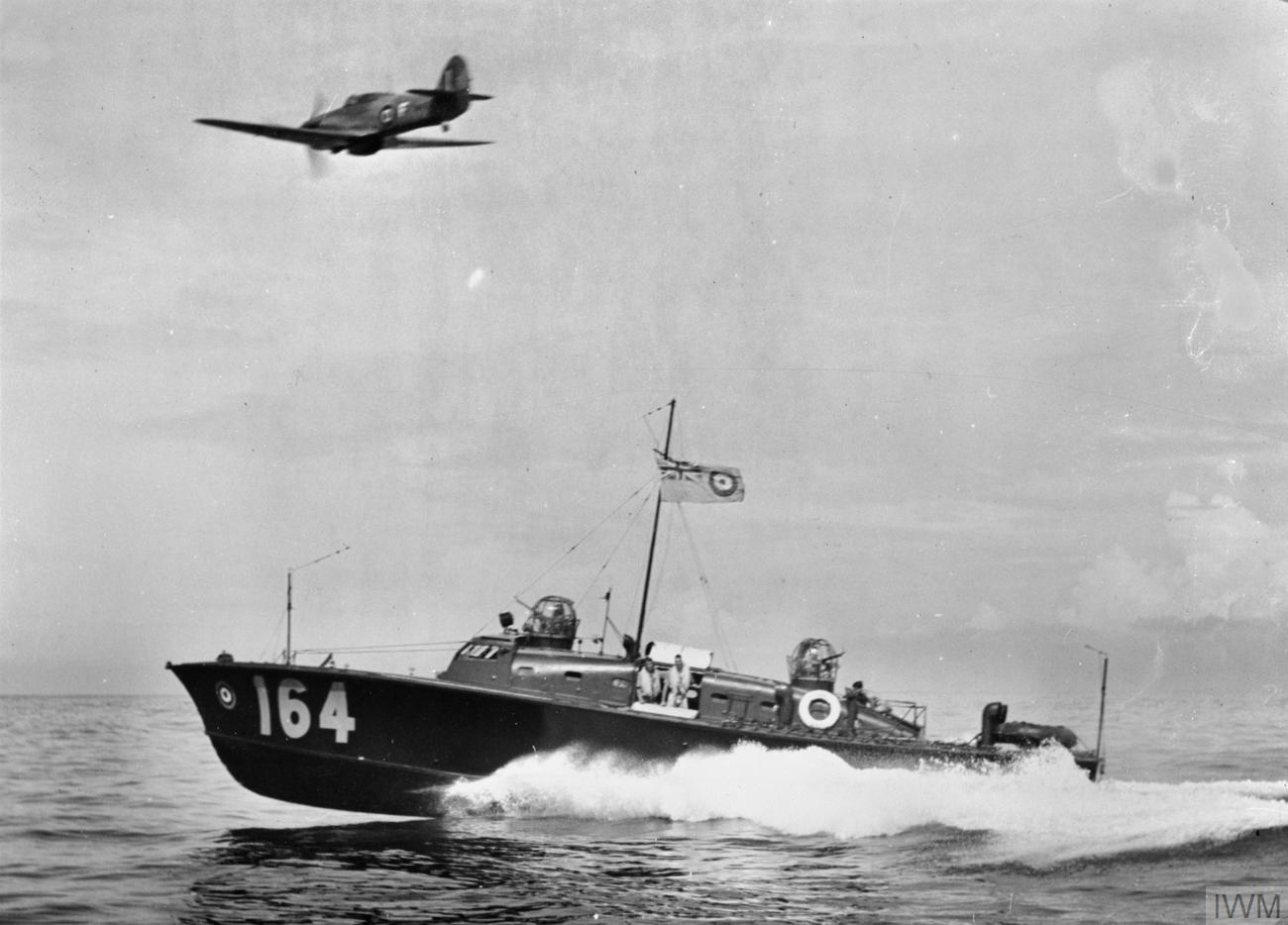
Whaleback HSL 164, a Type Two 63 ft HSL, off Colombo with a Hawker Hurricane overhead.

The Ceylon Navy Volunteer Reserve was taken over by the Royal Navy. Cutting its teeth on the Port Commission Tugs Samson and Goliath, it later manned and operated trawlers and Antarctic whalers converted as Minesweepers and fitted out with guns, submarine detection equipment and anti-submarine weaponry. They were H.M. Ships Overdala Wyike (the first ship to be purchased by the Government of Ceylon), Okapi, Semla, Sambhur, Hoxa, Balta and H.M Tugs Barnet and C405. In addition it manned several Motor Fishing Vessels (MFV) and miscellaneous auxiliary vessels. All were manned exclusively by CRNVR personnel. These ships were meant to sweep and guard the approaches the harbours but were also often used on extended missions outside Ceylon waters. In the course of these operations, the ships came under enemy fire, recovered essential information from Japanese aircraft shot down, sailed to Akyab after the Burma front was opened in two FMVs for harbour duties, and was called upon to accept the surrender of the Italian colonial ship Eritrea and escort her to port with a prize crew on board.

== Cocos Islands Mutiny ==
The sinking of the battleship HMS Prince of Wales and the battlecruiser HMS Repulse, and the subsequent fall of Singapore, punctured forever the myth of British invincibility. Against this backdrop, and on the agitation of the Trotskyist-inspired Lanka Sama Samaja Party, soldiers of the garrison on Horsburgh Island in the Cocos Islands mutinied on the night, intending to hand the islands over to the Japanese. The mutiny was suppressed within an hour, however, and three of the mutineers were later executed — the only British Commonwealth soldiers to be executed for mutiny during the Second World War.

Following the mutiny the use of Ceylonese combat troops was discontinued by the British, although a number of supply and transport units were used in the rear areas in the Middle East. The defences of Ceylon were reinforced by the 7th Australian Division and elements of the 1st (African) Division because of the island's strategic importance, holding almost all the British Empire's resources of rubber.

== Japanese attack on Ceylon ==
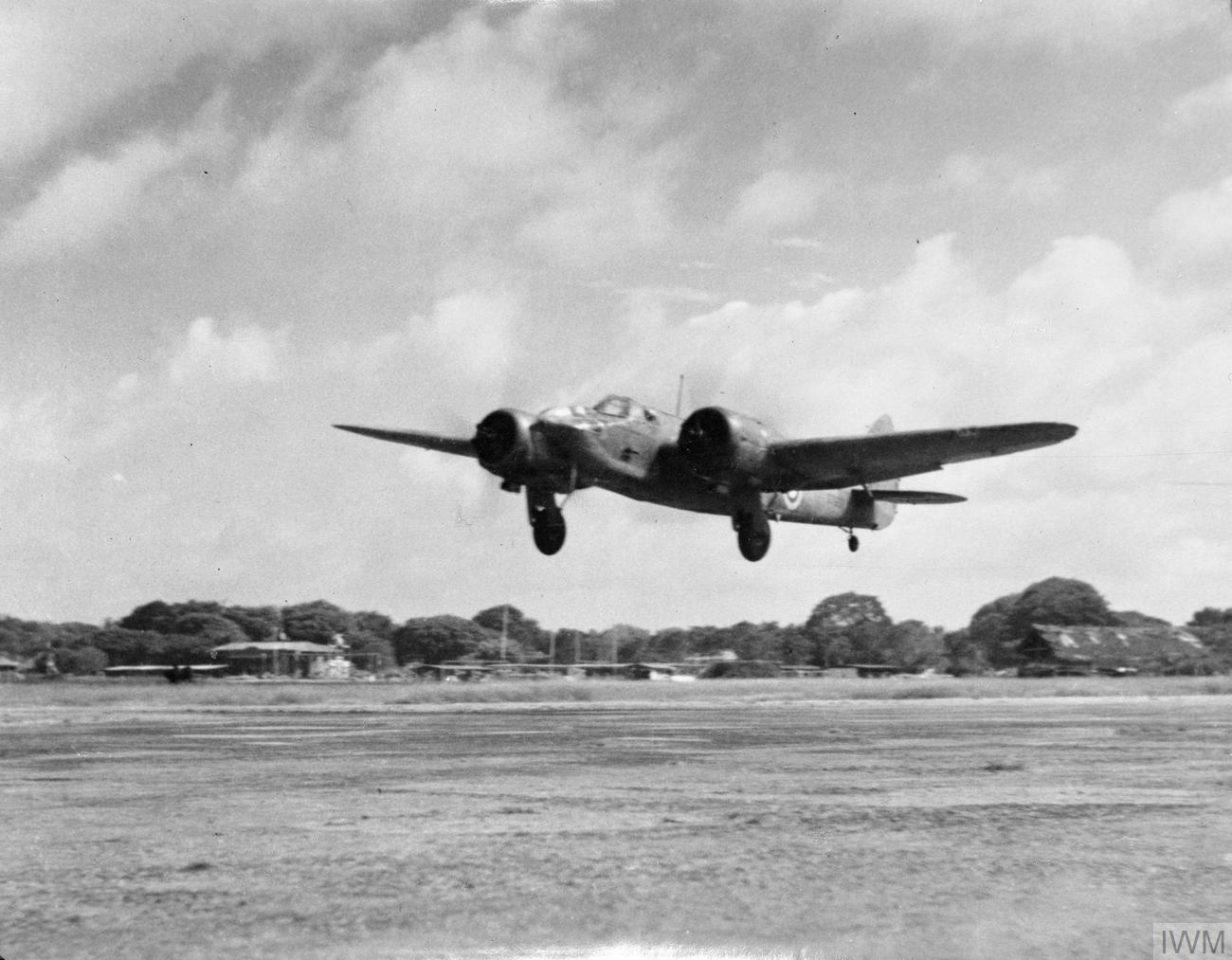
An RAF Bristol Blenheim bomber takes off from Colombo Racecourse in Ceylon during the Second World War.

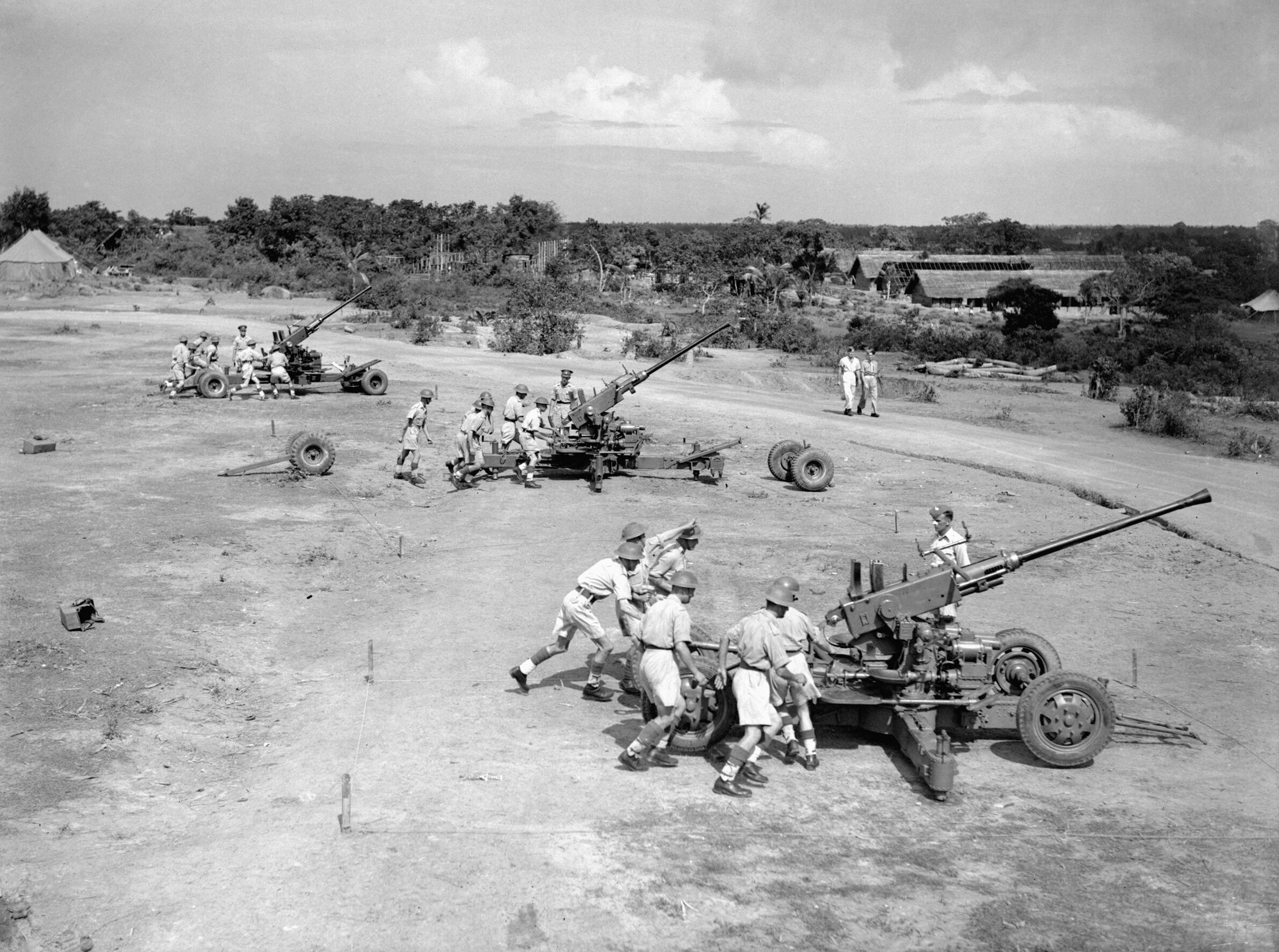
British anti-aircraft defences in Ceylon, 1943

The Easter Sunday Raid was the air raid carried out by Japan on Easter Sunday (5 April) 1942 on Colombo; a few days later Trincomalee was also attacked.

Although the military effect of the raids was substantial - it resulted in the sinking of several ships including two cruisers and an aircraft carrier, the effect on the Ceylonese population was far greater as it had heard of the Nanjing Massacres and of the act of brutality of the Japanese in occupied countries. The civilian population began a panicked fleeing of Colombo and of Ceylon by boat to India following the raid.

== Opposition and anticolonial nationalism ==
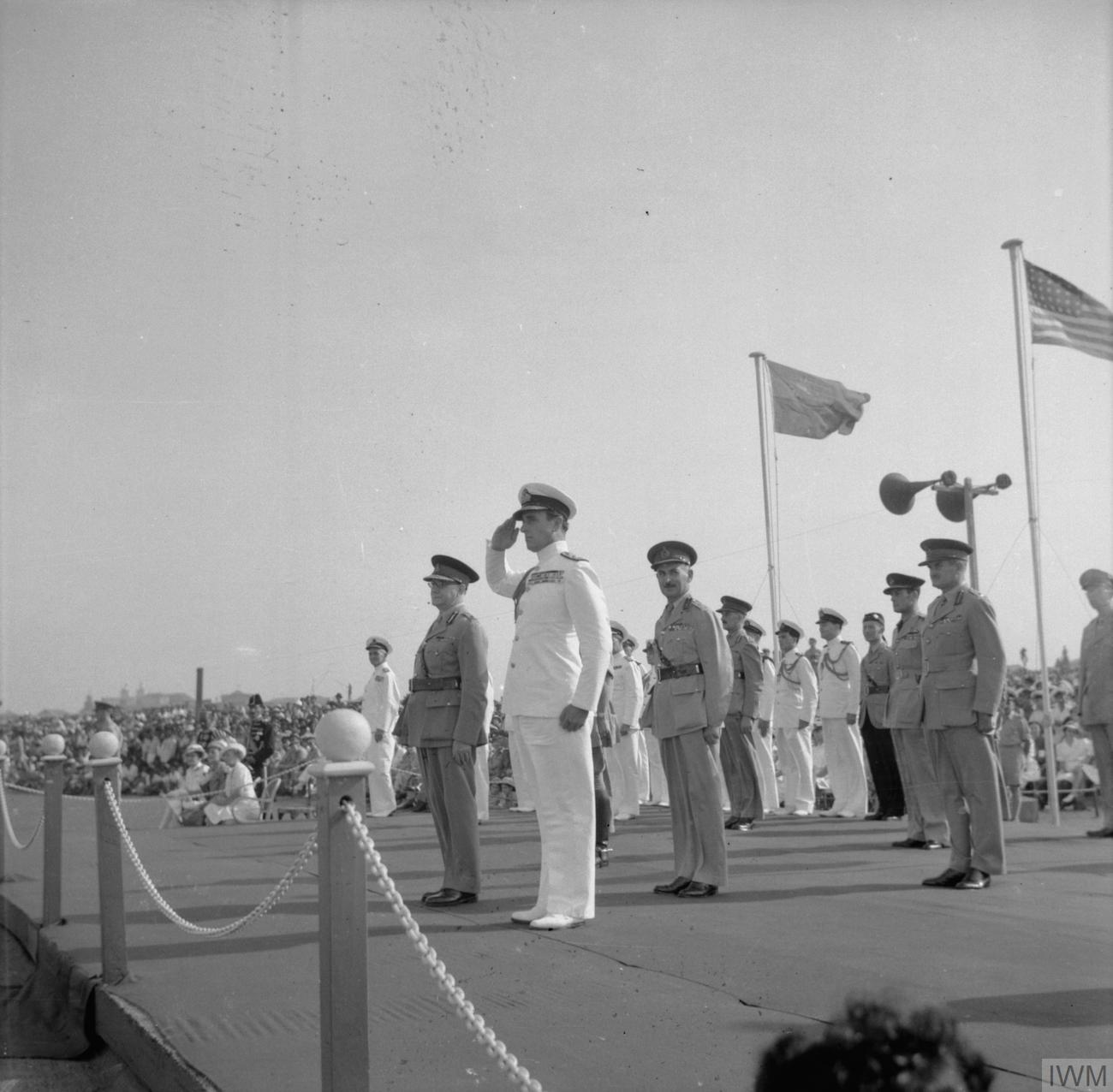
Lord Louis Mountbatten, Supreme Allied Commander, South East Asia, takes the salute during the VJ Day Parade on the Galle Face Green, Colombo, Ceylon.

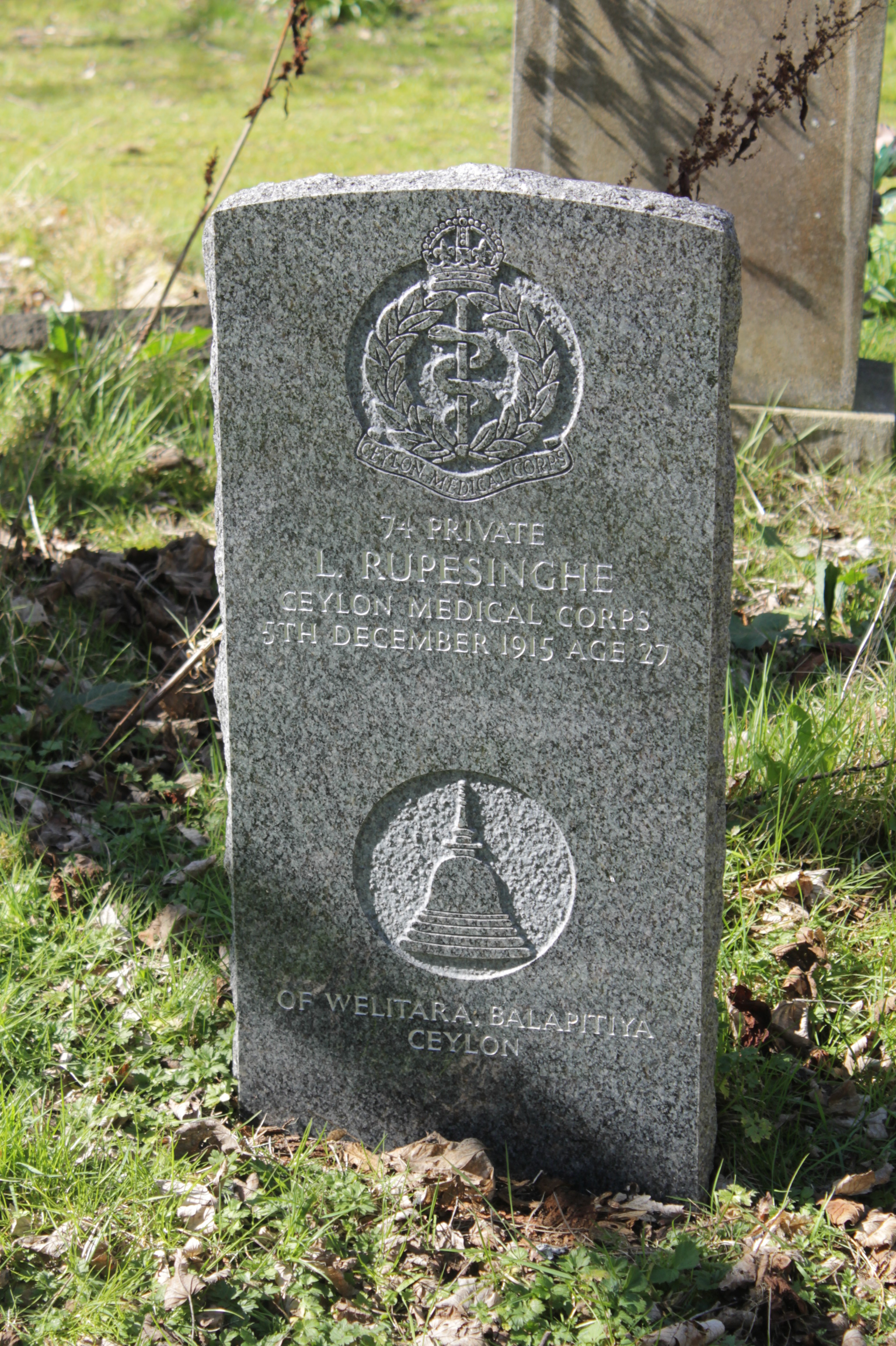
A war grave of Ceylon Medical Corps private in Newington Cemetery, Edinburgh.

There was some opposition to the war in Ceylon, particularly among the workers and the nationalists (such as the Ceylon National Congress), encouraged by the Trotskyist Lanka Sama Samaja Party (or "Samasamajists"), which supported the independence movement and led the anti-war movement, made it clear that it did not side with either the Axis powers or the Allies and considered the war an internationalist one. In 1940, the LSSP was banned; in response, the LSSP supported the pro-Japanese unrest in Cocos Islands.

The Communist Party of Ceylon too supported the anti-war movement as they saw it also as a war of imperialists, but in 1941 when Germany attacked the Soviet Union they joined the war movement in support of the British calling it a people's war. But much of the populace dreaded a Japanese victory.

Among Buddhists, there was anger that Buddhist monks of German origin were interned as 'enemy aliens' whereas German and Italian Roman Catholic priests were not. Two young members of the Governing Party, Junius Jayawardene (who later became President) and Dudley Senanayake (later the third Prime Minister), held discussions with the Japanese with a view to collaboration to oust the British. These discussions did not go further since the much older D. S. Senanayake (later the first Prime Minister) stopped them.

Independence agitators turned to opposition to the Ministers' support for the British war effort. The local Ministers brought motions gifting the Ceylonese taxpayers' money to the British war effort, which were opposed by the pro-independence members of the State Council. Propaganda was carried out among the troops, Australian and British as well as indigenous with little effect.

Starting in November 1939 and during the first half of 1940 there was a wave of spontaneous strikes on the British-owned plantations, basically aimed at winning the right of organisation. There were two main plantation unions, Natesa Iyer's Ceylon Indian Congress and the All-Ceylon Estate Workers Union (later the Lanka Estate Workers Union, LEWU) led by Samasamajists. In the Central Province the strike wave reached the zenith on the Mool Oya Estate strike, which was led by Samasamajists. After Mool Oya, the strike wave spread southward towards Uva, the strikes became more prolonged and the workers began to seek the militant leadership of the Samasamajists more and more. The Trotskyist leader N. M. Perera addressed a large meeting in Badulla on 12 May, and the police were powerless to act, although it was banned. At Wewessa Estate the workers set up an elected council and the Superintendent agreed to act in consultation with the Workers' Council. An armed police party that went to restore 'law and order' was disarmed by the workers. The strike wave at last was beaten back by a wave of terror by the police, aided by floods which cut Uva off from the rest of the country for over a week.

However, the colonial authorities were finding that the independence struggle was becoming too powerful. After Dunkirk, the British colonial authorities reacted in panic (as revealed in secret files released decades later) and the LSSP State Council members N. M. Perera and Philip Gunawardena and others were arrested on 18 June. The Samasamajist press was raided and sealed. Regulations were promulgated which made open party work practically impossible.

Public opposition to British colonial rule continued to grow. Among the elite there was irritation at the colour-bar practised by the leading clubs. Sir Oliver Ernest Goonetilleke, the Civil Defence Commissioner complained that the British commander of Ceylon, Admiral Layton called him a 'black bastard'.

Ceylonese in Japanese occupied Singapore and Malaya formed the 'Lanka Regiment' of the so called Indian National Army which had been established by Nazi Germany, directly under Netaji Subhas Chandra Bose. A plan was made to transport them to Ceylon by submarine, to begin the independence struggle, but this was abortive.

The LSSP leaders were able to escape, with the help of one of their guards. Several of them fled to India, where they participated in the struggle there, underscoring what had been established before the war, that India's and Ceylon's independence struggles were interlinked. However, a sizable contingent remained, led by Robert Gunawardena, Philip's brother.

== See also ==
- Sri Lankan Army
- Sri Lankan Navy
- The Easter Sunday Raid on Colombo
- Indian Ocean raid
- Military history of the British Commonwealth in the Second World War
