= D. V. Hunter =

Sri Lankan naval officer (born 1917)

Lieutenant D. V. Hunter Rear Admiral
- Born: Donald Victor Hunter; 1917; British Ceylon
- Died: Liverpool, NSW, Australia.
- Burial place: Lepington, NSW, Australia.
- Spouse(s): Barbara Kathleen Hunter nee, Toussaint.
- Military career
- Allegiance: British Ceylon; Sri Lanka
- Branch: Ceylon Naval Volunteer Force; Sri Lanka Navy
- Service years: 1938–1950; 1950–1973
- Rank: Rear admiral
- Nickname: Vic.
- Commands: Commander of the Sri Lankan Navy
- Conflicts: World War II; First JVP Insurrection
- Awards: 1939-1945 Star; Burma Star; Ceylon Armed Services Long Service Medal

Rear Admiral D. V. Hunter (born 1917) was a Sri Lankan naval officer, who served as the 7th Commander of the Sri Lankan Navy.

== Naval career ==
=== Ceylon Naval Volunteer Force ===
Hunter enlisted in the newly formed Ceylon Naval Volunteer Force (CNVF) as a signalman/gunner in the first intake of sailor on 21 October 1938. He was promoted to petty officer in 1941 and was commissioned as a probationary sub lieutenant in 1942 and was promoted to lieutenant in 1944. The CNVF was transferred to the Royal Navy, with the outbreak of World War II in the far east. Hunter served in all ships of the CNVF and commanded the MFV 185 as it sallied to Akyab taking part in the Burma campaign from 1944 to 1945. Reverting to his substantive rank at demobilization after the war, he was seconded to the Fisheries Department in 1949.

=== Royal Ceylon Navy ===
With the formation of the Royal Ceylon Navy in 1950, after the Navy Act was passed, Hunter transferred to a regular commission. In 1953, he attended several courses on Seaward Defense, Boom Defense and Salvage in the United Kingdom and was promoted to the rank of lieutenant commander. In 1960 he was promoted to the rank of commander and captain in 1965, undergoing training in pilot-age in Madras in 1963. In 1965, he was appointed commanding officer of the Volunteer Naval Force.

=== Captain of the Navy ===
Hunter was promoted to the rank of commodore and was appointed Captain of the Navy on 2 July 1970 succeeding Rajan Kadiragamar. Hunters tenor as head of the navy saw major changes and challengers. In April 1971, the JVP insurrection started catching the Ceylonese armed forces off-guard and unprepared. Naval personnel were deployed for shore duty for the defense of key state infrastructure and for counter-insurgency operations in-land. In 1972, Ceylon became a republic and the Royal Ceylon Navy became the Sri Lanka Navy, with changes in its insignia and names, including the post of Captain of the Navy, which became the Commander of the Navy in line with the other armed services. Hunter retired from the navy on 31 March 1973 and was promoted to the rank of rear admiral. He was succeeded by Basil Gunasekara.

== Honors ==
Admiral Hunter had been awarded the 1939–1945 Star, the Burma Star, the Defense Medal and the War Medal 1939–1945 for war service with the Ceylon Royal Naval Volunteer Reserve and for service in the Royal Ceylon Navy he received the Ceylon Armed Services Long Service Medal and the Ceylon Armed Services Inauguration Medal.

Military offices
Preceded by Rajan Kadiragamar	Commander of the Sri Lankan Navy; 1970-1973	Succeeded by Basil Gunasekara
