= HMS Gamunu =

HMS Gamunu was a shore establishment of the Royal Navy in Ceylon. With the Admiralty taking over the Ceylon Naval Volunteer Force in 1942, its headquarters at Kochchikade was commissioned as HMS Gamunu.

The headquarters of the Ceylon Naval Volunteer Force established in a purpose built building east side of the Port Commission Railway lines, in Kochchikade. Built at a cost of Rs 28,000, it provided office accommodation for the Commanding Officer, Staff Officers and Paymaster, messes and an armoury. It had a small parade ground and a 12 pound gun. The facilities were expanded in during World War 2 and remained Ceylon Royal Naval Volunteer Force headquarters after it was transferred back to the Government of Ceylon at the end of the war. It remained headquarters of the Volunteer Naval Force following the formation of the Royal Ceylon Navy in 1950, until it was handed over to the Ports Authority.

== See also ==
- SLNS Parakrama
