= SLNS Parakrama =

Sri Lankan naval shore establishment

- Colombo, Western Province
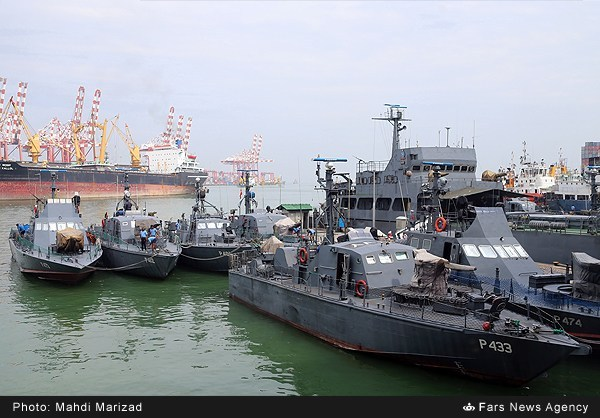
- Fast Attack Crafts docked in SLNS Parakrama

Site information
- Type: Naval Headquarters
- Controlled by: Sri Lanka Navy

Site history
- In use: 1940's – present

SLNS Parakrama is a Sri Lanka Navy shore establishment sited on Flagstaff Street in Colombo, in close proximity to the Colombo Lighthouse. It functions as the naval headquarters of the Navy. In this capacity it has the offices of the Commander of the Navy, Chief of Staff, the Board of Management (BOM) and Board of Directors (BOD) of the Sri Lanka Navy. All naval operations are directed from SLNS Parakrama. The base was formerly known as HMCyS Parakrama prior to 1972 and traces it establishment to HMS Lanka, the Royal Navy barracks in Colombo.

== See also ==
- HMS Gamunu
