= Ceylon Royal Naval Volunteer Reserve =

The Ceylon Royal Naval Volunteer Reserve was the volunteer naval reserve of the British Crown colony of Ceylon from 1938 to 1950. Established as the Ceylon Naval Volunteer Force (CNVF) on 1 January 1938 under the Naval Volunteer Ordinance, No, l of 1937. It was made up of volunteers mainly from the mercantile sector of Colombo consisting of 12 officers and 18 sailors, under the command of the newly commissioned Commander W. G. Beauchamp. The first headquarters of the force was set up on 11 January 1939 (formally opened on 14 June 1939), just before the outbreak of World War II, at Kochchikade.

== History ==
=== Formation ===
Following the Great War, calls on colonies to fund their own defence increase and with war looming in the 1930's the Governor of Ceylon enacted the Naval Volunteer Ordinance, No, l of 1937 under the Colonial Defence Act. of 1931, after it was ratified by the State Council of Ceylon. Prime movers of the initiative were Captain F.L. Berthon, Captain-in-charge, Ceylon and the Royal Ceylon Yacht Club, who pushed for a formation of a Volunteer Naval Force. Two executive officers with sea going experience, Merchant mariner Lieutenant F.B. Rigby-Smith of the Ceylon Wharfage Co., a Master Mariner Lieutenant P.J.B. Oakley, the Marine superintendent, P & O Lines, and two Paymaster Lieutenants Noel Gratiaen and Susantha de Fonseka were commissioned on 1 January 1938.

This was followed by W.G. Beauchamp, a Director of J.M. Robertson & Co. Ltd who was appointed in command and four more officers were commissioned. Recruitment and training of prospective officers and sailors started soon after. The first headquarters were set up at the old Ceylon Garrison Artillery building in Fort. Sea training was conducted on board harbour tugs, fisheries vessels, HMS Barnet, and ships of the East Indies stations with a training cruise on board HMS Norfolk. Following the end of initial training the force had 16 officers and 28 Signalman/Gunners. A new Headquarters building was built on the east side of the Port Commission Railway lines, in Kochchikade. In April 1939, Governor Caldecott requested the Admiralty to add the officers to the Navy List, which was accepted.

=== World War II ===
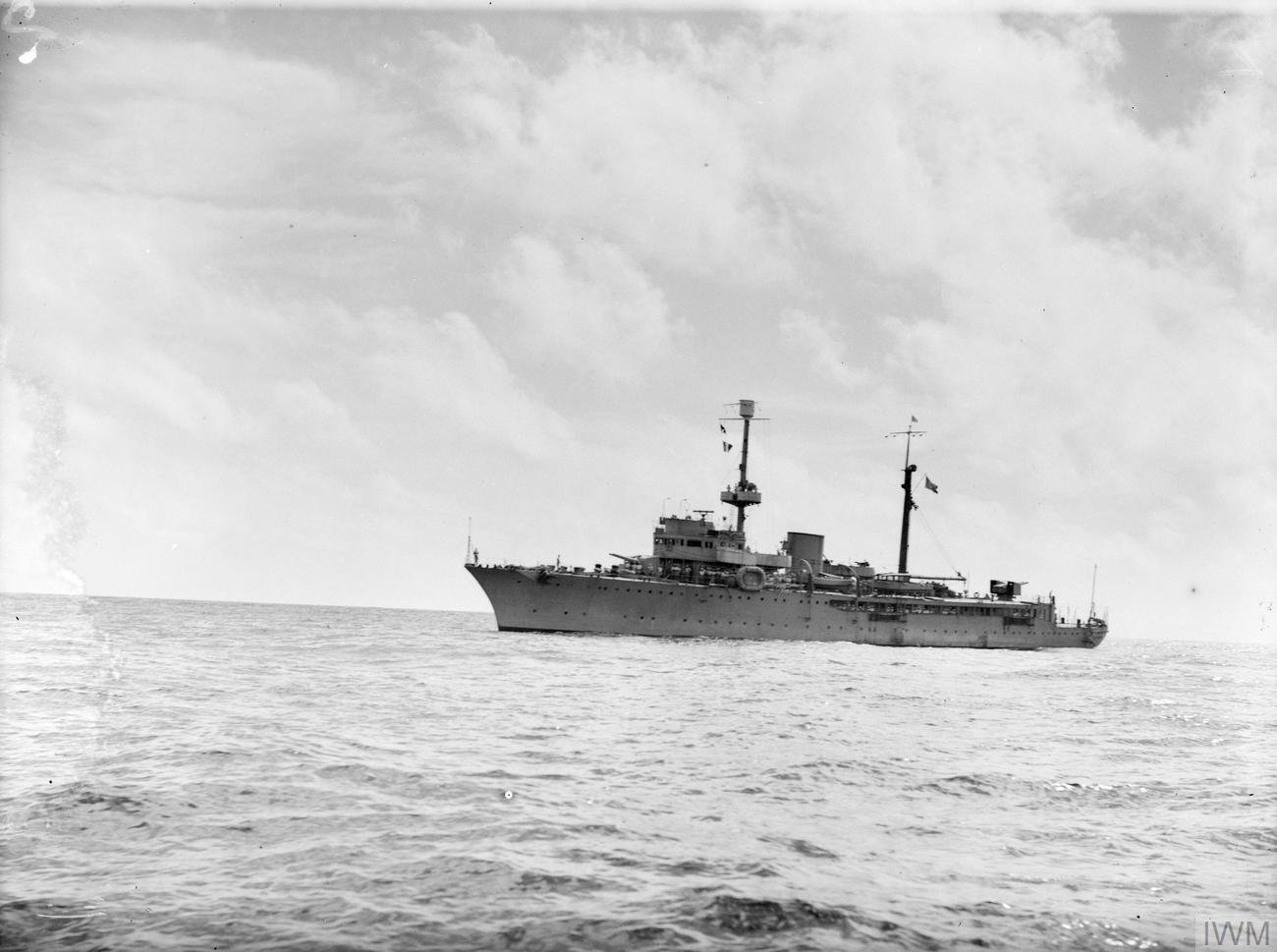
Eritrea, 14 September 1943 entering Port of Colombo to surrender, having been intercepted by HMS Overdale Wyke.

With the outbreak of World War II, the CNVF was mobilized for war service on 31 August 1939. The peace time force of weekend sailors had been trained as a seagoing force, trained for manning ships for minesweeping and anti submarine warfare. Following mobilization the Board of Ministers of the State Council set out rates of pay and allowances for members of the Ceylon Defence Force and the CNVF, removing their dependence on their substantive jobs. The CNVF formed a flotilla for harbour defence of the Colombo Harbour. It also deployed personal for shore duty at manning the signal station at Naval Office, Colombo and the Port War Signal Station (PWSS) at the Chapel Hill, Trincomalee. Personal were also deployed in Kandy and the headquarters expanded. CNVF took part in action during the Easter Sunday Raid on Colombo on 5 April 1942. During the attack Lt. Simpson moved the armed trawler Overdale Wyke close to HMS Hector which had been hit and ablaze to assist putting out its fires only missing a stick of bombs himself.

On 1 October 1943, the CNVF was placed under the command of the Royal Navy with the Admiralty taking over the financing and renamed the Ceylon Royal Naval Volunteer Reserve (CRNVR) becoming part of the Royal Naval Volunteer Reserve with a peak strength of 62 officers and 1,357 sailors. Its HQ in Kochchikade was commissioned HMS Gamunu. Trincomalee Naval area was under the command of the Naval Officer-in Charge, Trincomalee, NOIC (T) while the Colombo Naval area was under the command of the Captain-in-Charge, Ceylon. New branches and trades were added. Basic and some advance training was carried out in Ceylon, while some officers and sailors were sent to HMIS Machlimar at Versova and the Royal Indian Navy Anti Submarine School for advance training.

During the war, the CRNRF operated a flotilla of ships that included:

- HM Tugs Samson, Goliath
- HMS Overdale Wyke
- HMS Okapi, Semla, Sambhur
- HMS Hoxa, Balta
- HM Trawler Barnet, Tug C-405
- Motor Fishing Vessel (MFV) 17
- Dorothy Gordon
- MFV 186,187

These ships were meant to sweep and guard the approaches the harbours but were often used on extended missions outside Ceylon waters. In the course of these operations, the ships came under enemy fire, recovered essential information from Imperial Japanese aircraft that were shot down, sailed to Akyab (modern Sittwe) after the Burma front was opened in two FMVs for harbour duties, and were called upon to accept the surrender of the Italian sloop Eritrea and escort her to the Colombo port with a prize crew on board.

As the war came to an end, command and financing of the CRNVR was returned to the Government of Ceylon on 1 April 1946, reporting to the Chief Secretary of Ceylon. It retain the name Ceylon Royal Naval Volunteer Reserve.

In 1950, the Navy Act, No. 34 of 1950 was passed by the Parliament of Ceylon replacing the Naval Volunteer Ordinance, No, l of 1937. With it CRNVR ceased to exist and the Royal Ceylon Navy was formed with a regular and volunteer force. Several offices and sailors were transferred to regular naval force forming its nucleus, while 12 officers and 121 men, who were not on active service formed the core of the Royal Ceylon Volunteer Naval Force.

== Awards and decorations ==
- Decoration for Officers of the Royal Naval Volunteer Reserve (1938−1950)
- Royal Naval Volunteer Reserve Long Service and Good Conduct Medal (1938−1950)
- 1939–1945 Star (1939–1945)
- Burma Star (1939–1945)
- Defense Medal (1939–1945)
- War Medal 1939–1945 (1939–1945)

== Notable members ==
- Sir Susantha de Fonseka, KBE - former Deputy Speaker of the State Council and former Ambassador to Burma and Japan
- Justice Noel Gratiaen, CMG, QC - former Attorney General and Puisne Judge of the Supreme Court of Ceylon
- Rear Admiral Royce de Mel, OBE, ADC, RCyN - First Ceylonese Commander of the Royal Ceylon Navy (1955–1960)
- Rear Admiral Rajan Kadiragamar, MVO, ADC, RCyN - Commander of the Royal Ceylon Navy (1960–1970)
- Rear Admiral D. V. Hunter, SLN -Commander of the Sri Lanka Navy (1970–1972)
- Captain W. G. Beauchamp, VRD, CBE - first Commanding Officer, CRNVF

== See also ==
- Ceylon Defence Force
- Royal Naval Reserve
- Sri Lanka Volunteer Naval Force
- Sri Lanka Navy
