= G. E. S. de Silva =

Sri Lankan Navy officer

G.E.S. de Silva
- Military career
- Allegiance: Sri Lanka
- Branch: Sri Lanka Navy
- Rank: Commodore
- Unit: Sri Lanka Volunteer Naval Force
- Commands: Volunteer Naval Force
- Conflicts: Sri Lankan Civil War
- Awards: Prashansaniya Seva Vibhushanaya

G. E. S. de Silva was a Sri Lankan Volunteer Naval officer, accountant and athlete. He was the former commanding officer, VNF.

Educated at the prestigious Royal College Colombo, where he captained the college boxing team. An accountant by profession, he joined the Sri Lanka Volunteer Naval Force as a reservist, eventually becoming its commanding officer.

De Silva is a Fellow of the Chartered Management Institute and a Chartered Financial Analyst. Reaching the rank of commodore as one of the youngest to hold that rank and was later promoted to the post of Director Naval Administration, which he held until his retirement.

Commodore de Silva has been awarded the service medals Prashansaniya Seva Vibhushanaya and Sri Lanka Armed Services Long Service Medal.

A former Treasurer of the Royal College Union, he was Secretary General of the Sri Lanka Ex-Servicemen's Association. He is the brother-in-law of the former commander of the Sri Lankan Army, General Jagath Jayasuriya

== See also ==
- Sri Lanka Navy
