= Basil Gunasekara =

Sri Lankan naval officer (1929–2024)

Admiral Deshamanya Basil Gunasekara
- Born: 7 May 1929; Katana, Ceylon
- Died: 17 February 2024 (aged 94)
- Military career
- Allegiance: Sri Lanka
- Branch: Sri Lanka Navy
- Service years: 1950–1979
- Rank: Admiral
- Service number: NRX 0032
- Commands: Commander of the Sri Lanka Navy
- Conflicts: 1971 Insurrection, Sri Lankan Civil War
- Other work: Chairman, State Development and Construction Corporation, General Manager, Ceylon Match Company

Admiral Deshamanya D. Basil Gunasekara (7 May 1929 – 17 February 2024) was the Commander of the Sri Lanka Navy from 1973 to 1979.

== Early life and education ==
Born to a planter in Katana, Gunasekara was the youngest child of a family of five members. Educated at Mahinda College, Galle where he was a champion athlete and a member of the senior cricket team and then at the Royal College, Colombo where he was a senior cadet of the Royal College Cadet Contingent, a champion athlete and played Cricket for Royal College.

== Naval career ==
Gunasekara first joined the Ceylon Police Force as a Sub-Inspector of Police on the recommendation of DIG Sydney de Zoysa, Director of Police Training. However he resigned three years later to join the Royal Ceylon Navy as a direct entry Sub Lieutenant to the executive branch in 1951 and received his training at the Royal Naval College, Greenwich followed by specialized training at Portsmouth and Plymouth. On his return to Ceylon he was assigned to HMS Newfoundland, flagship of the Royal Navy's East Indies Fleet.

Gunasekara's first duty station was as training officer in the Naval Training Establishment at HMCyS Rangalla in Diyatalawa. In 1955 he was given his first command of a small base at Talai Mannar. During the 1958 communal riots he was sent to command the HMRCyS Tissa in Trincomalee which was the home of the Ceylon's Naval Fleet. Thereafter he underwent ASW at HMS Osprey in Portland. Making Lieutenant Commander in 1962 and attended Defence Services Staff College, Wellington in 1963. He served as an extra ADC to Governor General in 1965.

From 1964 to 1970, he served as a staff officer at the Naval Headquarters in Colombo before taking up command as the command of shore establishments in Colombo and Jaffna. In 1970 Commander Gunasekara was appointed Captain of HMRCy Gajabahu the flagship of the Royal Ceylon Navy. He became Chief of Staff of the Navy in 1971 and played a major role during 1971 JVP Insurrection, when naval personnel were deployed for shore duty to help the army and police in suppressing it. In 1972, he became the first Sri Lankan officer to attend the National Defence College, New Delhi.

In 1973 he was appointed Commander of the Sri Lanka Navy, promoted to rear admiral and would hold the post for six years retiring in 1979, with the rank of vice admiral. During this time his flag lieutenant was Lieutenant (later Admiral of the Fleet) Wasantha Karannagoda, who later became the Commander of the Navy.

== Honors ==
During his long career in the navy, he received the Republic of Sri Lanka Armed Services Medal, Sri Lanka Navy 25th Anniversary Medal, Ceylon Armed Services Long Service Medal and clasp, and the Ceylon Armed Services Inauguration Medal. He was awarded the title of Deshamanya by the Sri Lankan government and in 2007 he was promoted to the rank of admiral along with nine other former service commanders.

== Later life and death ==
After retirement, he served as general manager of Ceylon Match Company for 12 years and chairman, State Development and Construction Corporation for seven years. He was awarded the title of Deshamanya by the president of Sri Lanka for his services rendered to the country. He was the president of the Association of Flag Rank Officers (ARFRO). Gunasekara died on 17 February 2024, at the age of 94.

== Family ==
Admiral Gunasekara married Clara Nagahawatte, a daughter of a former mayor of Galle, E.D. Nagahawatta, in 1953, and they have four children Sriyanga, Piyal, Kapila and Ranil. Piyal Gunasekara joined the navy and went on to achieve the rank of commander before retiring after 20 years of service.

== See also ==
- Sri Lanka Navy

Military offices
Preceded by D. V. Hunter	Commander of the Sri Lanka Navy; 1973-1979	Succeeded by Henry Perera
