= HMS Overdale Wyke =

HMS Overdale Wyke (FY 338) was a Ceylonese steam turbine trawler launched in 1924, which served as a Minesweeping Trawler with the Ceylon Royal Naval Volunteer Reserve during World War 2.

== Naval service ==
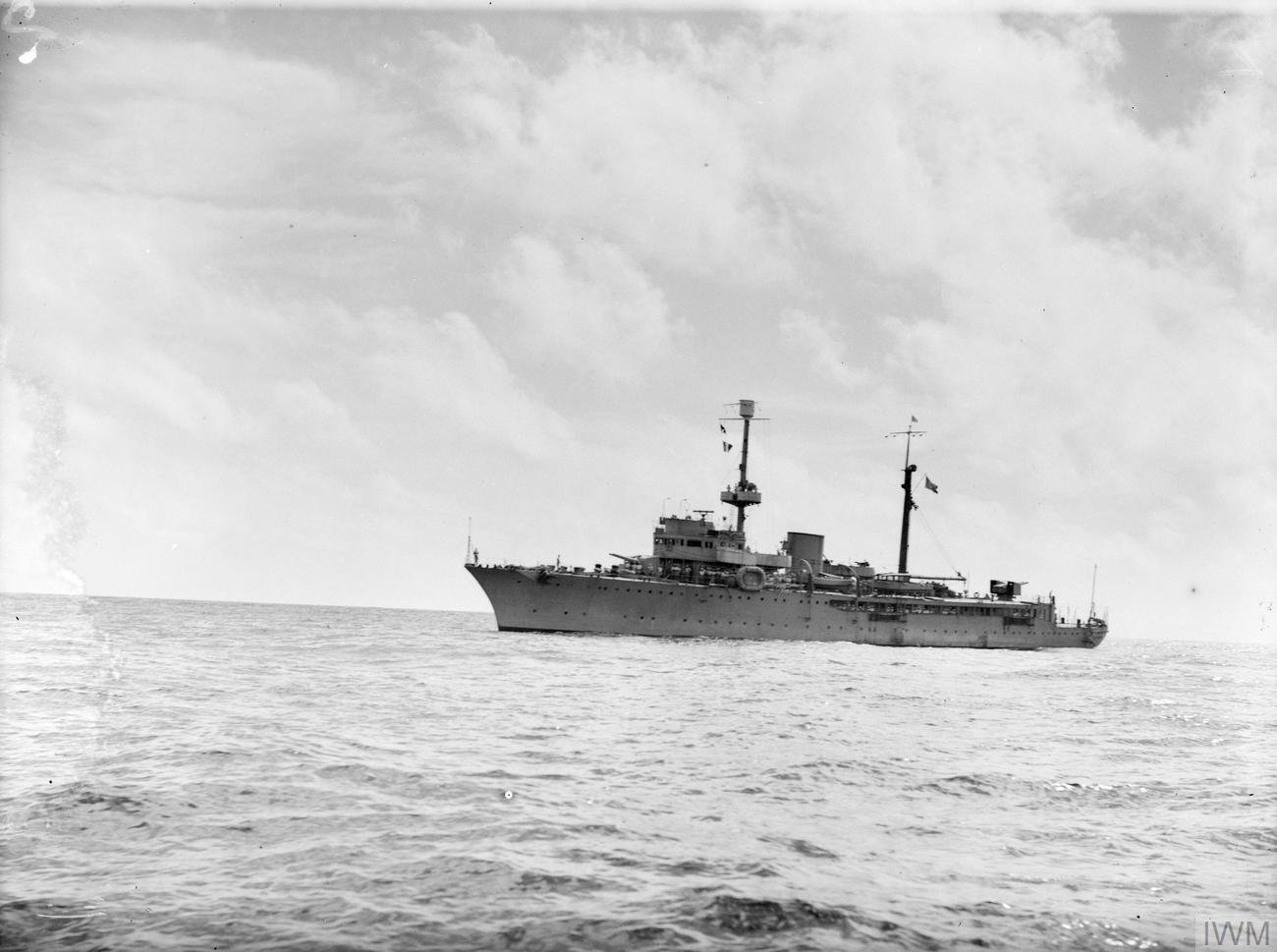
Eritrea, 14 September 1943 entering Port of Colombo to surrender, having been intercepted by HMS Overdale Wyke.

She was requisitioned into the service of the Royal Navy in 1939 as a Minesweeping Trawler with the name His Majesty's Trawler Overdale Wyke (HMT Overdale Wyke). It was later sold to the Government of Ceylon in 1941. It was fitted with minesweeping gear and armament and sailed to Port Said by a Royal Navy crew and was taken over by a Ceylon Naval Volunteer Reserve (CNVF) crew that included Lt. P.J.B. Oakley (C.O.), Lt. A.H.H. Boyns, Lt. B.A. Ohlson, Lt. A. Smith (Engineer), P/O Stanislaus, P/O (Tel) Rankine, P/O (SM) Bastiampillai, P/O (CK) Marshall and Stwd. Eric Perera leaving for Ceylon on 3 March 1941. She was commissioned as CNVF vessel as 15 March 1941. Between March 1941 and December 1944, HMS Overdale Wyke with a crew of 4 officers and 40 sailors took on multiple duties including patrolling, minesweeping, providing escort services, search-and-rescue work and anti-submarine attacks. On 5 April 1942, during the Easter Sunday Raid on Colombo, Lt. Simpson moved her close to HMS Hector which had been hit and ablaze to assist putting out its fires only missing a stick of bombs that fell on her former moorings. Along with other vessels of the CNVF the armed trawlers Hoxa and Balta; converted Antarctic whaler Okapi, Semla and Sambur supported by tugs Samson, Goliath and C-405; she formed part of the Ceylon Escort Group, which was later designated the ABCD (“Arabia-Bangala-Ceylon-Dutch East Indies”) group, carrying out patrol, escort, search-and-rescue, guard-ship and sundry other duties off Ceylon, Bay of Bengal and as far west as Addu Atoll and Diego Garcia. She also served as Guard ship at Addu Atoll, a secret RN port called “Port T”. She is credited with the rescue of several persons from sunken ships, and of carrying out depth charge attacks on enemy submarines, although she has not been credited with any “kills”. In September 1943, she intercepted and accepted the surrender of the Italian sloop Eritrea and escort her to the Colombo port with a prize crew on board. Following the end of the war she was decommissioned and remained in the Colombo harbour until she was sold for scrap. Her sole QF 12-pounder gun still stands at the entrance to SLNS Rangalle in the Port of Colombo.
