= Sri Lanka Volunteer Naval Force =

Blue Ensign flown by merchant vessels commanded by officers in the SLVNF.

The Sri Lanka Volunteer Naval Force (SLVNF) is the active-duty volunteer reserve force of the Sri Lanka Navy. The SLVNF, which consists of the volunteer force and the volunteer reserve is separate from the Regular Naval Force, which consists of the Regular Force consisting of professional naval officers and sailors, and its Regular Reserve, which comprises personal who have a mobilization obligation following their service in the regular force.

It is headquartered at SLNS Lanka, Welisara, and is tasked with a support and complementary role to the navy, partly by serving as a pool of civilian talent and expertise otherwise lacking in (and not regularly required by) the regular naval force, and partly by acting as a reserve force during times of war. SLVNF, which was established under the Navy Act, No. 34 of 1950, as the Royal Ceylon Volunteer Naval Force (RCVNF) which was renamed as the Sri Lanka Volunteer Naval Force in 1972.

== History ==
The Sri Lanka Volunteer Naval Force can trace its roots to the Ceylon Naval Volunteer Force (CNVF) of British Ceylon, and indeed predates its parent force, the Sri Lanka Navy, by several decades.

With Ceylonese independence on the horizon, the Government of Ceylon selected a core cadre of 100 servicemen and officers from the CRNVR to form a more regular arm of its military, in the late 1940s. The Navy Act, No. 34 of 1950 established the CRNVR as the Royal Ceylon Volunteer Naval Force (RCVNF) on 9 January 1951, alongside the Royal Ceylon Navy to which the 100 servicemen were transferred. Officers and seamen of the CRNVR not on active service on this date formed the core of the RCVNF, with a strength of 12 officers and 121 men. To keep the port H.M.Cy.S. TISSA safe, Port Commission Officers were commissioned as a separate division of the VNF, with Captain M. Chandrasoma as Commanding Officer; this division was disbanded in 1956.

The Sri Lankan Constitution of 1972 saw the nation become a republic; the Dominion of Ceylon became the Democratic Socialist Republic of Sri Lanka. As with the other branches of the Ceylonese armed forces, the Royal Ceylon Volunteer Naval Force too underwent a rechristening, becoming the Sri Lanka Volunteer Naval Force (SLVNF). Since then, the SLVNF has been a key support mechanism to the Sri Lanka Navy during its operations in the Eelam Wars.

== Recruitment ==
Citizens with a professional civilian career, in the state- or private sector are eligible to volunteer as officers of the SLVNF, provided they meet educational and professional qualification requirements. Ordinary ratings are recruited to either the reserves or to the active Seamen branch, with leave from active duty being granted in 5-year blocks. Tradesmen in particular are encouraged to volunteer through the SLVNF's Volunteer Special Scheme, which seeks to act as a pool of civil- and tradesman talent/experience.

All members of the SLVNF are entitled to pensions and other remunerations on the same scale as the regular force.

== Awards and decorations ==
- Prashansaniya Seva Vibhushanaya - 1972. Awarded to commissioned officers
- Prashansaniya Seva Padakkama - 1972. Awarded to all other ranks/rates

== Notable members ==
- Rear Admiral Palitha Fernando, PC, VNF - Judge Advocate of the Sri Lanka Navy
- Commodore G.E.S. de Silva, PSV, FCMA, FCFA, FCMI, VNF - Commanding Officer, VNF

== See also ==
- Sri Lanka Army Volunteer Force
- Sri Lanka Volunteer Air Force
- Royal Naval Reserve
