= Kadirgamar =

Kadirgamar is a Sri Lankan surname. Notable people with the surname include:

- Lakshman Kadirgamar (1932–2005), Sri Lankan lawyer
- Samuel Kadirgamar I, Ceylonese proctor
- Sam Kadirgamar, Sri Lankan lawyer
- Silan Kadirgamar (1934–2015), Sri Lankan Tamil academic, historian, and author
