= Sport in Central Province, Sri Lanka =

Sport in the Central Province of Sri Lanka has produced sports people in Sri Lanka for a wide range of sports. Sport in the Central Province is mainly dominated by Kandy who have produced national captains of cricket and rugby, and athletes that play at the highest level of all sports.

== Team sports ==
=== Cricket ===
Cricket has been played in the Kandy District since around 1863. It was mainly played in the Knuckles/Rangala areas and the Kandy city had the Kandy Dancing, Boating, and Rowing Club. In 1896 this club became the Kandy Sports club.

Ceylon's first unofficial test was played at Bogambara Grounds in 1889. The Kandy Sports Club was an exclusive European club however from 1920 onwards invited locals to play. In 1914 and 1916's Bogambara and Trinity College Grounds Asgiriya hosted overseas teams and in 1935 an Indian University Occasionals team met Up-Country cricket team.

16 August 1946 saw the revival of the Kandy District Cricket Association with Dr. V.H.L. Anthonisz as Secretary and Col. Gordon Pyper President. Shortly after the Central Province Cricket Association was formed with Dr. V.H.L. Anthonisz as President, the Dr. V.H.L Anthoniez shield was established for competition amongst Clubs in the Kandy District. The teams that participated in the shield were Kandy Sports Club, University Scheme SC, Kandy YMCA and the Kandy Young Men's Buddhist Association Sports Club. The first tournament was won by Francis Amerasinghe led Kandy Sports Club. In 1947 the Ceylon Cricket Association conducted a Zonal Tournament in which the Central Province Cricket Association participated. The Kandy District team was styled as the Central Zone and was led by Phillip Bultjens in the two-day matches.

Central Province Cricket Association hosted many international teams including the 1st Commonwealth Team in 1950, 2nd Commonwealth Team in 1951, MCC in 1952, All India in 1956, Pakistan 1964, Hyderabad Blues 1966, State Bank of India 1967, MCC 1969, Australia 1969, MCC 1973, India 1974 and Pakistan 1976 played three matches against Board Presidents XI, while Joe Listers Team played a two-day match against the Government Services CA at the Campus Grounds Peradeniya.

Sri Lanka's test era in the Central Province in Kandy began with a five-day match on 22 February 1983 against the Australians at Asgiriya Stadium making it Sri Lanka's third test venue and the 54th Test venue in the World. Since this game almost every team visited has played at this ground, till the last Test held in 2007. The inaugural test with Australia began in April 1983 then came New Zealand, India, Pakistan, England, and South Africa.

=== Netball ===
The first Netball game was played in Sri Lanka by Ceylon Girl Guide Company at Kandy High School in 1921.

=== Rugby Union ===
Rugby union is the most popular sport in the region. This is because of the local rugby union club, Kandy Sports Club being the reigning Club Rugby Champions in the national league for almost a decade, as well as the fondness and support the local schools treat the sport with. The Singer Sri Lankan Airlines Rugby 7's tournament is an annual international rugby union event held at the local Bogambara Stadium, attracting nations from all over the world.
