= Bradby Shield Encounter =

Annual school rugby competition in Sri Lanka between Royal and Trinity

The Bradby Shield

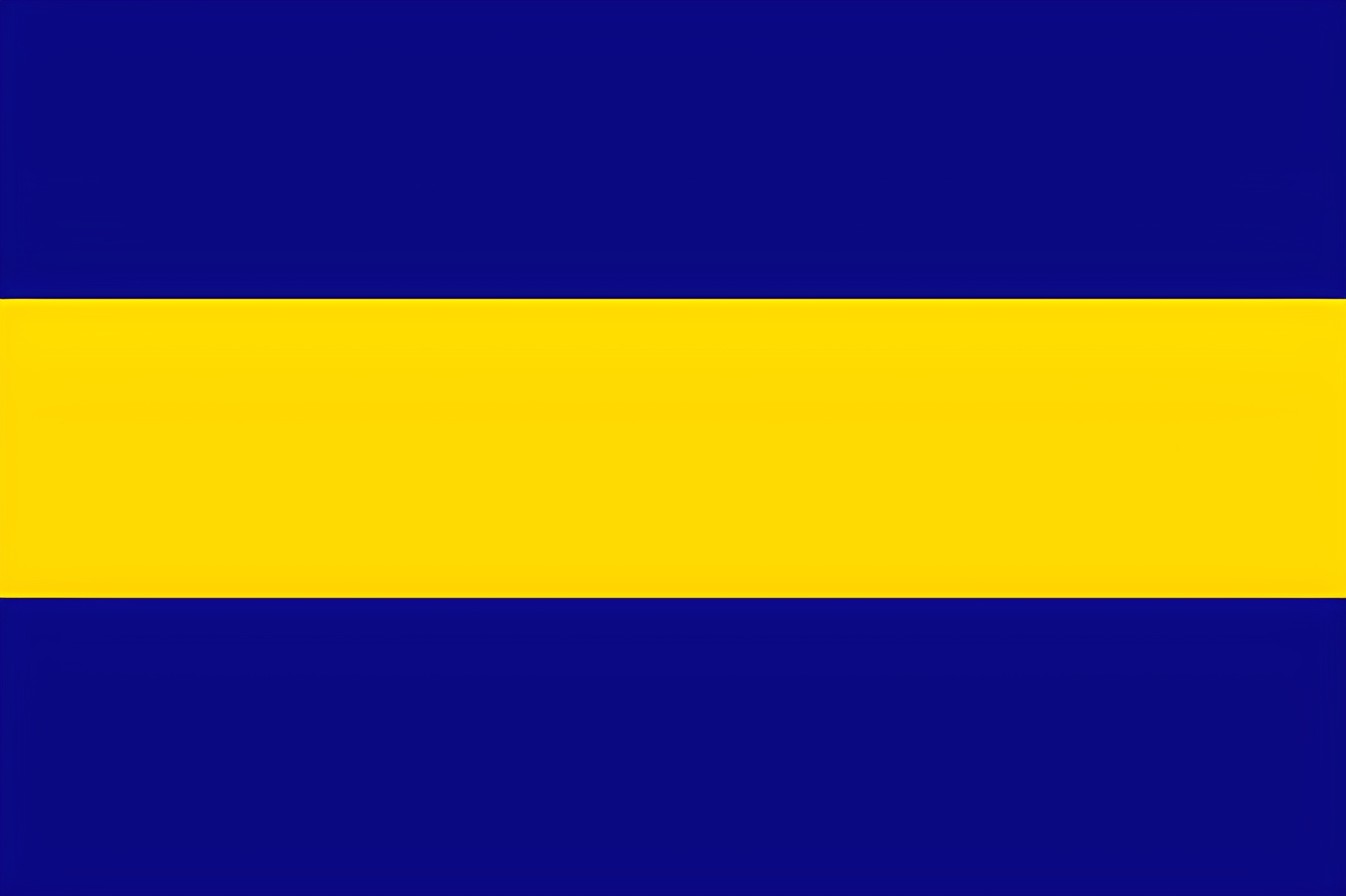
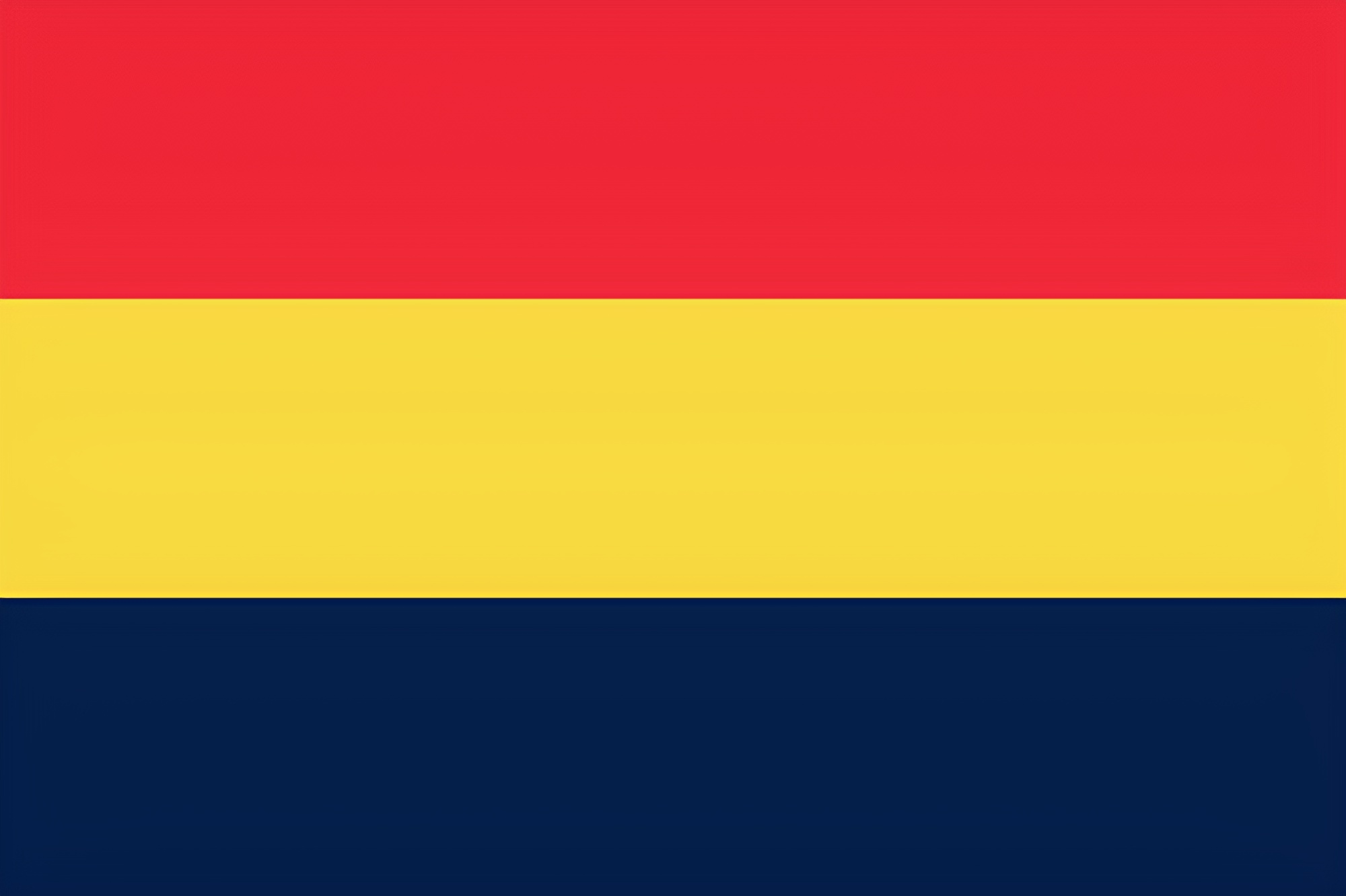
- Royal College Trinity College
- Sport: Rugby union
- First meeting: 1945; 81 years ago: Trinity 6, Royal 3
- Latest meeting: 2026: Trinity 72, Royal 20
- Next meeting: 2027
- Stadiums: Royal College Sports Complex; Trinity College Rugby Stadium
- Trophy: The Bradby Shield

Statistics
- Total meetings: 80
- All-time series: Trinity leads, 41–37–2
- Largest victory: Royal, 83–0 (2002)
- Longest win streak: Trinity, 6 (1952–1957)
- Current win streak: Trinity, 1 (2026)

Location Map
1 Royal College
2 Royal College Sports Complex
3 Trinity College
4 Trinity College Rugby Stadium

The Bradby Shield Encounter, colloquially referred to as The Bradby, is an event within Sri Lanka's school rugby union season. This annual fixture takes place between two renowned boys' schools in the country, namely Royal College, Colombo, and Trinity College, Kandy. The encounter involves two legs, with one currently held at the Royal College Sports Complex in Colombo and the other at the Trinity College Rugby Stadium in Pallekele. The winner of the competition is determined based on the aggregate of scores from both matches, typically played a couple of weeks apart.

This rugby fixture garners significant attention from spectators across the country. It is considered the most widely viewed rugby match in Sri Lanka, drawing larger crowds than both inter-club and international fixtures. This important event serves as a social gathering for the current and past pupils, their families, extended families and well-wishers with near-capacity attendance at venues and a significant viewership for the live broadcasts, both domestically and internationally.

== History ==
Royal College and Trinity College were among the pioneers in embracing the game of rugby union in British Ceylon, with their maiden match held on 31 July 1920, marking a historic milestone. Subsequently, this encounter evolved into a yearly tradition, where Trinity College maintained an unbeaten streak for the first two decades, until their first defeat to Royal College in 1941. In 1943, the format evolved into a two-match series.

In 1945, E. L. Bradby, the principal of Royal College, extended an offer to C. E. Simithraaratchy, the principal of Trinity College, proposing the donation of a coveted Shield. Simithraaratchy accepted this proposal. The Shield was to be contested annually, with the victor being the college that achieved the highest total score over the two-leg series, one leg played in Colombo and the other in Kandy, as initiated in 1943.

This annual event has persevered through the years, with the exception of the year 1971, where only the first leg was played due to the 1971 JVP insurrection. The Shield was presented to Royal College, the victors of the first leg. The COVID-19 pandemic forced the cancellation of the event in both 2020 and 2021, marking the only other time in which this event could not take place.

== The Shield ==
The shield, crafted by Kandyan silversmiths, was presented to the series by E. L. Bradby in 1945, at the end of his tenure as principal of Royal College. It is a wooden disk adorned with traditional Kandyan silverwork, symbolising victory.

After the second leg of the series, the shield is awarded to the winning team's captain during an on-field ceremony. The team retains the trophy until the next year's competition.

== Venue ==
The Bradby Shield encounter is generally played in two legs, one in Colombo and the other in Kandy. Historically, the Colombo match was played at Longden Place, and since 1987, at the Sugathadasa Stadium. Matches were relocated to the Royal College Sports Complex in 2002, where they have been hosted ever since. Meanwhile, the Kandy leg of the tournament was held at the Bogambara Stadium or at the Nittawela Rugby Stadium. Trinity College's home ground, the Trinity College Rugby Stadium in Pallekele, hosted its first Bradby Shield match in 1997 and, since 2012, has regularly hosted the Kandy leg of the event.

=== Locations and key abbreviations ===
As of match played 21 June 1997

List of venues: 1920–present
| No. | Venue | Location | First match | Abbreviated as | Coordinates |
|---|---|---|---|---|---|
| 1 | University of Colombo Grounds | Colombo | 31 July 1920 | Thurstan Road | 6°54′10″N 79°51′53″E |
| 2 | Bogambara Stadium | Kandy | 4 August 1922 | Bogambara | 7°17′20″N 80°38′08″E |
| 3 | Royal College Sports Complex | Colombo | 28 July 1923 | Reid Avenue (1923–1949); RCSC (since 2012) | 6°54′10″N 79°51′53″E |
| 4 | CR & FC Grounds | Colombo | 25 July 1931 | Longden Place | 6°54′02″N 79°52′15″E |
| 5 | Police Park | Colombo | 11 July 1943 | Police Park | 6°53′39″N 79°51′45″E |
| 6 | Colombo Racecourse | Colombo | 13 July 1945 | Racecourse | 6°54′18″N 79°51′50″E |
| 7 | Nittawela Rugby Stadium | Kandy | 26 July 1958 | Nittawela | 7°18′59″N 80°38′04″E |
| 8 | Havelock Park | Colombo | 2 July 1960 | Havelock Park | 6°53′14″N 79°52′00″E |
| 9 | University Rugby Football Grounds | Peradeniya | 16 July 1960 | Peradeniya | 7°15′30″N 80°35′45″E |
| 10 | CH & FC Grounds | Colombo | 21 July 1973 | Maitland Crescent | 6°54′28″N 79°51′57″E |
| 11 | Sugathadasa Stadium | Colombo | 18 July 1987 | Sugathadasa | 6°56′53″N 79°52′08″E |
| 12 | Trinity College Rugby Stadium | Pallekele | 21 June 1997 | TCRS | 7°16′45″N 80°42′34″E |

== Inter-school rugby encounters: 1920–1944 ==
=== Statistics ===
As of match played 21 July 1944

Match statistics
| Venue | Played | Won by | | Drawn | Total points | |
| Venue | Played | Royal | Trinity | Drawn | Royal | Trinity |
|---|---|---|---|---|---|---|
| Colombo | 13 | 2 | 11 | – | 26 | 247 |
| Kandy | 9 | 1 | 8 | – | 27 | 163 |
| Overall | 22 | 3 | 19 | – | 53 | 410 |

=== Results ===
As of match played 21 July 1944

Results: 1920–1944
| Match | Year | Captains | | Date | Venue | Score | | Winner |
| Match | Year | Royal | Trinity | Date | Venue | Royal | Trinity | Winner |
|---|---|---|---|---|---|---|---|---|
| 1 | 1920 | C. G. A. Perera | H. Ellis | 31 July | Thurstan Road | 0 | 26 | Trinity |
| – | 1921 | Not played | | | | | | |
| 2 | 1922 | G. H. Senarathne | A. P. Maralande | 4 August | Bogambara | 0 | 34 | Trinity (2) |
| 3 | 1923 | W. P. L. Abeyratne | P. A. Buultjens | 28 July | Reid Avenue | 0 | 17 | Trinity (3) |
| 4 | 1924 | J. R. Jayewardene | P. A. Buultjens | 1 August | Bogambara | 3 | 37 | Trinity (4) |
| 5 | 1925 | D. W. L. Lieversz (Snr.) | A. N. Myanga | 18 July | Thurstan Road | 0 | 46 | Trinity (5) |
| – | 1926 | Not played | | | | | | |
| – | 1927 | Not played | | | | | | |
| 6 | 1928 | H. S. Roberts | M. Khin Maung | 4 August | Reid Avenue | 6 | 23 | Trinity (6) |
| – | 1929 | Not played | | | | | | |
| 7 | 1930 | R. C. W. Paulusz | J. Duncan | 5 August | Bogambara | 0 | 29 | Trinity (7) |
| 8 | 1931 | G. A. K. Rockwood | J. Duncan | 25 July | Longden Place | 0 | 27 | Trinity (8) |
| 9 | 1932 | S. A. Dissanyake | S. Ratwatte | 30 July | Bogambara | 0 | 9 | Trinity (9) |
| 10 | 1933 | M. S. Ahamath | E. W. A. Buultjens | 15 July | Reid Avenue | 0 | 19 | Trinity (10) |
| – | 1934 | Not played | | | | | | |
| 11 | 1935 | W. B. V. Thiedeman | R. Breckenridge | 13 July | Reid Avenue | 0 | 19 | Trinity (11) |
| 12 | 1936 | C. de S. Illesinghe | O. L. Izzadeen | 11 July | Bogambara | 3 | 11 | Trinity (12) |
| 13 | 1937 | E. I. Grey | O. L. Izzadeen | 17 July | Reid Avenue | 0 | 16 | Trinity (13) |
| 14 | 1938 | R. H. Aldons | W. Molegoda | 25 June | Bogambara | 13 | 14 | Trinity (14) |
| 15 | 1939 | S. E. Toussaint | V. K. Vellayan | 29 July | Reid Avenue | 3 | 14 | Trinity (15) |
| 16 | 1940 | R. Kadiragamar | S. B. Dissanayake | 20 July | Bogambara | 3 | 9 | Trinity (16) |
| 17 | 1941 | M. N. Jilla | S. B. Dissanayake | 12 July | Reid Avenue | 11 | 3 | Royal |
| 18 | 1942 | A. R. Demmer | W. Jenkins | 25 July | Reid Avenue | 0 | 22 | Trinity (17) |
| 19 | 1943 | C. O. Foenander | W. Jenkins | 11 July | Police Park | 6 | 0 | Royal (2) |
| 20 | 1943 | S. Navaratnam | W. Jenkins | 24 July | Bogambara | 5 | 3 | Royal (3) |
| 21 | 1944 | N. Vancuylenberg | M. G. Wright | 7 July | Thurstan Road | 0 | 15 | Trinity (18) |
| 22 | 1944 | N. Vancuylenberg | M. G. Wright | 21 July | Bogambara | 0 | 17 | Trinity (19) |

== Bradby Shield series: 1945–present ==
=== Statistics ===
As of match played 25 July 2026

Series statistics (Note: Due to the JVP insurrection, only the first leg was played in 1971.) (Note: Due to the COVID-19 pandemic, the series was suspended in 2020 and 2021.)
| Played | Won by | | Drawn |
| Played | Royal | Trinity | Drawn |
|---|---|---|---|
| 80 | 37 | 41 | 2 |

Match statistics
| Venue | Played | Won by | | Drawn | Total points | |
| Venue | Played | Royal | Trinity | Drawn | Royal | Trinity |
|---|---|---|---|---|---|---|
| Colombo | 80 | 41 | 33 | 6 | 935 | 793 |
| Kandy | 79 | 32 | 42 | 5 | 814 | 868 |
| Overall | 159 | 73 | 75 | 11 | 1,749 | 1,661 |

=== Results of the last encounter ===
80th Bradby Shield 2026 (first leg)

11 July 2026
16:15 SLST

| Royal | 10–33 | Trinity |
| Try: S. Ranasinghe '41 c Con: K. Hewage (1/1) '41; Pen: S. Ranasinghe (1/2) 13' | Report | Try: K. Weerakoon '24 c M. Yaddehige '52 c H. Abdeen '60 m B. Nazeer '65 c H. Jayasinghe '70 c Con: S. Althaf (4/5) '24, '52, '65, '70 |

Royal College Sports Complex, Colombo
Referee: Meitetsu Shimizu (JRFU)

80th Bradby Shield 2026 (second leg)

25 July 2026
16:15 SLST

| Trinity | 39–10 | Royal |
| Try: E. Jayasena '31 c A. Faizal '42 c M. de Silva '46 c S. Althaf '52 c A. Jayasena '59 m Con: A. Faizal (2/2) '31, '52; S. Althaf (2/3) '42, '46; Pen: S. Althaf (2/2) '9, '29 | Report | Try: D. Pathirana (2) '39 m, '68 m |

Trinity College Rugby Stadium, Pallekele
Referee: Yusaku Murata (JRFU)

=== Results ===
As of match played 25 July 2026

Bradby Shield Encounter: 1945–present
| Series | Year | Captains | | Date | Venue | Score | | Winner | Ref. |
| Series | Year | Royal | Trinity | Date | Venue | Royal | Trinity | Winner | Ref. |
|---|---|---|---|---|---|---|---|---|---|
| 1 | 1945 | C. D. L. Fernando | R. G. Sourjah (1L); S. B. Pilapitiya (2L) | 13 July | Racecourse | 3 | 0 | Trinity | |
| 1 | 1945 | C. D. L. Fernando | R. G. Sourjah (1L); S. B. Pilapitiya (2L) | 20 July | Bogambara | 0 | 6 | Trinity | |
| 2 | 1946 | M. Rodrigo | S. B. Pilapitiya | 6 July | Police Park | 3 | 0 | Trinity (2) | |
| 2 | 1946 | M. Rodrigo | S. B. Pilapitiya | 20 July | Bogambara | 0 | 8 | Trinity (2) | |
| 3 | 1947 | N. W. Karunaratne | G. Sanmugam | 12 July | Bogambara | 0 | 6 | Trinity (3) | |
| 3 | 1947 | N. W. Karunaratne | G. Sanmugam | 9 August | Police Park | 0 | 0 | Trinity (3) | |
| 4 | 1948 | A. A. Cader | A. R. A. Mohomed | 3 July | Police Park | 6 | 3 | Royal | |
| 4 | 1948 | A. A. Cader | A. R. A. Mohomed | 17 July | Bogambara | 8 | 6 | Royal | |
| 5 | 1949 | G. C. Weinman | K. Arumugam | 3 July | Reid Avenue | 5 | 3 | Royal (2) | |
| 5 | 1949 | G. C. Weinman | K. Arumugam | 16 July | Bogambara | 8 | 3 | Royal (2) | |
| 6 | 1950 | T. St. C. Anghie | S. S. Bambaradeniya | 8 June | Bogambara | 0 | 6 | Trinity (4) | |
| 6 | 1950 | T. St. C. Anghie | S. S. Bambaradeniya | 24 July | Racecourse | 3 | 5 | Trinity (4) | |
| 7 | 1951 | H. E. Wijesinghe | M. S. Panditharatne | 4 July | Longden Place | 19 | 3 | Royal (3) | |
| 7 | 1951 | H. E. Wijesinghe | M. S. Panditharatne | 21 July | Bogambara | 13 | 5 | Royal (3) | |
| 8 | 1952 | A. B. Van Twest | M. S. Panditharatne | 5 July | Police Park | 0 | 6 | Trinity (5) | |
| 8 | 1952 | A. B. Van Twest | M. S. Panditharatne | 19 July | Bogambara | 0 | 12 | Trinity (5) | |
| 9 | 1953 | T. S. Almeida (1L); T. L. K. Mendis (2L) | D. Madugalle | 4 July | Bogambara | 0 | 13 | Trinity (6) | |
| 9 | 1953 | T. S. Almeida (1L); T. L. K. Mendis (2L) | D. Madugalle | 22 July | Longden Place | 0 | 3 | Trinity (6) | |
| 10 | 1954 | K. W. W. Edwards | L. L. Vitharana | 10 July | Longden Place | 0 | 5 | Trinity (7) | |
| 10 | 1954 | K. W. W. Edwards | L. L. Vitharana | 24 July | Bogambara | 5 | 6 | Trinity (7) | |
| 11 | 1955 | C. V. Gunaratne | M. G. Ratwatte | 11 July | Bogambara | 0 | 6 | Trinity (8) | |
| 11 | 1955 | C. V. Gunaratne | M. G. Ratwatte | 20 July | Longden Place | 0 | 0 | Trinity (8) | |
| 12 | 1956 | T. L. Almeida | D. N. Frank | 4 July | Racecourse | 0 | 15 | Trinity (9) | |
| 12 | 1956 | T. L. Almeida | D. N. Frank | 28 July | Bogambara | 0 | 11 | Trinity (9) | |
| 13 | 1957 | R. Sivaratnam | K. B. de Joedt | 6 July | Bogambara | 0 | 8 | Trinity (10) | |
| 13 | 1957 | R. Sivaratnam | K. B. de Joedt | 19 July | Longden Place | 8 | 9 | Trinity (10) | |
| 14 | 1958 | D. N. Fernando | K. B. de Joedt | 12 July | Longden Place | 6 | 0 | Royal (4) | |
| 14 | 1958 | D. N. Fernando | K. B. de Joedt | 26 July | Nittawela | 0 | 0 | Royal (4) | |
| 15 | 1959 | M. L. Anghie | D. L. Kobbekaduwa | 4 July | Bogambara | 5 | 0 | Royal (5) | |
| 15 | 1959 | M. L. Anghie | D. L. Kobbekaduwa | 18 July | Longden Place | 6 | 0 | Royal (5) | |
| 16 | 1960 | H. S. de Silva | E. D. K. Roles | 2 July | Havelock Park | 3 | 5 | Trinity (11) | |
| 16 | 1960 | H. S. de Silva | E. D. K. Roles | 16 July | Peradeniya | 0 | 8 | Trinity (11) | |
| 17 | 1961 | J. V. P. Samarasekara | J. W. Jayawardena | 1 July | Bogambara | 6 | 3 | Royal (6) | |
| 17 | 1961 | J. V. P. Samarasekara | J. W. Jayawardena | 15 July | Longden Place | 8 | 0 | Royal (6) | |
| 18 | 1962 | U. L. Kaluaratchi | N. T. E. Brohier | 14 July | Longden Place | 5 | 0 | Trinity (12) | |
| 18 | 1962 | U. L. Kaluaratchi | N. T. E. Brohier | 28 July | Bogambara | 0 | 9 | Trinity (12) | |
| 19 | 1963 | M. Jayakumar | B. D. A. Piyasena | 11 July | Bogambara | 6 | 6 | Trinity (13) | |
| 19 | 1963 | M. Jayakumar | B. D. A. Piyasena | 27 July | Longden Place | 3 | 5 | Trinity (13) | |
| 20 | 1964 | K. D. T. Paul | M. T. Sahayam | 11 July | Longden Place | 3 | 0 | Royal (7) | |
| 20 | 1964 | K. D. T. Paul | M. T. Sahayam | 25 July | Nittawela | 14 | 6 | Royal (7) | |
| 21 | 1965 | U. P. Wickramasinghe | M. T. M. Zarook | 10 July | Nittawela | 8 | 3 | Royal (8) | |
| 21 | 1965 | U. P. Wickramasinghe | M. T. M. Zarook | 24 July | Longden Place | 3 | 3 | Royal (8) | |
| 22 | 1966 | I. R. Thurairatnam | E. G. Van Langenberg | 9 July | Longden Place | 3 | 3 | Trinity (14) | |
| 22 | 1966 | I. R. Thurairatnam | E. G. Van Langenberg | 23 July | Bogambara | 3 | 8 | Trinity (14) | |
| 23 | 1967 | D. J. Perera (1L); N. B. L. Lieversz (2L) | A. L. Abeyratne | 4 July | Peradeniya | 3 | 17 | Trinity (15) | |
| 23 | 1967 | D. J. Perera (1L); N. B. L. Lieversz (2L) | A. L. Abeyratne | 20 July | Longden Place | 3 | 16 | Trinity (15) | |
| 24 | 1968 | C. R. de Silva | A. L. Abeyratne | 9 July | Longden Place | 19 | 0 | Royal (9) | |
| 24 | 1968 | C. R. de Silva | A. L. Abeyratne | 24 July | Peradeniya | 5 | 3 | Royal (9) | |
| 25 | 1969 | M. H. C. Malwatte | M. S. Jainudeen | 5 July | Peradeniya | 0 | 8 | Trinity (16) | |
| 25 | 1969 | M. H. C. Malwatte | M. S. Jainudeen | 18 July | Longden Place | 3 | 9 | Trinity (16) | |
| 26 | 1970 | C. J. Fernando | S. P. Samarasekara | 4 July | Longden Place | 3 | 19 | Trinity (17) | |
| 26 | 1970 | C. J. Fernando | S. P. Samarasekara | 21 July | Nittawela | 12 | 16 | Trinity (17) | |
| 27 | 1971 | F. R. Perera | Y. S. Ping | 29 July | Longden Place | 22 | 3 | Royal (10) | |
| 27 | 1971 | F. R. Perera | Y. S. Ping | Second leg not played due to 1971 JVP insurrection | | | | Royal (10) | |
| 28 | 1972 | G. D. S. Gunasekara | A. E. Unantenne | 1 July | Longden Place | 9 | 8 | Trinity (18) | |
| 28 | 1972 | G. D. S. Gunasekara | A. E. Unantenne | 15 July | Nittawela | 3 | 10 | Trinity (18) | |
| 29 | 1973 | M. G. Muller | J. K. Yu | 9 July | Nittawela | 18 | 4 | Royal (11) | |
| 29 | 1973 | M. G. Muller | J. K. Yu | 21 July | Maitland Crescent | 4 | 12 | Royal (11) | |
| 30 | 1974 | M. B. Akbar | C. Y. Ching | 6 July | Longden Place | 3 | 18 | Trinity (19) | |
| 30 | 1974 | M. B. Akbar | C. Y. Ching | 20 July | Nittawela | 9 | 12 | Trinity (19) | |
| 31 | 1975 | H. A. I. Hassen | M. R. Sourjah | 12 July | Nittawela | 13 | 11 | Royal (12) | |
| 31 | 1975 | H. A. I. Hassen | M. R. Sourjah | 19 July | Longden Place | 21 | 3 | Royal (12) | |
| 32 | 1976 | M. Weerakumar | S. V. Ranasinghe | 3 July | Longden Place | 36 | 0 | Royal (13) | |
| 32 | 1976 | M. Weerakumar | S. V. Ranasinghe | 17 July | Bogambara | 25 | 6 | Royal (13) | |
| 33 | 1977 | S. S. Hashim | R. N. Balasuriya | 2 July | Bogambara | 6 | 12 | Trinity (20) | |
| 33 | 1977 | S. S. Hashim | R. N. Balasuriya | 16 July | Longden Place | 4 | 10 | Trinity (20) | |
| 34 | 1978 | K. R. T. Peiris | J. R. Kiridena | 3 July | Longden Place | 0 | 0 | Royal (14) | |
| 34 | 1978 | K. R. T. Peiris | J. R. Kiridena | 15 July | Bogambara | 8 | 4 | Royal (14) | |
| 35 | 1979 | R. P. Gunasekara | J. V. Tissera | 7 July | Bogambara | 3 | 4 | Royal (15) | |
| 35 | 1979 | R. P. Gunasekara | J. V. Tissera | 21 July | Longden Place | 18 | 0 | Royal (15) | |
| 36 | 1980 | S. Sujanthakumar | T. B. Ellepola | 5 July | Longden Place | 7 | 3 | Royal (16) | |
| 36 | 1980 | S. Sujanthakumar | T. B. Ellepola | 19 July | Nittawela | 16 | 3 | Royal (16) | |
| 37 | 1981 | N. S. Cooray | R. Bandaranayake | 4 July | Nittawela | 3 | 16 | Trinity (21) | |
| 37 | 1981 | N. S. Cooray | R. Bandaranayake | 18 July | Longden Place | 10 | 3 | Trinity (21) | |
| 38 | 1982 | H. Muttiah | B. S. J. Fernando | 3 July | Longden Place | 6 | 9 | Trinity (22) | |
| 38 | 1982 | H. Muttiah | B. S. J. Fernando | 17 July | Nittawela | 4 | 6 | Trinity (22) | |
| 39 | 1983 | S. Cooray | A. D. Ratwatte | 2 July | Bogambara | 6 | 14 | Trinity (23) | |
| 39 | 1983 | S. Cooray | A. D. Ratwatte | 16 July | Longden Place | 10 | 6 | Trinity (23) | |
| 40 | 1984 | S. Agalawatte | D. M. Wijesinghe | 7 July | Longden Place | 6 | 3 | Royal (17) | |
| 40 | 1984 | S. Agalawatte | D. M. Wijesinghe | 21 July | Bogambara | 0 | 0 | Royal (17) | |
| 41 | 1985 | C. Nanayakkara | M. Jayatissa | 6 July | Bogambara | 9 | 18 | Trinity (24) | |
| 41 | 1985 | C. Nanayakkara | M. Jayatissa | 20 July | Longden Place | 4 | 3 | Trinity (24) | |
| 42 | 1986 | M. J. Peiris | S. N. Gunaratne | 5 July | Longden Place | 3 | 6 | Trinity (25) | |
| 42 | 1986 | M. J. Peiris | S. N. Gunaratne | 19 July | Bogambara | 3 | 9 | Trinity (25) | |
| 43 | 1987 | H. A. S. Madanayake (1L); R. de Z. Gunarathne (2L) | T. Rajapakse | 2 July | Bogambara | 3 | 7 | Trinity (26) | |
| 43 | 1987 | H. A. S. Madanayake (1L); R. de Z. Gunarathne (2L) | T. Rajapakse | 18 July | Sugathadasa | 3 | 19 | Trinity (26) | |
| 44 | 1988 | L. W. de Z. Gunarathne | B. Dandeniya | 2 July | Sugathadasa | 24 | 0 | Royal (18) | |
| 44 | 1988 | L. W. de Z. Gunarathne | B. Dandeniya | 16 July | Bogambara | 13 | 0 | Royal (18) | |
| 45 | 1989 | J. H. A. Dhammika | R. Ranaraja | 5 August | Bogambara | 9 | 6 | Royal (19) | |
| 45 | 1989 | J. H. A. Dhammika | R. Ranaraja | 14 August | Sugathadasa | 9 | 8 | Royal (19) | |
| 46 | 1990 | R. Jayasuriya | W. D. S. Premaratne (1L); R. Kalpage (2L) | 6 July | Sugathadasa | 23 | 8 | Royal (20) | |
| 46 | 1990 | R. Jayasuriya | W. D. S. Premaratne (1L); R. Kalpage (2L) | 21 July | Bogambara | 0 | 6 | Royal (20) | |
| 47 | 1991 | M. Dahanayake | M. A. Deen | 6 July | Bogambara | 4 | 12 | Trinity (27) | |
| 47 | 1991 | M. Dahanayake | M. A. Deen | 20 July | Sugathadasa | 10 | 25 | Trinity (27) | |
| 48 | 1992 | H. Wijesinghe | H. M. Goonetileke | 4 July | Sugathadasa | 3 | 3 | Draw | |
| 48 | 1992 | H. Wijesinghe | H. M. Goonetileke | 19 July | Nittawela | 0 | 0 | Draw | |
| 49 | 1993 | C. R. A. Abeysuriya | N. Muhandiramge | 26 June | Nittawela | 3 | 0 | Royal (21) | |
| 49 | 1993 | C. R. A. Abeysuriya | N. Muhandiramge | 10 July | Sugathadasa | 10 | 3 | Royal (21) | |
| 50 | 1994 | R. Malalasekara | A. M. Rally | 18 June | Sugathadasa | 10 | 3 | Royal (22) | |
| 50 | 1994 | R. Malalasekara | A. M. Rally | 2 July | Nittawela | 8 | 8 | Royal (22) | |
| 51 | 1995 | A. Assen | M. A. H. Omar | 17 June | Nittawela | 3 | 6 | Trinity (28) | |
| 51 | 1995 | A. Assen | M. A. H. Omar | 1 July | Sugathadasa | 6 | 22 | Trinity (28) | |
| 52 | 1996 | R. Gunatilake | S. Amarasinghe | 22 June | Sugathadasa | 3 | 30 | Trinity (29) | |
| 52 | 1996 | R. Gunatilake | S. Amarasinghe | 6 July | Nittawela | 3 | 12 | Trinity (29) | |
| 53 | 1997 | A. Yusuf | N. S. Fernando | 21 June | TCRS | 6 | 14 | Trinity (30) | |
| 53 | 1997 | A. Yusuf | N. S. Fernando | 5 July | Sugathadasa | 18 | 11 | Trinity (30) | |
| 54 | 1998 | W. S. S. R. Perera | P. Jayawardena | 20 June | Sugathadasa | 18 | 20 | Royal (23) | |
| 54 | 1998 | W. S. S. R. Perera | P. Jayawardena | 4 July | Bogambara | 42 | 11 | Royal (23) | |
| 55 | 1999 | D. R. Rahim | R. Wickramasiri | 19 June | Bogambara | 10 | 19 | Trinity (31) | |
| 55 | 1999 | D. R. Rahim | R. Wickramasiri | 3 July | Sugathadasa | 7 | 13 | Trinity (31) | |
| 56 | 2000 | S. Perera | H. A. Luchow | 17 June | Sugathadasa | 25 | 32 | Trinity (32) | |
| 56 | 2000 | S. Perera | H. A. Luchow | 1 July | Bogambara | 20 | 17 | Trinity (32) | |
| 57 | 2001 | H. Kaluaratchi | T. Jayawardena | 23 June | Bogambara | 12 | 6 | Royal (24) | |
| 57 | 2001 | H. Kaluaratchi | T. Jayawardena | 7 July | Sugathadasa | 16 | 0 | Royal (24) | |
| 58 | 2002 | Z. Hamid | N. S. A. Mendis | 13 July | RCSC | 39 | 0 | Royal (25) | |
| 58 | 2002 | Z. Hamid | N. S. A. Mendis | 27 July | Bogambara | 44 | 0 | Royal (25) | |
| 59 | 2003 | R. Jayasundara | M. Maddumapatabendi | 19 July | Bogambara | 13 | 11 | Royal (26) | |
| 59 | 2003 | R. Jayasundara | M. Maddumapatabendi | 2 August | RCSC | 13 | 8 | Royal (26) | |
| 60 | 2004 | A. L. Dissanayake | D. Senarath | 7 August | RCSC | 41 | 6 | Royal (27) | |
| 60 | 2004 | A. L. Dissanayake | D. Senarath | 21 August | Bogambara | 10 | 0 | Royal (27) | |
| 61 | 2005 | V. Wijewardene | B. N. R. Fernando | 10 September | Bogambara | 6 | 36 | Trinity (33) | |
| 61 | 2005 | V. Wijewardene | B. N. R. Fernando | 24 September | RCSC | 7 | 33 | Trinity (33) | |
| 62 | 2006 | C. S. Gamage | I. Maddumapatabendi | 9 September | RCSC | 10 | 21 | Trinity (34) | |
| 62 | 2006 | C. S. Gamage | I. Maddumapatabendi | 23 September | Bogambara | 5 | 26 | Trinity (34) | |
| 63 | 2007 | M. Abeyratne | M. Wickramasiri (1L); S. Wanigasekara (2L) | 9 June | Bogambara | 20 | 12 | Royal (28) | |
| 63 | 2007 | M. Abeyratne | M. Wickramasiri (1L); S. Wanigasekara (2L) | 23 June | RCSC | 15 | 11 | Royal (28) | |
| 64 | 2008 | S. Lenaduwa | M. N. Gunawardena | 14 June | RCSC | 12 | 24 | Trinity (35) | |
| 64 | 2008 | S. Lenaduwa | M. N. Gunawardena | 28 June | TCRS | 8 | 0 | Trinity (35) | |
| 65 | 2009 | N. Dhason | V. Wijesinghe | 30 May | TCRS | 22 | 12 | Royal (29) | |
| 65 | 2009 | N. Dhason | V. Wijesinghe | 13 June | RCSC | 31 | 15 | Royal (29) | |
| 66 | 2010 | D. Attygalle | D. Dissanayake | 12 May | RCSC | 38 | 37 | Royal (30) | |
| 66 | 2010 | D. Attygalle | D. Dissanayake | 26 May | Bogambara | 34 | 17 | Royal (30) | |
| 67 | 2011 | S. Pathirana | M. Ramzeen | 28 May | Bogambara | 33 | 25 | Trinity (36) | |
| 67 | 2011 | S. Pathirana | M. Ramzeen | 11 June | RCSC | 5 | 40 | Trinity (36) | |
| 68 | 2012 | A. Jamaldeen | K. Seneviratne | 16 June | RCSC | 11 | 34 | Trinity (37) | |
| 68 | 2012 | A. Jamaldeen | K. Seneviratne | 30 June | TCRS | 20 | 36 | Trinity (37) | |
| 69 | 2013 | R. Jamaldeen | S. Singalaxana (1L); H. Wadood (2L) | 1 June | TCRS | 25 | 37 | Trinity (38) | |
| 69 | 2013 | R. Jamaldeen | S. Singalaxana (1L); H. Wadood (2L) | 15 June | RCSC | 13 | 9 | Trinity (38) | |
| 70 | 2014 | N. Jayawardena | T. Ratwatte | 10 May | RCSC | 16 | 28 | Trinity (39) | |
| 70 | 2014 | N. Jayawardena | T. Ratwatte | 24 May | TCRS | 18 | 19 | Trinity (39) | |
| 71 | 2015 | B. Gamage | I. Rangala | 9 May | TCRS | 23 | 22 | Royal (31) | |
| 71 | 2015 | B. Gamage | I. Rangala | 24 May | RCSC | 49 | 0 | Royal (31) | |
| 72 | 2016 | N. Gunadheera | R. Karunanayake | 30 April | RCSC | 22 | 17 | Draw (2) | |
| 72 | 2016 | N. Gunadheera | R. Karunanayake | 14 May | TCRS | 13 | 18 | Draw (2) | |
| 73 | 2017 | O. Askey | N. Yee | 20 May | TCRS | 22 | 17 | Royal (32) | |
| 73 | 2017 | O. Askey | N. Yee | 3 June | RCSC | 13 | 8 | Royal (32) | |
| 74 | 2018 | S. Feroze | A. Shiek | 21 April | RCSC | 39 | 7 | Royal (33) | |
| 74 | 2018 | S. Feroze | A. Shiek | 5 May | TCRS | 27 | 19 | Royal (33) | |
| 75 | 2019 | T. Hassen | R. Bandaranayake | 1 June | TCRS | 34 | 17 | Royal (34) | |
| 75 | 2019 | T. Hassen | R. Bandaranayake | 15 June | RCSC | 13 | 24 | Royal (34) | |
| – | 2020 | Not played due to COVID-19 pandemic | | – | | | | – | – |
| – | 2020 | Not played due to COVID-19 pandemic | | – | | | | – | – |
| – | 2021 | Not played due to COVID-19 pandemic | | – | | | | – | – |
| – | 2021 | Not played due to COVID-19 pandemic | | – | | | | – | – |
| 76 | 2022 | H. Peiris | L. Moragoda | 20 August | RCSC | 29 | 0 | Royal (35) | |
| 76 | 2022 | H. Peiris | L. Moragoda | 3 September | TCRS | 21 | 26 | Royal (35) | |
| 77 | 2023 | R. Senanayake | A. Manzil | 22 July | TCRS | 10 | 13 | Royal (36) | |
| 77 | 2023 | R. Senanayake | A. Manzil | 5 August | RCSC | 27 | 17 | Royal (36) | |
| 78 | 2024 | T. Perera | T. Dissanayaka (Note: The regular team captain, A. Kodithuwakku, was sidelined due to injury. Trinity was led by the vice-captain.) | 24 August | RCSC | 16 | 17 | Trinity (40) | |
| 78 | 2024 | T. Perera | T. Dissanayaka | 7 September | TCRS | 23 | 25 | Trinity (40) | |
| 79 | 2025 | A. Samarasinghe | M. U. Shafraz | 23 August | TCRS | 15 | 5 | Royal (37) | |
| 79 | 2025 | A. Samarasinghe | M. U. Shafraz | 6 September | RCSC | 3 | 8 | Royal (37) | |
| 80 | 2026 | D. Pathirana | S. Althaf | 11 July | RCSC | 10 | 33 | Trinity (41) | |
| 80 | 2026 | D. Pathirana | S. Althaf | 25 July | TCRS | 10 | 39 | Trinity (41) | |

== Other competitions: 1987–present ==
=== Statistics ===
As of match played 13 June 2026

Match statistics
| Venue | Played | Won by | | Drawn | Total points | |
| Venue | Played | Royal | Trinity | Drawn | Royal | Trinity |
|---|---|---|---|---|---|---|
| Colombo | 7 | 2 | 5 | – | 125 | 194 |
| Kandy | 1 | – | 1 | – | 12 | 34 |
| Overall | 8 | 2 | 6 | – | 137 | 228 |

=== Results of the last match ===
2026 Dialog Schools Rugby League – Round 2, Game week 2

13 June 2026
16:15 SLST

| Royal | 15–48 | Trinity |
| Try: O. Mudunkotuwa 56' c K. Ekanayake 70' m Con: S. Shafeek (1/2) 56'; Pen: S. Shafeek (1/1) 21'; Cards: (yellow card) 34' | Report | Try: N. Jayah 10' m S. Weerawansa 15' c M. Yaddehige (2) 27' c, 37' c A. Malik 35' c A. Fernando 48' c D. Ambepitiya 52' m Con: S. Althaf (5/7) 15', 27', 35', 37', 48'; Pen: S. Althaf (1/1) 8'; Cards: S. Weerawansa (yellow card) 32'; E. Jayasena (yellow card) 61'; K. Weerakoon (yellow card) 65' |

Royal College Sports Complex, Colombo
Referee: K. Sandaruwan (SLR)

=== Results ===
As of match played 13 June 2026

Results: 1987–present
| Year | Tournament | Captains | | Date | Venue | Score | | Winner | Ref. |
| Year | Tournament | Royal | Trinity | Date | Venue | Royal | Trinity | Winner | Ref. |
|---|---|---|---|---|---|---|---|---|---|
| 1987 | R. Premadasa Trophy; Quarter-final | H. A. S. Madanayake | T. Rajapakse | 30 August | Sugathadasa | 6 | 10 | Trinity | |
| 1993 | R. Premadasa Trophy; Quarter-final | C. R. A. Abeysuriya | N. Muhandiramge | 6 September | Sugathadasa | 6 | 9 | Trinity | |
| 2014 | Milo President's Trophy; Semi-final | N. Jayawardena | T. Ratwatte | 3 July | RCSC | 30 | 29 | Royal | |
| 2022 | Dialog Schools Rugby League; Round 1, Game week 3 | H. Peiris | L. Moragoda | 8 July | RCSC | 20 | 21 | Trinity | |
| 2024 | Dialog Schools Rugby League; Round 2, Game week 2 | T. Perera | T. Dissanayaka | 17 August | Sugathadasa | 22 | 19 | Royal | |
| 2025 | Dialog Schools Rugby League; Round 1, Game week 5 | A. Samarasinghe | M. U. Shafraz | 5 July | TCRS | 12 | 34 | Trinity | |
| 2026 | Milo President's Trophy; Final | D. Pathirana | S. Althaf | 4 April | Sugathadasa | 26 | 58 | Trinity | |
| 2026 | Dialog Schools Rugby League; Round 2, Game week 2 | D. Pathirana | S. Althaf | 13 June | RCSC | 15 | 48 | Trinity | |

== Overall record: 1920–present ==
As of match played 25 July 2026

Match statistics
| Tournament | Span | Played | Won by | | Drawn | Total points | |
| Tournament | Span | Played | Royal | Trinity | Drawn | Royal | Trinity |
|---|---|---|---|---|---|---|---|
| Inter-school | 1920–1944 | 22 | 3 | 19 | – | 53 | 410 |
| Bradby Shield | 1945–present | 159 | 73 | 75 | 11 | 1,749 | 1,661 |
| Other competitions | 1987–present | 8 | 2 | 6 | – | 137 | 228 |
| Overall | 1920–present | 189 | 78 | 100 | 11 | 1,939 | 2,299 |

== Match and series records ==
As of match played 25 July 2026

Records: 1945–present
| Record | Royal | Trinity | Ref. |
|---|---|---|---|
| Winning the encounter after losing the first leg | 3 (1979, 1998 and 2023) | 5 (1945, 1946, 1962, 1972 and 2011) | |
| Winning the encounter after drawing the first leg | 1 (1978) | 2 (1963 and 1966) | |
| The biggest comeback win | 2-point deficit in 1998; won the second leg 42–11 and the encounter by 29 points.; 3-point deficit in 2023; won second leg 27–17 and the encounter by 7 points. | 8-point deficit in 2011; won the second leg 40–5 and the encounter by 27 points. | |
| Longest winning streak | 5 (between 2017 and 2023) | 6 (1952–1957): The longest winning streak in the series. | |
| The highest aggregate score by a team in an encounter | 83 points in 2002.: The record for the highest aggregate score by a team in the series over two legs. | 72 points in 2026. | |
| The highest margin of victory in an encounter | 83 points (83–0) in 2002.: The highest recorded victory margin in the series over two legs. | 56 points (69–13) in 2005. | |
| The record for the highest score achieved by a team in a single match | 49 points in 2015 second leg.: The highest recorded in a single match. | 40 points in 2011 second leg. | |
| The highest aggregate score achieved by both teams in a single match | 75 points in 2010 first leg, with Royal winning 38–37. | | |
| The highest aggregate score achieved by both teams in an encounter | 126 points in 2010, with Royal winning 72–54. | | |
| Drawn encounters | 2 (1992 and 2016): In 1992, the Bradby encounter ended in a draw as both legs concluded with scores of 3–3 in the first leg and 0–0 in the second leg. This marked the first time such an outcome had occurred in Bradby history.; In 2016, Royal won the first leg 22–17, while Trinity won the second leg 18–13. The encounter ended in a draw, with both teams scoring 35 points each. | | |

== Notable moments in Bradby Shield history ==
=== 1970s and 1980s ===
==== 1971 ====
- Due to security concerns stemming from the 1971 JVP Insurrection, only the first leg of the 27th encounter was staged between the schools. The Shield was awarded to Royal College as a result of the first leg at an assembly by E. L. Fernando, the then-principal of Trinity College.

==== 1983 ====
- E. L. Bradby, former principal of Royal College, and his wife travelled to Sri Lanka as guests of the Royal College Union for the second leg of the 39th encounter.

==== 1987 ====
- J. R. Jayewardene, the President of Sri Lanka at the time, attended the second leg of the 43rd encounter as the chief guest. He had previously captained the Royal College team in 1924 against Trinity College, where they lost 3–37.

=== 2010s ===
==== 2013 ====
- Sir Graham Henry, former head coach of the All Blacks and winning coach of the 2011 Rugby World Cup, attended as the guest of honour for the first leg of the 69th encounter, held on 1 June 2013 at the Trinity College Rugby Stadium. The match was officiated by Jonathan Kaplan, a renowned international rugby union referee with four Rugby World Cup appearances to his credit.

To cap the journey I refereed the annual Bradby Shield Encounter between Trinity College and Royal College in the beautiful mountain city of Kandy. The crowd of 14 000 included none other than Graham Henry, the guest of honour, and former pupils from around the world who converged on Kandy for the match. It was an experience that, for me, ranks right up there with the best schoolboy fixtures anywhere in the world.

— Jonathan Kaplan, Call It Like It Is: The Jonathan Kaplan Story (2014)

==== 2019 ====
- The 2019 encounter marked the 75th anniversary of the series. The matches were postponed numerous times in the aftermath of the 2019 Sri Lanka Easter bombings and was played under heightened security.
- The first leg of the 75th encounter was officiated by Aaqil Jamaldeen, who captained the Royal College 1st XV rugby team in 2012. His father, Nizam Jamaldeen, had previously officiated the encounter in 2001. They are the only father and son to have refereed in Bradby Shield encounters.

=== 2020s ===
==== 2020 and 2021 ====
- Due to the COVID-19 pandemic, the series was suspended in 2020 and 2021, marking the first time in its history that the Bradby series was totally halted.

==== 2024 ====
- The first and second legs of the 78th encounter, held on 24 August and 7 September 2024 respectively, were officiated by United Arab Emirates Rugby Federation referees Jaco de Wit and Brayden Hudson.

==== 2025 ====
- Trinity College won the 2025 Dialog Schools Rugby League on 2 August 2025, securing the domestic inter-school rugby title with one game remaining. This marked the first time in the history of the series that one of the two teams entered the annual encounter as the reigning inter-school rugby champions of the country.
- David Jacobus Brouwer, from the Bay of Plenty Rugby Union (BOPRU) in New Zealand, officiated both legs of the 79th encounter.

==== 2026 ====
- Trinity College won the 2026 President's Trophy inter-school knockout rugby tournament, defeating Royal College 58–26 in the final held at Sugathadasa Stadium on 4 April 2026. It was also the first time the two schools had met in a knockout tournament final and the highest score recorded in a match between them.
- Trinity College won the 2026 Dialog Schools Rugby League on 27 June 2026, remaining undefeated throughout the season, retaining the title from the previous year, and completing the domestic double for 2026. This will be the first time in the history of the series that either team enters the annual encounter having secured the domestic double for the season.
- For the first time in the history of the series, Royal College and Trinity College met four times during the 2026 season. All four matches, the knockout trophy final, the league match and the two legs of the Bradby encounter were won by Trinity College 58–26, 48–15, 33–10 and 39–10.
- The first and second legs of the 80th encounter were officiated by Japan Rugby Football Union referees Meitetsu Shimizu and Yusaku Murata respectively.

== Community engagement programmes ==
=== The souvenir ===
Since 1977, the Royal College Interact Club has published the Bradby Souvenir to commemorate the encounter's Colombo leg.

=== Bradby express ===
The Bradby express was the name given to the regular Intercity Express train service offered by the Sri Lanka Railways that was packed with students and old boys from both schools on their way to the Kandy leg of the encounter – hence the name Bradby Express. It started off in the 1950s and was held yearly until the mid-1980s, when it was halted due to security concerns resulting from the intensification of the Sri Lankan civil war and the 1987–1989 JVP insurrection.

Since the end of the conflict, a chartered train dubbed as The Bradby express has served this role, transporting Royal supporters to and from Kandy for the event.

=== Bradby golf ===
Former Royal and Trinity students compete for the G. C. Wickremesinghe Challenge Trophy, a golf tournament hosted at the Victoria Golf and Country Resort since 2016 before the Kandy leg of the Bradby Shield encounter.

== See also ==
- Rugby union in Sri Lanka

== Notes ==
Sources

- "Centenary Number, Trinity College, Kandy, 1872–1972" (PDF). noolaham.net. 17 March 1972. Archived from the original (PDF) on 8 August 2024.
- Perera, S. S. (June 1994). Royal vs Trinity – 50 Years of Bradby Shield 1945–1994. Bradby Shield Encounter Organising Committee.
- Behind the Shield – the history, the heroes, the hearts of 75 years 1945–2019. Bradby Shield Encounter Organising Committee. June 2019.
- "The Trinity Story 1872–2022". history.trinitycollege.lk. 12 February 2024. Archived from the original on 13 May 2025.
