= Rajan Kadirgamar =

Rajan Kadirgamar MVO
- Born: 1922
- Died: 2002 (aged 79–80)
- Military career
- Allegiance: Sri Lanka
- Branch: Royal Ceylon Navy (1950–1970); Royal Ceylon Volunteer Naval Force (1941–1950)
- Service years: 1941–1970
- Rank: Rear Admiral
- Commands: Captain of the Royal Ceylon Navy
- Conflicts: World War II
- Awards: Member of the Royal Victorian Order; Burma Star

Rear Admiral Rajanathan Kadirgamar, MVO (born 1922, date of death unknown) was a Ceylonese flag officer. He was the second Ceylonese Captain of the Royal Ceylon Navy from 1960 to 1970 and as such the longest serving Commander of the Navy.

Kadirgamar died prior to 2002.

== Early life and education ==
Born to a Tamil Protestant Vellala family with deep roots in Jaffna, his father was Samuel J.C.Kadirgamar Sr, JP, UM a Proctor, who was the President of the Colombo Proctor's Association and the founder President of the Law Society of Ceylon and Edith Rosemand Parimalam Mather. He had four siblings, his elder brother S.J.C.Kadirgamar Jr., QC became an eminent lawyer; his younger brothers were Major Selvanathan "Bai" Kadirgamar, who served as the Deputy Assistant Quartermaster-General (DAQMG) of the Ceylon Army; Thirumalan "Mana" Kadirgamar a planter who died in a motor accident very young and the youngest was Lakshman Kadirgamar, PC, who became the Minister of Foreign Affairs. Kadirgamar was educated at Royal College, Colombo, where he was the senior sergeant of the cadet contingent and played rugby in the annual Bradby Shield Encounter.

== Naval career ==
=== Ceylon Naval Volunteer Force ===
With the outbreak of World War II, Kadirgamar joined the Ceylon Naval Volunteer Force as a cadet officer. He completed his officer training winning the Sword of Honour as top of his batch at the passing out parade at Trincomalee, in 1941. He was thereafter commissioned as a probationary sub lieutenant in the Ceylon Royal Naval Volunteer Reserve (CRNVR) on 1 January 1942 and was attached to the Royal Navy for the duration of the war. During war he served on board ships of the Eastern Fleet and saw action off the coast of Burma. Following the general demobilization at the end of the war Kadirgamar, who was now a lieutenant, remained in the CRNVR and in 1946 led the CRNVR's contingent in the victory parade in London. In 1949, he was promoted to the rank of lieutenant commander.

=== Royal Ceylon Navy ===
With the formation of the Royal Ceylon Navy in 1950, he switched to a regular commissioned with the rank of lieutenant commander. In 1951, he was appointed commanding officer of HMCyS Vijaya, the first ship of the new navy, which became its flagship. He also served as extra aide-de-camp to the Governor-Generals Lord Soulbury and Sir Oliver Goonetilleke. Taking successive commands at sea and in shore establishments of the now growing navy, he served as Staff Officer Plans at naval headquarters. Promoted to commander in 1955, he served as Commander Northern Area and Commanding Officer, HMCyS Elara; Chief of Staff and was promoted to the rank of captain in 1959.

=== Captain of the Navy ===
In 1960, he was made acting Captain of the Navy with promotion to the rank of temporary commodore, when Rear Admiral Royce de Mel was relieved of command following an inquiry into officers smuggling contraband. When a coup d'état was attempted in 1962, which included de Mel, Kadirgamar was targeted by the coup and was planned to be held under house arrest. The coup failed and its leaders arrested shortly. Even though his brother was a defense counsel for the coup leaders in the long trial that followed, Kadirgamar remained head of the navy, when other service commanders were quickly changed. In 1964 his appointment was confirmed and he served as Captain of the Navy until his retirement in 1970 with the rank of rear admiral. Even though funding was cut and recruitment halted in the navy by the government, he established the Naval and Maritime Academy in Trincomalee. He was a working director at Port Cargo Corporation and played a major role in establishing the Ceylon Shipping Corporation.

== Honors ==
Kadirgamar was appointed a Member of the Royal Victorian Order (MVO) by Queen Elizabeth II in 1954. He had been awarded the 1939–1945 Star, the Burma Star and the War Medal 1939–1945 for war service from 1939 to 1945. For service in the Royal Ceylon Navy, he received the service medals Ceylon Armed Services Long Service Medal, Ceylon Armed Services Inauguration Medal and the Queen Elizabeth II Coronation Medal.

== See also ==
- Lakshman Kadirgamar

Military offices
| Preceded by Royce de Mel | Captain of the Royal Ceylon Navy; 1960–1970 | Succeeded by D. V. Hunter |
