= Sam Kadirgamar =

Sri Lankan lawyer

Sam J. C. Kadirgamar Jr., QC was an eminent Sri Lankan lawyer.

Kadiragamar came from a Tamil Protestant Vellala family with deep roots in Jaffna, his father was Samuel J.C.Kadirgamar Sr, JP, UM a Proctor, who was the President of the Colombo Proctor's Association and the founder President of the Law Society of Ceylon. He was the oldest in a family of five brothers. His brothers where Rear Admiral Rajan Kadiragamar, former Captain of the Royal Ceylon Navy; Major Selvanathan "Bai" Kadirgamar of the Ceylon Army, Thirumalan "Mana" Kadirgamar, and the youngest Lakshman Kadirgamar, PC former Minister of Foreign Affairs.

Educated at Royal College Colombo, where he played rugby in the annual Bradby Shield Encounter and at Ceylon Law College.

He gained prominence as a lawyer being appointed as a Queen's Counsel and was part of the defense team of the accused of the coup d'étata was attempted in 1962.

He was a member of the Ceylon Rifle Association.
