= 2021 Currie Cup First Division =

Rugby union competition

- Countries: South Africa
- Date: 18 June – 13 August
- Champions: Leopards (2nd title)
- Runners-up: Griffons
- Matches played: 24
- Attendance: 0 (average 0 per match)
- Tries scored: 183 (average 7.6 per match)
- Top point scorer: Anrich Richter (Valke, 70)
- Top try scorer: Dylan Maart (Boland Cavaliers, 8)

The 2021 Currie Cup First Division was the 83rd edition of the Currie Cup. As the second-tier of the competition, it ran alongside the 2021 Currie Cup Premier Division. It was sponsored by beer brand Carling Black Label and organised by the South African Rugby Union.

The First Division was cancelled in 2020 due to the COVID-19 pandemic. As such, the 2021 season was the first time any of the First Division teams had played competitively since the 2019 edition of the tournament, barring the Eastern Province Elephants who participated in the 2021 Preparation series. The Jaguares XV, who took part and won the 2019 Currie Cup First Division, did not take part in the 2021 edition of the tournament.

== Teams ==
Location of teams in the 2021 Currie Cup First Division

The seven competing teams were:

2021 Currie Cup First Division
Team	Sponsored name
Boland Cavaliers	Boland Kavaliers
Border Bulldogs	Border Bulldogs
Eastern Province Elephants	Eastern Province Elephants
Griffons	Down Touch Griffons
Leopards	Leopards
SWD Eagles	SWD Eagles
Valke	Valke

== Regular season ==
=== Standings ===
2021 Currie Cup First Division standings
Pos	Team	Pld	W	D	L	PF	PA	PD	TF	TA	TB	LB	Pts	Qualification
1	Leopards	6	4	1	1	205	127	+78	31	18	5	1	26 (Note: Cancelled fixture: Match declared a draw, Leopards awarded four match points.)	semifinals
2	Griffons	6	4	1	1	178	74	+104	26	9	5	0	25 (Note: Cancelled fixture: Match declared a draw, Griffons awarded four match points.)	semifinals
3	Valke	6	3	0	3	198	184	+14	27	24	4	2	18	semifinals
4	Boland Cavaliers	6	3	0	3	165	181	−16	23	23	3	1	16	semifinals
5	Eastern Province Elephants	6	2	0	4	130	200	−70	17	29	3	0	11	
6	Border Bulldogs	6	2	0	4	154	234	−80	19	36	3	0	11	
7	SWD Eagles	6	1	2	3	107	137	−30	16	20	1	1	6	

Source: springboks.rugby
Rules for classification: Tournament points in the standings were awarded to teams as follows:
- 4 points for a win.
- 2 points for a draw.
- 1 bonus point for a loss in a match by seven points or under.
- 1 bonus point for scoring four tries or more.
Teams were ranked in the standings firstly by tournament points then by: (a) points difference from all matches (points scored less points conceded); (b) tries difference from all matches (tries scored less tries conceded); (c) points difference from the matches between the tied teams; (d) points scored in all matches; (e) tries scored in all matches; and, if needed, (f) a coin toss.

=== Round-by-round ===
The table below shows the progression of all teams throughout the Currie Cup season. Each team's tournament points on the standings log is shown for each round, with the overall log position in brackets.

2020–21 Currie Cup team progression
Team	R1	R2	R3	R4	R5	R6	R7	Semi	Final
Boland Cavaliers	0 (5th)	5 (4th)	5 (5th)	10 (3rd)	15 (3rd)	16 (3rd)	16 (4th)	Lost	DNQ
Border Bulldogs	0 (6th)	0 (7th)	0 (7th)	5 (6th)	6 (6th)	11 (5th)	11 (6th)	DNQ	DNQ
Eastern Province Elephants	1 (4th)	1 (5th)	6 (4th)	6 (5th)	6 (7th)	11 (6th)	11 (5th)	DNQ	DNQ
Griffons	5 (3rd)	10 (1st)	14 (1st)	19 (1st)	20 (1st)	20 (2nd)	25 (2nd)	Won	Lost
Leopards	5 (2nd)	9 (2nd)	11 (2nd)	11 (2nd)	16 (2nd)	21 (1st)	26 (1st)	Won	Won
SWD Eagles	0 (7th)	0 (6th)	0 (6th)	1 (7th)	6 (5th)	6 (7th)	6 (7th)	DNQ	DNQ
Valke	5 (1st)	5 (3rd)	10 (3rd)	10 (4th)	12 (4th)	13 (4th)	18 (3rd)	Lost	DNQ
Key:	Win	Draw	Loss	No match	Bye				

=== Matches ===
The following matches were played in the round-robin stage of the 2021 Currie Cup First Division.

==== Round 1 ====
18 June 2021	SWD Eagles	17–50	Valke	Outeniqua Park, George
17:00				Attendance: Behind closed doors Referee: Ruhan Meiring

19 June 2021	Border Bulldogs	18–35	Griffons	Police Park, East London
14:00				Attendance: Behind closed doors Referee: Paul Mente

19 June 2021	Eastern Province Elephants	29–50	Leopards	Wolfson Stadium, KwaZakele
15:00				Attendance: Behind closed doors Referee: Griffin Colby

Bye/s: Boland Cavaliers

==== Round 2 ====
26 June 2021	Boland Cavaliers	46–19	Border Bulldogs	Boland Stadium, Wellington
14:00				Attendance: Behind closed doors Referee: Aimee Barrett-Theron

26 June 2021	Griffons	41–3	Eastern Province Elephants	HT Pelatona Projects Stadium, Welkom
15:00				Attendance: Behind closed doors Referee: Rasta Rasivhenge

26 June 2021	Leopards	0–0 (Note: The match between the Leopards and SWD Eagles was cancelled after players from the SWD Eagles returned positive tests for COVID-19 during the week before the game. The match was declared a draw, with the Leopards awarded 4 points on the standings log.)	SWD Eagles	Olën Park, Potchefstroom
15:00

Bye/s: Valke

==== Round 3 ====
2 July 2021	Valke	36–34	Leopards	Bosman Stadium, Brakpan
15:00				Attendance: Behind closed doors Referee: Morné Ferreira

2 July 2021	SWD Eagles	0–0 (Note: The match between the SWD Eagles and Griffons was cancelled after players from the SWD Eagles returned positive tests for COVID-19 during the week before the game. The match was declared a draw, with the Griffons awarded 4 points on the standings log.)	Griffons	Outeniqua Park, George
17:00

3 July 2021	Eastern Province Elephants	25–10	Boland Cavaliers	WJ de Wet Stadium, Despatch
15:00				Attendance: Behind closed doors Referee: Ruhan Meiring

Bye/s: Border Bulldogs

==== Round 4 ====
10 July 2021	Boland Cavaliers	28–21	SWD Eagles	Boland Stadium, Wellington
13:00				Attendance: Behind closed doors Referee: Griffin Colby

10 July 2021	Griffons	32–3	Valke	HT Pelatona Projects Stadium, Welkom
14:00				Attendance: Behind closed doors Referee: Ruhan Meiring

10 July 2021	Border Bulldogs	41–20	Eastern Province Elephants	Police Park, East London
14:00				Attendance: Behind closed doors Referee: Paul Mente

Bye/s: Leopards

==== Round 5 ====
16 July 2021	Valke	43–44	Boland Cavaliers	Bosman Stadium, Brakpan
13:30				Attendance: Behind closed doors Referee: Paul Mente

16 July 2021	SWD Eagles	50–29	Border Bulldogs	Outeniqua Park, George
17:00				Attendance: Behind closed doors Referee: Morné Ferreira

17 July 2021	Leopards	36–26	Griffons	Olën Park, Potchefstroom
15:00				Attendance: Behind closed doors Referee: Stephan Geldenhuys

Bye/s: Eastern Province Elephants

==== Round 6 ====
23 July 2021	Border Bulldogs	34–27	Valke	Police Park, East London
14:00				Attendance: Behind closed doors Referee: Phumzilo Mbewu

23 July 2021	Eastern Province Elephants	28–19	SWD Eagles	Wolfson Stadium, KwaZakele
15:00				Attendance: Behind closed doors Referee: Rasta Rasivhenge

24 July 2021	Boland Cavaliers	23–29	Leopards	Boland Stadium, Wellington
14:00				Attendance: Behind closed doors Referee: Divan Uys

Bye/s: Griffons

==== Round 7 ====
30 July 2021	Valke	39–23	Eastern Province Elephants	Bosman Stadium, Brakpan
13:00				Attendance: Behind closed doors Referee: Rasta Rasivhenge

31 July 2021	Leopards	56–13	Border Bulldogs	Olën Park, Potchefstroom
13:00				Attendance: Behind closed doors Referee: Ruhan Meiring

31 July 2021	Griffons	44–14	Boland Cavaliers	HT Pelatona Projects Stadium, Welkom
15:00				Attendance: Behind closed doors Referee: Morné Ferreira

Bye/s: SWD Eagles

== Play-offs ==
=== Semifinals ===
6 August 2021	Leopards	52–29	Boland Cavaliers	Olën Park, Potchefstroom
16:45				Attendance: Behind closed doors Referee: Paul Mente

7 August 2021	Griffons	38–31	Valke	HT Pelatona Projects Stadium, Welkom
11:30				Attendance: Behind closed doors Referee: Morné Ferreira

=== Final ===
13 August 2021	Leopards	19–18	Griffons	Olën Park, Potchefstroom
16:30	Try: Hoffman 24' c Genis 32' c Leibrandt 55' m Con: Visagie (2/3) 25', 33'; Cards: Fouché (yellow card) 60' to 69'	Report	Try: Matthys 57' m Mkhafu 63' c Con: Juries (1/2) 64'; Pen: Juries (2/3) 20', 35'; Cards: A. Williams (red card) 46'; Smit (yellow card) 31' to 41'	Attendance: Behind closed doors Referee: Rasta Rasivhenge

== Players ==
The respective team squads for the 2021 Currie Cup First Division were:

Boland Cavaliers squad
Forwards
- Robin Adams
- Bomba Bakeni
- Emile Booysen
- Taine Booysen
- Charl Castleman
- Nicholas Duhwa
- Albert du Plessis
- Jacobus du Plessis
- Wynand du Plessis
- Kelvin Fikster
- Ameer Hendricks
- Kayden Kiewit
- Che Klaasen
- Dian Koen
- Wayrin Losper
- Godwin Mangenje
- Thurlow Marsh
- Damian May
- Keenan Opperman
- Angelo Rossouw
- Bulelani Sali
- Marlyn Williams
Backs
- Deon Carstens
- Curtley Cedras
- Lucian Cupido
- Jovelian de Koker
- Lincolin Eksteen
- Wilneth Engelbrecht
- Michaine Fick
- Bjorkan Hendricks
- Niven Langdown
- John Lourens
- Dylan Maart
- Cleve Malgas
- Andre Manuel
- Garrick Mattheus
- Taigh Schoor
- Lubelo Scott
- Gavern Skippers
- Charlton Stevens
- Gerrit van Wyk
- Andries Viljoen
Coach
- Randall Modiba

Border Bulldogs squad
Forwards
- Siyanda Am
- Mkhonto Caku-Caku
- Ntsikomzi Daka
- Onke Dubase
- Billy Dutton
- Xolani Jacobs
- Asekho Marubelela
- Vuyisani Mavuso
- Siba Mnkani
- Yamkela Mzozoyana
- Masonwabe Ngcem
- Miyelani Ngobeni
- Ayabonga Nomboyo
- Lwando Nteta
- Thabo Ntunja
- Edwin Nxumalo
- Hlomla Payi
- Yakha Qinela
Backs
- Lutho Adonis
- Migcobo Bovu
- Jeandre Christian
- Lelethu Gcilitshana
- Lungelo Gosa
- Bangi Kobese
- Somila Mamtyoyi
- Lwandile Mapuko
- Vuyo Mbotho
- Sonwabiso Mqalo
- Litha Nkula
- Mihlali Nobomvu
- Sipho Nofemele
- Foxy Ntleki
- Anathi Shenxane
- Sicelo Tole
- Siphelele Zono
- Anele Zweni
Coach
- Tiger Mangweni

Eastern Province Elephants squad
Forwards
- Zingisa April
- Thembiso Befile
- Temba Boltina
- Mncedisi Dlwengu
- Duan du Plessis
- Ntsika Fisanti
- Cebo Gidane
- Gerrit Huisamen
- Hannes Huisamen
- Athenkosi Khethani
- Arnold Kleyn
- Mbeko Kota
- Lyle Lombard
- Anele Lungisa
- Rob Lyons
- Marzuq Maarman
- Athi Manentsa
- Lumko Mbane
- Lupumlo Mguca
- Giant Mtyanda
- Siya Nzuzo
- Bevin Prinsloo
- Ronald Scheckle
- Delare Schoeman
- Robin Stevens
- Luigy van Jaarsveld
- CJ Velleman
- Ashley Viviers
- Diego Williams
Backs
- Josh Allderman
- Riaan Arendse
- Karlo Aspeling
- Luvo Claasen
- Curtley Deysel
- Richman Gora
- Lennox Holster
- Ethan Jantjies
- Dylan Le Roux
- Lwandile Menze
- Siya Moabi
- Dayle Nel
- Odwa Ntlokwana
- Qeutyne Oerson
- Xolela Payi
- Keegan Schaefer
- Keagan September
- Sherwin Slater
- Davian Swanepoel
- Sacha Toring
- Wian van der Sandt
- Chevandré van Schoor
Coach
- Peter de Villiers

Griffons squad
Forwards
- Anrich Alberts
- Michael Benadie
- Christo Bezuidenhout
- Doctor Booysen
- Kenan Cronjé
- Stephan de Jager
- Dandré Delport
- Hannes Janse van Rensburg
- Thato Mavundla
- Khwezi Mkhafu
- Neo Mohapi
- Bandisa Ndlovu
- Japie Nel
- Wikus Nieuwenhuis
- Wandre Nortje
- Jean Pretorius
- Lindokuhle Welemu
- Ludio Williams
- Soso Xakalashi
Backs
- Gaza Davids
- Noegh Hayward
- Morné Joubert
- Jaywinn Juries
- Cornel Korff
- Bolla Matthys
- Athi Mayinje
- Duan Pretorius
- Domenic Smit
- Neil Stannard
- Aphiwe Stemele
- Duncan van Vuuren
- Gurshin Wehr
- Arthur Williams
- Charles Williams
- Ethan Williams
Coach
- Jacques Juries

Leopards squad
Forwards
- Heinz Bertram
- Reuben du Plessis
- Gustav du Rand
- Andries Fouché
- Rocky Groenewald
- Robey Leibrandt
- Senzo Mabuza
- JP Mans
- Victor Maruping
- Vincent Maruping
- Riaan May
- Siya Mdaka
- Komape Moloto
- Phil Mpofu
- Keanu Prinsloo
- Johan Retief
- Edmund Rheeder
- Hanno Snyman
- HP Swart
- Sampie Swiegers
- Nelius Theron
- Joe van der Hoogt
- George van der Westhuizen
- Chris Vermaak
Backs
- Tjaart Benadie
- Shirwin Cupido
- Lincoln Daniels
- Willem du Plessis
- Bernu Engelbrecht
- Keagan Fortune
- Riaan Genis
- Andre Grobler
- Eugene Hare
- Sylvester Hassien
- Duren Hoffman
- Allistair Mumba
- Charl Pretorius
- Hardus Pretorius
- Andries Truter
- Dean Stokes
- Chuiner van Rooyen
- Danrich Visagie
- Warren Williams
Coach
- André Pretorius

SWD Eagles squad
Forwards
- Pieter Ferreira
- Keanu Hendricks
- Duke Jantjies
- Francois Kemp
- Lehan Kiewit
- Stephen Leonard
- Heinrich Leukes
- Dean Malherbe
- Nkosikhona Masuku
- Nkosi Nofuma
- Anvor Prins
- Denver Prins
- Heinrich Roelfse
- Terrance Siyaya
- Deon Slabbert
- Marquin Smart
- Ian Thompson
- Jordan van Dyk
- Armando Wienand
Backs
- Shane Ball
- Truimph Baloyi
- Carlton Coeries
- JP Duvenhage
- Darryn Fortuin
- Tiaan Fourie
- Kirsten Heyns
- Eldrid James
- Adri Jacobs
- Luciano Jones
- Winslin Klaasen
- Lazner Nxele
- Ralton October
- Jason Olivier
- Earl Rouls
- Marquit September
- Sergio Stalmeester
- Ruan van Rensburg
Coach
- Eddie Myners

Valke squad
Forwards
- Herman Agenbag
- Jacques Alberts
- Tango Balekile
- Kabous Bezuidenhout
- Reuben du Plooy
- Armand Grobler
- Denzel Hill
- Qhama Hina
- Ethan Jeffrey
- Luxolo Koza
- Dehan Kruger
- Lihle Lolwane
- Siya Luwace
- Siya Masuku
- Raynardt Nel
- Freddy Ngoza
- Dwayne Pienaar
- Luaan Pieterse
- Pierre Rabie
- Zander van der Merwe
- Andrew Volschenk
Backs
- Ezrich Alexander
- Coert Cronjé
- Rodney Damons
- Jack Hart
- Ruben Liebenberg
- Franco Pienaar
- Johan Pretorius
- Lundi Ralarala
- Godfrey Ramaboea
- Anrich Richter
- Edwin Sass
- Andrew van Wyk
- Joshua Vermeulen
- Valentino Wellman
Coach
- JP Immelman

== Referees ==
The following referees officiated matches in the competition:

2021 Currie Cup First Division referees
- Aimee Barrett-Theron
- Griffin Colby
- Morné Ferreira
- Stephan Geldenhuys
- Phumzilo Mbewu
- Ruhan Meiring
- Paul Mente
- Rasta Rasivhenge

== See also ==
- 2021 Currie Cup Premier Division
