= Sri Lanka Sevens =

Annual rugby tournament in Sri Lanka

- Tournament logo in 2015
- Sport: Rugby sevens
- Founded: 1999 (Kandy) 2015 (re-est. Colombo)
- No. of teams: 24
- Most recent champion: Japan (2019)
- Most titles: Japan (6 titles)

The Sri Lanka Sevens is an annual international rugby sevens tournament held in Sri Lanka. Sponsored by telecommunications provider Dialog, the event has been part of the Asian Sevens Series since 2015. It was founded in 1999 as the Singer Sri Lankan Airlines Rugby 7s.

For ten seasons from 1999 to 2008, the tournament was hosted by the Kandy Sports Club at the Bogambara Stadium in Kandy. National men's teams from Asia and Europe were regular competitors. The event moved to Colombo for the 2009 and 2010 seasons after the Sri Lanka Rugby Football Union formed a partnership with the Tharunyata Hetak youth organisation to organise the Sri Lanka Sevens tournament.

The international team format was replaced in 2011 by the Carlton Super Sevens series, a competition featuring ten domestic Sri Lankan franchises. After four seasons the international format was re-established for 2015 with the Dialog Sri Lanka Sevens, held in Colombo.

== History ==
Singer Sri Lankan Airlines Rugby 7s Logo

=== Singer Sri Lankan Sevens (1999–2008) ===
Initially the competition was part of the Kandy Sports Club's 125th anniversary celebrations in 1999. The first tournament was limited to ten Asian rugby playing countries. A schools event ran concurrently with the international competition, with sixteen schools competing.

The original naming rights sponsors of the tournament were Sri Lankan Airlines and Singer (Sri Lanka). Other sponsors included Rolls-Royce, Airbus Industries, SITA, Haesl, IAE International, CFM, John Keells Elephant House, Lion Brewery and Amaya Resorts.

The inaugural cup was won by South Korea in Kandy in 1999. The tournament was made an open event and expanded to 16 teams in 2000, with teams from Europe competing. In that year and the following, Chinese Taipei won the cup. Portugal won in 2002. In 2003 teams from Africa (Kenya, Morocco and the Arabian Gulf) and Oceania (Australia, New Zealand and the Cook Islands) competed and the Kenyan national team was the winner of the cup.

The 2004 tournament was played as the Asian qualifier for the 2005 Rugby World Cup Sevens, and was once again limited to the Asian rugby playing nations. The winner was Japan, with Chinese Taipei and South Korea (second and third respectively) also qualifying for the Rugby World Cup Sevens. The tournament was subsequently recognised by the International Rugby Board as an IRB satellite event. In 2005 Japan won the cup. South Korea and Hong Kong won in 2006 and 2007, respectively, however the Japanese team was conspicuous by its absence.

The winner of the cup in 2008 was Malaysia.

=== Carlton Sri Lanka 7s (2009–2010) ===
Carlton Sports Club, the sports wing of Tharunyata Hetak (A Tomorrow for Youth), took over the running of the Sri Lanka Sevens in a partnership with the Sri Lanka Rugby Football Union in 2009. The tournament was moved to Colombo. It was officially recognised by the Asian Rugby Football Union (ARFU) in that year, and became the last event of the 2009 IRB Asian Sevens Series. Japan returned to play in the tournament and won the competition for a third time in 2009.

A number of non-official national sides competed in the 2010 tournament, with the Fiji Barbarians becoming the eventual winners. The 2010 event was also the last of the Carlton Sri Lanka Sevens under the international teams format due to the introduction of the Carlton Super 7s series, featuring local Sri Lankan franchises for the 2011 season.

Carlton Super 7s series logo

=== Carlton Super 7s series (2011–2014) ===
In 2011, the Carlton Sri Lanka 7s was transformed into the Carlton Super 7s series; a domestic club competition comprising two tournaments hosted on consecutive weekends. This format continued until 2014, although additional selection tournaments for local players were included at the start of the final two seasons.^{^{b}}

Prominent players from around the world were contracted to join each local franchise to raise the standard of competition. The tournament events were held at various locations in Sri Lanka, including Kandy, Galle and Koggala. The final leg of the series for each season was hosted in Colombo.

The Carlton Super 7s series was contested by ten teams, representing the nine provinces of the country and the Jaffna region:

- Central Kings
- Eastern Eagles
- Jaffna Challengers
- North Central Typhoons
- North Western Blacks
- Northern Gladiators
- Sabaragamuwa Stallions
- Southern Sharks
- Uva Vipers
- Western Warriors

=== Colombo Sevens (2015–present) ===
Following a sponsorship deal with telecommunications company Dialog, the international teams format was re-established in 2015 with the tournament hosted in Colombo. The 2015 event became the third and final leg of the Asian Sevens Series. The tournament was contested by eleven international teams over two days in October, with Japan the eventual winner, Hong Kong runners-up and Sri Lanka in third position. In 2016 the tournament was again the final leg of the Asian Sevens Series and contested by eight teams. The tournament was won by Hong Kong, with runners-up South Korea and third place going to China.

== Champions ==
| Year | Location | Venue | Winners | | | Ref. |
| Singer Sri Lankan 7s | | | Cup | Plate | Bowl | |
|---|---|---|---|---|---|---|
| 1999 | Kandy | Bogambara Stadium | South Korea | Malaysia | India | |
| 2000 | Kandy | Bogambara Stadium | Chinese Taipei | Japan | Thailand | |
| 2001 | Kandy | Bogambara Stadium | Chinese Taipei | Denmark | Czech Republic | |
| 2002 | Kandy | Bogambara Stadium | Portugal | South Korea | Hong Kong | |
| 2003 | Kandy | Bogambara Stadium | Kenya | Sri Lanka | (Cooperation Council for the Arab States of the Gulf) Arabian Gulf | |
| 2004 | Kandy | Bogambara Stadium | Japan | Sri Lanka | Kazakhstan | |
| 2005 | Kandy | Bogambara Stadium | Japan | Sri Lanka | (Cooperation Council for the Arab States of the Gulf) Arabian Gulf | |
| 2006 | Kandy | Bogambara Stadium | South Korea | Thailand | Malaysia | |
| 2007 | Kandy | Bogambara Stadium | Hong Kong | China | India | |
| 2008 | Kandy | Bogambara Stadium | Malaysia | Kazakhstan | Singapore | |
| Carlton Sri Lanka 7s | | | Cup | Plate | Bowl | |
| 2009 | Colombo | Sugathadasa Stadium | Japan | Thailand | Pakistan | |
| 2010 | Colombo | Sugathadasa Stadium | Fiji Barbarians | New Zealand Legends | Germany | |
| Carlton Super 7s | | | Champion of Series | Event winner | Event runner-up | |
| 2011 | Kandy | Bogambara Stadium | Central Kings | Southern Sharks | Central Kings | |
| 2011 | Colombo | Royal College | Central Kings | Central Kings | Western Warriors | |
| 2012^{^{a}} | Kandy | Bogambara Stadium | North Western Blacks; Jaffna Challengers | North Western Blacks | Southern Sharks | |
| 2012^{^{a}} | Colombo | Police Park | North Western Blacks; Jaffna Challengers | Jaffna Challengers | Western Warriors | |
| 2013^{^{b}} | Nuwara Eliya | Racecourse Ground | Jaffna Challengers | Southern Sharks | North Central Typhoons | |
| 2013^{^{b}} | Nawalapitiya | Jayathilleke Stadium | Jaffna Challengers | Central Kings | Eastern Eagles | |
| 2013^{^{b}} | Galle | International Stadium | Jaffna Challengers | Jaffna Challengers | Northern Gladiators | |
| 2013^{^{b}} | Colombo | Racecourse Complex | Jaffna Challengers | Sabaragamuwa Stallions | Jaffna Challengers | |
| 2014^{^{b}} | Kurunegala | St Anne's College | Western Warriors | North Central Typhoons | Northern Gladiators | |
| 2014^{^{b}} | Beliatta | Rajapaksa Stadium | Western Warriors | Northern Gladiators | North Central Typhoons | |
| 2014^{^{b}} | Koggala | Koggala BOI Ground | Western Warriors | Western Warriors | Southern Sharks | |
| 2014^{^{b}} | Colombo | Royal College | Western Warriors | Northern Gladiators | Western Warriors | |
| Dialog Sri Lanka 7s | | | Cup winner | Runner-up | Third | |
| 2015 † | Colombo | Racecourse Complex | Japan | Hong Kong | Sri Lanka | |
| 2016 † | Colombo | Racecourse Complex | Hong Kong | South Korea | China | |
| 2017 † | Colombo | Racecourse Complex | Hong Kong | Japan | Sri Lanka | |
| 2018 † | Colombo | Racecourse Complex | Japan | Hong Kong | Philippines | |
| 2019 † | Colombo | Racecourse Complex | Japan | Hong Kong | China | |
Cancelled due to the COVID-19 pandemic in 2020^{^{c}} and 2021^{^{d}}

Key — † indicates a tournament included in the Asia Rugby Sevens Series.

== Past champions (schools) ==
| Year | Venue | Cup | Plate | Bowl |
|---|---|---|---|---|
| 1999 | Bogambara Stadium | Isipathana College | Kingswood College | no competition |
| 2000 | Bogambara Stadium | St.Anthony's College | Trinity College | Wesley College |
| 2001 | Bogambara Stadium | St Peter's College | Wesley College | Ruhunu Combined |
| 2002 | Bogambara Stadium | Vidyartha College | St.Anthony's College | St. Thomas' College |
| 2003 | Bogambara Stadium | Isipathana College | Royal College | Dharmaraja College |
| 2004 | Bogambara Stadium | Kingswood College | St. Sylvester's College | Isipathana College |
| 2005 | Bogambara Stadium | St.Anthony's College | Science College | Dharmaraja College |
| 2006 | Bogambara Stadium | St.Anthony's College | Kingswood College | St. Sylvester's College |
| 2007 | Bogambara Stadium | Isipathana College | Dharmaraja College | Vidyartha College |
| 2008 | Bogambara Stadium | Isipathana College | Dharmaraja College | Ananda College |

== See also ==
- Rugby union in Sri Lanka
- Asian Sevens Series
- World Rugby Sevens Series
- Rugby World Cup Sevens

== Notes ==
^a The Jaffna Challengers and North Western Blacks were declared joint champions of the 2012 Carlton Super Sevens series.

^b Local tournaments (shown in italics) were added to the Carlton series for the final two seasons. These tournaments were not part of the Carlton Super 7s competition that included marquee international players, but were used as preparation to select the best local players for the main competition later in the season. In 2013 the local tournaments were at Nuwara Eliya and Nawalapitiya. In 2014 they were held at Kurunegala and Beliatta.

^^{c} Colombo was scheduled for 26–27 September as the third leg of the 2020 Asian Sevens Series, prior to August 2020 when Asia Rugby cancelled all their remaining competitions for the year due to the impact of the COVID-19 pandemic.

^^{d} Colombo was scheduled for 25–26 September as the third leg of the 2021 Asian Sevens Series, but was subsequently replaced in the calendar by Dubai.
