= Trinity College Rugby Stadium =

Rugby stadium in Pallekele, Sri Lanka

- ත්‍රිත්ව විද්‍යාලයීය රග්බි ක්‍රීඩාංගණය; டிரினிட்டி கல்லூரி ரக்பி மைதானம்
- Lion's Den
- Interactive map of Trinity College Rugby Stadium
- Address: Pallekele, Sri Lanka
- Coordinates: 7°16′45″N 80°42′34″E
- Owner: Trinity College
- Operator: Trinity College
- Type: Stadium
- Events: Rugby and football
- Surface: Grass
- Field size: 120 m × 70 m (131 yd × 77 yd)
- Acreage: 4 ha (9.9 acres)
- Public transit: A26 highway

Construction
- Groundbreaking: 31 October 1993; 32 years ago
- Opened: 3 May 1997; 29 years ago

Tenants
- Trinity College Rugby; Trinity College Football

Website
- trinitycollege.lk

Trinity College Rugby Stadium, also known as the Lion's Den, is a rugby union and football stadium in Pallekele, Sri Lanka. It is owned by Trinity College, Kandy and serves as the home ground for the Trinity College rugby and football teams.

== History ==
=== Background ===
Before the construction of the Trinity College Rugby Stadium (TCRS), Trinity College played its home rugby fixtures at Bogambara Stadium, Nittawela Rugby Stadium, or occasionally at the University Rugby Football Ground in Peradeniya. Rugby practices, training matches, and inter-house competitions were held at Asgiriya Stadium, a venue owned by Trinity College.

Given Asgiriya's status as a Test cricket venue, continued rugby use was deemed unsuitable. Due to Kandy's limited number of suitable sporting venues, Trinity College sought an alternative location to establish a rugby venue near the city. This endeavour was successful when President D. B. Wijetunga, through the Urban Development Authority (UDA) and with cabinet approval, granted the school a 4 ha (9.9 acres) land extent in Pallekele, about 12 km (7.5 mi) away from Kandy, on a 99-year lease for the construction of a rugby stadium.

=== Construction ===
Construction of the TCRS began in February 1994, following an inaugural walk from the school to the Pallekele land on 31 October 1993, led by principal, L. M. De Alwis. Another walk from the school to the stadium under construction took place on 18 January 1997, coinciding with Trinity College's 125th anniversary celebrations.

=== Opening and early matches ===
The inaugural inter-school rugby match at TCRS was contested between Trinity College and Vidyartha College, Kandy, on 3 May 1997, with Trinity College's First XV emerging victorious 31–7. The first Bradby Shield match hosted at TCRS was on 21 June 1997, when Trinity College faced Royal College, Colombo, in the first leg of the 53rd encounter. Trinity College won 14–6.

=== Home ground of Trinity College ===
Since 1997, Trinity College has hosted nearly all of its home matches from the schools rugby league at TCRS. Due to ongoing construction and facility improvements, Bradby Shield matches were held intermittently at Pallekele until 2012. Since then, Trinity College has consistently hosted the Kandy leg of the Bradby Shield at TCRS. The stadium is also referred to as the "Lion's Den", a commonly used nickname.

=== Notable matches ===
On 2 August 2025, Trinity College played Wesley College, Colombo at TCRS in a 2025 Dialog Schools Rugby League second round fixture, with Trinity College winning 23–21. This result, along with other league results that weekend, mathematically ensured Trinity College won the Schools Rugby League with one match remaining. It was their first Schools Rugby League title since 1987. They were awarded the championship trophy on 10 August 2025 following the final league match against St. Peter's College, Colombo at TCRS, which they lost 20–22.

== Usage ==
TCRS serves as a venue for Trinity College inter-house rugby and football matches, as well as inter-school football matches. Occasionally, TCRS has been utilised by Sri Lanka Rugby, the Football Federation of Sri Lanka, and other schools from Kandy to host sporting events or tournaments.

== See also ==
- Rugby union in Sri Lanka

== Note ==
Sources

- "The Trinity Story 1872–2022". history.trinitycollege.lk. 12 February 2024. Archived from the original on 13 May 2025.
- Perera, S. S. (June 1994). Royal vs Trinity – 50 Years of Bradby Shield 1945–1994. Bradby Shield Encounter Organising Committee.
- Behind the Shield – the history, the heroes, the hearts of 75 years 1945–2019. Bradby Shield Encounter Organising Committee. June 2019.
