= Morné Ferreira =

South African rugby union referee

- Born: 2 February 1994 (age 32) South Africa
- Height: 1.76 m (5 ft 9 1/2 in)
- Weight: 74 kg (11 st 9 lb; 163 lb)
- School: Afrikaanse Hoër Seunskool, Pretoria, South Africa
- University: University of Pretoria

Rugby union career
Refereeing career
Years	Competition	Apps
2021–	Internationals	3
2023–	EPCR	5
2022–	United Rugby Championship	14
2021–	Currie Cup	26
2021–2024	World Rugby Sevens Series	97
2024	Olympic Games Rugby Sevens	2
2022	Commonwealth Games Rugby	6
2022	Rugby World Cup Sevens	4

Morné Ferreira (born 2 February 1994) is a rugby union referee, currently on the South African Rugby Union's Elite Panel.

== Career ==
Ferreira is a member of the Blue Bulls Rugby Union Referee's society. In 2019, he refereed at the Craven Week, the premier rugby tournament for schools in South Africa, and also took charge of the u18 International match between France and Wales. He was also selected to referee at the 2019 Africa Men's Sevens Olympic Qualifying tournament.

In 2020, he made his Varsity Cup debut and took charge of three matches in the u21 Provincial Championship. He officiated in a number of matches in the 2021 Varsity Cup, culminating in him taking charge of the Varsity Cup final between the University of Cape Town and the University of Pretoria. He then took charge of two u20 International matches between Argentina and Georgia as well as South Africa and Georgia before making his Currie Cup debut on 2 July 2021, refereeing the First Division match between the Falcons and the Leopards . He refereed a further two matches in the Currie Cup First Division before refereeing the 2021 Currie Cup First Division semi-final between the Griffons and the Falcons on 7 August 2021. He made his Currie Cup Premier Division refereeing debut on 21 July 2021, officiating the match between the Free State Cheetahs and the Western Province in Bloemfontein.

2022 started off well for Ferreira as he again refereed a number of Varsity Cup matches while he continued to make his mark in South Africa's premier rugby competition by refereeing 6 matches during the round-robin stage of the Currie Cup. He capped off the Currie Cup Premier Division season by refereeing the semi-final fixture between the Free State Cheetahs and the Pumas in Bloemfontein. On 15 October 2022, Ferreira made his United Rugby Championship debut, refereeing the match between the Scarlets and Zebre Parma. Ferreira had the honour to take the whistle in his first Currie Cup Premier Final when he was appointed to referee the match between the Lions and the Sharks.

== International ==
In 2021, Ferreira was named on the World Rugby Sevens Series Panel, making his debut at the HSBC Emirates Dubai 7's tournament in November of that year. He also made his 15's international debut at the Stellenbosch Challenge in November 2021 refereeing two matches; Namibia vs Kenya and Kenya vs Brazil. 2022 turned out to be a big year for Ferreira at high-performance 7's level as he was confirmed as one of 8 men's referees to referee at the Commonwealth Games in Birmingham. He was also announced on the squad of 10 men's referees to hold the whistle for the Rugby World Cup Sevens in Cape Town . In 2023, Ferreira made his debut in the Six Nations Under 20s Championship when he took charge of the match between Scotland and Italy on 19 March.

Ferreira was appointed as a referee to the 2023 and 2024 editions of the World Rugby u20 Championships held in South Africa. During the 2024 competition, he refereed the semi final encounter between England and Ireland. Also in 2024, Ferreira was selected as part of a 12-man referee team to officiate at the 2024 Paris Olympic Games. During the End-of-year Internationals in November 2024, Ferreira refereed his first test match abroad when he was appointed as the referee for the match between Spain and Fiji.

== Personal life ==
Ferreira has a Master's degree in Neuro and Exercise Physiology obtained from the University of Pretoria. He is the younger brother of JP Ferreira, who is currently the defence coach at Bath Rugby in England.
