= Ajith Abeyratne =

Sri Lankan rugby union player (1948–2023)

- Born: 1948
- Died: 25 October 2023 (aged 75)
- School: Trinity College, Kandy

Rugby union career
- Position: number eight
Senior career
Years	Team	Apps	(Points)
1968-1974	CR & FC		
International career
Years	Team	Apps	(Points)
- Sri Lanka
National sevens team
Years	Team		Comps
- Sri Lanka

Ajith Abeyratne (1948 – 25 October 2023) was a Sri Lankan rugby union player, administrator, commentator and coach.

== Playing career ==
During his schooling days at Trinity College, he excelled in numerous sports including rugby, cricket, basketball, tennis, athletics and basketball. He began playing rugby at school level at the age of 15. He rose to prominence and limelight as a household name in Kandy for his sporting pedigree. He made his fully-fledged rugby debut for Trinity First XV outfit in 1965. He began his rugby career as a second row forward.

Abeyratne captained the Trinity College school rugby teams in 1967 and 1968. He subsequently won the school colours and the prestigious coveted Lion in rugby. He was also adjudged as the best all-round student in 1968 for which he was conferred with the prestigious Ryde Gold Medal. He was an integral member of Trinity rugby side which clinched both legs of the Bradby Shield in 1967 to become overall champions. He also thrived in cricket as he famously scored a quickfire 62 ball century in a span of just 69 minutes in a schools cricket match against Royal College in 1968 at Asgiriya Stadium and it remains the fastest century recorded by a batsman in a schools match encounter between Trinity College and Royal College.

Abeyratne also eventually represented Ceylonese Rugby & Football Club in club rugby between 1968 and 1974. He also went onto play for Sri Lanka national rugby union team from 1968 to 1971.

== Coaching career ==
Abeyratne also served as the national head coach of Sri Lanka national rugby sevens team for a brief stint which lasted for around three years from 1985 to 1988. Under his coaching tenure, Sri Lankan rugby sevens side became runners-up twice in bowls competition at the 1986 and 1987 Hong Kong Sevens. Sri Lanka 7's also made overseas tours to Wales, Hong Kong, Australia, Taiwan and Singapore during his coaching stint with the national team. He also coached Sri Lankan rugby sevens team for the 1987 World Rugby Sevens which was held in Sydney. He also worked as head coach and consultant of Ceylonese Rugby & Football Club for nearly two decades.

Abeyratne was in the forefront as an important member of the Technical Committee appointed by Sri Lanka Rugby to analyse the players performances and training campaigns of players just ahead of Korean leg and UAE leg of the 2022 Asia Rugby Sevens. He also obtained coaching certificates from Wales, England, Australia and New Zealand and also obtained International Rugby Board Level 3 certificate.

== Death ==
Ajith Abeyratne died on 25 October 2023, at the age of 75.
