= Science College, Mount Lavinia =

Science College, Mt. Lavinia
- Mount Lavinia; Sri Lanka

Information
- Type: national
- Motto: "ඤාණං උදපාදී...විජ්ජා උදපාදී... !!!"
- Established: 1977; 49 years ago
- Founder: Mapalagama Vipulasara Himi
- Principal: Susantha Mendis
- Grades: Class 1 - 13
- Gender: Boys
- Age: 6 to 19
- Enrollment: 2,500
- Colours: Gold, maroon, silver
- Song: Sri sattisara gana probodhitha
- Publication: Science College Magazine; The Science
- Former pupils: Old Science
- Website: www.sciencecollege.lk

Science College Mount Lavinia (විද්‍යා විද්‍යාලය) is a national school in the Piliyandala Zone, Sri Lanka. The school has risen to fame within a span of 40 years.

== History ==
At the request of Poojya Mapalagama Vipulasara Himi of Rathmalana Paramadhammachethiya Pirivena, in 1977 the school was declared open by the Minister of Education, Al Haj Badl-ud-Din, as “Sri Sadhissara Maha Vidyalaya”. The first principal was L. P. Wijesundara. The school received the approval to teach science and commerce streams for grades 10 and 11.

In 1982, due to the influence of the Minister of Education, Ranil Wickramasinghe and Rathmalana Electorate parliament member Lalith Athulathmudali, the “Hena Para primary school” was joined with “Sri Sadhissara Maha Vidyalaya” creating a new school, South Colombo Science College.

Prof. L. A. Vitharana assumed duties as the first principal of the Science College. Vitharana was able to increase the number of students to 750. He was the pioneer of the school flag and the college song. During his tenure extracurricular activities of the college reached national level.

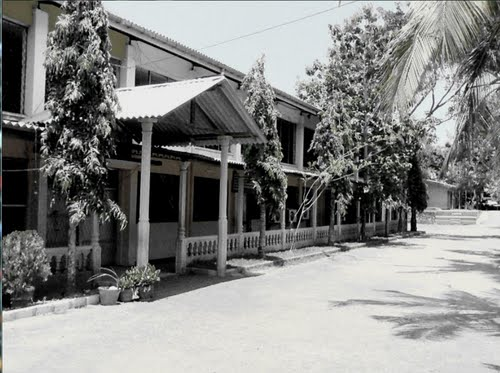
Science College main building

== Past principals ==
- L. P. Wijesundara
- L. A. Vitharana
- K. K. Wijepala
- R.N.Edissooriya
- Kithsiri Samarasinghe
- P. D. Dahanayake
- Gamini Sisil Silva
- M. T. Tuder
- H. M. S. K. Kodikara
- Ananda Nagasinghe
- Dayarathna Bandara
- D. B. Peramuna

== Houses ==
There are four houses at the college, students are allocated to them according to their admission number. The houses are: Faraday, Darwin and Luvi

== Sports ==
=== Rugby ===
In 2015 Science College won the Milo President's Trophy Knockout Tournament for the first time, after they defeated Isipathana College, 21–18 in the final.
