= Victoria Golf Course =

Golf club in Sri Lanka

Victoria Golf & Country Resort
- Location within Sri Lanka
- 7.2651°N 80.7743°E

Club information
- Location: Victoria Golf Club Road, Digana, Sri Lanka
- Established: 13 January 1999; 27 years ago
- Type: Private
- Owner: Rajawella Holdings
- Tota holes: 18
- Tournaments: Donald Steel Trophy; Ebert Pot; Pam Fernando Trophy; Victoria Bowl
- Website: golfsrilanka.com
- Designed by: Donald Steel / Martin Ebert
- Par: 73 (Mens) 72 (Ladies)
- Length: 6,190 yards (5,660 m)
- Course rating: 73
- Slope rating: 113

The Victoria Golf and Country Resort is one of the newest Golf Clubs in Sri Lanka.

The resort is situated on a former 209 ha (520 acres) coconut and coffee plantation, located adjacent to the Victoria Reservoir. The concept was initially conceived by Mark Bostock, the former chairman of John Keells Holdings in 1950s. The 18-hole golf course was designed to USPGA specifications by golf architects, Donald Steel and Martin Ebert. Construction commenced in 1996 and was completed in January 1999. The course was named "Best in Asia" in 2005 by the publication Asian Golf, and is also ranked in the top 100 of "Most Beautiful Courses in the World" by Golf Digest.

== See also ==
- Royal Colombo Golf Club
- Nuwara Eliya Golf Club
