= Royal College Sports Complex =

Rugby ground and multi-purpose sports complex in Colombo, Sri Lanka

- රාජකීය විද්‍යාලයීය ක්‍රීඩා සංකීර්ණය ராயல் கல்லூரி விளையாட்டு வளாகம்
- Interactive map of Royal College Sports Complex
- Former names: Royal College Rugby Grounds
- Address: Sri Lanka Foundation Mawatha, Colombo 00700, Sri Lanka
- Coordinates: 6.90274°N 79.86474°E
- Owner: Royal College
- Operator: Royal College Union
- Capacity: 15,000
- Type: Multi-purpose sports complex
- Surface: Grass

Construction
- Opened: 10 May 2001

Website
- rcsc.lk

The Royal College Sports Complex is the rugby union grounds of Royal College, Colombo, previously known as the Royal College Rugby Grounds. It serves as a multi-use stadium and sports complex. Built in 2000 with funds from the Royal College Union (RCU), current students, and parents, it is managed by a Board of Management appointed by the RCU.

== History ==
The land on the eastern side of Reid Avenue, was part of the Colombo Racecourse and the Colombo Turf Club. During World War II it was the site of the RAF airstrip. When horse racing declined after gambling was outlawed in the 1950s Colombo Racecourse and its land fell into disuse and was taken over by the government. The large land extent was segmented and distributed to government entities. Royal College Colombo, received a four-acre plot which became the Royal College Rugby Grounds.

In 2000, work began at the rugby grounds for a state of the art sports complex up to international standards to host multiple sports and a modern gymnasium. The indoor stadium houses a 450 seating capacity along with two squash courts with a 150-seat capacity and a badminton courts with 250 seats. In 2013 an additional seating tier, the "Royal -Brandix Sky Pavilion", was constructed increasing the outdoor arena capacity to 12,500 including the terraces. As of 2024, the outdoor rugby stadium has a spectator capacity of 15,000, with 6,000 seated and 9,000 standing-room-only terraces (RCSC | Facilities | Rugby). The complex also boasts a 120 unit car park with basement parking.

== Sports ==
Royal College Sports Complex grounds serves as a venue for rugby union, football, baseball, and hockey. The indoor stadium is a venue for squash, badminton, basketball, volleyball, and boxing.

== See also ==
- Rugby union in Sri Lanka
- Bradby Shield Encounter
- Sri Lankan National Badminton Championships
