= Pallekele =

Suburb of Kandy, Sri Lanka

Pallekele පල්ලේකැලේ பல்லேகல
- Suburb
- Location within Sri Lanka
- Coordinates: 7.28011°N 80.70203°E
- Country: Sri Lanka
- Province: Central Province
- District: Kandy District
- Time zone: UTC+5:30 (SLT)
- Postal Code: 20168
- Area code: 081

Pallekele is a suburb of the city of Kandy in the Kandy District of the Central Province, Sri Lanka. This area is notable for hosting several significant institutions, including the Pallekele International Cricket Stadium, the Trinity College Rugby Stadium, the Sri Lanka International Buddhist Academy (SIBA), and the PALK Seismic Station.

== Pallekele International Cricket Stadium ==
The Pallekele International Cricket Stadium (PICS), located in nearby Balagolla and the third largest cricket stadium in Sri Lanka, is named after Pallekele.

This facility is utilised to host a variety of cricket matches, including international men's and women's contests, matches from the Lanka Premier League, club cricket, and inter-school competitions. These events are organised under the auspices of Sri Lanka Cricket, the owners of the stadium.

The inaugural international cricket match played at the venue was a Test match between Sri Lanka and the West Indies from 1–5 December 2010. By dismissing Chris Gayle of West Indies, Sri Lanka's Suranga Lakmal became the third bowler to take a wicket with the first ball bowled in a Test match at a new venue, joining Kapil Dev of India and Imran Khan of Pakistan.
