= Samuel Kadirgamar I =

Samuel Jebaratnam Christian Kadirgamar I, JP, UM (known as Samuel J.C.Kadirgamar Snr) was a Ceylonese (Sri Lankan) proctor.

Born in Jaffna, his was the son of Karthigeyan Kadirgamar an interpreter Maudaliyar who became the first Ceylonese Registrar General of the Supreme Court. The family was a Tamil Vellala family which had converted to Protestantism. His brother was Rev. J. W. A. Kadirgamar.

Samuel Kadirgamar came to Colombo and was educated at St. Thomas' College, Mutwal. He became a proctor and formed the law firm Kadirgamar and Wilson. He went on to become the President of the Colombo Proctor's Association and the founder President of the Law Society of Ceylon. He was appointed as a Justice of the Peace and an Unofficial magistrate.

Kadirgamar married Edith Rosemand Parimalam Mather, the daughter of Edward Mather of Manipay. The couple had five children. Their sons were S.J.C.Kadirgamar Jr., QC who became an eminent lawyer in commercial law; Rear Admiral Rajan Kadirgamar, who became the head of the Royal Ceylon Navy; Major Selvanathan "Bai" Kadirgamar, who served as the Deputy Assistant Quartermaster-General (DAQMG) of the Ceylon Army; Thirumalan "Mana" Kadirgamar a planter who died in a motor accident very young and the youngest was Lakshman Kadirgamar, PC, who became the Minister of Foreign Affairs.
