= Milo President's Trophy Knockout Tournament =

Annual rugby tournament in Sri Lanka

Milo President's Trophy
- Sport: Rugby union
- Formerly known as: Premadasa Trophy; Prime Minister's Trophy
- Inaugural season: 1985
- Number of teams: 16 (2026)
- Country: Sri Lanka (Sri Lanka Schools Rugby Football Association)
- Holders: Trinity College (2026)
- Most titles: Isipathana College (13 titles)
- Related competition: Dialog Schools Rugby League

The Milo President's Trophy is an annual school knockout u/20 rugby tournament in Sri Lanka. The tournament was first staged in 1985 when it was known as the Premadasa Trophy, named after Ranasinghe Premadasa (the then Prime Minister). The tournament involves the top seven school teams in the Division 1A Group and the winner of the Division 1B Group. In 2007 the tournament was expanded to include the Premier Trophy and in 2008 the Chairman's Trophy, to provide more school teams with the opportunity to compete at the same level.

In 2009 it was renamed as the Milo Trophy after two years it returned to its original name as the Milo President's Trophy.

In 2010 the scheduled final was suspended at the last minute by the authorities due to a court order issued by Isipathana College. The two teams, St. Peter's College and Royal College, however still played albeit as a friendly encounter, with St Peter's College winning 29–27. After two years, the court case was dismissed and the two schools were jointly awarded the Trophy.

In 2015 it was contested by only six sides, Royal College (2015 league champions), Isipathana College (league runner-up), Trinity College (third seed), Science College (fourth seed), St. Peter's College (fifth seed) and D. S. Senanayake College, after injuries decimated the league's sixth-placed finisher St. Joseph's College, league plate champions Wesley College and plate runner-up St. Anthony's. The President's Trophy was won by Science College for the first time, who defeated Isipathana College 21–18 in the final. Lalith Athulathmudali College won the Premier Trophy defeating Mahanama College 17–14 and in the Chairman's Trophy, St. Thomas' College, Matale, defeated Carey College, Colombo 7–0 in the final.

The competition in 2016 was essentially only contested by seven teams, with defending champions Science College withdrawing from the tournament due to financial issues, Trinity College deciding not to participate and the 2015 league plate champions St. Joseph's College pulling out due to injuries. D. S. Senanayake College who finished fourth in the league plate and twelfth in the league were scheduled to play due to Trinity College's withdrawal, however, they opted not to compete claiming that they have not had enough time to prepare for the tournament. The final was scheduled to be played on 9 July at the Royal Sports Complex but Isipathana lodged a protest insisting that Royal College would have a home ground advantage. The final was then rescheduled to be played at the Colombo Racecourse on 16 July however Isipathana objected as it would interfere with preparations for the national under-18s tour of Hong Kong. Both sides subsequently agreed to play the final on 13 July, where Isipathana College regained the President's Trophy by defeating Royal College 47–12. Thurstan College collected the Premier Trophy by successfully defeating St. John's College, Nugegoda 15–5, and St. Thomas' College, Matale won the Chairman's Trophy by beating Vidyaloka Maha Vidyalaya, Galle, 57 to nil.

In 2017 the tournament was contested amongst seven schools being Dharmaraja College, Wesley College, St. Joseph's College, Trinity College, St. Peter's College, Isipathana College and St. Anthony's College. The school's league champions, Royal College, pulling out of the event due to injury concerns. The quarterfinals were held at Sugathadasa Stadium between 9 and 11 June 2017. The semi-finals were held on 17 and 18 June at the Colombo Racecourse and the finals were on the 24 June at the same venue. Playing in their first-ever major rugby final St. Joseph's College clinched their maiden Milo President's Trophy by beating Isipathana College by 19–13. The Milo Premier's Trophy was held on 23 June 2017 at Sugathadasa Stadium, where Maliyadeva College defeated Ananda College 22–20. The final for the Chairman's Trophy was held earlier the same day, with St. Anne's College, Kurunegala beating Carey College, Colombo 15–12.

== Past winners ==
Year	Winner	Score		Runner-up	Comments
1985	Isipathana College	8	3	Ananda College	
1986	Isipathana College	7	4	Royal College	
1987	Trinity College	12	3	Isipathana College	
1988	Royal College	13	3	Isipathana College	
1989	S. Thomas' College	15	3	Isipathana College	
1990	S. Thomas' College	4	11	Isipathana College	The trophy was awarded to STC after IC was found guilty of fielding an over-age player.
1991	S. Thomas' College			Ananda College	
1992	Isipathana College	9	8	Ananda College	
1993	Trinity College			Isipathana College	
1994	S. Thomas' College	8	6	St. Peter's College	Final edition of the Premadasa Trophy
1995	St. Peter's College	6	3	Isipathana College	Premadasa Trophy was changed to Milo Presidents Trophy Knockouts
1996	Isipathana College	15	7	St. Peter's College	
1997	Isipathana College	26	9	Thurstan College	
1998	Thurstan College	9	11	Zahira College	The trophy was awarded to Thurstan after Zahira was found guilty of fielding an over-age player.
1999	Isipathana College	27	10	Ananda College	
2000	Kingswood College	30	26	S. Thomas College	
2001	Isipathana College	20	17	St. Peter's College	
2002	Royal College	20	8	Wesley College	
2003	Kingswood College	26	22	S. Thomas' College	Kingswood entered the President's Trophy as ‘B’ Division champions and defeat S. Thomas' College in the final.
2004	Kingswood College			Wesley College	
2005	Kingswood College			St. Peter's College	
2006	St. Peter's College	8	3	Kingswood College	
2007	St. Peter's College	23	13	Isipathana College	
2008	St. Peter's College	16	11	Isipathana College	
2009	S. Thomas' College	22	19	Isipathana College	
2010	St. Peter's College / Royal College				St.Peter's beat Royal 29-27 in a friendly match due to court order. The trophy was jointly awarded to both schools later.
2011	Trinity College	21	10	Isipathana College	
2012	Isipathana College	21	16	Trinity College	
2013	Wesley College	34	21	Trinity College	
2014	Isipathana College	27	22	Royal College	
2015	Science College	21	18	Isipathana College	
2016	Isipathana College	47	12	Royal College	
2017	St. Josephs' College	19	13	Isipathana College	
2018	St. Peter's College	22	20	St. Joseph's College	
2019	St. Peter's College	18	15	Wesley College	
2022	Isipathana College	49	22	St. Joseph's College	
2023	St. Peter's College	25	16	Isipathana College	
2024	Isipathana College	34	29	St. Peter's College	
2025	Isipathana College	12	9	Trinity College	
2026	Trinity College	58	26	Royal College	

== Total wins ==
Isipathana College are the most successful schools rugby team having won the knockout tournament a total of thirteen times, including three wins whilst it was still the Prime Minister's Trophy (1985–95) and have been the runner up twelve times. St. Peter's College has won the trophy eight times (1995, 2006, 2007, 2008, 2010 where it was joint champions with Royal College, 2018, 2019 and 2023) and have been runner up five times. S Thomas' College are the next most successful school having won the trophy five times (1989, 1990, 1991, 1994 and 2009). Kingswood College has won it four times in (2000, 2003, 2004 and 2005), with Royal College winning it three times (1988, 2002 and 2010 joint champions with St. Peter's College) along with Trinity College (1987, 1993 and 2011). Four teams have won it just once Thurstan College (1998), Wesley College (2013), Science College (2015) and St. Josephs' College (2017). Ananda College have been runners-up four times (1985, 1991, 1992 and 1999) but have yet to win the trophy.

School	Wins	Year
Isipathana College	13	1985, 1986, 1992, 1996, 1997, 1999, 2001, 2012, 2014, 2016, 2022, 2024, 2025
St Peter's College	8	1995, 2006, 2007, 2008, 2010‡, 2018, 2019,2023
S. Thomas' College	5	1989, 1990, 1991, 1994, 2009
Kingswood College	4	2000, 2003, 2004, 2005
Trinity College	4	1987, 1993, 2011, 2026
Royal College	3	1988, 2002, 2010‡
Thurstan College	1	1998
Wesley College	1	2013
Science College	1	2015
St. Josephs' College	1	2017

- ‡ Shared
