= Police Park =

Park in Tehran, Iran

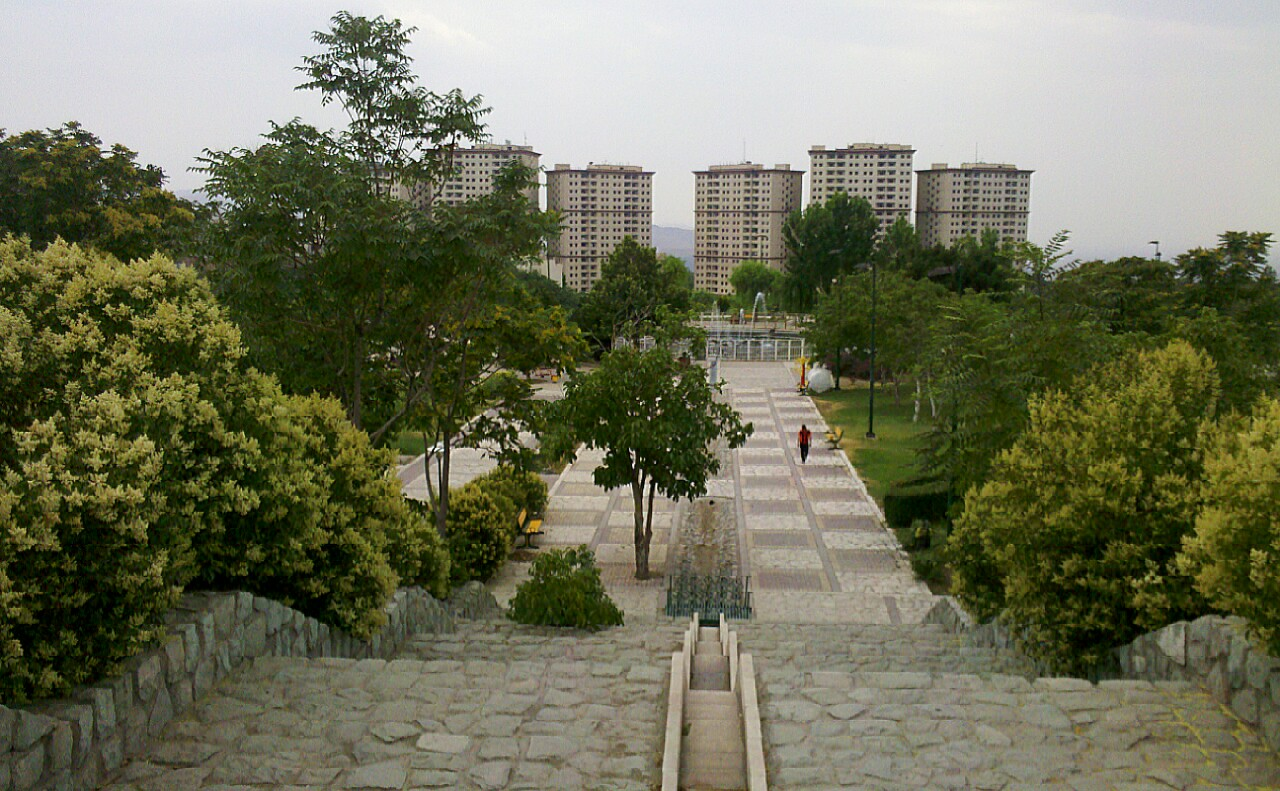
- View of Police Park in 2013
- Interactive map of Police Park
- Type: Urban park
- Location: Tehran
- Coordinates: 35°45′35″N 51°32′40″E
- Status: Bombed

Police Park (Persian: پارک پلیس Pārk-e Pelis) is a park in Tehran. The park is located in the city's fourth district, and is bisected by Esteqlal Boulevard.

== History ==
The park was formerly known as Pomegranate Garden (باغ اناری), and was renamed as part of an effort to rejuvenate its image, as it had attracted illicit drug use.

The park was bombed by Israel during the 2026 Iran War. Trita Parsi of the Quincy Institute for Responsible Statecraft speculated that the park was chosen as a target by artificial intelligence due to its name, without any subsequent human oversight to realise that it was not a piece of police infrastructure.
