= Bogambara Stadium =

Multi-purpose stadium in Kandy, Sri Lanka

- බෝගම්බර ක්‍රිඩාංගනය
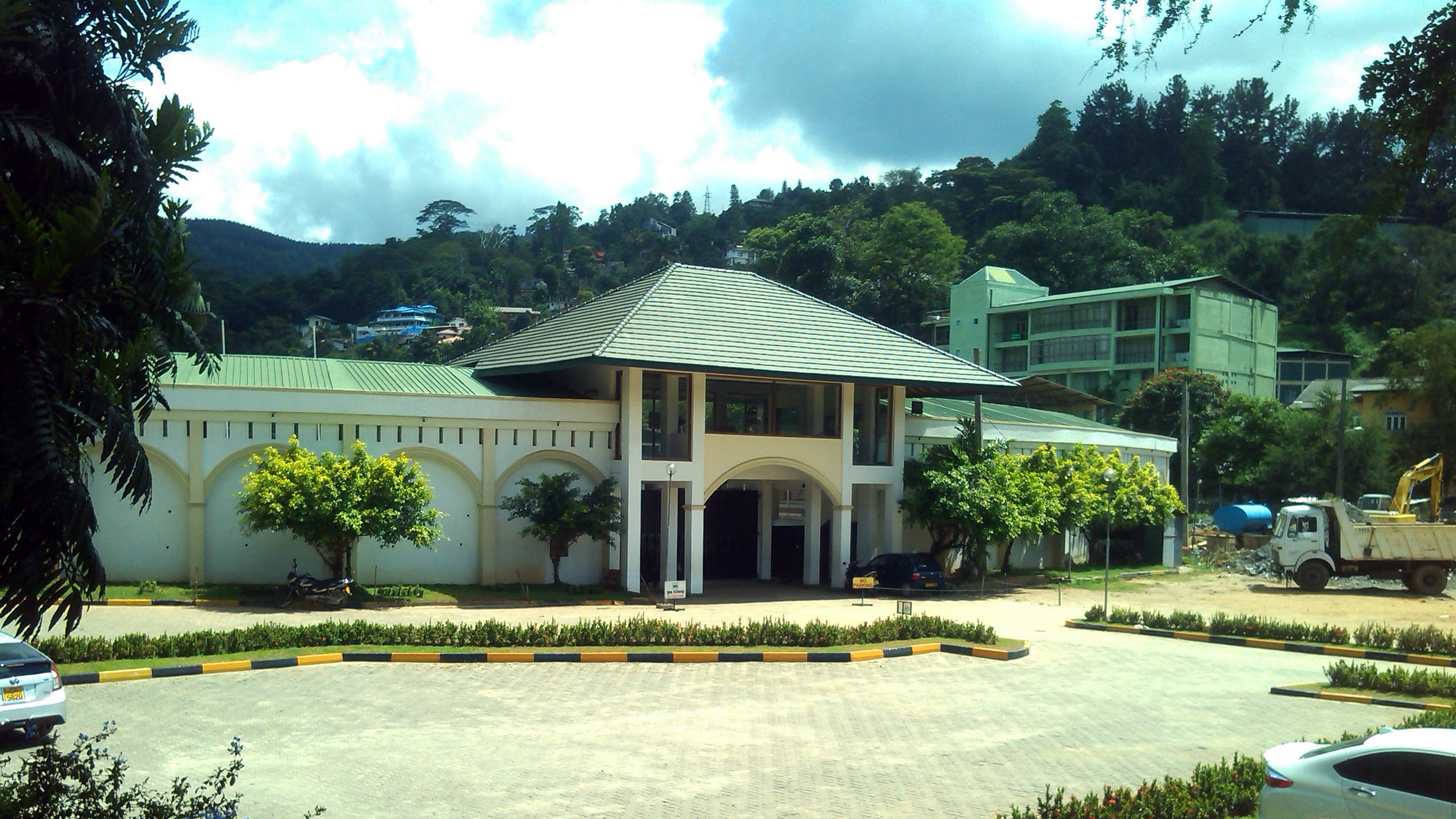
- Main Entrance of the Bogambara Stadium
- Interactive map of Bogambara Stadium
- Location: Kandy, Sri Lanka
- Coordinates: 7°17′20″N 80°38′07″E
- Owner: Sugathadasa National Sports Complex Authority
- Type: Stadium
- Event: Sporting Events
- Surface: Grass (Field & Track)
- Scoreboard: Yes (For Rugby & Football)

Construction
- Groundbreaking: 1897
- Renovated: 1972

Tenants
- St.Anthony’s College (Rugby); Dharmaraja College (Rugby); Kingswood College (Rugby); Trinity College (Rugby); Singer Sri Lankan Airlines Rugby 7's (1999-2008)

Bogambara Stadium (Sinhala: බෝගම්බර ක්‍රිඩාංගනය) is a multi-purpose stadium in Kandy, Sri Lanka It is one of the oldest grounds in the country. Stadium is currently used mostly for Rugby matches and hosted the games of the Singer Sri Lankan Airlines Rugby 7's. It has a capacity of 30,000.

== Early history ==
In 1897 the grounds were converted from a lake to a playing field. At one time it was the site for carnivals, games circuses and gymkhana activities and even an execution ground during the British occupation. A number of sporting clubs including Kandy Sports Club, Young's Stars SC, Young Wanders SC, Green Field SC and schools including St. Anthony's, Trinity College, Sri Rahula College, St. Paul's (now known as Sri Sumangala College), Dharmaraja College and Kingswood College used the venue to conduct cricket, football, rugby, hockey and athletics. Bogambara Stadium was not only used for sports, it was also used for folk sports including elle, bahu, thattu and gudu.

== Sports ==
Bogambara Stadium serves as a venue for various sports, including rugby, football, hockey, athletics, netball, basketball, softball, and cricket.

== Stadium development ==
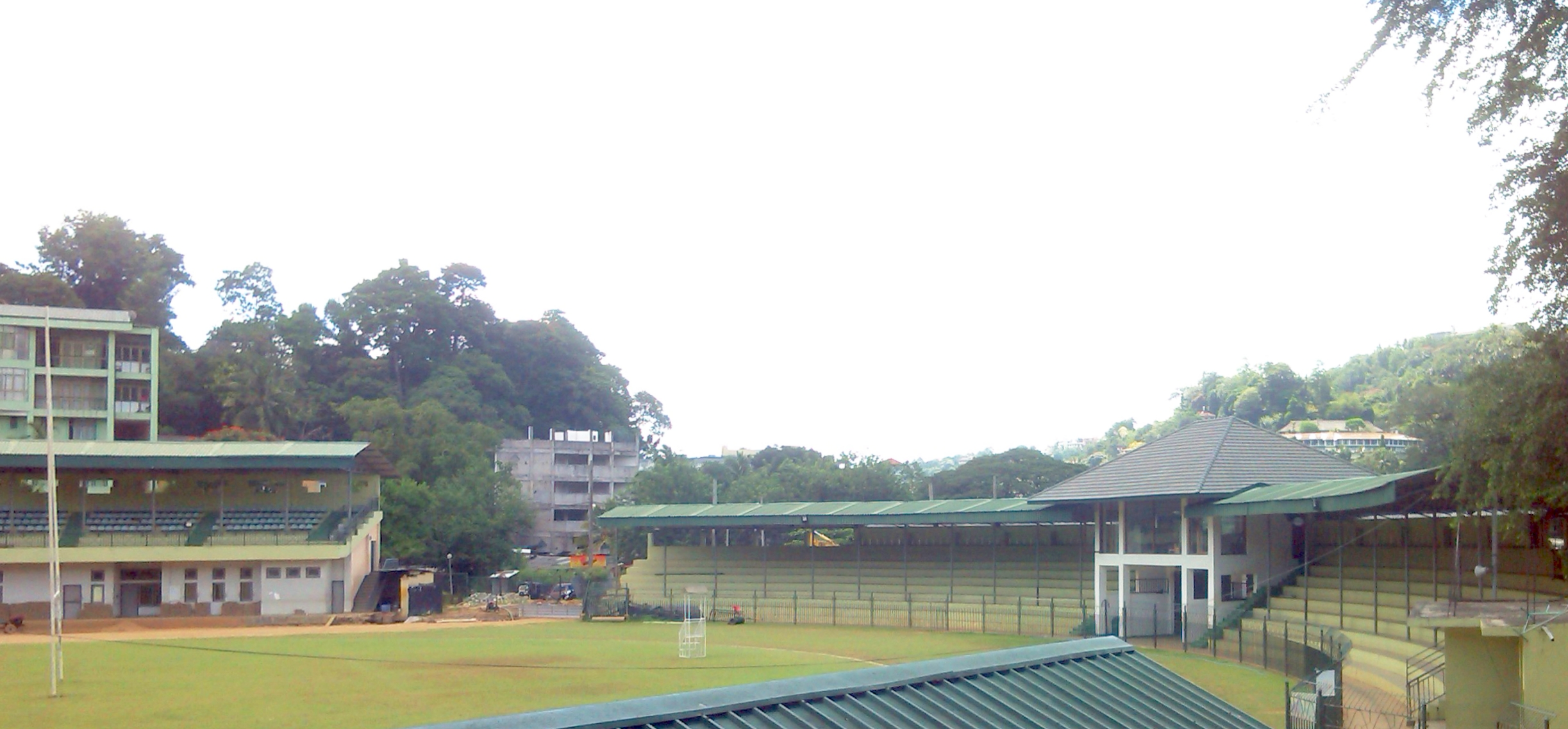
Inside of the stadium after redevelopment in 2015

Bogambara Stadium was renovated into a stadium in 1972, thanks to the Special Commissionership of M. B. Samarakoon, who initiated the renovation work with support from local politicians such as E. L. Senanayake, Noel Wimalasena, Shelton Ranaraja, and E. W. Balasuriya, a local sports promoter and philanthropist, who assisted in raising donations. In 1997 the Bogambara stadium was upgraded to an international standard stadium, at a cost of Rs. 89 million, with 75% of the funding coming from the Kandy District Sports Development Foundation, chaired by Anuruddha Ratwatte, the Deputy Minister of Defence. It was re-developed under the patronage of the municipal council and presently the Sports Ministry owns the premises. The ground fees are on the higher side and the less affluent football and hockey clubs are finding it difficult to keep the game alive.

== Major events ==
- Bradby Shield Encounter
- Singer Sri Lankan Airlines Rugby 7's
- L.E. Blaze Trophy - Kingswood Vs Wesley
