= Unofficial magistrate =

Judicial appointment in Sri Lanka

In Sri Lanka, a Justice of the Peace and Unofficial magistrate (also known as Acting magistrate) is a judicial appointment made by the Minister of Justice to a particular jurisdiction under the Judicature Act No 02 of 1978. An Unofficial magistrate is a senior Attorney at law (with 15 years or more practice), who is a Justice of the Peace and has the powers and authority vested in a Magistrate except the power to hear, try, or determine civil or criminal cases. Persons appointed as Unofficial magistrates may use the post-nominal JP, UM.

Commonly found in magistrate courts in remote areas where there are only one Magistrate and/or Additional Magistrate, it is a nominal position awarded to a senior lawyer of the court, who as the unofficial magistrate site on behalf of the magistrate in his/her absence and postpone hearings to a later date, grant bail and remand arrested suspects pending magisterial inquiry.

== History ==
The post was formally known as Justice of the Peace and Un-Official Police Magistrate (JP UPM) when the magistrate courts were known as police magistrate courts. Under the Ordinance No. 16 on 1865 section 28, unofficial magistrates had powers to appoint persons to the special police reserve, where requested to do by a Superintendent of Police or an Assistant Superintendent of Police. These powers were used during the 1915 riots.

== Municipalities ==
Under the provisions of the Municipal Councils Ordinance, the Mayor and Deputy Mayor of a Municipal Council are ex-official Justice of the Peace and Unofficial magistrate for the administrative district in which the Municipality is situated. This would be to cover the functions of the Municipal Magistrate Court in the absence of the Magistrate assigned to it.

== Criticism ==
Although unofficial magistrates have the power to grant bail, accusations have been made that certain lawyers presiding as unofficial magistrates have granted bail to their clients.

== Notable appointees ==
- Sir Razik Fareed, OBE, JP, UM
- Gate Mudaliyar Edmund Peiris, JP, UM
- Sam J.C.Kadirgamar Sr, JP, UM
- James Aubrey Martensz, CBE, JP, UM
- T. Rudra, JP, UM
- T.G. Gooneratne, JP, UM
- D. P. Atapattu, JP, UM

== See also ==
- Magistrate's Courts of Sri Lanka
- Unofficial Bar
