= Queen's Royal Irish Hussars =

The Queen's Royal Irish Hussars
- The Queen's Royal Irish Hussars regimental badge
- Active: 1958–1993
- Country: United Kingdom
- Branch: British Army
- Type: Royal Armoured Corps
- Role: Main Battle Tank
- Size: 550
- Regimental Headquarters: London
- Nickname: The Crossbelts
- Mottos: Mente et Manu (By Mind and Hand)
- March: The Queen's Royal Irish Hussars
- Anniversaries: Saint Patrick's Day, Balaclava Day

Commanders
- Colonel-in-Chief: Prince Philip, Duke of Edinburgh
- Colonel of the Regiment: Sir Winston Churchill; Lt Col George Kidston-Montgomerie DSO MC of Southannon; Air Marshall Sir John Baldwin; Major General John Strawson

The Queen's Royal Irish Hussars, abbreviated as QRIH, was a cavalry regiment of the British Army formed from the amalgamation of the 4th Queen's Own Hussars and the 8th King's Royal Irish Hussars in 1958. The regiment saw active service against insurgents in Aden; during the Indonesia–Malaysia confrontation and during the Gulf War, as well as regular service in West Germany as part of the British Army of the Rhine. The regiment was amalgamated with the Queen's Own Hussars to form the Queen's Royal Hussars on 1 September 1993.

== Early history ==
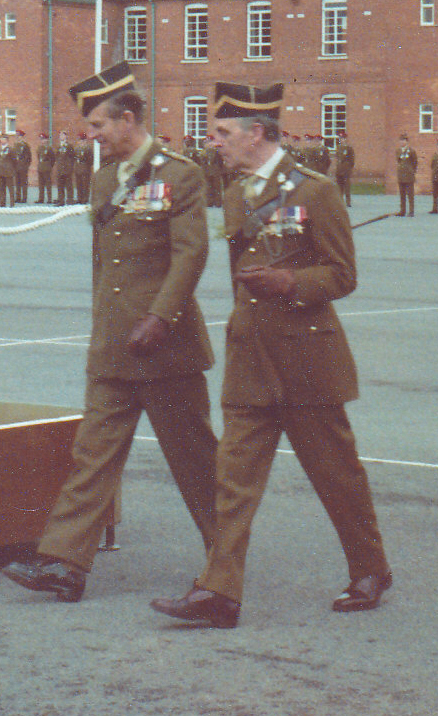
Prince Philip and Major General John Strawson. St Patrick's Day 1980, Bhurtpore Barracks, Tidworth. Both are wearing the Irish Hussar "Tent Hat".

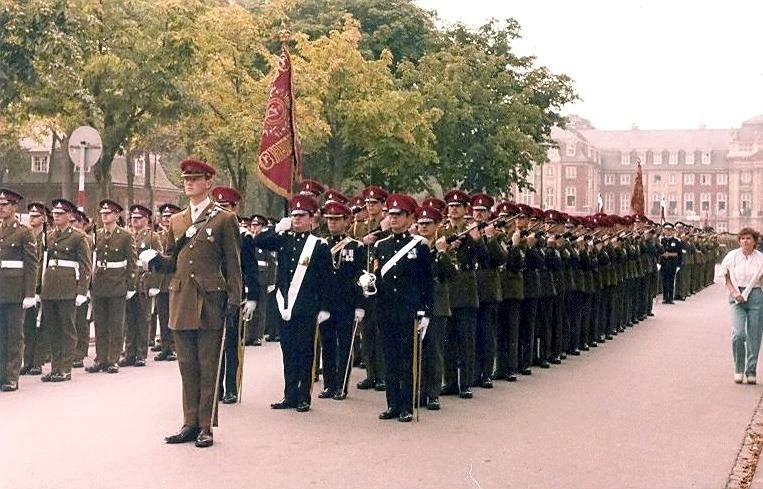
The Queen's Royal Irish Hussars guidon party and honour guard at the Freedom of Munster Parade, West Germany 1983

The regiment was formed from the amalgamation of the 4th Queen's Own Hussars and the 8th King's Royal Irish Hussars in Hohne, West Germany on 24 October 1958. The regiment remained at Caen Barracks in Hohne as an armoured car regiment for 7 Armoured Brigade Group until June 1961 when it returned to the United Kingdom. In October 1961 it sailed on the TS Oxfordshire to Aden, reroling as an armoured reconnaissance regiment and after serving there against insurgents for almost a year, it was air-trooped to the newly independent nation of Malaysia. It was based in Ipoh, Malaysia from October 1962, and saw limited action against Indonesian insurgents, seeing service in Brunei and Sarawak on jungle operations during the Indonesia–Malaysia confrontation. Soldiers from the regiment carried out searches for arms to prevent them falling into the hands of communist guerrillas; this included searching private houses.

Returning to West Germany in October 1964 the regiment became a recce unit based at Northampton Barracks in Wolfenbüttel. It moved to Perham Down in January 1968 and then transferred to Bovington Camp in September 1968 as RAC Centre regiment. It was re-roled as a tank regiment for 7th Armoured Brigade based at Barker Barracks in Paderborn in November 1970. From there it deployed a unit to Cyprus, as part of the UN peacekeeping force following the invasion of the northern part of the island by Turkey, in 1974.

The regiment moved to Bhurtpore Barracks at Tidworth Camp, as the reserve tank regiment, in July 1979 with a squadron detached to the School of Infantry at Warminster where it was used in the role of RAC Demonstration Squadron. It returned to West Germany as a tank regiment for 4th Armoured Brigade based at York Barracks in Munster in July 1982. From there it deployed to Northern Ireland as Prison Guard Force at the Maze Prison in 1983. Then in March 1988 half the regiment moved to Cambrai Barracks at Catterick Garrison as RAC Training Regiment while the other half moved to Bovington Camp as RAC Centre Regiment. It returned to West Germany as a tank regiment for 7th Armoured Brigade based at Wessex Barracks in Bad Fallingbostel in April 1990.

== Gulf War ==
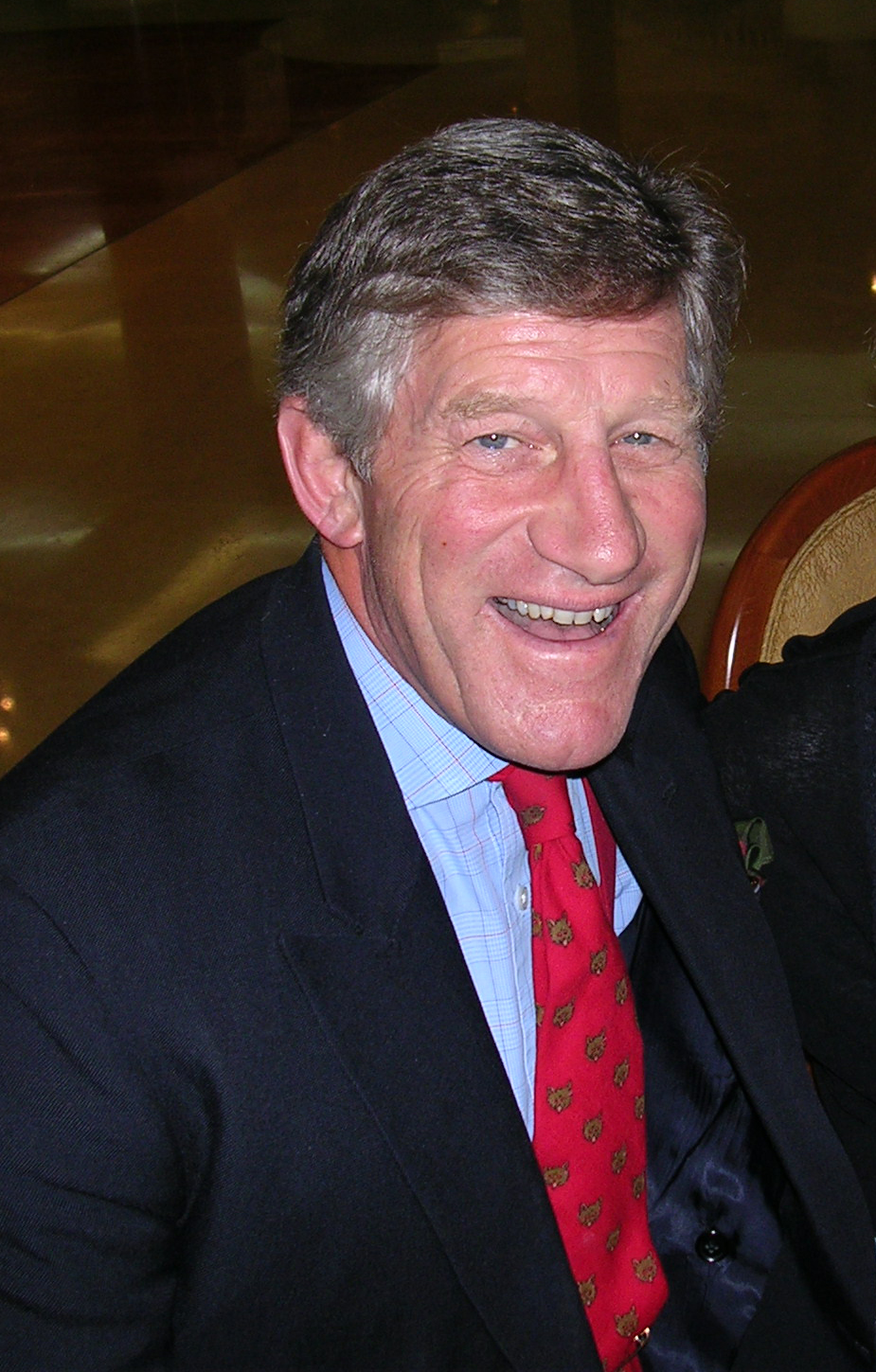
Lieutenant Colonel (now Major General) Arthur Denaro, Commanding Officer of the regiment in the Gulf War

Iraq invaded Kuwait on 2 August 1990. Prior to the war the regiment had just arrived in Fallingbostel as part of the 7th Armoured Brigade (under the command of Brigadier Patrick Cordingley), part of 1st (United Kingdom) Armoured Division, and was engaged in training on the Soltau-Lüneburg Training Area known to all as Soltau. The Colonel, Lieutenant Colonel Arthur Denaro was recovering from a polo accident four weeks earlier when he had broken his skull in four places requiring a metal plate to be inset but was still taking part in the exercise. The other regiments in the brigade had recently undergone intensive training at BATUS in Canada which the Hussars missed, having just arrived with the British Army of the Rhine.

The ensuing British deployment to the Gulf was codenamed Operation Granby. The ground phase of the Gulf War took place between 23/24–28 February 1991, was code named Operation Desert Storm by the U.S. Department of Defense.

The regiment trooped to the port city of Al Jubayl (scene of a later suspected chemical attack) and awaited the arrival of their 57 Challenger 1 tanks and other equipment. After the arrival of everything, grease had to be cleaned off, sand filters etc. fitted before the regiment made its way by tank transporter into the desert. After which training for the forthcoming combat began. At one point depleted uranium ammunition was issued at the rate of five rounds per tank. During one training day 14 of the 57 tanks broke down causing serious concerns for Colonel Denaro.

The Iraqi army knew the regiment was coming. Air bombardment and media interest ensured that they were well warned. Tanks and artillery were dug in across a wide front to provide a warm reception for the allies from the world's fourth largest army. Casualty figures were predicted to be as high as 15000 for the allies, even General Schwarzkopf, the allied commander of land forces, estimated 5000.

H Hour was at 0300hrs on 24 February 1991: (G Day). The regiment was given the order to cross the start line at 0315hrs. With helicopters providing reconnaissance the tanks advanced to contact at speed. The first contact was not until 1628hrs when an Iraqi trench position was engaged with machine gun fire before surrendering.

On G+2 reports of a counterattack began to arrive at brigade headquarters. D Squadron under Captain (Acting Major) Toby Madison picked up fourteen thermal image contacts at maximum range and engaged. The battle went on for 90 minutes. Madison received the Military Cross for his command of the squadron in this action. The Iraqis were at a severe disadvantage as they had no night vision capability and were out-ranged by the British tanks with their thermal gunnery sights and superior tank guns. Captain Tim Purbrick commanding 4th Troop described firing Sabot round at an Iraqi T55 tank, "Our second round entered its glacis plate and exited through the gearbox at the rear, igniting its ammunition and destroying the tank at a range of three thousand six hundred metres." Also, on 26 February 1991, a British Army Challenger 1 scored the longest tank-to-tank 'kill' in military history, when it destroyed an Iraqi T-55 at a range of 4.7 km (2.9 miles) with an APDS round.

Large numbers of prisoners were now surrendering to the regiment. They were passed rearwards to Regimental sergeant major Johnny Muir's party who did their best to feed them and keep them safe. Rations were limited; however as no-one had considered that an armoured unit would have to deal with prisoners, often the food supplied was not as nourishing as that provided to the troops. Items such as oatmeal biscuits, which were effectively left overs from ration packs, were given along with water. One Iraqi medical officer expressed concern that he and his fellow prisoners were going to be shot. The RSM assured him that "we are not barbarians".

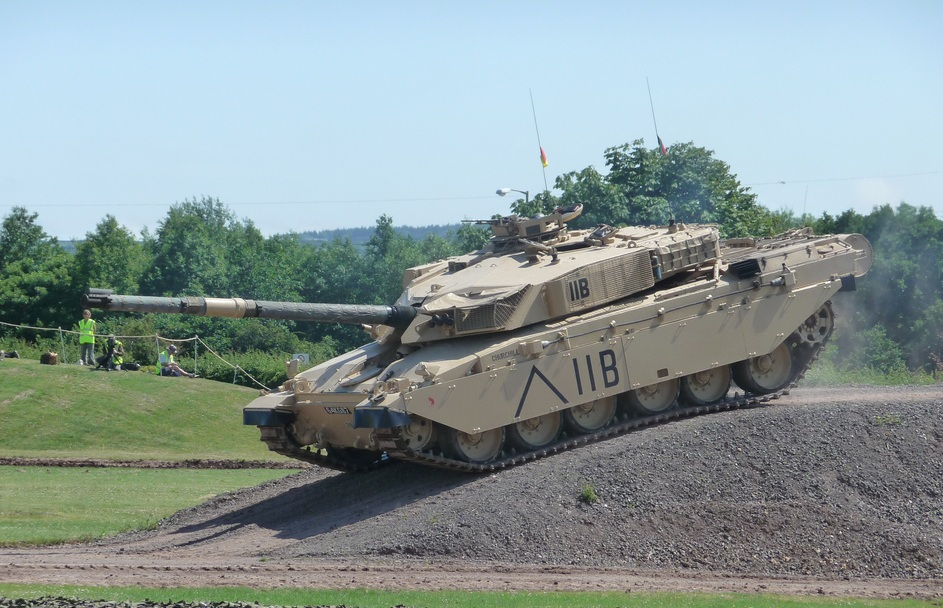
Colonel Denaro's tank "Churchill" is now preserved at the Tank Museum, Bovington.

The regiment continued its advance, destroying all in its path until it arrived at the map line "Platinum" at which point a halt was called for sleep for the first time in 48 hours. On G+3 the regiment resumed its advance in the company of the Royal Scots Dragoon Guards, the other armoured regiment in 7th Armoured Brigade. The regiment entered Kuwait through Wadi al-Batin. After fifteen kilometres travel recce troop stopped to collect prisoners and were fired up by two U.S. Abrams tanks, wounding Corporal Lynch and Corporal Balmforth, following this up by engaging Command Troop as it passed by.

Following the blue on blue incident Brigadier Cordingly ordered all vehicles to fly flags, banners or anything they could lay their hands on to show they were friendly. He felt the campaign was coming to a close and that vehicles from all nationalities were roaming everywhere and that this would lead to more friendly fire incidents. The Irish Hussars did not disappoint. Union flags and Ulster Banners quickly appeared. Colonel Denaro, a Roman Catholic from Donegal, led the advance into Kuwait from that point onwards with an Ulster flag supplied by his Northern Ireland Protestant crew fluttering from one of his tank's antennae.

The regiment was then tasked on G+4 to take possession of the Basra to Kuwait City highway to prevent retreating Iraqi forces from escaping. This was done by 0800hrs. The ceasefire was then announced so the regiment went firm and started putting up bivouacs and tents. As the regiment left the area heading back to Al Jubayl for "de-bombing" the Regimental Sergeant Major was stopped by some civilians who said, "Thank you for giving us back our country", which seemed to him to be a fitting end to the deployment. The regiment lost no casualties, no tanks were disabled or knocked out by enemy fire, and it took part in the destruction of over three hundred Iraqi tanks in a four-day period. Colonel Denaro's Challenger 1 tank named "Churchill" is now preserved at The Tank Museum, Bovington with the list of its crew, Corporal John Nutt, Corporal Gerry McKenna and Trooper Les Hawkes.

== Regimental museum ==
The regimental collection is based at Eastbourne Redoubt in Sussex. It is moving to a new facility in Warwick known as "Trinity Mews": it is due to open in 2022.

== Amalgamation ==
The regiment was amalgamated with the Queen's Own Hussars to form the Queen's Royal Hussars on 2 September 1993.

== Commanding Officers ==
The Commanding Officers have been:

- 1958–1960: Lt.-Col. W. George O. Butler
- 1960–1963: Lt.-Col. H. Timothy Pierson
- 1963–1965: Lt.-Col. John M. Strawson
- 1965–1968: Lt.-Col. John T. Paley
- 1968–1970: Lt.-Col. G. Kenneth Bidie
- 1970–1972: Lt.-Col. Christopher D. B. Troughton
- 1972–1974: Lt.-Col. Brian R. O’Rorke
- 1974–1976: Lt.-Col. Brian L. G. Kenny
- 1976–1979: Lt.-Col. Richard S. Webster
- 1979–1981: Lt.-Col. Robin J. Rhoderick-Jones
- 1981–1984: Lt.-Col. Richard E. Barron
- 1984–1986: Lt.-Col. Stephen R. Daniell
- 1986–1989: Lt.-Col. Sir Charles D. Lowther, 4th Baronet
- 1989–1991: Lt.-Col. Arthur G. Denaro
- 1991–1993: Lt.-Col. Andrew N. Bellamy

== Colonels ==
The regiment's colonels were:

- 1958-1965 Colonel Sir Winston Churchill
- 1965-1969 Lieutenant-Colonel George Jardine Kidston-Montgomerie of Southannan
- 1969-1974 General Sir John Hackett
- 1974-1975 Colonel Richard Warren-Piper, MC
- 1975-1985 Major-General John Strawson
- 1985-1991 General Sir Brian Kenny

The first Colonel was Sir Winston Churchill: after his death in 1965 Cornets from the Regiment stood vigil over his catafalque in Westminster and carried his coffin to the funeral train and to the graveside. Prince Philip was colonel-in-chief throughout the life of the regiment.

== Battle honours ==
There is a combined total of 538 years service from the formation of the parent regiments until the amalgamation which was to create the QRIH. During this time 102 battle honours were awarded to the regiments. 40 of these appeared on the QRIH guidon as shown in the table below.

Guidon of the QRIH emblazoned with 40 battle honours.

4th Hussar	To both regiments	8th Hussar
Dettigen (1743)	Alma (1854)	Leswaree (1803)
Talavera (1809)	Balaklava (1854)	Hindoostan (1802–1822)
Albuhera (1811)	Inkerman (1854)	Central India (1857–58)
Salamanca (1812)	Sevastopol (1855)	Afghanistan (1879–80)
Vittoria (1814)	Mons (1914–18)	South Africa (1900–02)
Toulouse (1814)	Somme (1916–18)	Givenchy (1914)
Peninsular (1809–14)	Cambrai (1917–18)	Albert (1918)
Ghuznee (1839)	Amiens (1918)	Bapaume (1918)
Afghanistan (1839)	France & Flanders (1914–18)	Villers Bocage (1944)
Marne (1914)	Alam el Halfa (1942)	Rhine (1945)
Ypres (1914–15)	Gazala (1942)	Roer (1945)
Proasteion (1941)	El Alamein (1942)	Imjin (1951)
Greece (1941)	North Africa (1940–42)	Korea (1951)
Coriano (1944)

== Traditions ==
Stable Belt Colours

Cover of "Crossbelts", the regimental journal.

The regimental journal, a magazine of approximately 150 pages per issue published annually, was called Crossbelts.

On Saint Patrick's Day and Balaclava Day the non-commissioned officers would serve Gunfire (a mixture of tea and rum) to junior soldiers as a morning wake-up drink.

== Affiliations ==
The Irish Hussars maintained affiliations with territorial and allied units.

- British Army D (North Irish Horse) Squadron the Royal Yeomanry (now B Sqn Scottish and North Irish Yeomanry)
- Canada The Royal Canadian Hussars (Montreal)
- Canada 8th Canadian Hussars (Princess Louise's Own)
- Australia 2nd/14th Light Horse Regiment (Queensland Mounted Infantry)
- Australia 8/13th Victorian Mounted Rifles
- Australia 3rd Battalion the Royal Australian Regiment
- (Belgium) 2nd Belgian Lancers
- (Germany) Panzer Battalion 202
- (France) 7eme Regiment de Chasseurs

== Sources ==
- McManners, Hugh (2010). Gulf War One: Real Voices From the Front Line. Ebury Publishing. ISBN 978-0091935986.
