= John Cox (Royal Navy officer, born 1928) =

Royal Navy Vice Admiral (1928–2006)

Vice-Admiral Sir John Cox KCB
- Born: 27 October 1928; Peking, China
- Died: 3 October 2006 (aged 77)
- Military career
- Allegiance: United Kingdom
- Branch: Royal Navy
- Service years: 1946–83
- Rank: Vice-Admiral
- Commands: Naval Aviation Command; Third Flotilla; HMS Norfolk; HMS Naiad; HMS Thames; HMS Stubbington; HMS Dilston
- Conflicts: Cyprus Emergency; Cod Wars
- Awards: Knight Commander of the Order of the Bath; Mentioned in Despatches
- Other work: Wormwood Scrubs parole board The Spastics Society

Vice-Admiral Sir John Michael Holland Cox, KCB (27 October 1928 – 3 October 2006) was a senior officer in the Royal Navy.

== Personal life ==
He was born in Peking, China and first went to sea as a boy (in a small rowboat), when he warned the British fleet of the seizure of British Embassy property by pirates. This resulted in him receiving two reprimands for putting to sea without telling anyone where he was going — one from the Commander-in-Chief, China Station; the other from his mother.

Cox married Anne Folkstone in 1962, and had a son, James a daughter, Alexandra and two stepsons. Lady Cox died in 2020.

== Naval career ==
As a British sailor, he was an influential figure, rising to numerous staff and sea commands, including Flag Officer Third Flotilla/Commander Anti-Submarine Warfare Group Two, responsible for the aircraft carriers and amphibious ships, although superseded by Sandy Woodward for the Falklands War, since he was about to retire at the time, and was on gardening leave. For his actions in preparing the fleet, he was appointed a Knight Commander of the Order of the Bath in the 1982 Birthday Honours. Prior to the peak of his career, he was appointed to other notable commands, first commanding the minesweeper HMS Dilston, where he was mentioned in despatches for reducing smuggling off Cyprus in 1952. He later commanded the minesweepers HMS Stubbington, Royal Navy Reserve HMS Thames, the frigate HMS Naiad and the guided missile destroyer HMS Norfolk. He was appointed Director of Naval Operations and Trade under the Ministry of Defence Naval Staff from July 1974 to April 1976. He later became Flag Officer Naval Air Command from May 1982 to September 1983; and retired from the navy on 16 December 1983.

== Diplomatic career ==
As a Naval attaché, Cox was appointed to West Germany, where his technique of approaching Soviet Navy Officers "sailor-to-sailor" enabled him to learn intelligence while playing tennis.

== Post-Naval career ==
After retirement from the Royal Navy, Cox turned his attention towards working with the disabled, including the Spastics Society, which he helped turn into Scope which led to the Disability Discrimination Act 1995. He was also on the parole board for HM Prison Wormwood Scrubs along with his wife.
