= Fleet captain =

Historic military title

Fleet captain is a historic naval officer title. In the United States it was bestowed upon a naval officer who served as chief of staff to a flag officer. In the United Kingdom, a captain of the fleet could be appointed to assist an admiral when the admiral had ten or more ships to command.

== Historical background ==
In the Royal Navy, during the 18th and 19th centuries, an admiral's flagship might have a captain of the fleet, who would be ranked between the admiral and the ship's captain (or "flag captain"). The "captain of the fleet" would be listed as the ship's "first captain" and would serve as the admiral's chief-of staff.

Captain of the fleet was a post rather than a rank in itself, and if its holder's permanent rank was below that of an admiral then he ranked just below the most junior rear-admiral and was entitled to the pay and allowance of a rear-admiral whilst he held the post. The admiral's commands would be issued through his captain of the fleet, and the fleet's responses would be passed back to him. This role of intermediary between the overall commander and the commanded was analogous to that of a commander on a large warship, through whom orders were relayed to the crew and responses received. He would also act in some senses and instances as the admiral's chief of staff.

A captain of the fleet would usually be stationed on the admiral's flagship as its "first captain", and so that ship would also have a flag captain or "second captain" for everyday command of the ship itself.

The United States Navy had a similar position in the 19th century, but used the title "fleet captain" instead of "captain of the fleet." The fleet captain was not always actually a captain in rank. For instance, Henry H. Bell was a commander when he served as David G. Farragut's fleet captain in the Civil War. In 1869 the Secretary of the Navy ordered that the title of fleet captain be changed to "chief of staff."

Much later, in 1950–52, then Captain Hilary Biggs was Captain of the Fleet, Home Fleet, afterwards being promoted to rear-admiral and finishing his career as a vice-admiral.

== See also ==
- Senior captain
- Senior colonel
