= John Strawson (British Army officer) =

British Army general

Major-General John Strawson CB OBE
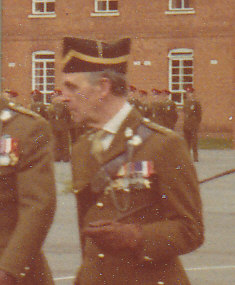
- Strawson as colonel of the Queen's Royal Irish Hussars
- Born: 1 January 1921; Ealing
- Died: 21 February 2014 (aged 93); Salisbury, England
- Military career
- Allegiance: United Kingdom
- Branch: British Army
- Service years: 1939–
- Rank: Major-General
- Nickname: General John
- Commands: 4th Queen's Own Hussars; Queen's Royal Irish Hussars; 39 Infantry Brigade; Chief of Staff, UKLF
- Conflicts: Battle of Greece; Operation Crusader; Operation Overlord; Italian Campaign (World War II)
- Awards: CBE; US Bronze Star
- Other work: Author

Major-General John Strawson CB OBE (1 January 1921 – 21 February 2014) was a British Army officer, best known for his service during the Second World War in the Middle East and Italy, and afterwards in Germany and Malaya. Following the amalgamation of the 4th and 8th Hussars as The Queen's Royal Irish Hussars, he commanded the regiment in Malaysia and Germany. For his leadership during the Borneo campaign he was awarded the O.B.E.

Later he commanded at brigade level and was Chief of Staff, United Kingdom Land Forces. For this latter service he was awarded a C.B. in the 1975 New Year Honours. He had previously been awarded the US Bronze Star for his leadership during the Italian campaign of 1944–45. In civilian life he became a prolific author, especially on military matters.

== Early life ==
John Strawson was born in Ealing in 1921. His father was the headmaster of an East London secondary school whose health was ruined by four years of service on the Western Front during the Great War. He died prematurely in 1936, leaving Strawson, his brothers Galen and Peter and sister Margaret in impoverished circumstances. Unlike Peter, who successfully achieved a bursary to St John's College, Oxford, and went on to become one of the most famous philosophers of Britain, John was obliged to join the Civil Service, leaving to join the army at the outbreak of hostilities in 1939.

== Army career ==
Strawson was commissioned into the 4th Queen's Own Hussars as a cornet in 1942 and joined the regiment at Kokini Trimithia, near Nicosia, where it was temporarily out of the line for refit. He joined the 4th Hussars at a time when most of its officers had been captured by the Germans during the ill-fated Greek campaign. The regiment had been overrun and forced to surrender with only a small number escaping. As a result, many of his brother officers were drafted in from other cavalry regiments.

On returning to Egypt, the regiment was stationed at Beni Yusef camp in Cairo in the region of Mena, beside the pyramids. Despite the exigencies of war, Strawson writes fondly of being able to enjoy such pursuits as "polo, golf, tennis, squash, swimming and poodle faking".

== Command ==
On promotion to lieutenant colonel, Strawson assumed command of the Queen's Royal Irish Hussars, into which his own regiment, the 4th Queen's Own Hussars, had been amalgamated. He took the QRIH through the Malayan Campaign, peacetime in Germany and a further tour in Borneo, where he was appointed OBE in recognition of his leadership.

== Civilian life ==
After retiring from the Army, Strawson wrote a number of books of military history and biography, including studies of the British Army. He collaborated with General Sir John Hackett and others in writing the two fictional volumes of The Third World War (1978 & 1982). His later books include: The Battle For Italy (1987), Gentlemen in Khaki: The British Army 1890-1990 (1989), The Duke and the Emperor: Wellington and Napoleon (1994) and Churchill and Hitler: In Victory and Defeat (1997).

To the end of his life he continued to attend a variety of events in support of the British Army and, in particular, of the Old Comrades Association of the Queen's Royal Hussars, where he was known to all as "General John".

== Family ==
Strawson married Baroness Wilfriede von Schellersheim in Eisbergen during 1960. They lived in Chitterne, Wiltshire. They had two married daughters. His elder brother was the Oxford philosopher, Sir Peter Strawson and his nephew is British philosopher and literary critic Galen John Strawson.
