= HMS Liverpool (D92) =

Destroyer of the Royal Navy

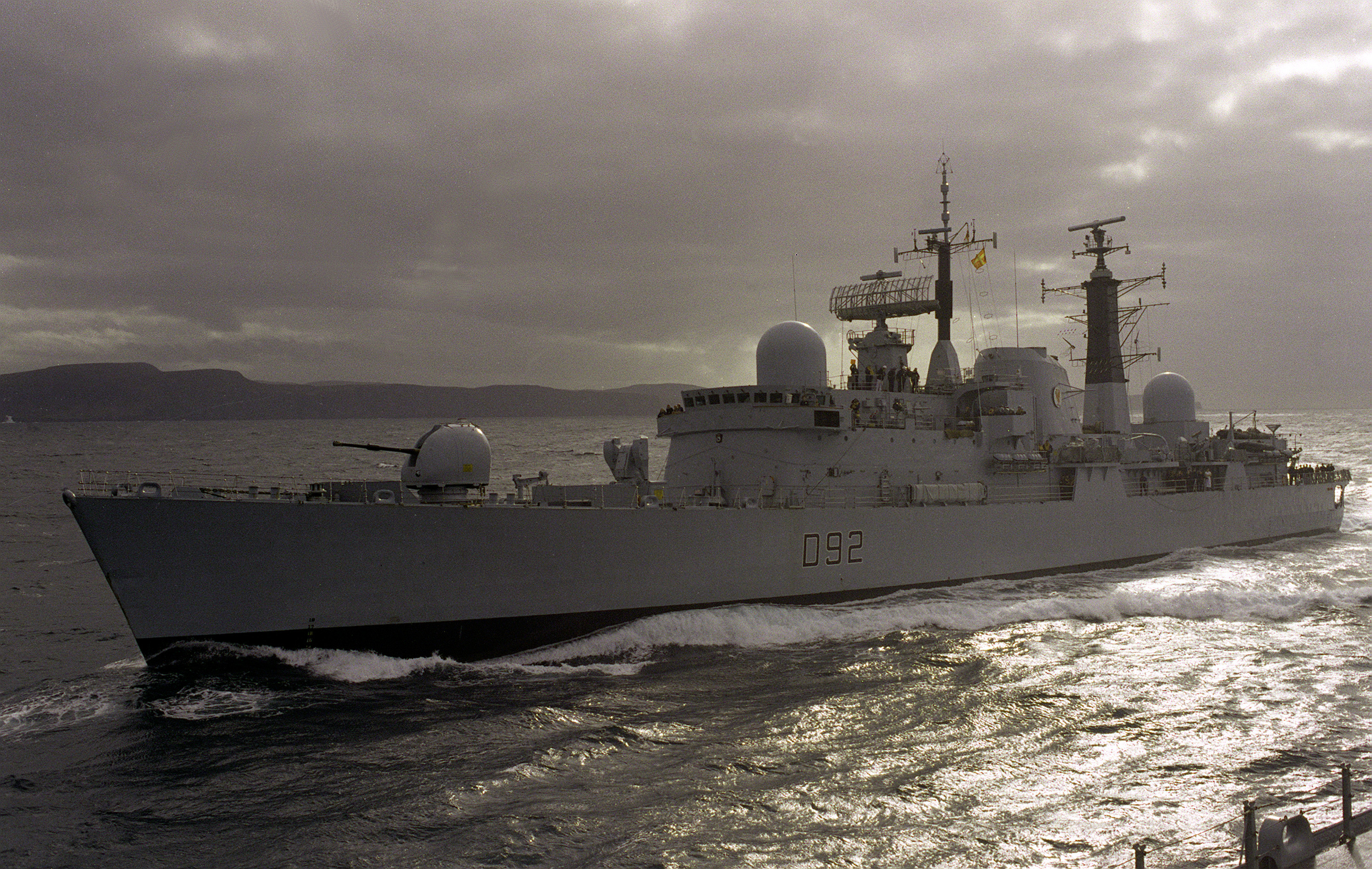
- Liverpool off Cape Wrath, Scotland, August 1986

History

United Kingdom
- Name: HMS Liverpool
- Ordered: 1 March 1977
- Builder: Cammell Laird
- Laid down: 5 July 1978
- Launched: 25 September 1980
- Sponsored by: Lady Strathcona, wife of Euan Howard, 4th Baron Strathcona and Mount Royal
- Commissioned: 1 July 1982
- Decommissioned: 30 March 2012
- Identification: Pennant number: D92; IMO number: 4907062; Callsign: GZIS
- Nickname(s): "Crazy Red Chicken"
- Fate: Scrapped October 2014
- Badge

General characteristics
- Class & type: Type 42 destroyer
- Displacement: 4,820 t (4,740 long tons)
- Length: 125 m (410 ft)
- Beam: 14.3 m (47 ft)
- Propulsion: COGOG (Combined Gas or Gas) turbines, 2 shafts; 2 turbines producing 36 MW (48,000 hp)
- Speed: 30 knots (56 km/h; 35 mph)
- Complement: 287
- Armament: 1 × Twin Sea Dart missile launcher (total of 22 missiles); 1 × 4.5 inch (114 mm) Mk 8 gun; 2 × 20 mm Oerlikon guns; 2 × Vulcan Phalanx Close-in weapon system (CIWS); 2 × Triple anti-submarine torpedo tubes; NATO Seagnat and DLF3 Decoy Launchers
- Aircraft carried: 1 x Lynx HMA8; Armed with; 4 × anti ship missiles; 2 × anti submarine torpedoes

HMS Liverpool was a Type 42-class guided missile destroyer of the Royal Navy. She was built by Cammell Laird in Birkenhead and launched on 25 September 1980 by Lady Strathcona, wife of Euan Howard, the then Minister of State for Defence. Liverpool was the last Type 42 Batch 2 in service.

== Operational history ==
=== 1982–1990 ===
Liverpool was commissioned into the Royal Navy in April 1982 and after an accelerated trials period, prepared to sail for the South Atlantic in early June 1982. However, the Falklands War was won before she sailed and she became a trial ship for the many enhancements developed through combat experience. Liverpool therefore did not see active service in the Falklands conflict, but she remained on station for the next six months before returning to the UK in Spring 1983. In 1987 Liverpool was off the north coast of Russia monitoring and data collecting Soviet naval missile and weapons firings. 1988 saw Liverpool undertake a DED in Rosyth, when she was fitted with the Phalanx weapons system. 1989 saw her deploy to the Persian Gulf for Operation Armilla, as she did again 1990 and 1993. There then followed a period with the NATO standing force in the Mediterranean.

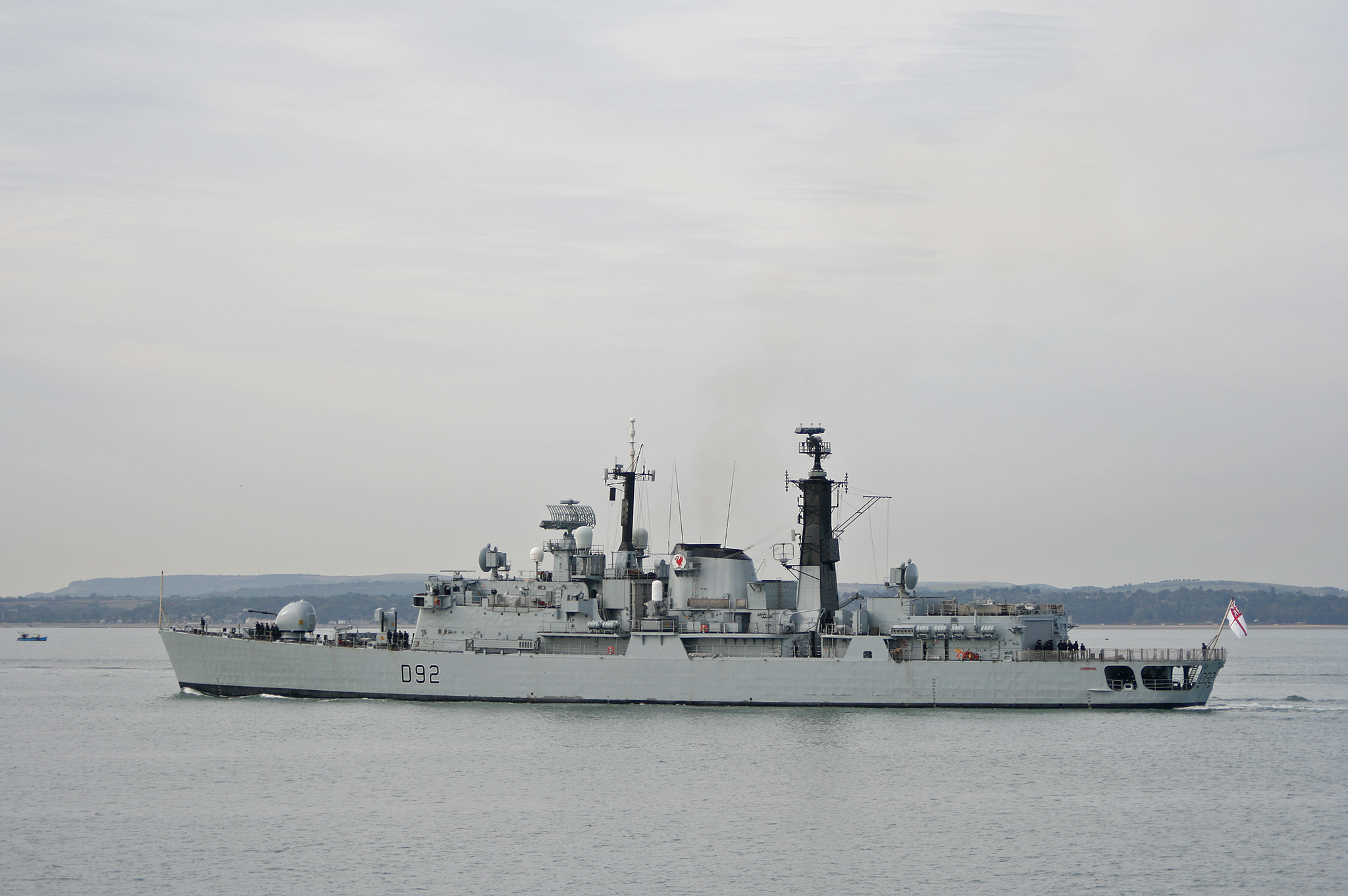
Liverpool departing from Portsmouth Naval Base, 21 September 2009.

=== 1991–2000 ===
After the eruption of the Soufriere Hills Volcano in 1995, the destroyer played a vital role in the evacuation of Montserrations to nearby islands as part of an effort which saw 7,000 people leave the island for places such as Antigua and Barbuda (a 30-mile (48 km) distance, which was impossible by aircraft at the time due to the destruction of the Blackburne international airport). In 1997 and 1998 she was commanded by Captain David Snelson and then by Captain Philip Wilcocks until 1999.

=== 2001–2010 ===
Liverpool fired what is believed to be the first salvo of Sea Dart missiles in well over a decade. The firing took place approximately 250 miles (400 km) south-west of the Isles of Scilly on 8 September 2002, against a sea skimming target to demonstrate the effectiveness of the Sea Dart missile and Liverpool's systems following a 12-month refit at Rosyth Dockyard.

She was part of Naval Task Group 03 (NTG03), intended to take part in exercises in the far east as part of the Five Power Defence Arrangement. The task force was, instead, sent to the Persian Gulf where it took part in the 2003 Iraq War.

In 2005, Liverpool was sent to the Caribbean, where her duties included patrols to crack down on drug smuggling. In 2008, 18 sailors onboard tested positive for cocaine in a routine drug test.

She entered refit in 2009. On returning to service in 2010, Liverpool acted as an escort to fleet flagship Ark Royal's task group during a four-month deployment to the United States and Canada as part of Exercise Auriga.

=== 2011–2012 ===
In late March 2011, Liverpool was ordered to the Mediterranean to relieve Type 22 frigate Cumberland as the Royal Navy's contribution to Operation Unified Protector, NATO's naval blockade of Libya during the country's civil war.

On 18 April, she intercepted the vessel MV Setubal Express heading for Tripoli, conducting a boarding party search with her own boarding party and finding trucks of potential use to the Gaddafi regime. The merchant vessel was ordered to divert to Salerno in Italy.

On 12 May 2011, while engaged in surveillance operations off the coast of the rebel-held Libyan city of Misrata, Liverpool came under fire from a shore battery, making her the first Royal Navy warship to be deliberately targeted since the Falklands War. Liverpool had been tasked with other NATO warships, to intercept small, high-speed inflatable craft spotted approaching the port of Misrata, the type which had been used previously to lay mines in the Port of Misrata. Libyan rocket artillery on the coast fired an inaccurate salvo of rockets at Liverpool. Liverpool returned fire with her 4.5 inch main gun, silencing the shore battery, in the Royal Navy's first use of the weapon since the 2003 invasion of Iraq.

On 28 June 2011, Liverpool used her main gun to fire warning shots at pro-Gaddafi maritime forces moving along Libya's Mediterranean coast just west of the city of Misrata, amid concerns a threat was posed to civilians due to recent repeated attempts to mine the harbour. After initially ignoring the first shell, a further three were fired and the vessels were forced to return to their port of departure.

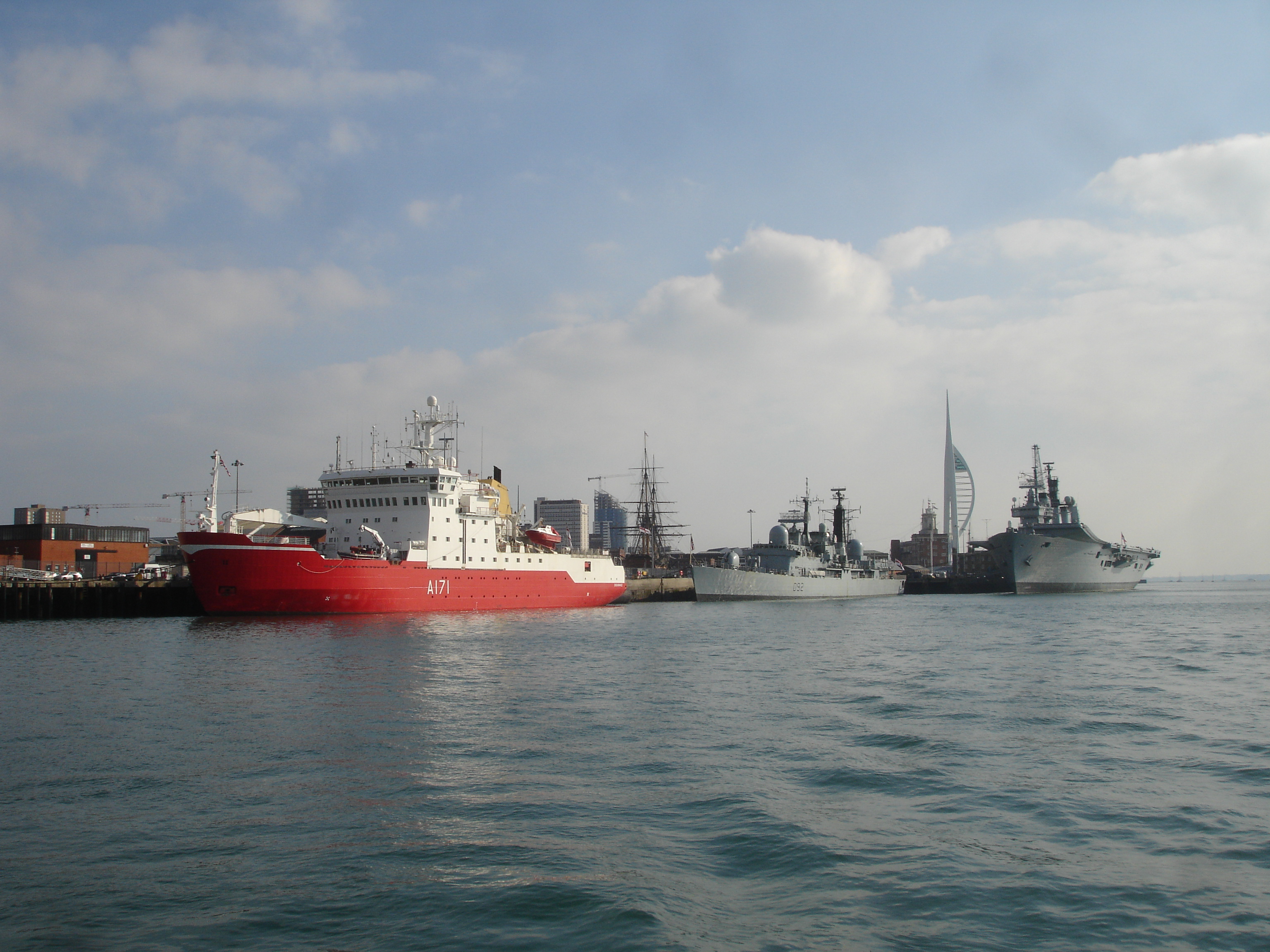
Liverpool berthed adjacent to Endurance, historic ship of the line Victory and the aircraft carrier Ark Royal.

On the morning of 3 August 2011, several rockets were fired at Liverpool. She returned fire with her 4.5 inch main gun. The attack came after the ship had fired a barrage of illumination rounds in support of an air attack on the stronghold of Zliten.

On 16 August 2011, Liverpool was involved in the most intense shore-bombardment of the war. Liverpool had been tasked by a patrol aircraft to fire illumination rounds over the city of Zlitan. While conducting this mission, Liverpool came under fire from a Loyalist shore battery. Liverpool responded by firing three rounds from her 4.5 inch gun, silencing the battery. Later on the same day, a patrol aircraft spotted a large pro-Gaddafi vehicle convoy carrying weapons and ammunition. Liverpool fired 54 shells from her 4.5 inch gun at the convoy, destroying or severely damaging many of the vehicles. During the ensuing chaos on the ground, NATO aircraft destroyed the remainder of the convoy.

Liverpool returned from Operation Unified Protector on 7 November 2011, entering Portsmouth Harbour after more than seven months of operations off Libya. She had fired over 200 rounds from her main gun during the conflict.

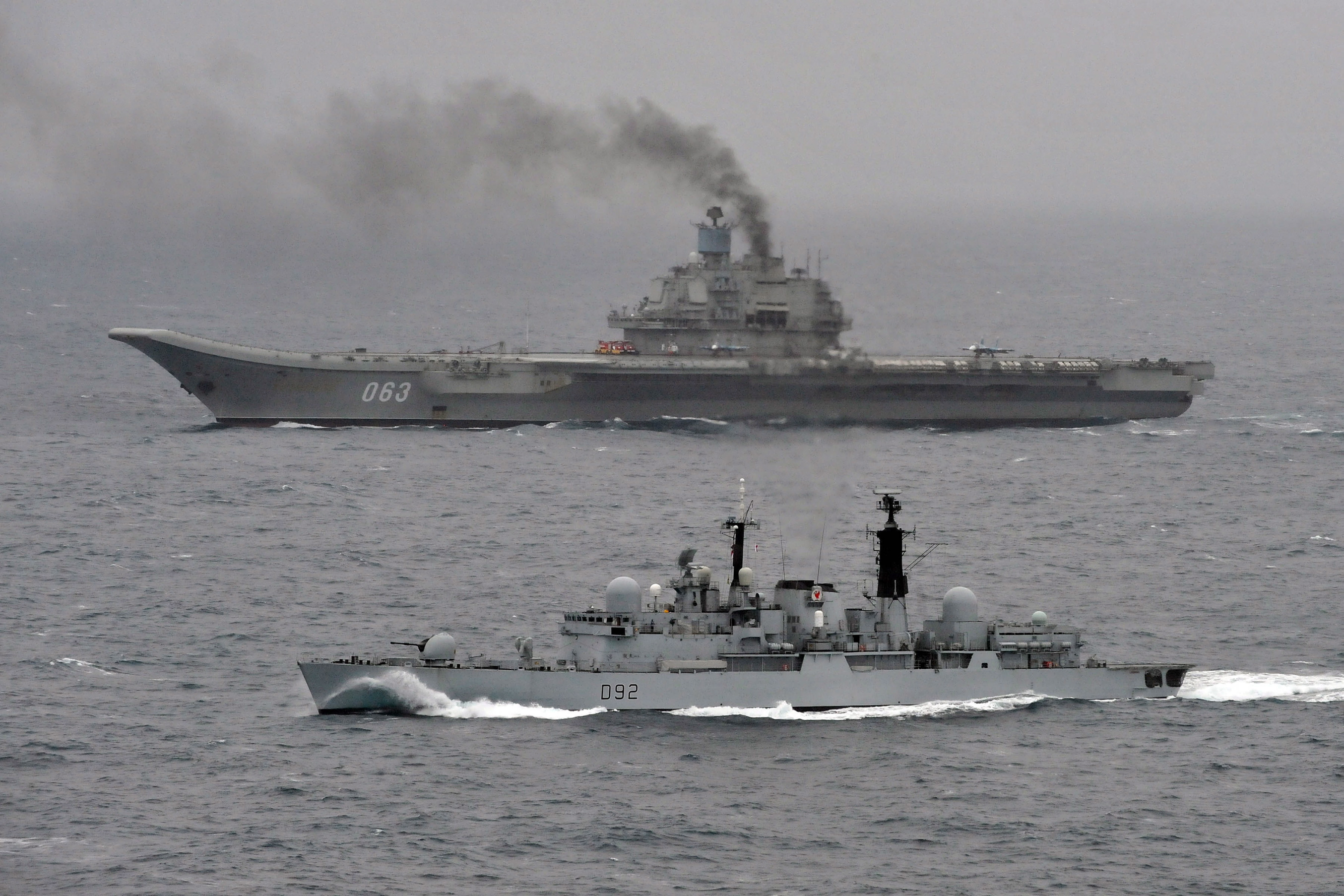
Liverpool escorting the Russian aircraft carrier Admiral Kuznetsov in 2012

On 7 February 2012 Liverpool escorted a Russian task group centred on the aircraft carrier Admiral Kuznetsov from the Channel, off south-west England, to the seas off south-west Ireland. The task group of two warships and five support ships were making their way home to the Northern and Baltic Fleets of the Russian Navy.

In March 2012 Liverpool took part in Exercise Cold Response, a NATO winter war games exercise being conducted in northern Norway, where she acted as an escort to the helicopter carrier HMS Illustrious and the amphibious assault ship HMS Bulwark.

The ship made her final visit to the city of Liverpool on 29 February 2012 where on Saturday 3 March and Sunday 4 March 2012, the general public were invited on deck to look around the ship.

She was formally decommissioned on 30 March 2012. Her Mk 8, 4.5 inch deck gun is on display at the Explosion Museum of Naval Firepower in Gosport, Hampshire, England.

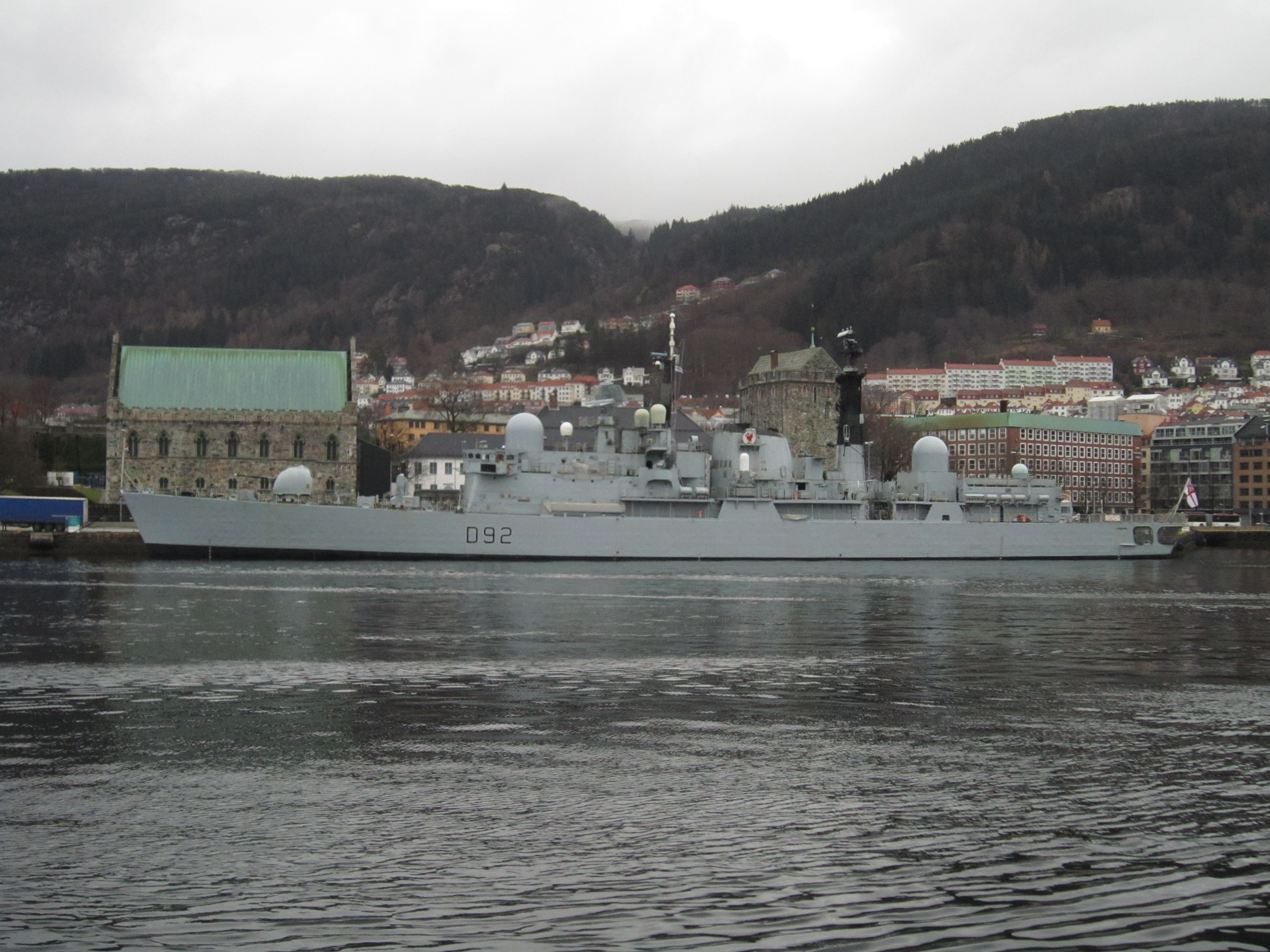
HMS Liverpool berthed in Bergen Harbour on 23 March 2012

== Affiliations ==
- The City of Liverpool
- The Worshipful Company of Pewterers
- Liverpool University Royal Naval Unit (HMS Charger)
- British Army
  - 47 (Air Defence) Regiment Royal Artillery
  - The Duke of Lancaster's Regiment (King's, Lancashire and Border)
- Combined Cadet Force (Royal Navy) Units
  - Calday Grange Grammar School, Wirral
  - Merchant Taylors' School, Crosby
  - Birkenhead School, Wirral
- Sea Cadet Corps (United Kingdom) Units
  - TS Mersey (City of Liverpool Sea Cadets)
  - TS Liverpool (West Derby Sea Cadets)
  - TS Daring (Kirkby & Liverpool North Sea Cadets & Royal Marines Cadets)
