= Hilary Biggs =

Royal Navy Vice Admiral (1905–1976)

Vice-Admiral Sir Hilary Biggs KBE CB DSO & Bar
- Born: 15 January 1905
- Died: 2 January 1976 (aged 70)
- Military career
- Allegiance: United Kingdom
- Branch: Royal Navy
- Service years: 1923–1958
- Rank: Vice-Admiral
- Commands: East Indies Station (1956–58); HMS Royal Arthur (1946–48); 11th Destroyer Flotilla (1944–45); HMS Rotherham (1944–45); HMS Hero (1940–42)
- Conflicts: Second World War: Second Battle of Narvik; Battle of Greece; Battle of Crete
- Awards: Knight Commander of the Order of the British Empire; Companion of the Order of the Bath; Distinguished Service Order & Bar; Mentioned in Despatches; War Cross, 3rd Class (Greece); Cross of Valour (Poland)
- Other work: Vice Admiral Sir Geoffrey Biggs (son)

Vice-Admiral Sir Hilary Worthington Biggs, KBE, CB, DSO & Bar (15 January 1905 – 2 January 1976) was a senior Royal Navy officer.

== Naval career ==
Hilary Worthington Biggs was born on 15 January 1905, the son of Lieutenant Colonel C. W. Biggs. After attending the Royal Naval Colleges at Osborne and Dartmouth, Biggs was commissioned into the Royal Navy in 1923, as a midshipman to HMS Hood. After several promotions in the 1920s, Biggs became a lieutenant commander in 1934 and a commander four years later.

After the outbreak of the Second World War, Biggs was posted as commander of HMS Hero in 1940; he received the Distinguished Service Order (DSO) that year for his services in the Second Battle of Narvik, and was awarded a Bar to the DSO for his role in the evacuation of Greece the following year. He was also awarded the War Cross, 3rd Class from Greece and Poland's Cross of Valour in 1942. Biggs then served in the Battle of Crete, before being posted to the Admiralty as Deputy Naval Assistant to the Second Sea Lord (1942–44). He was promoted to captain in 1943, and commanded HMS Rotherham from 1944 (he was also Captain (D), 11th Destroyer Flotilla of the Eastern Fleet), serving in the Indian Ocean.

With the Second World War over, Biggs commanded HMS Royal Arthur (1946–48) and served as Assistant Chief of Supplies at the Admiralty. He was Captain of the Fleet on the Home Fleet from 1950 to 1952, and the next year became rear admiral and Deputy Chief of Naval Personnel (Personal Services). In 1955, he became Flag Officer of the Home Fleet Training Squadron and then, from 1956 to 1958 was posted as the last Commander-in-Chief of the East Indies Station.

Biggs was appointed a Companion of the Order of the Bath in 1955 and, three years later, he was appointed Knight Commander of the Order of the British Empire. He died on 2 January 1976, leaving a widow (Florence, daughter of Sir Roger Backhouse) and four children. One of his sons was Vice Admiral Sir Geoffrey Biggs (1938–2002).

Military offices
Preceded by Sir Charles Norris	Commander-in-Chief, East Indies Station; 1956–1958	Post disbanded
