= Geoffrey Biggs =

Vice Admiral Sir Geoffrey Biggs KCB
- Born: 23 November 1938
- Died: 29 June 2002 (aged 63)
- Relatives: Vice Admiral Sir Hilary Biggs (father); Admiral of the Fleet Sir Roger Backhouse (grandfather)
- Military career
- Allegiance: United Kingdom
- Branch: Royal Navy
- Service years: 1958–1995
- Rank: Vice Admiral
- Commands: Flag Officer Gibraltar; Naval Staff Directorate; Directorate of Naval Operations and Trade; 2nd Frigate Squadron; HMS Broadsword; HMS Superb; HMS Brilliant; HMS Otus
- Awards: Knight Commander of the Order of the Bath

Vice Admiral Sir Geoffrey William Roger Biggs, KCB (23 November 1938 – 29 June 2002) was a senior Royal Navy officer who served as Deputy Commander-in-Chief Fleet from 1992 to 1995.

== Early life and family ==
Biggs was born on 23 November 1938, the son of Lieutenant Commander (later Vice Admiral Sir) Hilary Biggs and Florence Biggs (née Backhouse) and grandson of Admiral of the Fleet Sir Roger Backhouse. He was educated at Charterhouse and the Royal Naval College, Dartmouth.

In 1967, Biggs married Marcia Leask; they had three sons. Following the dissolution of his first marriage, he married Caroline Kerr (née Daly) in 1981; they had one daughter.

== Naval career ==
Biggs joined the Royal Navy in 1958 and qualified as a submariner. He went on to command the submarine HMS Otus and then the frigate HMS Brilliant. In the late 1970s he also commanded the submarine HMS Superb patrolling the Barents Sea above Norway. He was appointed Commanding Officer of the frigate HMS Broadsword and Captain of the 2nd Frigate Squadron in 1985, Director of Naval Operations and Trade under the Naval Staff at the Ministry of Defence in 1986 and Director of Naval Staff Duties in 1987. His last appointments were as Flag Officer Gibraltar in 1990 and Deputy Commander-in-Chief Fleet in 1992 before retiring in 1995.

Biggs was appointed a Knight Commander of the Order of the Bath in the 1993 New Year Honours.

== Later life ==
In retirement Biggs worked for International Computers Limited. He died on 29 June 2002, aged 63.

Military offices
Preceded by Sir Roy Newman	Deputy Commander-in-Chief Fleet; 1992–1995	Succeeded by Sir Jonathan Tod
