= Trade and Operations Division (Royal Navy) =

British Royal Navy, naval staff

- Active: 1961-1967
- Country: United Kingdom
- Allegiance: British Empire
- Branch: Royal Navy
- Type: Naval Staff Division
- Part of: Admiralty Naval Staff (1961—1964); Navy Department, Naval Staff (1964—1967)
- Garrison/HQ: Admiralty, then MOD; Whitehall; London, Great Britain

The Trade and Operations Division (TOD) was a division of the Admiralty Naval Staff created in 1961 following the merger of two former naval staff divisions one for Trade and the other for Operations. The staff division was administered by the Director, Trade and Operations Division. It existed until 1967.

== History ==
The division was established in July 1961 by amalgamating the Operations Division and the Trade Division into a single organisation. The division existed until April 1964 when the Admiralty was merged with the new Ministry of Defence it survived the merger now as part of the Navy Department, Naval Staff and retained its original name until November 1967 when it was renamed the Directorate of Naval Operations and Trade

== Directors of Trade and Operations Division ==
Included:

- Captain Ian M. Clegg, July 1961 -January 1964
- Captain Ian W. McLaughlan, January 1964-February 1966
- Captain Geoffrey C. Mitchell, February 1966-November 1967
