= Philip Wilcocks =

British Royal Navy officer (1953–2023)

Rear Admiral Philip Wilcocks CB DSC DL
- Born: 14 April 1953; Johor Bahru, Johor, Federation of Malaya
- Died: 9 April 2023 (aged 69); Herefordshire, England
- Military career
- Allegiance: United Kingdom
- Branch: Royal Navy
- Service years: 1971–2009
- Rank: Rear Admiral
- Commands: Flag Officer, Reserves; Scotland, Northern England, Northern Ireland; HMS Collingwood; 3rd Destroyer Squadron; HMS Liverpool; HMS Gloucester; HMS Stubbington
- Conflicts: Falklands War; Gulf War
- Awards: Companion of the Order of the Bath; Distinguished Service Cross

Rear Admiral Philip Lawrence Wilcocks, CB, DSC, DL (14 April 1953 – 9 April 2023) was a British senior Royal Navy officer who served as Rear Admiral Surface Ships.

== Early life ==
Philip Wilcocks was born in Johor Bahru, Malaysia on 14 April 1953 to Lieutenant Commander Arthur Frederick Wilcocks and Marjorie Wilcocks. He was educated at Oakham School and Wallington County Grammar School, before joining the Royal Navy in 1971. He studied naval architecture at the University of Wales in Cardiff.

== Naval career ==
Following initial sea training, Wilcocks was awarded the Queen's Telescope and the Queen's Gold Medal. His first appointments were the frigate HMS Torquay as navigating officer, followed by command of the fishery protection minesweeper HMS Stubbington in 1978.

After qualifying as a principal warfare officer in 1981, Wilcocks served in the frigate HMS Ambuscade, which included service in the Falklands War in 1982, when he was actively involved in directing naval fire support to land forces including the attack by the 2nd Battalion Parachute Regiment along Wireless Ridge just prior to the Argentinian surrender. His ship survived an Exocet missile attack.

Specialising in air warfare, Wilcocks became squadron operations officer to the Captain 3rd Destroyer Squadron in HMS Newcastle and HMS York. This included the task of group operations officer for the evacuation of Aden in 1984. He subsequently moved to the staff of Flag Officer Sea Training where he reinvigorated above water warfare training following his Falkland experiences.

Promoted to commander in 1989, Wilcocks assumed command of the destroyer HMS Gloucester in 1990. During this appointment, the Gloucester served in Operations Desert Shield and Desert Storm in support of the Gulf War, when the Lynx helicopter operating from his ship destroyed 7 enemy warships including 3 TNC-45 fast attack craft, a T43 minelayer, and a Polnocny-class landing ship, with Sea Skua missiles.

This was in the early phase of naval combat operations, with the Lynx (callsign '410' and one of four Fleet Air Arm Lynxes operating in the rotary-wing 'SUCAP' role – others flying from Cardiff, London and Brazen) generally operating over 120 miles from Gloucester, and being brought to bear on its targets either through its own sensors or through targeting information provided by the United States. During a later phase Gloucester fired her Sea Dart to shoot down a Silkworm missile which had been fired from the Al Fintas area of the Kuwait coast and which had been targeted against the battleship USS Missouri.

Although the Silkworm had missed its intended target, it still posed a threat to ships further downrange. The entire engagement from detection to destruction was less than 90 seconds. During Desert Storm, Gloucester also avoided 2 floating mines. Wilcocks was subsequently awarded the Distinguished Service Cross for gallantry and sustained leadership under fire.

After a tour on the Naval Operations staff in the Ministry of Defence (MOD), Wilcocks went on promotion to the Directorate of Operational Requirements (Sea Systems), where he was responsible for future ships and their combat systems, including the Type 45 destroyers, the LPDs HMS Albion and HMS Bulwark and the Bay Class LSDAs. In 1998, he assumed command of HMS Liverpool as Captain 3rd Destroyer Squadron, where he had oversight over 6 Type 42 destroyers.

Wilcocks rejoined the MOD as the Director of Naval Operations and Trade under the Naval Staff in 1999, a post he held until 2001. This tour included strategic crisis direction for East Timor, Gulf and Balkans operations while in 2000, he was the crisis director for Operation Palliser in support of the United Nations in Sierra Leone.

In July 2001, Wilcocks assumed command of the training establishment HMS Collingwood, and formed the new Maritime Warfare School. He took up the post of Deputy Chief of Joint Operations at the Permanent Joint Headquarters on promotion to rear admiral in early 2004; as well as operations in Iraq and Afghanistan, he was the crisis director for the United Kingdom's military response to the 2005 tsunami disaster.

Following a 7-month tour as Flag Officer Scotland, Northern England, Northern Ireland and Flag Officer Reserves, Wilcocks became Chief of Staff (capability) to Commander-in-Chief Fleet in January 2007, assuming responsibility for generating the fleet across all defence lines of development. As Rear Admiral Surface Ships he was also the "tribal chief" of the surface flotilla. He was appointed a Companion of the Order of the Bath in 2007.

== Corporate career ==
Wilcocks retired from the Royal Navy in 2009. He became owner/director at CEMPA (Leadership), and chairman of Maritime Films; he joined the board of Centerprise International in 2016. A churchwarden at Dore Abbey and lay co-chair of Abbeydore Deanery, he became a member of the Bishops Council for the Diocese of Hereford in 2012; he was also part of the Church of England Diocese Peer Review Panel. He was also the Chairman of GoAGT, a company providing armed guards for ships which was declared insolvent in 2014.

Wilcocks was president of the HMS Hood Association, and in 2017 became chairman of the board of Governors of Hereford Cathedral School.

== Death ==
Wilcocks died on 9 April 2023, at the age of 69.

Military offices
Preceded by Nick Harris	Flag Officer Scotland, Northern England and Northern Ireland; 2006–2006	Succeeded by Tony Johnstone-Burt
