= John Garnier (Royal Navy officer) =

Royal Navy Rear Admiral (1934–2026)

Rear-Admiral Sir John Garnier, KCVO, CBE (10 March 1934 – 31 July 2026) was a British Royal Navy officer and courtier. He served as Naval Equerry to the Queen between 1962 and 1965, Director of Naval Operations and Trade between 1982 and 1984, Flag Officer, Royal Yachts, between 1985 and 1990, and as Private Secretary and Comptroller to Princess Alexandra between 1991 and 1995. Garnier was appointed a Commander of the Order of the British Empire in 1982 and a Knight Commander of the Royal Victorian Order in 1990 (having previously been appointed a Lieutenant in 1965). He died on 31 July 2026, aged 92.
