= Jonathan Tod =

British Royal Navy officer (1939–2025)

Vice Admiral Sir Jonathan James Richard Tod KCB CBE
- Born: 26 March 1939; Pune, Maharashtra, India
- Died: 16 September 2025 (aged 86)
- Military career
- Allegiance: United Kingdom
- Branch: Royal Navy
- Service years: 1959–1997
- Rank: Vice Admiral
- Commands: HMS Brighton; HMS Fife; HMS Illustrious
- Conflicts: Falklands War
- Awards: Knight Commander of the Order of the Bath; Commander of the Order of the British Empire

Vice Admiral Sir Jonathan James Richard Tod KCB CBE (26 March 1939 – 16 September 2025) was a British Royal Navy officer who became Deputy Commander-in-Chief Fleet.

== Biography ==
Tod was born on 26 March 1939, in Pune, India. Educated at Gordonstoun and the Royal Naval College, Dartmouth, Tod joined the Royal Navy in 1959 and qualified as a naval pilot. He went on to command the frigate HMS Brighton and the destroyer HMS Fife. As a captain, Tod served in the Cabinet Office during the Falklands War for which he was awarded the CBE and after that commanded the aircraft carrier HMS Illustrious, succeeding Vice-Admiral Peter Woodhead, (in which Tod led the operation to recover survivors following the blowout of the Odyssey Oil Platform in 1988). He became Flag Officer Portsmouth in 1989 and Deputy Commander-in-Chief Fleet in 1994 before retiring in 1997.

In October 1965 Tod ejected from a Hawker Hunter following a mid-air collision during an air combat exercise in Scotland. In March 1967 he flew a Blackburn Buccaneer from RNAS Lossiemouth as part of the bombing operation to break up and release oil from the tanks of the SS Torrey Canyon which had run aground off the coast of Cornwall.

Tod died on 16 September 2025, at the age of 86.

Military offices
| Preceded by Sir Geoffrey Biggs | Deputy Commander-in-Chief Fleet; 1994–1997 | Succeeded by Sir Jeremy Blackham |
