= Simon Falla =

Simon Owen Falla
- Born: 1955 (age 70–71); Derbyshire, East Midlands
- Military career
- Allegiance: United Kingdom
- Branch: Royal Air Force
- Service years: 1979–2010
- Rank: Air Commodore
- Commands: RAF St Mawgan (2002–03); RAF Search and Rescue Force (2002–03); No. 7 Squadron (1996–99); No. 78 Squadron (1992)
- Conflicts: Falklands War; Gulf War
- Awards: Commander of the Order of the British Empire; Distinguished Service Order

Air Commodore Simon Owen Falla, CBE, DSO (born 1955) is a retired senior Royal Air Force officer. He was Deputy Commander and Chief of Staff Joint Helicopter Command from December 2006 until his retirement in June 2010.

== Service history ==
- 1979 – Joined the Royal Air Force.
- 1980 – Selected for helicopter training.
- 1981 – Joined the newly formed Chinook force, with No. 18(B) Squadron at RAF Odiham.
- 1982 – Sailed with the Task Force during Operation Corporate, flying operational sorties over the Falklands Islands.
- 1983 – Joined No. 7 Squadron's new Chinook Special Forces Flight, flying operationally in Lebanon.
- 1986 – Qualified as a helicopter instructor at RAF Shawbury. Service followed with the Chinook Operational Conversion Unit at RAF Odiham, gaining A2 instructional category and qualified as a helicopter tactics instructor.
- 1989 – Promoted to squadron leader, appointed deputy commander No. 7 Squadron.
- 1990 – Assumed command of Special Forces Flight.
- 1991 – Led Special Forces Flight during Operation Granby over Iraq. Made Companion of the Distinguished Service Order for his command of the 6-Chinook SF Flight.
- 1992 – Spent six months as officer commanding No. 78 Squadron RAF, RAF Mount Pleasant.
- 1993 – Appointed the helicopter tactics and trials officer at the RAF Air Warfare Centre.
- 1995 – Following numerous short tours and courses, promoted to wing commander.
- 1996 – Officer commanding No. 7 Squadron RAF (until 1998).
- 1999 – Appointed UK air/joint advisor to the United Arab Emirates Command and Staff College, Abu Dhabi.
- 2001 – Promoted to group captain.
- 2002 – Station commander RAF St Mawgan / Commander RAF Search and Rescue Force (until 2003).
- 2003 – Deputy assistant chief of staff (plans), Joint Helicopter Command.
- 2006 – Promoted to air commodore on appointment as deputy commander and chief of staff, Joint Helicopter Command.

== Post RAF ==
Falla is currently the training director at Ascent Military Flying Training System.

Military offices
Preceded by M W Leaming	Station Commander RAF St Mawgan; 2002–2003	Succeeded by J A Goodboum
Preceded by Tony Johnstone-Burt	Deputy Commander Joint Helicopter Command; 2006–2010	Succeeded by James Illingworth
