= Directorate of Naval Operations and Trade (Royal Navy) =

Directorate overview
- Formed: 1967
- Preceding Directorate: Trade and Operations Division
- Dissolved: 2003
- Jurisdiction: United Kingdom
- Headquarters: Ministry of Defence, Whitehall, London
- Directorate executive: Director of Naval Operations and Trade
- Parent department: Ministry of Defence (Navy Department)

The Directorate of Naval Operations and Trade was a staff directorate created in 1967 it replaced the Trade and Operations Division. The directorate under the Ministry of Defence (Naval Staff) as part of the Ministry of Defence (Navy Department). It was administered by the Director of Naval Operations and Trade. It existed until 2003.

== History ==
The directorate was established in November 1967 when it replaced the former Trade and Operations Division. Its initial responsibilities included the planning of operations; deployments and programming of ships and protection of merchant vessels. The directorate was administered by the Director of Naval Operations and Trade. The directorate was under the superintendence of the Assistant Chief of the Naval Staff (Operations/Air) (1967), Assistant Chief of the Naval Staff (Operations and Air), (1968-1984). It existed until March 2003 when it was abolished.

== Administration ==
Included:

=== Director of Naval Operations and Trade ===
1. Captain Terence L. Martin: November 1967-May 1970
2. Captain David A. Loram: May 1970-March 1971
3. Captain Dennis W. Foster: March 1971 – 1972
4. Captain David W. Brown: ?-November 1972
5. Captain Gwynedd I. Pritchard: November 1972-July 1974
6. Captain John M.H. Cox: July 1974-April 1976
7. Captain Michael C. Henry: April 1976-March 1978
8. Captain George M.F. Vallings: March 1978-May 1980
9. Captain Brian R. Outhwaite: May 1980-February 1982
10. Captain John Garnier: February 1982-January 1985
11. Captain A. Peter Woodhead: January 1985-June 1986
12. Captain Geoffrey R.W. Biggs: June 1986-October 1989
13. Captain John S. Lang: October 1989 – 1991
14. Captain Peter J. Cowling: 1992-1994
15. Commodore Christopher W. Roddis: 1994-1996
16. Captain Martin D. Macpherson: 1996-1998
17. Commodore David G. Snelson: 1998-1999
18. Commodore Philip L. Wilcocks: 1999-July 2001
19. Commodore Andrew P. Dickson: 2001-February 2003
20. Commodore Peter J.F. Eberle: February–March 2003

== Sources ==
1. Grove, Eric (1987). Vanguard to Trident : British naval policy since World War II. London, England: Bodley Head. ISBN 0370310217.
2. Mackie, Colin (January 2019). "Royal Navy Senior Appointments from 1865" (PDF). gulabin.com. C. Mackie.
3. Ministers and Departments: England". The Civil Service Yearbook (1 ed.). London, England: HM Stationery Office. 1974.ISBN 0116302143.
