= HMS Brighton (F106) =

1961 Type 12M or Rothesay-class frigate of the Royal Navy

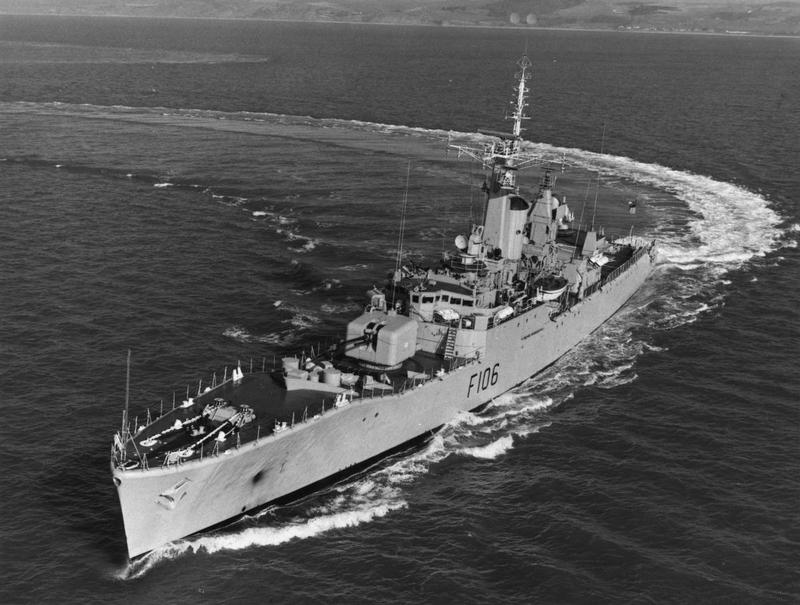
- HMS Brighton in 1972

History

United Kingdom
- Name: HMS Brighton
- Builder: Yarrow & Co Ltd, Glasgow
- Laid down: 23 July 1957
- Launched: 30 October 1959
- Commissioned: October 1961
- Decommissioned: 1981
- Identification: Pennant number: F106
- Fate: Sold for scrap 16 September 1985

General characteristics
- Class & type: Rothesay-class frigate
- Displacement: 2,800 tons
- Length: 370 ft
- Beam: 41 ft
- Draught: 17 ft 4 in
- Propulsion: 2 x Babcock & Wilcox boilers operating at 550lb sq. in, 850 °F (454 °C) English Electric geared turbines, 2 shafts, 30000 shafts horsepower
- Speed: 30 knts
- Complement: 235
- Armament: 2 x 4.5" dual purpose on a Mk VI Mounting 1 x 40mm on STAGG mounting 2 x Limbo Mortar Mk 10 Mountings
- Aircraft carried: 1 x Wasp helicopter

HMS Brighton was a Rothesay or Type 12M class anti-submarine frigate of the Royal Navy.

== Design and construction ==
The Rothesay-class was an improved version of the Whitby-class anti-submarine frigate, with nine Rothesays ordered in the 1954–55 shipbuilding programme for the Royal Navy to supplement the six Whitbys.

Brighton was 370 feet 0 inches (112.78 m) long overall and 360 feet 0 inches (109.73 m) between perpendiculars, with a beam of 41 feet 0 inches (12.50 m) and a draught of 13 feet 6 inches (4.11 m). The Rothesays were powered by the same Y-100 machinery used by the Whitby-class. Two Babcock & Wilcox water-tube boilers fed steam at 550 pounds per square inch (3,800 kPa) and 850 °F (454 °C) to two sets of geared steam turbines which drove two propeller shafts, fitted with large (2 feet (0.61 m) diameter) slow-turning propellers. The machinery was rated at 30,000 shaft horsepower (22,000 kW), giving a speed of 29.5 knots (33.9 mph; 54.6 km/h). Crew was about 212 officers and men. (Note: Conway's states the crew of a Rothesay ranged from 200–235, while Jane's Fighting Ships 1962–63 states a crew of 200 (9 officers and 191 ratings))

A twin 4.5-inch (113 mm) Mark 6 gun mount was fitted forward, with 350 rounds of ammunition carried. It was originally intended to fit a twin 40 mm L/70 Bofors anti-aircraft mount aft, but in 1957 it was decided to fit the Seacat anti-aircraft missile instead. Seacat was not yet ready, and Brighton was completed with a single L/60 40 mm Bofors mount aft as a temporary anti-aircraft armament. The design anti-submarine armament consisted of twelve 21-inch torpedo-tubes (eight fixed and two twin rotating mounts) for Mark 20E Bidder homing anti-submarine torpedoes, backed up by two Limbo anti-submarine mortars fitted aft. The Bidder homing torpedoes proved unsuccessful however, being too slow to catch modern submarines, and the torpedo tubes were soon removed.

The ship was fitted with a Type 293Q surface/air search radar on the foremast, with a Type 277 height-finding radar on a short mast forward of the foremast. A Mark 6M fire control system (including a Type 275 radar) for the 4.5 inch guns was mounted above the ship's bridge, while a Type 974 navigation radar was also fitted. The ship's sonar fit consisted of Type 174 search, Type 170 fire control sonar for Limbo and a Type 162 sonar for classifying targets on the sea floor.

Brighton was laid down at Yarrows' Scotstoun, Glasgow shipyard on 23 July 1957, was launched on 31 October 1959 and was completed on 28 September 1961, commissioning with the pennant number F106.

=== Modernisation ===
From August 1968 to 18 February 1972 Brighton underwent a major modernisation, which brought the ship close in capability to the Leander-class. A hangar and flight deck was added aft to allow a Westland Wasp helicopter to be operated, at the expense of one of the Limbo anti-submarine mortars, while a Seacat launcher and the associated GWS20 director was mounted on the hangar roof. Two 20-mm cannons were added either side of the ship's bridge. A MRS3 fire control system replaced the Mark 6M, and its integral Type 903 radar allowed the Type 277 height finder radar to be removed. A Type 993 surface/air-search radar replaced the existing Type 293Q radar, while the ship's defences were enhanced by the addition of the Corvus chaff rocket dispenser.

== Service ==
After commissioning and work-up, Brighton joined the 6th Frigate Squadron and in 1963 joined the 30th Escort Squadron. In June 1965, she sailed for the Far East, carrying out anti-infiltration patrols during the Indonesia–Malaysia confrontation as well as taking part in a joint exercise with the US Navy in the South China Sea, before returning to Britain on 15 December that year. In August 1966, she left British waters to take part in the Beira Patrol, operating off East Africa for almost four months, before diverting to Singapore in December that year. In January 1968, Brighton served as leader of the newly established NATO Standing Naval Force Atlantic (STANAVFORLANT).

Brighton attended the 1977 Silver Jubilee Fleet Review off Spithead when she was part of the 6th Frigate Squadron. During 1978 and 1979, she was captained by Commander J J R Tod.

She was offered for sale to friendly nations, as a result of the 1981 Nott Defence Review, paid off in November 1981, the first of her class to be disposed-of.

She was sold for scrap to Dean Marine in 1985, arriving at their Medway yard for breaking up on 16 September 1985.

== Publications ==
- Blackman, Raymond V. B. (1962). Jane's Fighting Ships 1962–63. London: Sampson Low, Marston & Co., Ltd.
- Colledge, J. J.; Warlow, Ben (2006) [1969]. Ships of the Royal Navy: The Complete Record of All Fighting Ships of the Royal Navy from the 15th Century to the Present (3rd Rev ed.). London: Chatham Publishing. ISBN 978-1-86176-281-8. OCLC 67375475.
- Critchley, Mike (1992). British Warships Since 1945: Part 5: Frigates. Liskeard, UK: Maritime Press. ISBN 0-907771-13-0.
- Friedman, Norman (2008). British Destroyers & Frigates: The Second World War and After. Barnsley, UK: Seaforth Publishing. ISBN 978-1-84832-015-4.
- Marriott, Leo (1983). Royal Navy Frigates 1945–1983. Shepperton, Surrey, UK: Ian Allan Ltd. ISBN 0-7110-1322-5.
- Gardiner, Robert; Chumbley, Stephen, eds. (1995). Conway's All The World's Fighting Ships 1947–1995. Annapolis, Maryland, USA: Naval Institute Press. ISBN 1-55750-132-7.
