= Operation Granby =

British operations of the 1991 Gulf War

- Part of the Gulf War
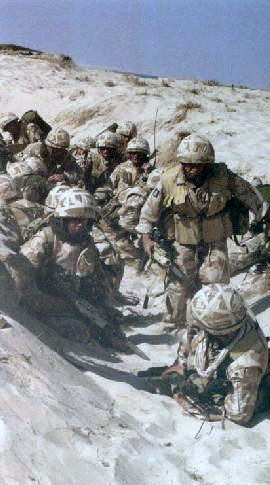
- C Company, 1st Battalion The Staffordshire Regiment, in a live firing exercise, during Operation Granby, 6 January 1991.
- Operational scope: Strategic offensive
- Location: Ba'athist Iraq, Kuwait, Saudi Arabia, Israel; 29.367°N 47.967°E
- Objective: Iraqi withdrawal from Kuwait; Emir Jaber III restored
- Executed by: United Kingdom
- Outcome: Operational success
- Location within Kuwait

Operation Granby, commonly abbreviated Op Granby, was the code name given to the British military operations during the 1991 Gulf War. 53,462 members of the British Armed Forces were deployed during the conflict. Forty-seven British personnel were killed during Op Granby and many more were injured during the hostilities there. The total cost of operations was £2.434 billion (1992), of which at least £2.049 billion was paid for by other nations such as Kuwait and Saudi Arabia. £200 million of equipment was lost or written off.

== Commanders ==
The Joint Commander Gulf Forces, based in the United Kingdom at RAF High Wycombe, was Air Chief Marshal (ACM) Sir Patrick Hine 1 October 1990 – 31 March 1991, and Air Chief Marshal Sir Michael Graydon from 31 March 1991. His political adviser was Andrew Palmer.

The Commander of British Forces Middle East, the in-theatre commander, based in Riyadh, was Air Marshal (AM) Andrew Wilson (September–October 1990), then Lieutenant-General Sir Peter de la Billière 6 October 1990 – March 1991, and Air Vice-Marshal Ian Macfadyen from March 1991.

The Air Commander of British Forces Middle East, initially Arabian Peninsula, was Air Vice Marshal Andrew Wilson from August to 17 November 1990, then Air Vice Marshal William (Bill) Wratten from 17 November 1990.

The Senior British Naval Officer Middle East was Captain Anthony McEwen, Royal Navy until September 1990, on HMS York, then Commodore Paul Haddacks from September to December 1990. Commodore Christopher Craig, on HMS Brave and HMS London, was in command from 3 December 1990 to March 1991.

== Royal Air Force ==
Within nine days of the invasion of Kuwait on 2 August 1990, 12 Panavia Tornado F3 interceptors from 5 (AC) Squadron and 29 (F) Squadron from RAF Coningsby arrived in Saudi Arabia, alongside aircraft of the United States Air Force (USAF). Later, Jaguar GR1 aircraft from RAF Coltishall, and Tornado GR1s, redeployed from service in RAF Germany deployed to the theatre. Buccaneer aircraft from RAF Lossiemouth were deployed in order to laser designate ground targets for the Tornado and Jaguar.

This action had the effect of maintaining the confidence of friendly nations, and limiting the potential for further Iraqi expansion. When an economic embargo was placed on Iraq, these aircraft helped maintain it. The force of Tornado F3s was expanded to 18, drawn from the three British bases then housing F3s, RAF Leuchars, RAF Leeming, and RAF Coningsby, with 27 air crew and 350 ground personnel. RAF ground personnel and aircraft weapons technicians were also taken from TWCU at RAF Honington, and operated Tornados out of Tabuk airfield.

The first SCUD missile attack launched against a coalition airbase was at Tabuk. It was a conventional missile and only caused minor damage.

RAF forces were based at the Royal Saudi Air Force airbase at Dhahran, from where they flew patrols inside the range of Iraqi ground radar systems. Before the launch of the operation to liberate Kuwait, they flew over 2,000 sorties. Victor tankers based at Jubail Naval Base provided AAR support to all the coalition aircraft. Hercules, VC10, and TriStar aircraft supplied both the Royal Air Force and other military endeavours. Nimrod MR.2P aircraft assisted naval operations. At bases in Tabuk, Dhahran, and Muharraq, the RAF deployed Rapier missiles as part of surface-to-air defences. In total, around 6,000 RAF personnel were deployed to the Gulf.

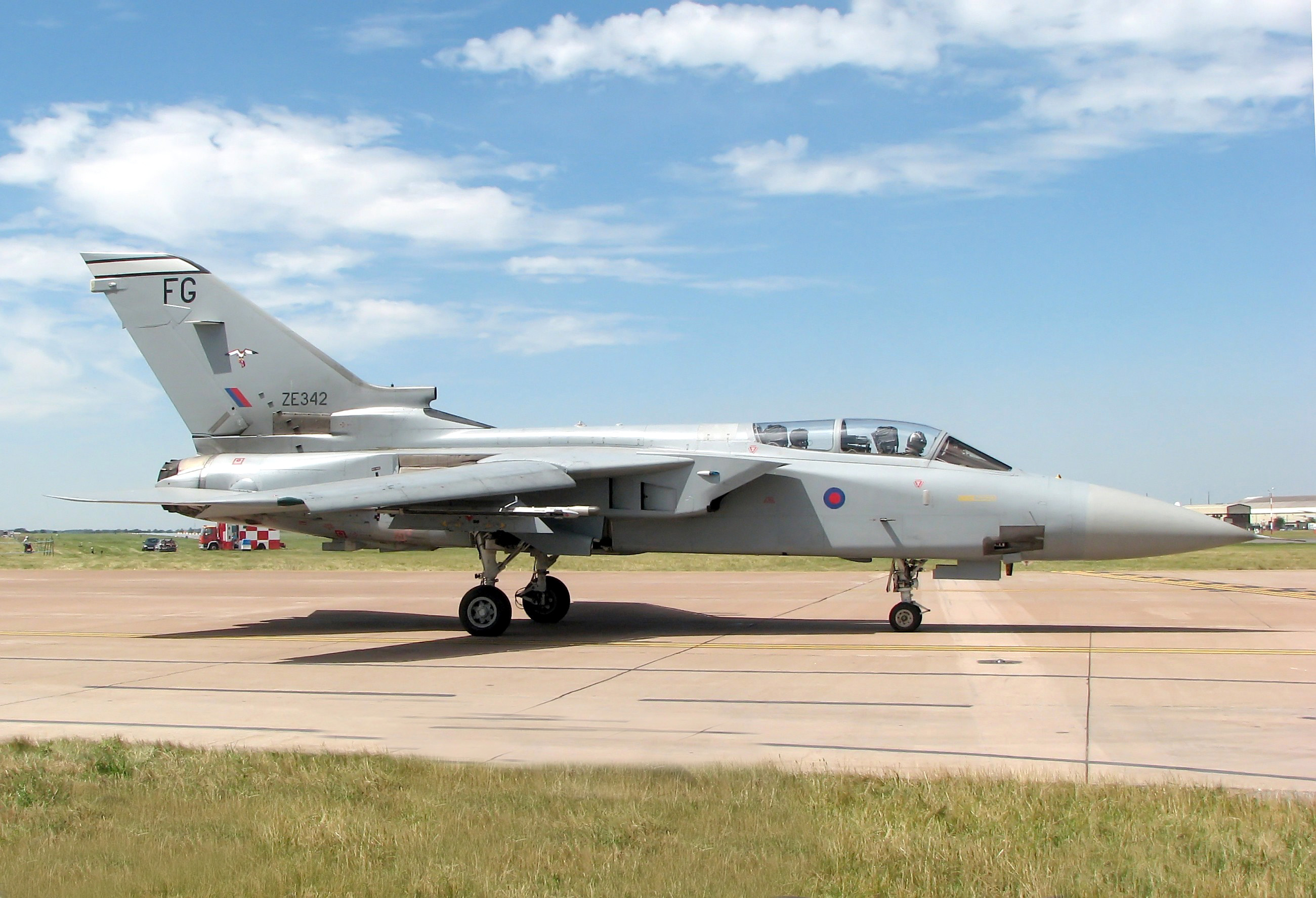
A Royal Air Force Tornado F3, an aircraft used by the RAF in the Gulf War.

RAF commanders, along with the other partners in the coalition, deemed it necessary to prevent the Iraqi Air Force (IrAF) operating to any significant degree. Believed to have around 700 combat aircraft, as well as Scud ballistic missiles and chemical weapons, they could not be left to help support Iraqi ground forces, now entrenched in positions on the border. Because of the level of supplies coming from Iraq to forces in Kuwait, it would have been impossible to separate targets merely in Kuwait from an offensive into Iraq. Coalition air forces outnumbered the IrAF 3-to-1.

The first part of the Gulf War air campaign was directed against the IrAF. Early on 17 January, RAF Tornado GR1s flew into Iraq, with air-to-air refuelling tanker support. The first targets were Iraqi airbases, which housed a variety of defence systems and aircraft. These attacks were co-ordinated in Riyadh by the Joint Allied Headquarters, with Wratten now leading the British command. Aircraft were almost totally integrated into a single coalition force. Support aircraft in raids, therefore, could be from any coalition power. Within 24 hours, a hundred sorties were completed.

After seven days, the RAF's focus, like the rest of coalition air forces, moved to targets supporting Iraqi forces in Kuwait. These included oil refineries, and strategic bridges over the River Euphrates. During operations, civilians were killed in incidences when the sophisticated guidance systems on the weaponry used failed, and buildings close to these bridges, many in populated areas, were hit instead. On the whole, many pilots were frustrated by the lack of combat.

In every combat role, the RAF was second to USAF involvement, but ahead of other members of the coalition. Of the around 55 Allied aircraft lost, eight were RAF Tornados; these aircraft types flew a total of 2,500 sorties. Five air crew were lost in operations, and three in preparations.

== British Army ==
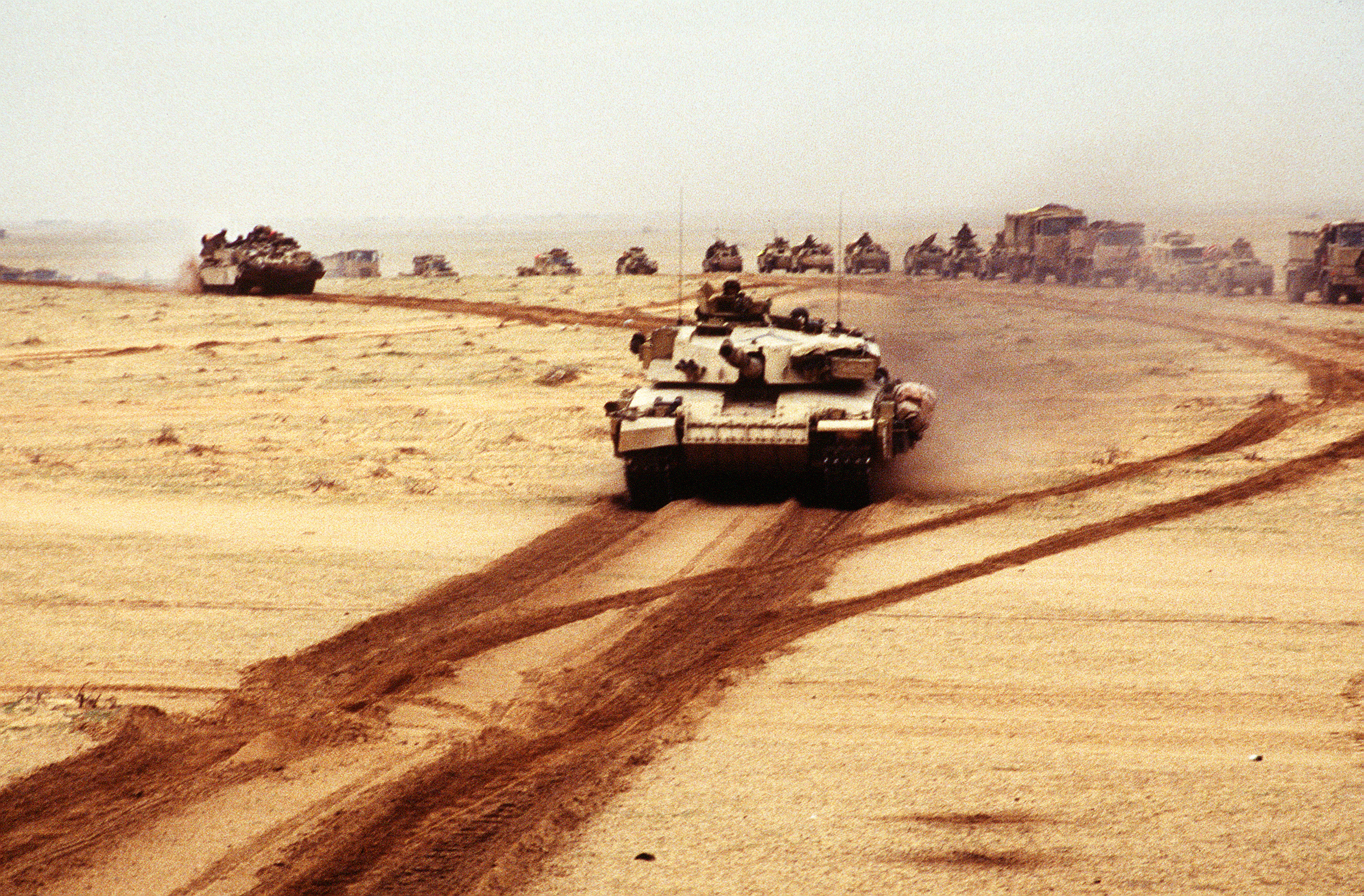
A British Army Challenger 1 tank during the Gulf War, February 1991

A single British Army armoured brigade was initially dispatched to the Gulf, later augmented to a two-brigade division, which became the 1st Armoured Division. The decision was made that the relatively new Challenger tank be sent, rather than the older and more reliable Chieftain tanks, which were being superseded. The Prime Minister, Margaret Thatcher, "insisted on Challenger's reliability in the Gulf. In consequence to this demand, BAOR regiments in Germany became 'a scrap yard' of [tank hulls] without spares, sitting on wooden blocks. Everything else was being sent to the Gulf as spares in support of 7th Armoured Brigade." The entire British Army's power pack repair facility was deployed to the Gulf with the division.

The ground forces had a peak strength of 28,000 men, comprising 7,000 vehicles, including 179 Challenger 1 tanks, 316 Warriors, 79 artillery pieces and 16 MLRS.

During the ground phase, the 1st Armoured Division took part in the "left-hook" which outflanked Iraqi forces. It participated in the Battle of Norfolk. British Challenger 1 tanks destroyed approximately 300 Iraqi tanks, including achieving the longest-range tank-kill in the war from three miles away.

The British Army also inflicted heavy artillery and various other combat vehicle losses on the Iraqi Army. The British Army destroyed approximately five Iraqi divisions in 48 hours of combat. A friendly fire incident, when an American Fairchild Republic A-10A Thunderbolt aircraft attacked two British Warrior vehicles, resulted in the deaths of nine British service personnel. This incident was featured in an edition of The Cook Report entitled "Death by Maverick".

== Royal Navy ==
The Royal Navy made a significant contribution to Allied efforts in the early stages of the war. In particular, Royal Navy Westland Lynx helicopters were responsible for the destruction of almost the entire Iraqi Navy in the Battle of Bubiyan, also known as the Battle of the Bubiyan Channel.

Royal Navy minehunters cleared Iraqi mines near the Kuwaiti coast, allowing the US battleships Wisconsin and Missouri to move in close enough to launch devastating bombardments against Iraqi ground forces. HMS Gloucester intercepted an Iraqi Silkworm missile heading towards HMS London, mine countermeasures vessels, and the US battleships.

== See also ==
- Operation Granby order of battle
- List of Gulf War military equipment#United Kingdom
- List of British gallantry awards for Operation Granby
