= HMS Royal Arthur (shore establishment) =

Shore establishment of the Royal Navy

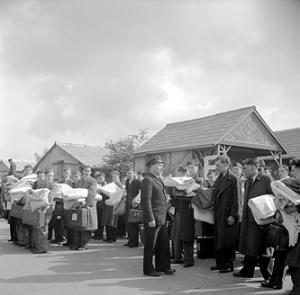
- The Petty Officer in charge meets trainee Belgian sailors as they arrive at HMS Royal Arthur, Skegness, Lincolnshire.

History

United Kingdom
- Name: HMS Royal Arthur
- Commissioned: 22 September 1939 (at Skegness); 2 January 1947 (at Corsham)
- Decommissioned: 1946 (Skegness); 1 April 1950 (Corsham)
- Fate: Name transferred to Camp Kingsmoor in 1950; Kingsmoor closed on 5 March 1992; Corsham site demolished in 2014

General characteristics
- Class & type: Stone frigate

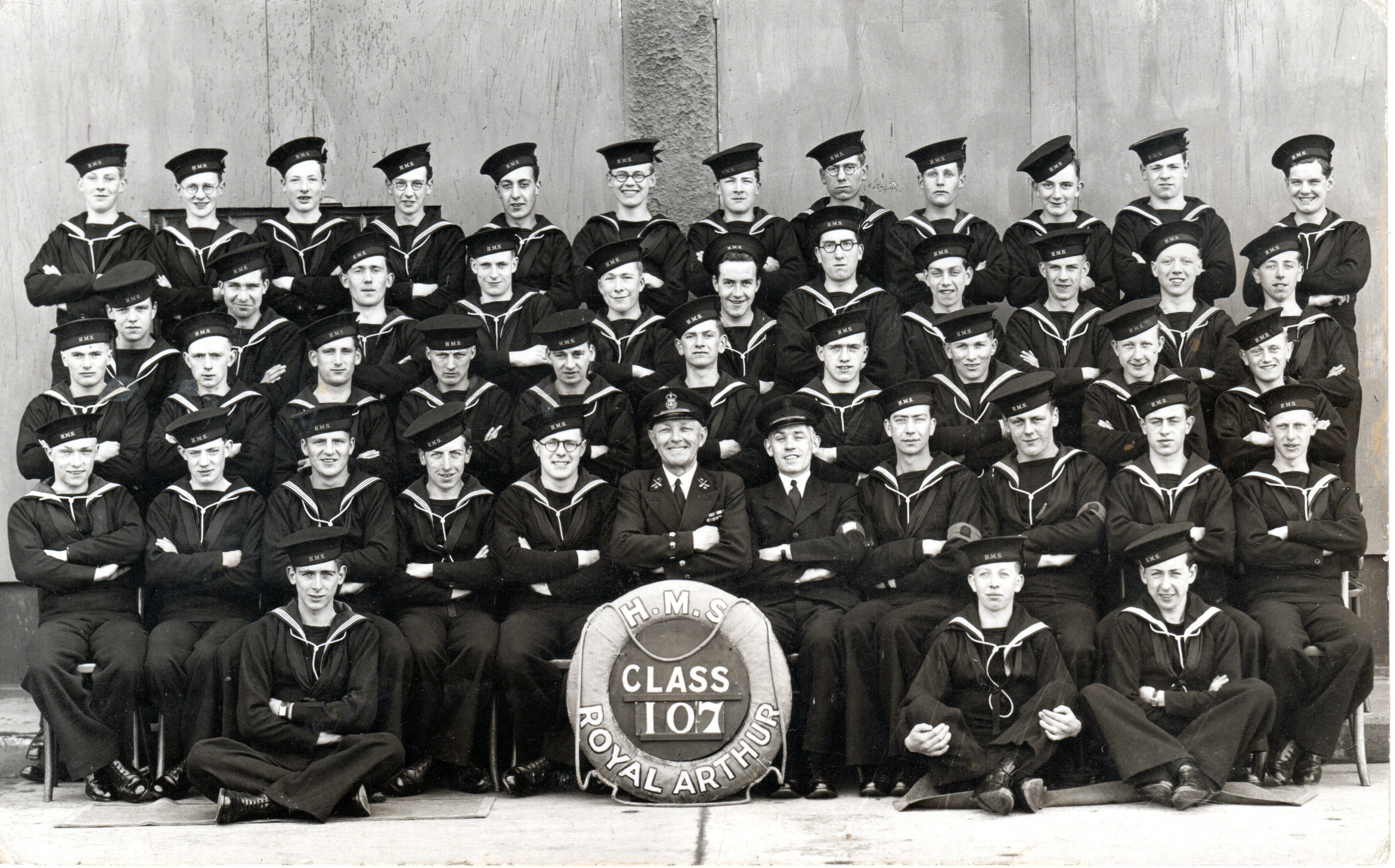
Passing Out photo of recruits from April 1943

HMS Royal Arthur was a shore establishment of the Royal Navy, initially at Ingoldmells near Skegness, and later at Corsham, Wiltshire. During the Second World War, the former holiday camp at Ingoldmells was used to mainly train 'Hostilities Only' (for the duration of the war only) communications branch ratings and officers (signalmen, telegraphists, coders and wireless operators).

== Skegness ==
Shortly after the start of the Second World War, the Admiralty requisitioned the Butlins holiday camp at Ingoldmells near Skegness to be the first Royal Arthur stone frigate (land based establishment). It was commissioned as a training establishment on 22 September 1939.

Over 4000 naval personnel were based at Royal Arthur at one time. In 1942 a lowflying German bomber wrecked dozens of the chalets and killed four men.

It served throughout the Second World War as the central reception depot for new naval recruits after HMS Raleigh was transferred to the British Army in February 1944. Royal Arthur continued in service until being paid off in 1946.

== Corsham ==
The establishment was recommissioned on 2 January 1947 in Westwells Road, Corsham as a leadership training establishment, and one of several assessment camps where new recruits were assessed, kitted out and sent to their various depots.

The last recruits arrived on 31 October 1949 and on 15 March 1950 it ceased to be used for training National Service inductees and concentrated on leadership training of Petty Officers at the instigation of Lord Louis Mountbatten. The name was then transferred to the recently paid off Camp Kingsmoor on 16 March 1950. The camp continued in service until the last trainees left on 11 December 1992 and personnel finally left on 5 March 1993.

The site suffered heavy vandalism since its abandonment and in 2014 the site was demolished to build a retirement home complex, complete with a spa and restaurant.

== Gallery ==
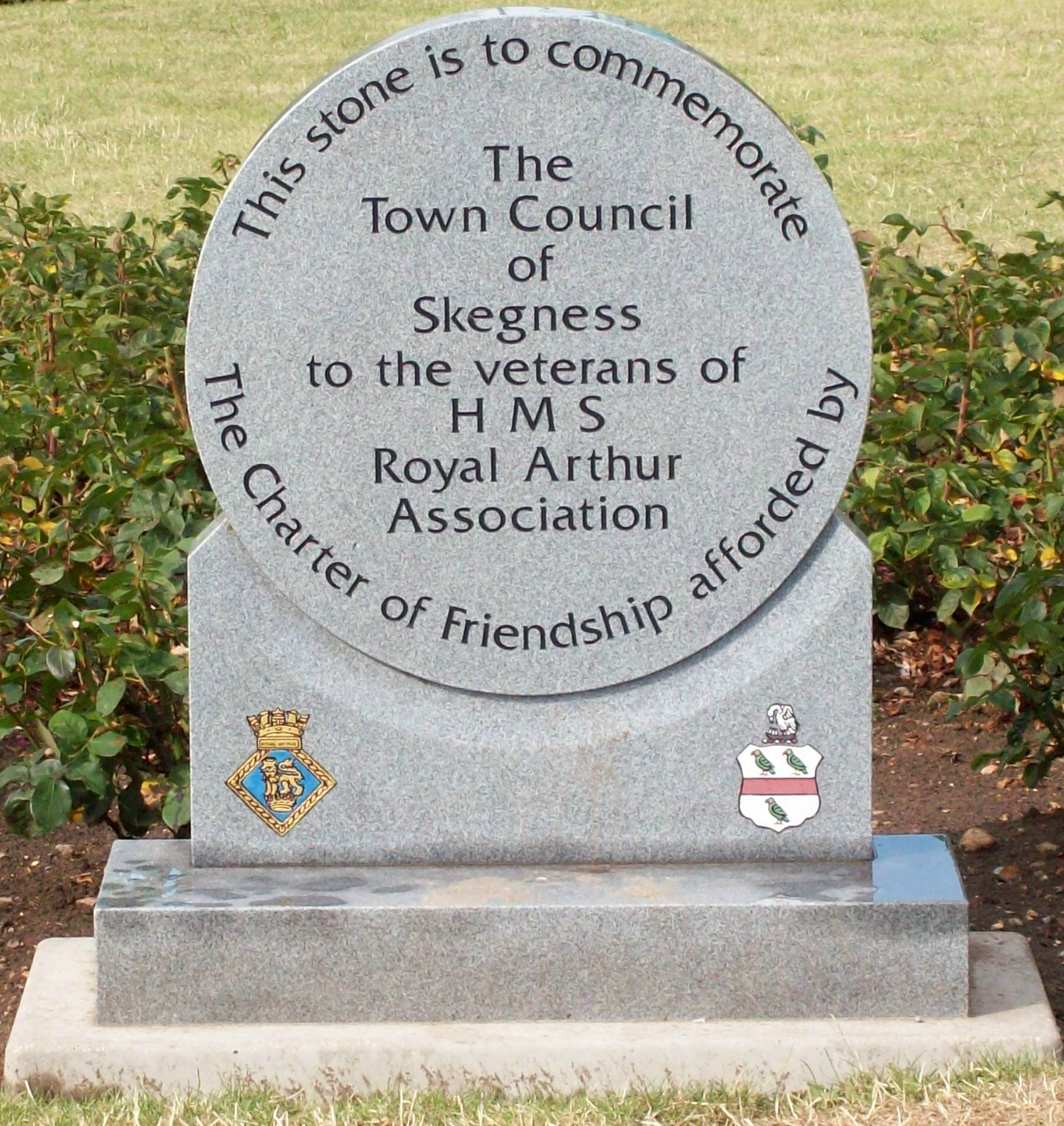
HMS Royal Arthur commemorative stone in Skegness

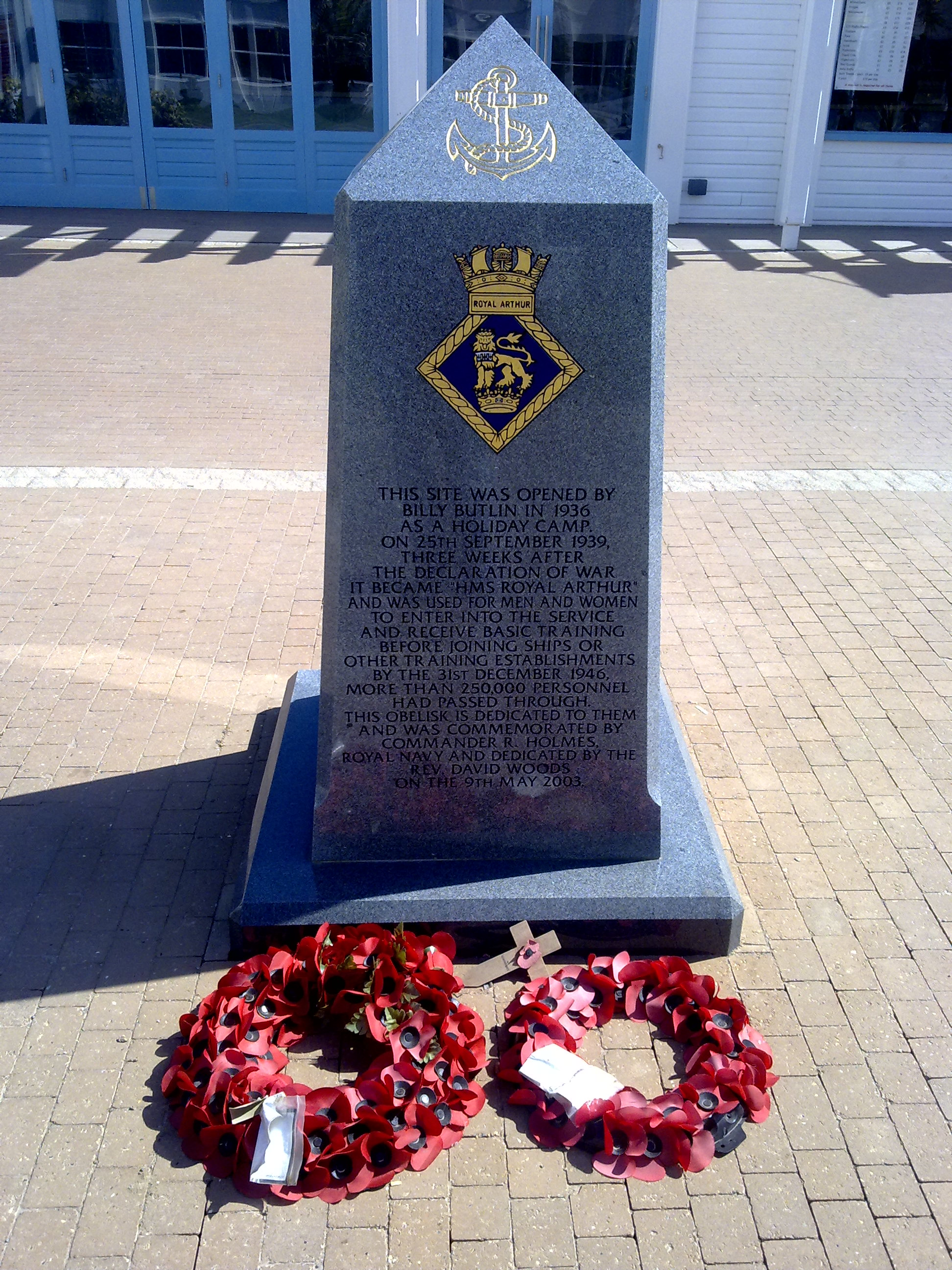
Butlins Skegness Memorial

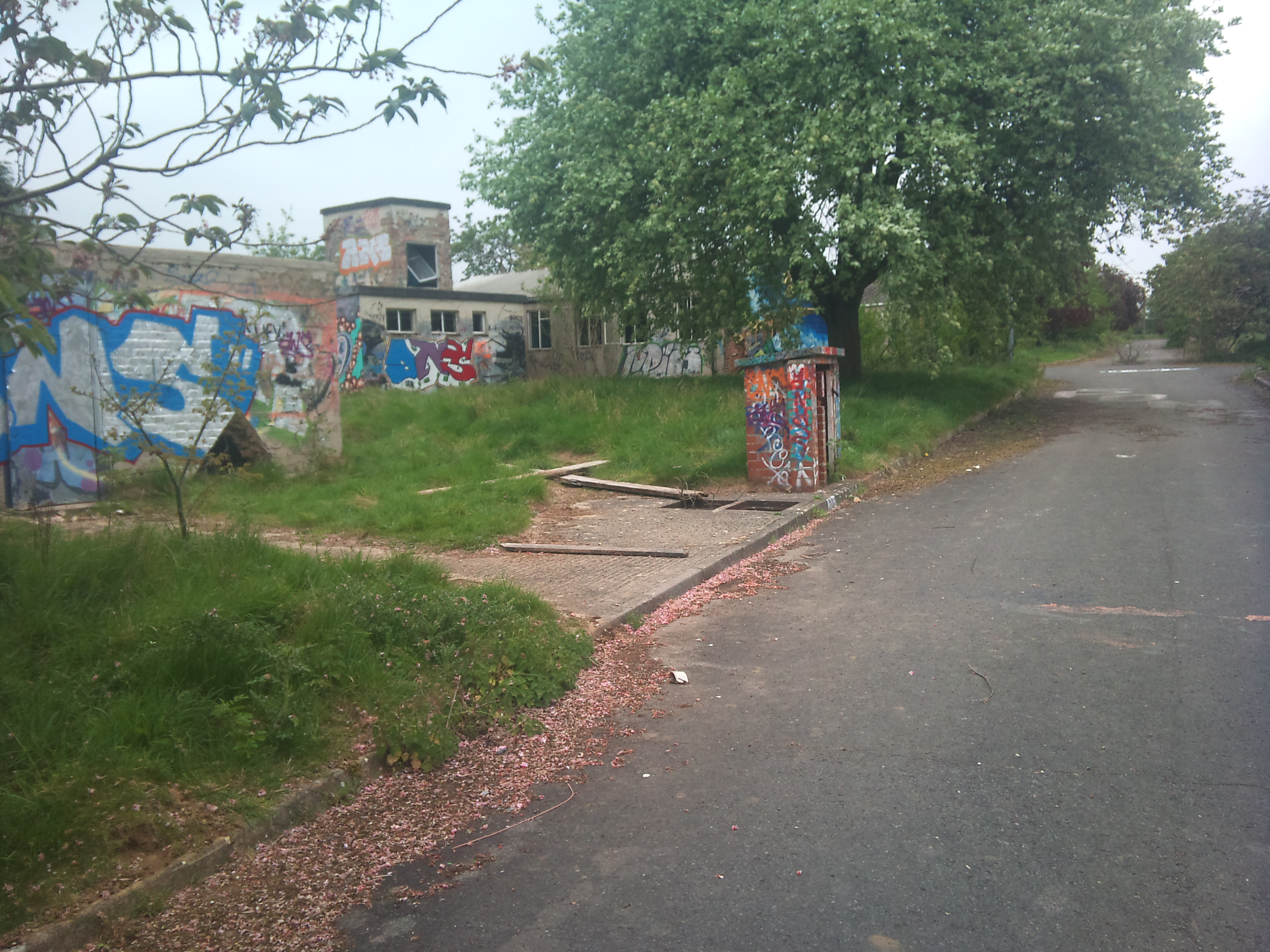
HMS Royal Arthur Corsham site in 2011
