= HMS Stubbington =

Minesweeper of the Royal Navy

History

United Kingdom
- Name: HMS Stubbington
- Builder: Camper & Nicholson, Portsmouth
- Laid down: 26 October 1954
- Launched: 8 August 1956
- Commissioned: 30 July 1957
- Renamed: HMS Montose - June 1972–1976
- Identification: Pennant number M1204

General characteristics
- Class & type: Ton-class minesweeper
- Displacement: 440 long tons
- Length: 152 ft (46.3 m)
- Beam: 28 ft (8.5 m)
- Draught: 8 ft (2.4 m)
- Propulsion: 2 Napier Deltic, producing 3,000 shp (2,200 kW)
- Speed: 15 knots (28 km/h)
- Armament: 1 × Bofors 40 mm L/60 gun; 1 × Oerlikon 20 mm cannon; 1 × M2 Browning machine gun

HMS Stubbington was a Ton-class minesweeper which saw service with the Royal Navy during the Cold War. Built by Camper & Nicholson, Portsmouth, she was launched on 8 August 1956. She served as a minesweeper in the Mediterranean and the Middle East in the 1950s and 1960s, and in the Royal Navy Reserve under the name HMS Montrose from 1972 to 1976. She then was used for Fishery Protection duties. Stubbington was broken up in 1989.

== Construction and design ==
Stubbington was laid down at Camper & Nicholson's Portsmouth yard on 26 October 1954 and launched on 8 August 1956. She was commissioned on 30 July 1957.

She was 152 feet (46.33 m) long overall and 140 feet (42.67 m) between perpendiculars, with a beam of 28 feet 9 inches (8.76 m) and a draught of 8 feet 3 inches (2.51 m). Displacement was 360 long tons (370 t) normal and 425 long tons (432 t) deep load. Stubbington was powered by a pair of Napier Deltic diesel engines, giving a total of 3,000 shaft horsepower (2,200 kW). 45 tons of fuel were carried, giving a range of 3,000 nautical miles (3,500 mi; 5,600 km) at 8 knots (9.2 mph; 15 km/h). As one of the later Ton-class ships, Stubbington was fitted with an enclosed bridge and tripod mast rather than the open bridge and lattice mast fitted to earlier ships.

Armament consisted of a single Bofors 40 mm anti-aircraft gun forward and two Oerlikon 20 mm cannon aft. Minesweeping equipment included wire sweeps for sweeping moored contact mines and acoustic or magnetic sweeps for dealing with influence mines. The ship had a crew of 27 in peacetime and 39 in wartime.

== Service ==
On commissioning, Stubbington joined the 108th Mine Sweeping Squadron based in Malta. She was based at Aden in 1961–62 before returning to the Mediterranean, joining the 7th Mine Sweeping Squadron.

On 15 January 1968, an earthquake struck Sicily, with Stubbington being deployed in relief efforts. In May 1969, after a refit at Gibraltar, she returned to British waters, serving as a Navigation tender at Portsmouth, and in June 1972 she joined the Tay division of the Royal Navy Reserve, based at Dundee as part of the 10th Mine Counter Measures Squadron, and was renamed HMS Montrose while attached to the Tay Division.

In 1976 she returned to her original name, and in June 1977, after a 14-month refit at Chatham Dockyard, joined the Fishery Protection Squadron. She was refitted again in 1979, before returning to fishery protection duties. She remained part of the Fishery Protection Squadron in 1986. She was sold for scrap in 1989, arriving at Bilbao on 26 September 1989 for breaking up.

== Publications ==
- Blackman, Raymond V. B. (1962). Jane's Fighting Ships 1962–63. London: Sampson Low, Marston & Co. Ltd.
- Brown, D. K.; Moore, George (2012). Rebuilding the Royal Navy: Warship Design Since 1945. Barnsley, UK: Seaforth Publishing. ISBN 978-1-84832-150-2.
- Colledge, J. J.; Warlow, Ben (2006) [1969]. Ships of the Royal Navy: The Complete Record of All Fighting Ships of the Royal Navy from the 15th Century to the Present (3rd Rev ed.). London: Chatham Publishing. ISBN 978-1-86176-281-8. OCLC 67375475.
- Couhat, Jean Laybayle; Baker, A. D., eds. (1986). Combat Fleets of the World 1986/87: Their Ships, Aircraft and Armament. Annapolis, Maryland: Naval Institute Press. ISBN 0-85368-860-5.
- De La Rue, Colin; Anderson, Charles B. (2015). Shipping and the Environment (Second ed.). New York: Routledge. ISBN 978-1-843-11323-2.
- Gardiner, Robert; Chumbley, Stephen, eds. (1995). Conway's All The World's Fighting Ships 1947–1995. Annapolis, Maryland, USA: Naval Institute Press. ISBN 1-55750-132-7.
- Moore, John, ed. (1979). Jane's Fighting Ships 1979–80. London: Jane's Yearbooks. ISBN 0-354-00587-1.
- Worth, Jack (1984). British Warships Since 1945: Part 4: Minesweepers. Liskeard, UK: Maritime Books. ISBN 0-907771-12-2.
