= HMS Gloucester (D96) =

British guided missile destroyer (1985–2011)

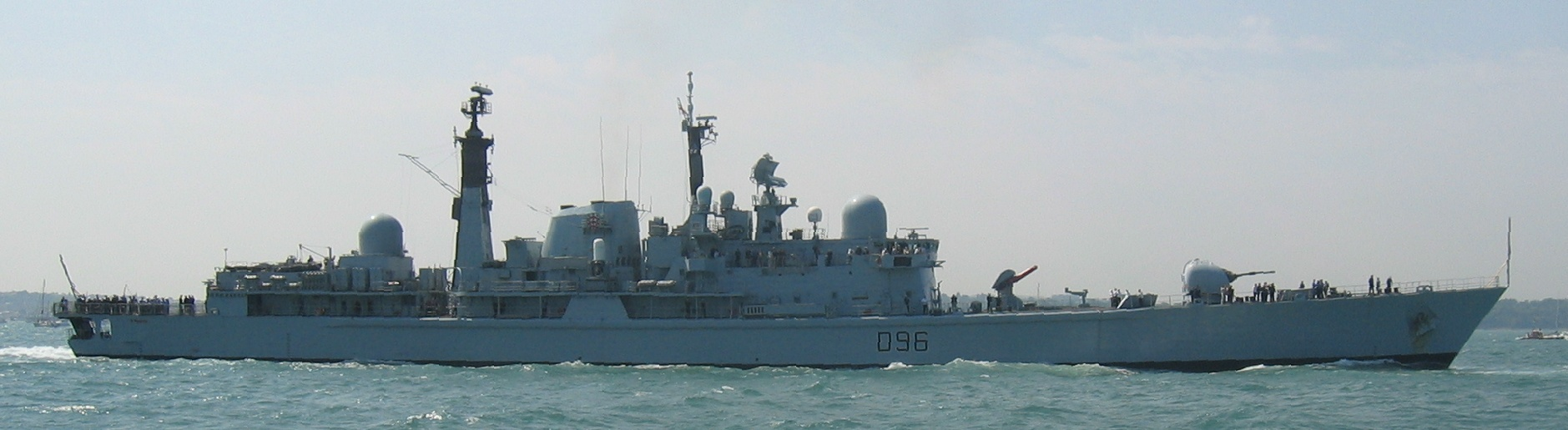
- HMS Gloucester

History

United Kingdom
- Name: HMS Gloucester
- Builder: Vosper Thornycroft
- Laid down: 29 October 1979
- Launched: 2 November 1982
- Sponsored by: The Duchess of Gloucester
- Commissioned: 11 September 1985
- Decommissioned: 30 June 2011
- Home port: HMNB Portsmouth
- Identification: Pennant number: D96; Deck code: GC; IMO number: 4907086; MMSI number: 226772033; International callsign: GBBF
- Motto: Prorsum ("Onwards")
- Nickname(s): "The Fighting G"
- Fate: Sold for scrap
- Badge: On a Field Blue a Trident White enfiled by a horseshoe gold

General characteristics
- Class & type: Type 42 destroyer
- Displacement: 5,200 tonnes
- Length: 141 m (463 ft)
- Beam: 15.2 m (50 ft)
- Propulsion: COGOG (Combination of Gas or Gas) turbines, 2 shafts; 2 turbines producing 36 MW (48,000 hp)
- Speed: 30 knots (56 km/h)
- Complement: 287
- Armament: Twin Sea Dart missile launcher, with 22 missiles, space reserved for an additional 15; 1 × 4.5 inch (113 mm) Mk 8 gun; 2 × 20 mm Oerlikon guns; 2 × Phalanx Close-in weapon system (CIWS); NATO Seagnat and DLF3 Decoy Launchers
- Aircraft carried: 1 x Lynx HMA8 armed with; 4 × anti ship missiles; 2 × anti submarine torpedoes

HMS Gloucester was a Batch 3 Type 42 destroyer of the Royal Navy, built by Vosper Thorneycroft at Woolston, Southampton and launched on 2 November 1982 by The Duchess of Gloucester. Gloucester was one of the modified last four of the class to be built, having a lengthened hull design giving better seakeeping qualities, greater endurance and an external 'strake' to counter longitudinal cracking, seen on earlier ships of the type.

== History ==
In January 1987 Gloucester sailed for her first deployment; Armilla patrol, protecting civilian ships transiting the Strait of Hormuz. Port visits included Djibouti City; Sharjah; Manama; Karachi; Mombasa and Naples, returning to her homeport in June 1987.

In January 1988 the ship again deployed to the Gulf for an Armilla patrol. Port visits this time included Bahrain; Dubai; Mombasa and Rhodes. Further visits were planned but these were curtailed due to increasing tensions in the region.

In April 1989 Gloucester deployed westbound to perform duties as West Indies Guard Ship. Port visits included Nassau, Bahamas; Anguilla; Antigua; British Virgin Islands; Kingston, Jamaica; Acapulco; Long Beach, California; San Francisco and West Palm Beach.

=== First Gulf War ===
Gloucester served in the Persian Gulf War in 1991 under the command of Commander (later Rear Admiral) Philip Wilcocks where her most notable action was to shoot down an Iraqi Silkworm missile with Sea Dart missiles. The Iraqi missile had targeted the US battleship USS Missouri and the intercept was the first validated, successful missile-versus-missile strike of its kind.

After a missile warning, both the USS Missouri and USS Jarrett fired flares and chaff to decoy the missile. Gloucester, drawing from the Royal Navy's experience during the Falklands War, when Exocet missiles sank the merchant ship Atlantic Conveyor after decoys were deployed, did not activate her own decoys. The Royal Navy considered missiles like the Silkworm as targets to be shot down and firing chaff made that action difficult. Gloucester initiated a hard turn, firing two Sea Darts "over her starboard shoulder". The entire engagement, from detection to destruction, took just 89 seconds. The interception range was between 2¾ and 4 nautical miles away from Gloucester, and 4 to 7 nautical miles away from Missouri. USS Jarrett‘s history listed the missile's altitude at 375 feet while witnesses aboard HMS London estimated between 680 and 1,000 feet.

Later, Missouri‘s 16-inch guns destroyed the Iraqi missile battery.

Gloucester avoided two naval mines, conducted boardings and the ship's Lynx helicopter destroyed several Iraqi warships including three fast attack craft, a T43 minelayer, and a Polnocny-class landing ship, with Sea Skua missiles. She spent the longest period in the combat area of any coalition warship and her captain (Commander Philip Wilcocks) and flight commander (Lt Cdr David Livingstone) were awarded the Distinguished Service Cross with the operations officer (Lt Cdr Ian McLaren MBE) and flight observer both mentioned in Despatches. After this service Gloucester was rebranded "The Fighting G", after the earlier HMS Gloucester, a Town-class cruiser, sunk by German aircraft, in May 1941.

=== Later deployments ===
In 1997, Gloucester took part in Ocean Wave 97. Ocean Wave lasted eight months, which saw her visit countries including Australia, New Zealand, Singapore and the UAE as well as taking part in the Five Power Defence Arrangements Exercise Flying Fish. She sailed as part of Task Group 327.01, under the flag of Commander United Kingdom Task Group, Rear Admiral Alan West, along with the flagship HMS Illustrious and other ships such as HMS Richmond and support ships. Part of the role of the Task Force was to oversee the peaceful handover of Hong Kong to the Chinese.

During the 2006 Israel-Lebanon conflict, Gloucester was the first Royal Navy vessel to evacuate British nationals from Beirut, berthing on 18 July 2006. She made three trips taking evacuees to Cyprus, and was the last Royal Navy ship to leave Beirut. She underwent a £6 million refit at Rosyth Dockyard in Fife, Scotland, in 2007. On the morning of 26 August 2010 she intercepted the yacht Tortuga, smuggling £4 million of cocaine, during Gloucester's voyage out to the Falkland Islands, where she was deployed from August 2010 to early 2011. On 20 September 2010 the government of Uruguay denied Gloucester access to Montevideo as a result of the Falkland Islands sovereignty dispute.

In May 2011, she took part in Exercise Saxon Warrior. As part of Saxon Warrior '11, on 21 May 2011, Carrier Strike Group 2's Truxtun and Mitscher joined the U.S. replenishment tanker Leroy Grumman and the Almirante Juan de Borbón in conducting a transit exercise, with Gloucester and frigate Westminster acting as hostile forces. This was the final deployment for Gloucester prior to her decommissioning.

== Decommissioning ==
Gloucester returned to HMNB Portsmouth for the final time on 24 May 2011 and was decommissioned on 30 June 2011, under the command of her last captain, Commander David George. On 22 September 2015 she left Portsmouth Harbour under tow, bound for a breaker's yard in Turkey. During her service she sailed 787,928 miles (1,268,047 km)

On decommissioning, Commander David George said:

"I cannot express how proud I am of the ship. It was a very emotional final entry for the very best of ships, but she is 29 years old, and with more than 750,000 miles [1.2m kilometres] under her belt. There are more capable Type 45 destroyers now taking the stage, and Gloucester’s time has come to bow out with dignity."

== Affiliations ==
The ship retains links with the Royal Gloucestershire, Berkshire and Wiltshire Regiment and the City of Gloucester. The ship's crest features a horseshoe, part of the city's Tudor arms.

- The Rifles
- City of Gloucester
- Worshipful Company of Grocers
- Gloucester R.F.C.
- 2nd Durrington Sea Scout Group
- Gloucester Royal Naval Association
- Milton Abbey Combined Cadet Force (CCF)

== Gallery ==
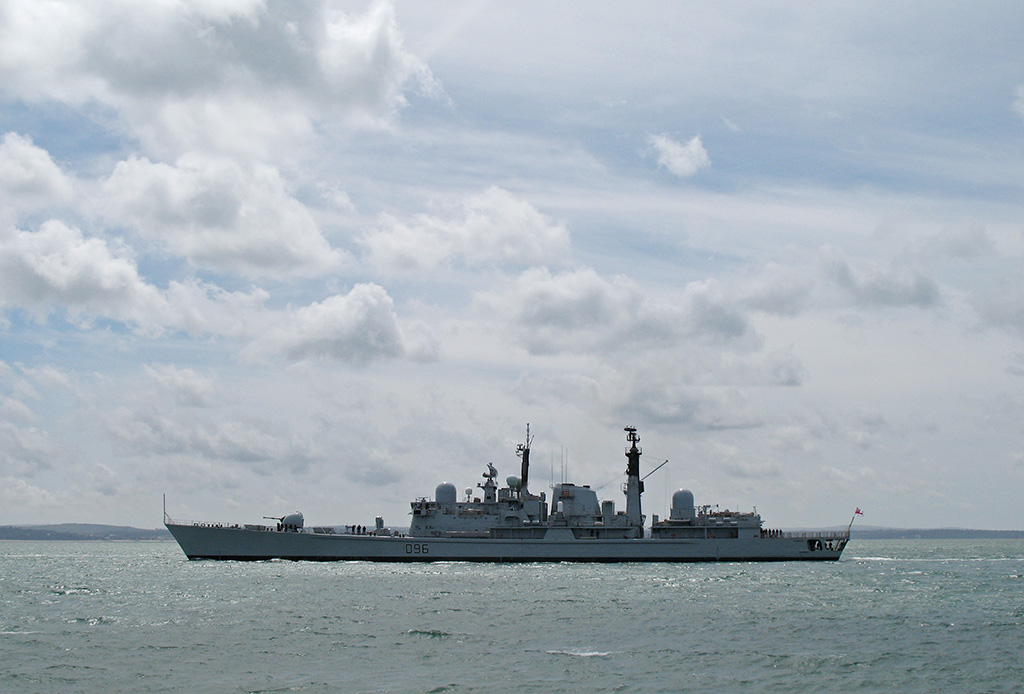
HMS Gloucester leaving Portsmouth

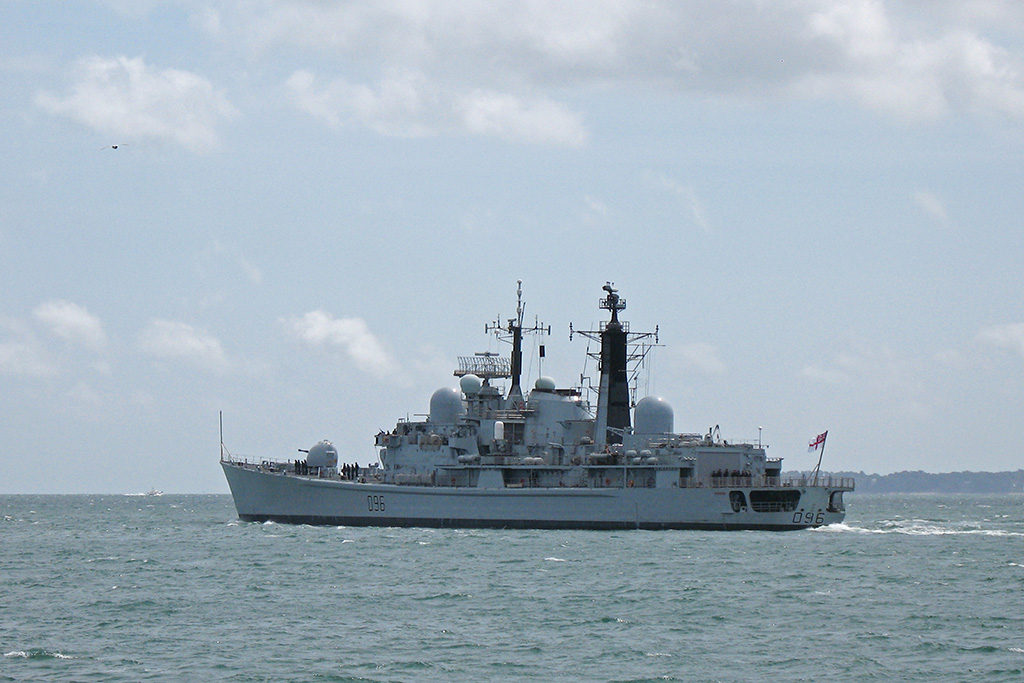
HMS Gloucester leaving Portsmouth
