= East Indies Station =

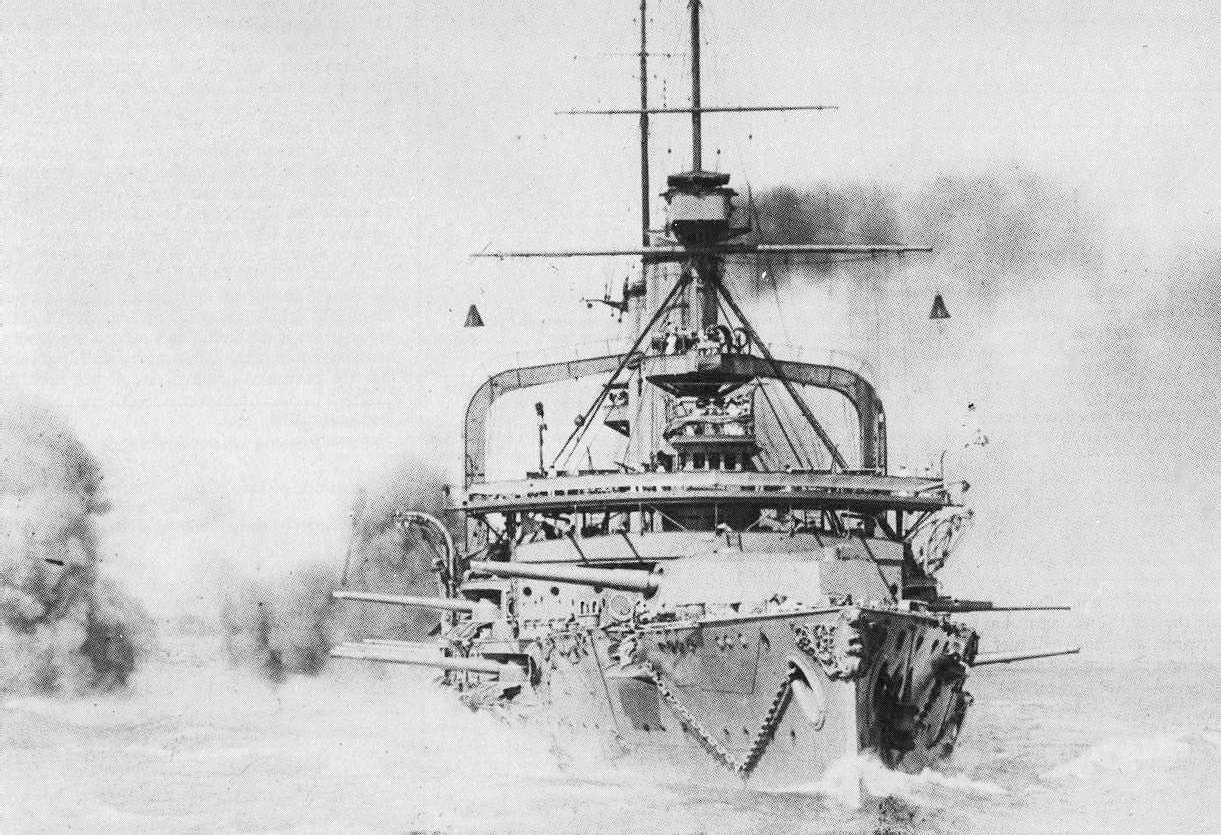
- HMS Swiftsure during gunnery practice on the East Indies Station in the summer of 1913
- Founded: 1744; 282 years ago
- Disbanded: 1958
- Country: United Kingdom
- Branch: Royal Navy
- Type: Naval station
- Part of: the Admiralty
- Headquarters: Royal Naval Dockyard, Trincomalee

Commanders
- Commander-in-Chief: Admiral Peter Rainier (longest serving)

The East Indies Station was a formation and command of the British Royal Navy. Created in 1744 by the Admiralty, it was under the command of the Commander-in-Chief, East Indies.

Even in official documents, the term East Indies Station was often used. In 1941, the ships of the China Squadron and East Indies Squadron were merged to form the Eastern Fleet under the control of the Commander-in-Chief, Eastern Fleet. The China Station then ceased as a separate command. The East Indies Station was disbanded in 1958.

It encompassed Royal Navy Dockyards and bases in East Africa, Middle East, India and Ceylon, and other ships not attached to other fleets. For many years under rear admirals, from the 1930s the Commander-in-Chief was often an Admiral or a Vice-Admiral.

== History ==
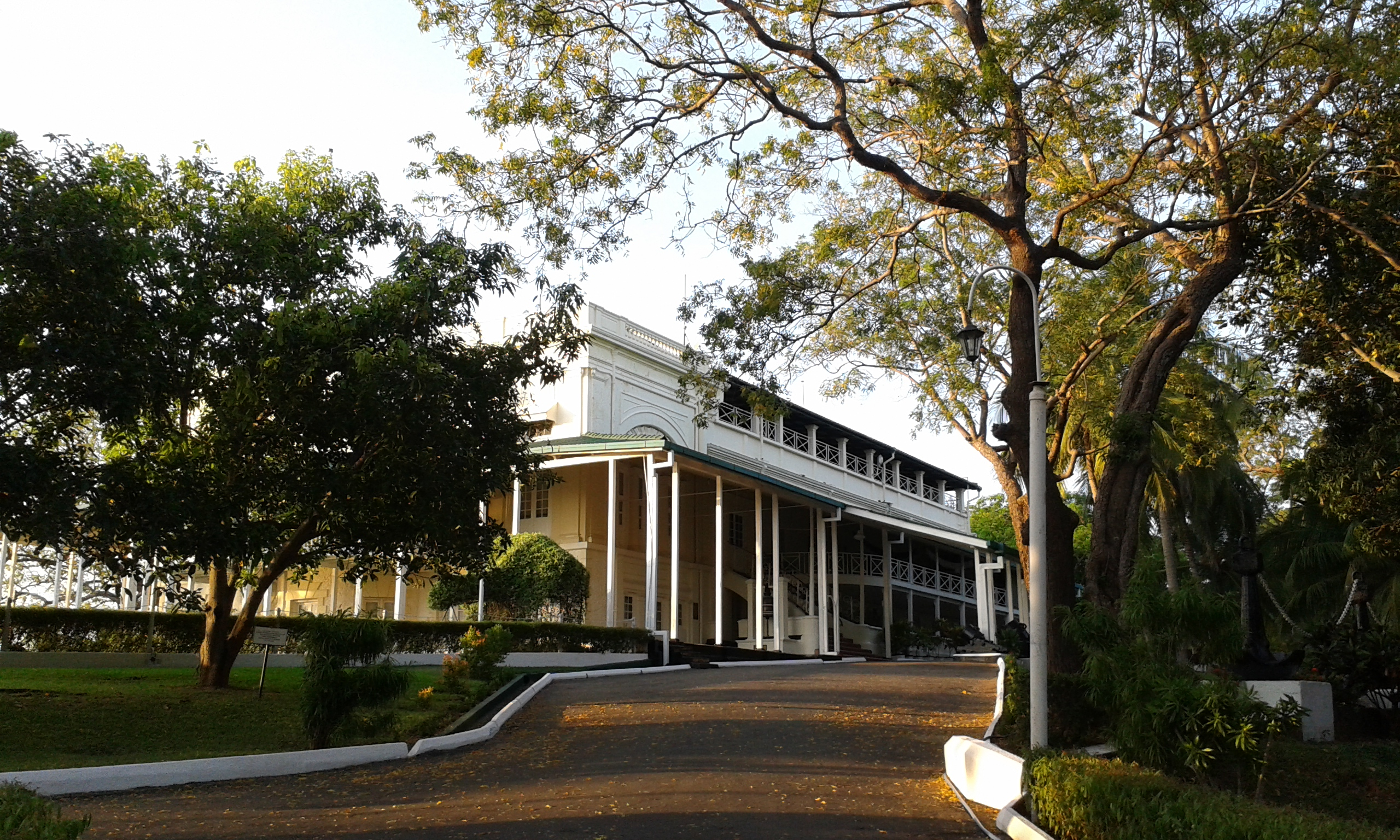
Navy House, Trincomalee, residence of the Commander-in-Chief, East Indies Station, from 1811 to 1942

The East Indies Station was established as a Royal Navy command in 1744. From 1831 to 1865, the East Indies and the China Station were a single command known as the East Indies and China Station. The East Indies Station, established in 1865, was responsible for British naval operations in the Indian Ocean (excluding the waters around the Dutch East Indies, South Africa and Australia) and included the Persian Gulf and the Red Sea. From 1913, the station was renamed the Egypt and East Indies Station until 1918.

== Anti-slavery activities in East Africa ==
During the 1850s and 1860s, the Royal Navy fought to suppress the slave trade operating out of Zanzibar up to the North Coast of the Arabian Sea. An East African Squadron, which was part of the East Indies Station, was active in suppressing slavery in 1869. The mission of Sir Bartle Frere in 1869 "produced... a recommendation that a guardship be permanently stationed off the Zanzibar coast." Britain's real intentions in East Africa was to stop other European naval powers from establishing any similar bases in the region, and the station's purpose was to protect British trade interests passing through the Western Indian Ocean. Rawley writes that Captain George Sulivan and his successor directed the activities of the old ship-of-the-line HMS London (1840), reequipped as both prison and hospital, with some success. London served as a base for cruisers operating against the slaving dhows, for four years.

By 1873, London was a hulk, serving as a depot ship in Zanzibar Bay, off the east coast of Africa. In March 1878, she was recommissioned and involved in the suppression of the slave trade in the area, serving as a central depot for many smaller steam screw boats; she functioned as a repair depot, a hospital and a storage ship. At this time, there were Africans from West Africa (Kroomen or Krumen) and East Africa (Seedies or Sidis) serving on board. There were also Zanzibari and Arab interpreters and cooks from Portuguese Goa (India). London was sold and broken up in 1884.

The East Indies Station had bases at Colombo, Trincomalee, Bombay, Basra and Aden.

== Second World War ==
In early May 1941, the Commander-in-Chief directed forces to support the pursuit of Pinguin, the German raider that eventually sank after the action of 8 May 1941 against HMS Cornwall. On 7 December, cruisers on the station included the heavy cruisers HMS Cornwall, Dorsetshire, and Exeter; the light cruisers Glasgow, Danae, Dauntless, Durban, Emerald and Enterprise (some sources also place the heavy cruiser Hawkins as being on station on that date, while others report her being under refit and repair in the UK between early November 1941 & May 1942), and six armed merchant cruisers. Also assigned to the station was 814 Naval Air Squadron at China Bay, Ceylon, which unit was at that time equipped with Fairey Swordfish torpedo bombers. Japanese threats, led to the East Indies Station merging with the China Station in December 1941, to form the Eastern Fleet. Later the Eastern Fleet became the East Indies Fleet. In 1952, after the Second World War ended, the East Indies Fleet became the Far East Fleet.

A separate Commander-in-Chief for the East Indies was reappointed. During the 1950s, the task for Royal Navy vessels in the East Indies "..was to deliver fighting power in support of British foreign policy, be that in major warfighting (Korea) or low intensity operations such as counterinsurgency (Malaya), and to offer a British military presence in support of national policy." But disagreement over Suez meant that the Ceylonese Government did not wish to let British naval forces use their bases in an emergency, and this policy was reaffirmed by the new government installed after the 1956 Ceylonese parliamentary election. The Navy Yard, and Admiralty House were handed over on 15 October 1957, the flag was lowered over the shore establishment HMS Highflyer, and the next day, 16 October 1957, the last flagship, HMS Ceylon, left Trincomalee. The station was temporarily relocated to Bahrain. The Senior Naval Officer, Persian Gulf was to become an independent commander with the title Commodore, Arabian Seas and Persian Gulf. "At nine o'clock on the morning of 7 September 1958, 'the flag of the one-hundredth Commander in Chief of the East Indies Station, Vice Admiral Sir Hilary Biggs, was hauled down over HMS Jufair,'" the Royal Navy base in Bahrain.

== Subordinate Commands ==
=== Flag Officer, East Africa ===
Originally established by the Royal Navy as East Coast of Africa Station (1862–1919) was administered by the Flag Officer, East Africa. This officer was subordinate to the Commander-in-Chief, East Indies Station, then later came under the Eastern Fleet from 1862, from April 1942 to September 1943, and then the command's name changed back to the East Indies station.

	Rank	Flag	Name	Term	Notes/Ref
Flag Officer, East Africa
1	Rear-Admiral	Rear-Admiral - Royal Navy	Charles G. Stuart	September, 1943 – 11 January 1944.	
4	Rear-Admiral	Rear-Admiral - Royal Navy	Richard Shelly Benyon	11 January 1944 - November 1944	
5	Commodore		Sir Philip Bowyer	November 1944 - 1945	

=== Royal Indian Navy ===
The Royal Indian Navy (RIN) was the naval force of British India and the Dominion of India from 1 May 1830 to 26 January 1950. It came under the East Indies Station at the outbreak of the Second World War on 3 September 1939. In December 1941 it came under the command of the new Eastern Fleet.

Vice-Admiral Sir Herbert Fitzherbert was the Flag Officer Commanding, Royal Indian Navy, from September 1939 to December 1941.

=== Red Sea ===
The Senior Naval Officer, Red Sea, was responsible to the Commander-in-Chief, East Indies, and during the Second World War for a period flew his flag afloat in HMS Egret.

At the beginning of the war, Rear Admiral A.J.L. Murray was Senior Officer, Red Sea Force.

On 21 October 1941, the title was changed to Flag Officer, Red Sea, and that officer was resubordinated to the Commander-in-Chief Mediterranean Fleet, until 17 May 1942. On 18 May 1942 the title was changed again to Flag Officer, Commanding Red Sea and Canal Area, and transferred again to the Eastern Fleet.

=== Persian Gulf ===
The Royal Navy's presence in the Persian Gulf was originally located at Basidu, Qishm Island, in Persia (c. 1850–1935), then later Juffair, Bahrain. It was commanded by the Senior Naval Officer, Persian Gulf. It included a naval base, depot and naval forces known as the Persian Gulf Patrol, then the Persian Gulf Squadron later called the Persian Gulf Division. It was a sub-command of the East Indies Station until 1958 when it was merged with the Red Sea Station under the new appointment of Commodore, Arabian Seas and Persian Gulf.

=== Naval officers, ports and bases ===
#	Location	In command	Dates	Notes
1	Aden	Naval Officer-in-Charge, Aden	1839 to 1917; 1921 to 1943; 1945	naval base/shore establishment
2	Addu Atoll	Naval Officer in Charge, Addu Atoll	1942 to 1945	fleet base
3	Calcutta	Naval Officer in Charge, Calcutta	1939 to 1945	during WW2 only normally under FOCOMM, Royal Indian Navy
4	Colombo	General Staff Officer, Colombo	1938 to 1939	
5	Diego Suarez	Naval Officer in Charge, Diego Suarez	1935 to 1945	fleet base
6	Kilidini, Mombasa	Senior British Naval Officer, Kilindini	1935 to 1945	shore establishment
7	Port Louis	Naval Officer-in-Charge, Port Louis	18	shore establishment
8	Port Sudan	Naval Officer-in-Charge, Port Sudan	1935 to 1945	
9	Seychelles	Naval Officer-in-Charge, Seychelles	1915 to 1945	fleet base
10	Tanganyika	Naval Officer-in-Charge, Tanganyika	1915 to 1945	
11	Trincomalee	Captain-in-Charge, Ceylon	1915 to 1945	
12	Zanzibar	Naval Officer-in-Charge, Zanzibar	1915 to 1945	

=== Subordinate naval formations ===
Naval Units	Based at	Date	Notes
4th Cruiser Squadron	Colombo/Trincomalee, Ceylon	August to December, 1916	
4th Light Cruiser Squadron	Colombo/Trincomalee, Ceylon	November 1918 to April 1919	
Arabian Bengal Ceylon Escort Force (ABCEF )	Aden, Colony of Aden	1941 to 1942	Under the Eastern Fleet command from April 1942 to November 1943.
East Indies and Egypt Seaplane Squadron	Port Said, Egypt	1916 to 1918	Royal Navy's first carrier squadron
Red Sea Division	Port Tawfik, Egypt	August 1914 to November 1918	
Red Sea Force	Port Tawfik, Egypt	April 1940 to 1944	Naval base HQ Red Sea Force
Persian Gulf Division	Basidu, Persia,(1818-1935), Ras Al-Jufair, Bahrain	1885 to 1958	
Persian Gulf Squadron	Basidu, Persia/ Ras Al-Jufair, Bahrain	1818 to- 1885	

== Shore establishments ==
#	Unit name	Location	Dates	Notes
1	Admiralty House	Trincomalee, Ceylon	1813 to 1958	Official residence of the Commander-in-Chief
2	HM Naval Dockyard, Trincomalee	Trincomalee, Ceylon	1813 to 1939, 1945-1958	Headquarters East Indies Station - HMS Highflyer
3	HMS Gloucester II	HM Naval Office, Colombo, Ceylon	1939-1945	Headquarters East Indies Station Also linked to Navy House, Colombo, Official residence of the Commander-in-Chief in Colombo.
4	HM Naval Dockyard, Madras	Madras, India	1796 to 1813	Headquarters, East Indies Station
5	HMS Anderson	Colombo, Ceylon	1939 to 1949	Electronic listening station of the Far East Combined Bureau built on Anderson Golf Club; reverted to previous use after war.
6	HM Naval Base, Basra	Basra, Iraq	1939 to 1949	Naval base
7	HM Naval Dockyard, Bombay	Bombay, India	1811 to 1958	naval base during WW2 known as HMS Braganza
8	HM Naval Base, Calcutta	Calcutta, India	1811 to 1958	Naval base during WW2 known as HMS Braganza
9	HMS Lanka	Colombo, Ceylon	1939 - 1958	Naval base and shore station
10	HMS Mauritius	Tombeau Bay, Mauritius	1810 to 1958	Telegraphic then Wireless Station
11	HM Naval Base, Port Jackson	Port Jackson, New South Wales	1785 to 1865	Naval base transferred to China Station
12	Port Louis	Port Louis, Mauritius	1810 to 1968	Naval base
13	HM Naval Base, Port Tawfik	Port Tawfik, Red Sea, Egypt	August 1914 to 1944	Naval base HQ Red Sea, Patrol/Division/Force
14	HMS Sheba	Steamer Point (now Tawahi) in Aden	Example	Naval and shore base till 1958
15	RNAS China Bay	Trincomalee, Ceylon	1938 to 1945	Air Station HMS Bambara
16	RNAS Colombo Racecourse	Prince of Wales Island, George Town, Penang	1943 to 1945	Naval air station - HMS Bherunda
17	RNAS Katukurunda	Katukurunda, Ceylon	1938 to 1945	Naval air station - HMS Ukussa
18	RNAS Mackinnon Road	Mackinnon Road, Kenya, East Africa	1942 to 1944	Naval air station - HMS Tana then HMS Kipanga II
19	RNAS Puttalam	Puttalam Ceylon	1942 to 1944	Naval air station - HMS Rajaliya
20	RNAS Port Reitz	Port Reitz, Mombasa, Kenya	1942 to 1944	Naval air station, Aircraft Repair Yard, Reserve aircraft storage - HMS Tana then HMS Kipanga II HQ of Commdre-in-Charge, NAS, (Eastern Stations.).
21	RNAS Tanga	Tanga Tanganyika	1942 to 1944	Naval air station - HMS Kilele

== Commanders ==
No = died in post

=== Commander-in-Chief, East Indies ===
Prior to 1862, flag officers were appointed to coloured squadrons. Command flags are shown below. See: Royal Navy ranks, rates, and uniforms of the 18th and 19th centuries.

Post holders included:

Rank	Ensign	Name	Term	Ref
Commander-in-Chief, East Indies Station
Commodore		Curtis Barnett No	1744–1746	
Commodore		Thomas Griffin	1746–1748	(Note: Thomas Griffin promoted later Rear- then Vice-Admiral)
Rear-Admiral		Edward Boscawen	1748–1750	
Commodore		William Lisle	1750–1752	
Commodore		Joseph Knight	1752–1754	
Rear-Admiral		Charles Watson No	1754–1757	(Note: Charles Watson promoted later to Vice-Admiral)
Vice-Admiral		George Pocock	1757–1759	(Note: George Pocock appointed Vice-Admiral of the White, February 1757, Ref:Harrison. Simon, (2010-2018))
Commodore		Charles Steevens No	1760–1761	(Note: Charles Steevens promoted later to Rear-Admiral)
Rear-Admiral		Samuel Cornish	1761–1763	(Note: Samuel Cornish promoted later to Vice-Admiral)
Commodore		John Tinker	1763–1765	
Captain		John Byron	1765–1766	(Note: Byron's appointment was initially a subterfuge, designed to provide apparent legitimacy for a voyage along the coast of Spanish South America and around the Cape of Good Hope. Byron's true mission was to establish a British naval presence on an uninhabited island off Spanish South America, which he achieved via landings on the Falkland Islands in December 1764.)
Captain		Philip Affleck	1766–1767	
Commodore		John (later Sir John) Lindsay	1769–1772	
Rear-Admiral		Sir Robert Harland, 1st Baronet	1771–1775	
Commodore		Edward Hughes	1773–1777	
Commodore		Sir Edward Vernon	1776–1780	(Note: Edward Vernon promoted later to Rear-Admiral)
Rear-Admiral		Sir Edward Hughes	1780–1784	(Note: Edward Hughes, second term as Commander-in-Chief)
Vice-Admiral		Sir Hyde Parker, 5th Baronet No	1782	(Note: Hyde Parker appointed 1782 but lost at sea on his way out)
Commodore		Andrew Mitchell	1784–1785	
Commodore		Charles Hughes	1785–1787	
Commodore		William Cornwallis	1788–1794	
Commodore		Peter Rainier	1794–1805	
Vice-Admiral		Sir George Elphinstone	1795	(Note: Elphinstone went to capture the Dutch East Indies in 1795 but Rainier had already done it)
Rear-Admiral		Sir Edward Pellew, 1st Baronet	1804–1809	(Note: Pellew was later promoted to Rear-Admiral of the Red, 9 November 1805)
Rear-Admiral		Sir Thomas Troubridge, 1st Baronet No	1805–1807	(Note: Troughbridge served jointly with Edward Pellew)
Rear-Admiral		William O'Bryen Drury No	1809–1811	
Vice-Admiral		Sir Samuel Hood, 1st Baronet No	1811–1814	(Note: Samuel Hood appointed Vice-Admiral of the White, 4 June 1814, Harrison, 2010-2018)
Commodore		George Sayer	1814	
Rear-Admiral		Sir George Burlton No	1815	
Rear-Admiral		Sir Richard King, 2nd Baronet	1816–1820	(Note: Richard King appointed Rear-Admiral of the White, 4 June 1814 ref: Harrison, Simon (2010-2018))
Rear-Admiral		Sir Henry Blackwood, 1st Baronet	1820–1822	(Note: Henry Blackwood appointed Rear-Admiral of the Blue, July 1819 ref: Harrison, Simon (2010-2018))
Commodore		Charles Grant No	1822–1824	
Commodore		Sir James Brisbane No	1825–1826	
Rear-Admiral		Joseph Bingham No	1825	(Note: Joseph Bingham appointed 1825 but died before taking up post)
Rear-Admiral		William Hall Gage	1825–1829	
Rear-Admiral		Edward Owen	1829–1832	

=== C-in-C, East Indies and China Station ===
Note: for the period 1832–1865.

=== C-in-C, East Indies & Cape of Good Hope Station ===
Post holders included:

Rank	Flag	Name	Term
Commander-in-Chief, East Indies & Cape of Good Hope Station
Commodore		Frederick Montresor	(1865)
Commodore		Charles Hillyar	(1865–1867)

=== C-in-C, East Indies Station ===
Rank	Flag	Name	Term
Commander-in-Chief, East Indies Station
Rear-Admiral	Rear-Admiral - Royal Navy	Leopold Heath	(1867–1870)
Rear-Admiral	Rear-Admiral - Royal Navy	James Cockburn No	(1870–1872)
Rear-Admiral	Rear-Admiral - Royal Navy	Arthur Cumming	(1872–1875)
Rear-Admiral	Rear-Admiral - Royal Navy	Reginald Macdonald	(1875–1877)
Rear-Admiral	Rear-Admiral - Royal Navy	John Corbett	(1877–1879)
Rear-Admiral	Rear-Admiral - Royal Navy	William Gore Jones	(1879–1882)
Rear-Admiral	Rear-Admiral - Royal Navy	William Hewett	(1882–1885)
Rear-Admiral	Rear-Admiral - Royal Navy	Frederick Richards	(1885–1888)
Rear-Admiral	Rear-Admiral - Royal Navy	Edmund Fremantle	(1888–1891)
Rear-Admiral	Rear-Admiral - Royal Navy	Frederick Robinson	(1891–1892)
Rear-Admiral	Rear-Admiral - Royal Navy	William Kennedy	(1892–1895)
Rear-Admiral	Rear-Admiral - Royal Navy	Edmund Drummond	(1895–1898)
Rear-Admiral	Rear-Admiral - Royal Navy	Archibald Douglas	(1898–1899)
Rear-Admiral	Rear-Admiral - Royal Navy	Day Bosanquet	(1899–1902)
Rear-Admiral	Rear-Admiral - Royal Navy	Charles Drury	(1902–1903)
Rear-Admiral	Rear-Admiral - Royal Navy	George Atkinson-Willes	(1903–1905)
Rear-Admiral	Rear-Admiral - Royal Navy	Edmund Poë	(1905–1907)
Rear-Admiral	Rear-Admiral - Royal Navy	Sir George Warrender	(1907–1909)
Rear-Admiral	Rear-Admiral - Royal Navy	Edmond Slade	(1909–1912)
Rear-Admiral	Rear-Admiral - Royal Navy	Alexander Bethell	(1912-1913)

=== C-in-C, East Indies and Egypt Station ===
Note:The post was sometimes styled as Senior Naval Officer, Egypt, and Commander-in-Chief, East Indies Station.

Rank	Flag	Name	Term
Commander-in-Chief, East Indies and Egypt Station
Rear-Admiral	Rear-Admiral - Royal Navy	Sir Richard Peirse	(1913–1915)
Rear-Admiral	Rear-Admiral - Royal Navy	Rosslyn Wemyss	(1916–1917)

=== C-in-C, East Indies Station ===
Rank	Flag	Name	Term
Commander-in-Chief, East Indies Station
Rear-Admiral	Rear-Admiral - Royal Navy	Ernest Gaunt	(1917–1919)
Rear-Admiral	Rear-Admiral - Royal Navy	Hugh Tothill	(1919–1921)
Rear-Admiral	Rear-Admiral - Royal Navy	Lewis Clinton-Baker	(1921–1923)
Rear-Admiral	Rear-Admiral - Royal Navy	Herbert Richmond	(1923–1925)
Rear-Admiral	Rear-Admiral - Royal Navy	Walter Ellerton	(1925–1927)
Rear-Admiral	Rear-Admiral - Royal Navy	Bertram Thesiger	(1927–1929)
Rear-Admiral	Rear-Admiral - Royal Navy	Eric Fullerton	(1929–1932)
Rear-Admiral	Rear-Admiral - Royal Navy	Martin Dunbar-Nasmith	(1932–1934)
Vice-Admiral	Vice-Admiral - Royal Navy	Frank Rose	(1934–1936)
Vice-Admiral	Vice-Admiral - Royal Navy	Alexander Ramsay	(1936–1938)
Vice-Admiral	Vice-Admiral - Royal Navy	James Somerville	(1938–1939)
Admiral	Admiral - Royal Navy	Sir Ralph Leatham	(1939–1941)
Vice-Admiral	Vice-Admiral - Royal Navy	Geoffrey Arbuthnot	(1941–1942)
Admiral	Admiral - Royal Navy	Sir Geoffrey Layton	(1942–1944)
Vice-Admiral	Vice-Admiral - Royal Navy	Sir Arthur Power	(1944–1945)
Admiral	Admiral - Royal Navy	Sir Arthur Palliser	(1946–1948)
Vice-Admiral	Vice-Admiral - Royal Navy	Sir Charles Woodhouse	(1948–1950)
Admiral	Admiral - Royal Navy	Sir Geoffrey Oliver	(1950–1952)
Admiral	Admiral - Royal Navy	Sir William Slayter	(1952–1954)
Vice-Admiral	Vice-Admiral - Royal Navy	Sir Charles Norris	(1954–1956)
Vice-Admiral	Vice-Admiral - Royal Navy	Sir Hilary Biggs	(1956–1958)

== Chief of Staff 1939-41 ==
Included:

Rank	Flag	Name	Term
Chief of Staff, East Indies Station/Eastern Fleet
Captain		Frederick Rodney Garside	3 January 1939 – June 1941
Rear-Admiral	Rear-Admiral - Royal Navy	Arthur F. E. Palliser	June–December 1941

Note: Under East Indies Station briefly when the Eastern Fleet its established Rear-Admiral Palliser becomes COS to C-in-C, Eastern Fleet.

== See also ==
- List of fleets and major commands of the Royal Navy
- List of Eastern Fleet ships
