= Ted Briggs =

English seaman, "Hood" survivor (1923–2008)

Ted Briggs MBE
- Briggs in 2000
- Born: Albert Edward Pryke Briggs; 1 March 1923; Redcar, North Riding of Yorkshire, England
- Died: 4 October 2008 (aged 85); Portsmouth, Hampshire, England
- Military career
- Allegiance: United Kingdom
- Branch: Royal Navy
- Service years: 1938–1973
- Rank: Lieutenant
- Ship(s): HMS Hood
- Conflicts: Second World War; Battle of the Atlantic; Battle of the Denmark Strait; Korean War; Suez Crisis
- Awards: Member of the Order of the British Empire; Mentioned in Despatches
- Other work: President of HMS Hood Association

Albert Edward Pryke Briggs (1 March 1923 – 4 October 2008) was an English seaman and one of only three survivors from the loss of the battlecruiser HMS Hood in 1941. He remained in the Royal Navy after the Second World War and was later commissioned, serving a total of 35 years by the time of his retirement in 1973. He was the final Hood survivor to die.

== Early life ==
Briggs was born on 1 March 1923 in Redcar, North Riding of Yorkshire. He and his sister were raised there and later in Derby by their mother; Briggs was never to know his father. He first saw Hood at anchor off the River Tees when he was 12 and volunteered to join the Royal Navy the following day. He was told he would have to wait until he was 15, so it was on 7 March 1938, one week after his 15th birthday, that he finally joined the navy.

== Naval service ==
Briggs was trained at HMS Ganges for 16 months. After his training he was delighted to be assigned to HMS Hood which he joined on 29 July 1939. He initially served as an officers' messenger.

=== Sinking of Hood ===
Soon after the Second World War began, Hood was assigned to patrol and escort duty in the North Atlantic and also served as part of Force H in the Mediterranean Sea. In May 1941, Hood was dispatched with HMS Prince of Wales to intercept the German battleship Bismarck in the Denmark Straits. The German ship was 20 years newer and heavier than Hood and as fast as her; she had a modern main armament with up-to-date fire control and superior armour. The battlecruiser encountered Bismarck and engaged her at long range. Bismarck returned fire and destroyed Hood, killing all aboard except for Briggs and two others. The Battle of the Denmark Strait and the loss of Hood were regarded by the British public as one of the greatest disasters to befall the Royal Navy during the war. Prince of Wales survived, only to be sunk by Japanese bombers in December 1941.

Briggs, on the compass platform near the bridge, recalled not hearing the initial explosion; rather, there was only a huge sheet of flame that shot around the compass platform, followed by a heavy list, initially to starboard then to port. When the list reached 30 degrees Briggs realised that "she was not coming back". Briggs states that no order was given to abandon ship, saying that "It just wasn't necessary," and that he found himself in the water about 50 yards (50 m) from Hood as her B-Turret went under after he made it only halfway down the ladder leading to the bridge. As Briggs and the remaining crew on the compass platform struggled to escape, Briggs remembered "The flag Lieutenant who was just in front of me stood to one side to let me go through ... I'll never forget that." He also could remember how the compass master had stood on the platform "tall and fearless" as the water pulled him down. Briggs himself attempted to swim away from the vessel but was pulled under by her as she started toward the ocean bottom. Briggs remembers struggling to stay afloat, giving up hope, and then miraculously being propelled to the surface. He recalls: "I turned and fifty yards away I could see the bows of the Hood vertical in the sea. It was the most frightening aspect of my ordeal and a vision which was to recur terrifyingly in nightmares for the next forty years. Both gun barrels of B turret were slumped hard over to port and disappearing fast beneath the waves. My experience of suction seconds before forced me to turn in sheer terror and swim as fast and as far as I could away from the last sight of the ship that had formulated my early years".

After Hood sank, Briggs got aboard a Denton raft from the ship and saw only two other survivors, Bob Tilburn and Bill Dundas, who boarded some rafts as well. Briggs paddled his raft to the other two survivors and stayed by their sides, holding their hands and singing popular British songs to keep them conscious. After three hours, and about to pass out from hypothermia, the three survivors were rescued by HMS Electra.

The three were the only survivors of the sinking; 1,415 were confirmed lost. In both publications and recorded interviews, Briggs refers to the sacrifice made by the squadron's navigating officer, Commander John Warrand, who stood aside and allowed him to exit the compass platform first. Briggs also confirms that the squadron commanding officer, Vice Admiral Lancelot Holland, was last seen still sitting utterly dejected in his admiral's chair, making no attempt to escape.

=== Later career ===
After the loss of Hood, Briggs spent more than a week being looked after by his mother before being assigned to HMS Mercury. He gave evidence to the second inquiry into the loss of Hood. Briggs was then transferred to HMS Royal Arthur and then to the requisitioned merchantman HMS Hilary. Hilary served as a Combined Operations Headquarters ship at Salerno and had the same role during the D-Day landings. Later, Briggs served aboard HMS Mercury as a fleetwork instructor. He was promoted first to leading signalman in March 1942 and then yeoman of signals in March 1943. Briggs remained in the Royal Navy after the end of the war and witnessed the troubles in Palestine from 1945–48 and served in the Korean War. He had become a communications officer, serving on board HMS Ceylon by the time of the Suez Crisis of 1956.

== Retirement ==
Briggs retired on 2 February 1973, with the rank of lieutenant, settled in the south of England and worked in Fareham as a furnished lettings manager. In the year he retired, at the Queen's Birthday Honours he was appointed a Member of the Order of the British Empire. In 1975, Briggs joined the HMS Hood Association as one of its youngest members and was elected as its first president. In 1995, Briggs again served as president of the organisation. He met Bismarck survivors on a number of occasions.

He regularly told his story as a guest-speaker, lecturer and subject of historical television and radio documentaries. In July 2001, Briggs visited the wreck site and released a plaque which commemorates the lost crew of the Hood. He was co-author of a book on the subject, titled Flagship "Hood": The Fate of Britain's Mightiest Warship. Briggs recorded a ninety-minute oral history with the Imperial War Museum, which is available on its website.

== Death ==
Briggs was married twice but had no children. He died in the Queen Alexandra Hospital, Portsmouth, on 4 October 2008 at the age of 85.

== Military service ==
- July 1939 – May 1941: HMS Hood
- 1941 to possibly 1943: shore establishments HMS Mercury and HMS Royal Arthur
- 1943–1944: HMS Hilary, including Salerno and Normandy
- October 1945: HMS Brissenden – Palestine patrols
- April 1948: HMS Mercury as fleetwork instructor
- February 1949: HMS Maidstone – 2nd Submarine Squadron
- October 1949: HMS Mercury – cryptographic instructor
- February 1950: HMS Ceylon – Korean War
- July 1952: HMS Mercury – signal instructors course
- January 1953: rated as chief yeoman of signals served at CinC EASTLANT (Commander-in-Chief, Eastern Atlantic Area, NATO) Communications Centre
- November 1953: HMS Indefatigable and HMS Theseus training squadron as training chief yeoman
- December 1955: commissioned officer. HMS Mercury – commissioned communication officer course
- July 1956: promoted to commissioned communication officer
- September 1956: HMS Ceylon as a signals officer – Suez Crisis
- May 1958: HMS Mercury
- January 1959: HMS Sea Eagle (Derry) as assistant base communications officer
- December 1960: HMS Mercury – new entry training officer
- April 1961: promoted to lieutenant
- February 1963: assigned to HMS Loch Killisport as communications officer – 3rd Frigate Squadron
- June 1964: Whitehall Wireless Station as rating control officer
- October 1966: HMS Ganges as communications officer
- June 1969: HMNB Devonport as officer in charge of the Signal Training Centre
- January 1971: HMS Excellent (Whale Island) as officer in charge of the Leading Rates Leadership School

== Awards and honors ==
In addition to being appointed a Member of the Order of the British Empire, Lieutenant Briggs's medals included:

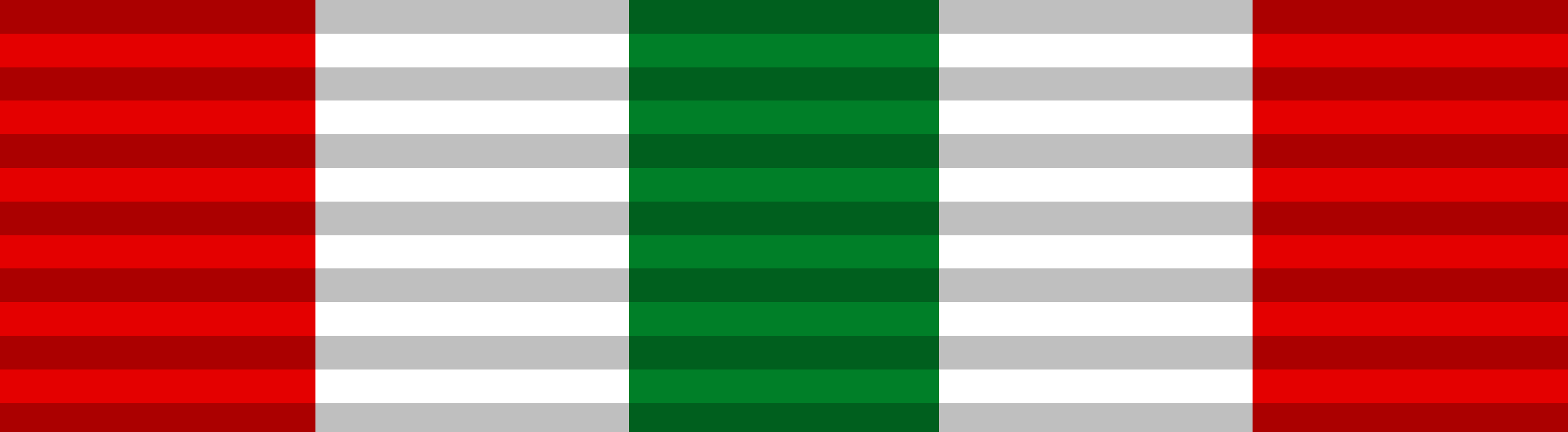

Member of the Order of the British Empire (1974)
1939–1945 Star	Atlantic Star with "France and Germany" clasp	Italy Star
War Medal 1939–1945 with mention in despatches device	Naval General Service Medal with "Palestine 1945–48" and "Near East" clasps	Korea Medal
United Nations Korea Medal	General Service Medal with "Borneo" clasp	Naval Long Service and Good Conduct Medal
