= History of the Sri Lanka Navy =

== Beginning and World War II ==
Naval Ensign of the Royal Ceylon Navy (1950-1972).

In January 1938 the Ceylon Naval Volunteer Force (CNVF) was created with Commander W. G. Beauchamp as Commanding Officer. On 31 August 1939, the CNVF was mobilized for war duties. Three years later, the CNVF was offered to, and accepted by the Royal Navy (RN) as a Volunteer Reserve, the "Ceylon Royal Naval Volunteer Reserve", or CRNVR. It continued under RN operational and administrative command until March 1946. With the end of the war, it reverted to Ceylon Government Control, though yet CRNVR in name. In the 1939–1946 period, the CRNVR carried out several operational duties, mainly at sea. Cutting its teeth on the Port Commission tugs Samson and Goliath, it later crewed and operated trawlers and Antarctic whalers converted as minesweepers and fitted out with guns, submarine detection equipment and anti-submarine weaponry. They were HMS Overdale Wyke (the first ship to be purchased by the Government of Ceylon), HMS Okapi, HMS Semla, HMS Sambhur, HMS Hoxa, HMS Balta and HM Tugs Barnet and C 405. In addition the CRNVR crewed several motor fishing vessels (MFV), harbour defence motor launch (HDML) and miscellaneous auxiliary vessels. All were crewed exclusively by CRNVR personnel. These ships were meant to sweep and guard the approaches of the harbors but were often used on extended missions outside Ceylon waters. In the course of these operations, the ships came under enemy fire, recovered essential information from Japanese aircraft that were shot down, sailed to Akyab after the Burma front was opened in two FMVs for harbour duties and, was called upon to accept the surrender of the Italian light cruiser Eritrea and escort her to port with a prize crew on board.

=== Royal Ceylon Navy ===
After independence from British rule in 1948, the government believed an island nation should possess a strong navy to be it first line of defense. Therefore, on 9 December 1950 the Royal Ceylon Navy was created, with Ceylon Royal Naval Volunteer Reserve forming the nucleus. The first warship was commissioned HMCyS Vijaya, an Algerine-class minesweeper, ex-HMS Flying Fish along with other patrol boats and tugs. Later the fleet was expanded with HMCyS Parakram, another Algerine-class minesweeper (ex-HMS Pickle), two Canadian-built River-class frigates HMCyS Mahasena (ex-HMS Violetta, HMCS Orkney and ex-Israeli ship Mivtach), HMCyS Gajabahu (ex-HMCS Hallowell, ex-Israeli Misnak) and oceangoing tug (ex-HMS Adept). During the 1971 insurrection the navy sent its sailors for combat operations against the insurgents.

In 1972 the "Dominion of Ceylon" became the "Democratic Socialist Republic of Sri Lanka", and the Royal Ceylon Navy became the Sri Lanka Navy. The naval ensign along with the flag officers' flags were redesigned.

=== Recent years ===
At the beginning of the civil war in the 1980s the navy found itself poorly equipped to face the new threats the LTTE created. But this was soon overcome by increasing the fleet of patrol boats and the introduction of fast attack crafts. These proved highly successful in limiting the LTTE's use of the seas. The weapon systems on these were upgraded with time as the sea tigers resorted to using sophisticated suicide crafts against naval vessels.

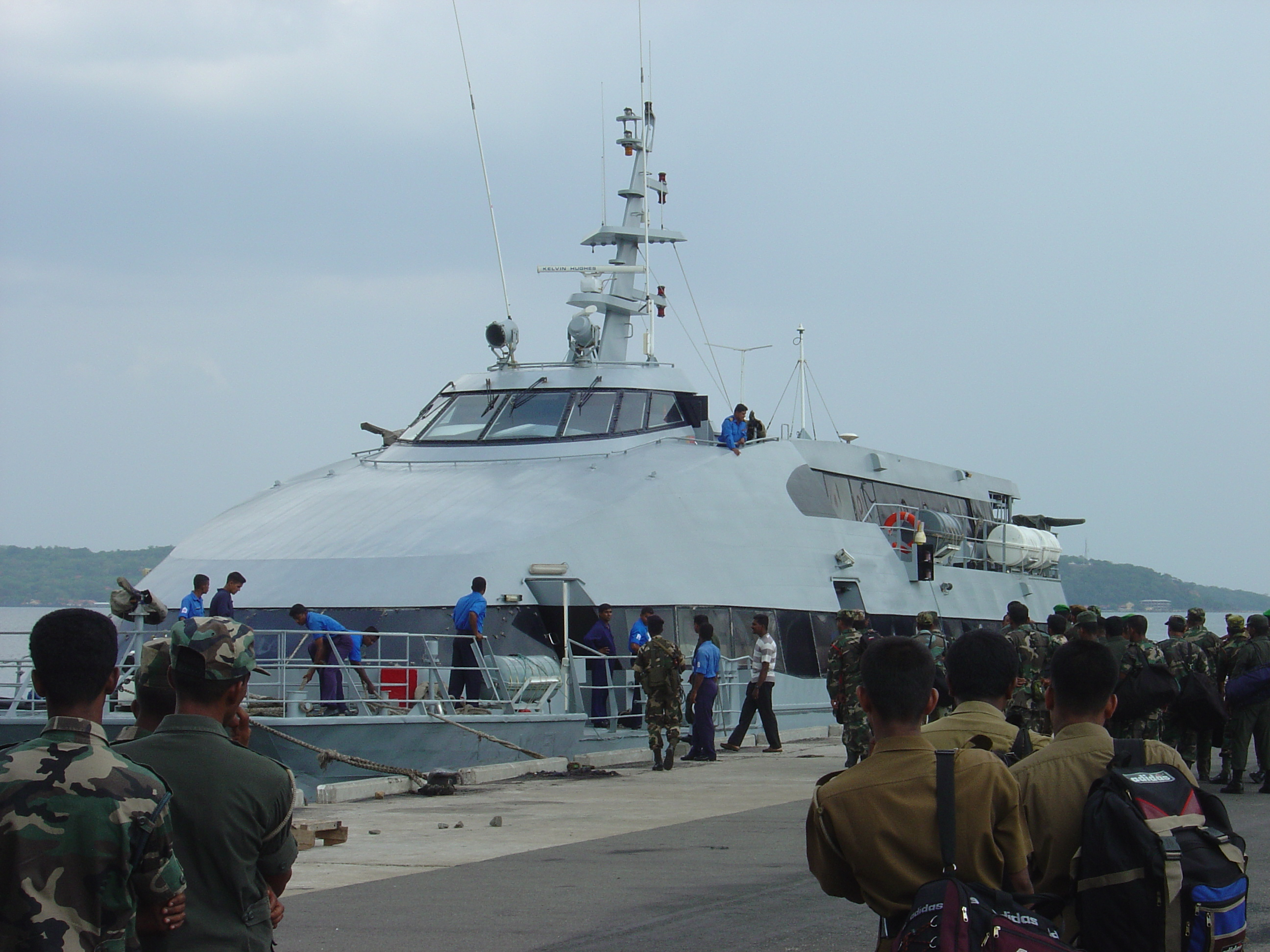
Sri Lankan Navy troop transport ship

During this time the navy took part in its first amphibious operation in its history. The size of the force along with the fleet increased in the years of war. In the early 1980s a land combat force was created which at first limited itself to base defense and as its numbers increased took part in offensive operations against rebel forces along with the Sri Lankan Army. An elite naval special forces unit called the Special Boat Squadron was created in the late 80's based on the British Special Boat Service. In 2000 the Navy started a fleet air arm (FAA) by acquiring a HAL Chetak from India. Today the FAA operates from the two offshore patrol vessels of the fleet. At present conventional warfare capability is increased by the addition of missile corvettes.
