= Thomas Rodrigo =

Ceylonese entrepreneur

Mudaliyar Thomas Rodrigo (11 April 1868 – 7 October 1945) was a Ceylonese entrepreneur. He was the owner of the Pagado Tea Rooms.

Rodrigo was born in Panadura to Jeronimus Rodrigo and Prolentina Soysa; his grandfather was Anthony Rodrigo, a Patabendi Mahathmaya. He was the youngest of four brothers. He received his education at Prince of Wales College, Moratuwa.

Following his schooling, he entered public service as a Clerk in the Attorney General's Department in the Solicitor General's staff. He went on to serve as the Chief Clerk, until his early retirement. He thereafter moved into business in the plantations sector, having purchased Rock Cave Estate in Walgama. He then purchased a share of ownership of the restaurant Pagoda Tea Rooms in Chatham Street, Fort. The British Government of Ceylon granted him the titular honor of Mudaliyar. He was a member of the Board of Management of the Colombo YMBA and the Sri Sumangala College.

He married Emily Roslyn Fernando from Beruwela and had three sons, Cyril, Percy and Leslie, and five daughters, Gertrude, Rita, Beatrice, Ena and Ethel. His son Cyril Rodrigo carried on the family business and founded Cyril Rodrigo Restaurants, which started the Green Cabin franchise in Sri Lanka. His son-in-law was Vice Admiral Asoka de Silva, who served as the Commander of the Sri Lanka Navy from 1983 to 1986 and Sri Lankan Ambassador to Cuba.

== See also ==
- List of political families in Sri Lanka

== External links and references ==
- The Rodrigo Ancestry
