= William E. Banks (Royal Navy officer) =

Commander of the Ceylon Navy

Captain W. E. Banks CBE DSC
- Born: William Eric Banks; 17 July 1900; Northwood, Middlesex, England
- Died: 1 November 1986 (aged 86); Gloucestershire
- Military career
- Allegiance: United Kingdom; Ceylon
- Branch: Royal Navy; Royal Ceylon Navy
- Rank: Captain
- Commands: Commander of the Royal Ceylon Navy

William Eric Banks (17 July 1900 – 1 November 1986) was a British Royal Navy officer who was the first Commander of the Royal Ceylon Navy. He was appointed on 2 December 1950 until 25 November 1951. He was succeeded by J. R. S. Brown.

In 1940, Banks was awarded the DSC. He was appointed a Commander of the Order of the British Empire "for courage and undaunted devotion to duty."

Military offices
Preceded by Royce de Mel	Commander of the Royal Ceylon Navy; 1950-1951	Succeeded by J. R. S. Brown
