= SLN Dockyard =

Sri Lankan naval base

Sri Lanka Navy Dockyard
- Trincomalee, Eastern Province in Sri Lanka
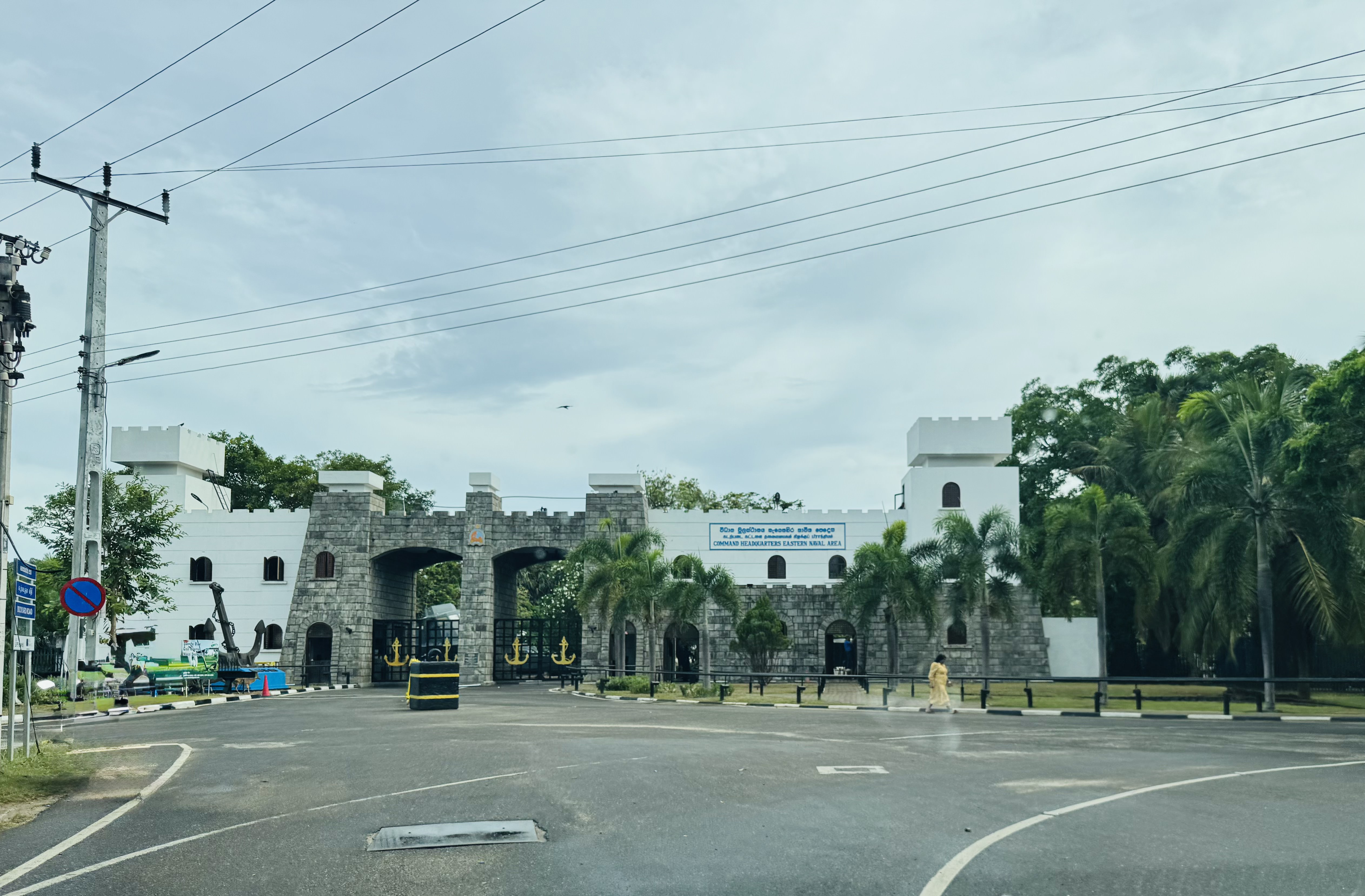
- Eastern Naval Command

Site information
- Type: Naval Base
- Owner: (Sri Lanka) Ministry of Defence
- Controlled by: Sri Lanka Navy

Location
- Location of SLN Dockyard in Sri Lanka
- Coordinates: 8°33′08.5″N 81°14′16.6″E

Site history
- In use: 1948 – present

Sri Lanka Navy (SLN) Dockyard is the largest naval base of the Sri Lanka Navy and a major shipyard located in Trincomalee, Sri Lanka. Established by the British as the Royal Naval Dockyard, Trincomalee, it was home to the East Indies Station of the Royal Navy during World War II. Since the withdrawal of the Royal Navy, the Royal Ceylon Navy took over the dockyard. It became the home base of the RCyN fleet, and today it is home to the Eastern Naval Command and the Naval and Maritime Academy of the Sri Lanka Navy.

== History ==
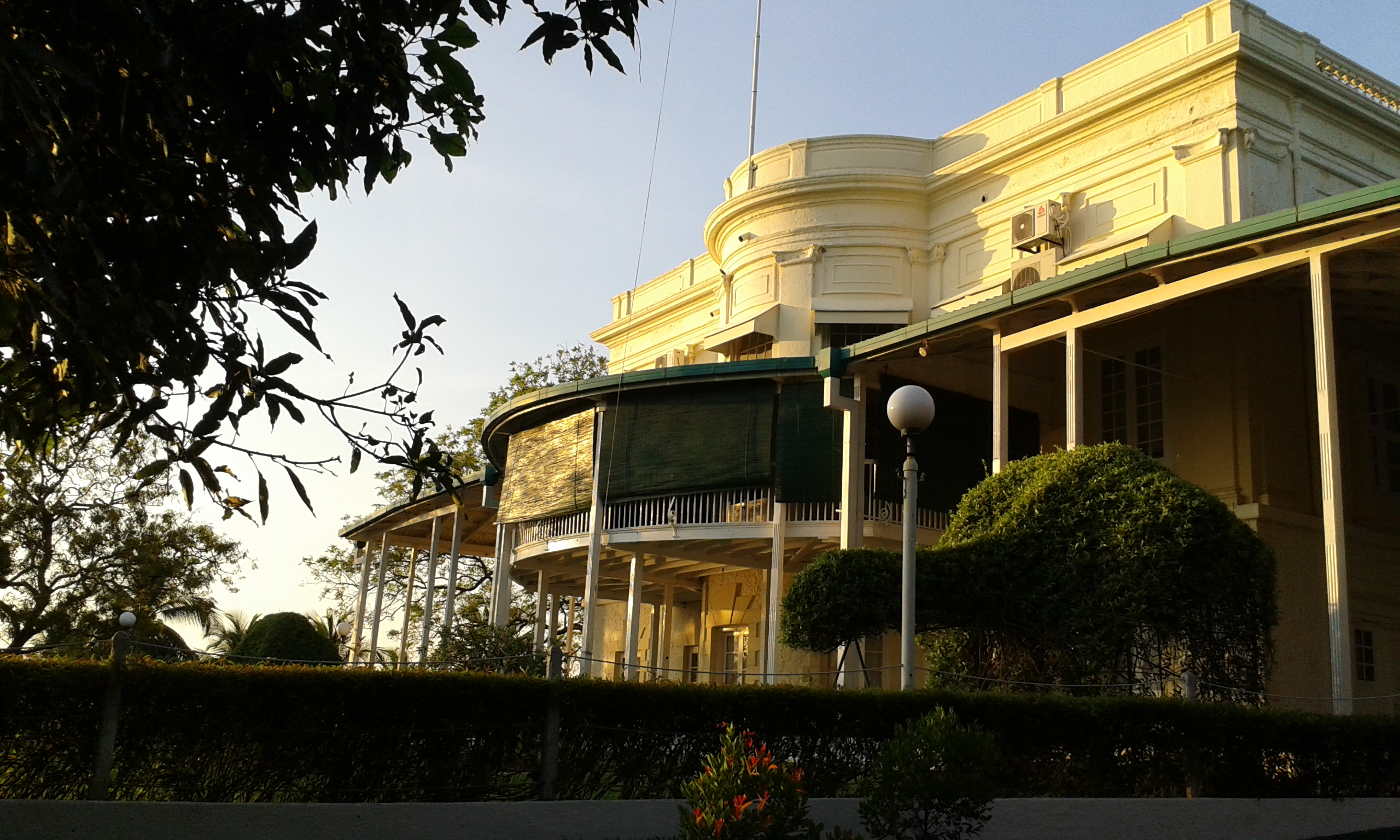
Navy House official residence of the Commander of the Sri Lanka Navy, located in SLN Dockyard

Trincomalee is a natural deep-water harbour that has attracted seafarers like Marco Polo, Ptolemy and traders from China and East Asia since ancient times. Trinco, as it is commonly called, has been a sea port since the days of the ancient Sri Lankan Kings. The earliest known reference to the port of Gokanna is found in the Mahavamsa stating that in the 5th century BC, when King Vijaya who having failed to convince his brother to come to Sri Lanka as his successor, got down his youngest son Panduvasdeva, who landed at Gokanna and was subsequently enthroned at Upatissagama. King Parakramabahu I used Gokanna (Trincomalee) as his eastern port, to launch a successful invasion of Burma in the 12th century.

During the colonial expansion into the Indian Ocean, Trincomalee was occupied by the Portuguese, Dutch, French and finally by the British who used the natural harbour extensively. The Portuguese built a fort to control the area and the Dutch expanded and built another to protect the harbour. The largest of these is Fort Fredrick built in 1624 by the Portuguese and exchanged hands until the British took over it in 1795. The smaller Fort Ostenburg was built on top of Ostenburg ridge at the entrance to the inner harbour of Trincomalee.

The British used Trincomalee has an anchorage for Royal Navy ships in the Indian Ocean. With switch to steam powered ships from the age of sailing, the Royal Navy established a coaling station in Trincomalee as part of their large network of support bases throughout the empire. This was the begin of a permanent Royal Navy shore establishment in Trinco.

With the beginning of the 20th century size of the Royal Naval Dockyard of Trincomalee grew as the facilities were increased during and after World War I. A large tank farm was built close to the dockyard store fuel oil of any size fleet, along with dry docks and maintenance facilities to support any ship of the Royal Navy. Due to the increase in personnel on shore and from visiting ships the Royal Naval Hospital Trincomalee was established within the yard.

In 1920, the British began deploying coastal artillery on the Ostenburg ridge, which was within the dockyard to protect the entrance to the Trincomalee harbor which had now become a major Royal Navy base in the Far East. Mounted on the ridge was a battery of three BL 6 inch Mk VII naval guns manned by the personal of Coastal Regiments of the Royal Artillery. At same time the first purpose-built military airfield was built across the harbor, near the China Bay. The Royal Air Force station of RAF China Bay was soon operational to provide air defense to Trincomalee.

With the outset of World War II, Trincomalee's defences were boosted the installation of two BL 9.2 inch Mk IX–X guns and anti-aircraft batteries manned by the Royal Artillery and the Ceylon Garrison Artillery. With the fall of Singapore, Trincomalee dockyard home port for the newly formed Eastern Fleet under the command of Admiral Sir James Somerville. Although he found good facilities, the inadequate air defenses prompted Somerville to move the fleet to a secret base in Addu Atoll.

With Chuichi Nagumo's Indian Ocean raid in April 1942 these fears were born out. Following the Easter Sunday Raid on Colombo on 9 April, the Japanese attacked the dockyard at Trincomalee. HMS Hermes, HMAS Vampire and the Flower-class corvette HMS Hollyhock were sunk. HMS Hermes was undergoing repairs in Trincomalee harbour in April 1942. As a result of the advance warning of the impending attack by the Japanese, Hermes left Trincomalee, minus the 12 Fairey Swordfish Mk Is of 814 Naval Air Squadron, disembarked. A Japanese reconnaissance plane spotted Hermes off Batticaloa, and 70 Japanese bombers attacked the defenceless Hermes forty times. The carrier sank with the loss of 307 sailors.

The RAF lost at least eight Hurricanes and the FAA one Fairey Fulmar. The Japanese lost five bombers and six fighters, one in a suicide attack on the Trincomalee fuel tanks. Seven hundred people lost their lives in the attack on Trincomalee. According to eye witness Michael Tomlinson (author of The Most Dangerous Moment and RAF Station Intelligence Officer at Ratmalana and later at China Bay in Trincomalee), one Japanese flyer deliberately crashed his plane into one of the giant fuel tanks just north of China Bay aerodrome.

The Eastern Fleet return to Trincomalee in late 1942. Operation Diplomat, a training exercise, took place in late March 1944. The objective was for the fleet to rendezvous with a group of tankers (escorted by HNLMS Tromp) and practice refuelling at sea procedures. They then rendezvoused with United States Navy Task Force 58.5, comprising USS Saratoga and three destroyers, and returned to Trincomalee on 31 March. The U.S. task force had been detached to the Indian Ocean to bolster local air defences and also to impart necessary procedures to FAA aircrew, which was done over two or three days' intensive activity at sea. Sources for the dates of return to Trincomalee and the joint US/UK training differ. In 1944, a wireless station HMS Highflyer was established in Trincomalee.

The Royal Navy presence in Ceylon came to an end in 1956, when Prime Minister S. W. R. D. Bandaranaike requested the removal of all British service personnel from the island. The dockyard was taken over by the Royal Ceylon Navy and became the home port for its newly established fleet.

During Black July and Sri Lankan civil war, many sailors from this base rioted and destroyed property around the base.

== Units ==
- 3rd Fast Gun Boats Squadron (3 FGS)
- 4th Fast Attack Flotilla (4 FAF)
- 7th Surveillance Command Squadron

== Gallery ==
SLN Dockyard Trincomalee

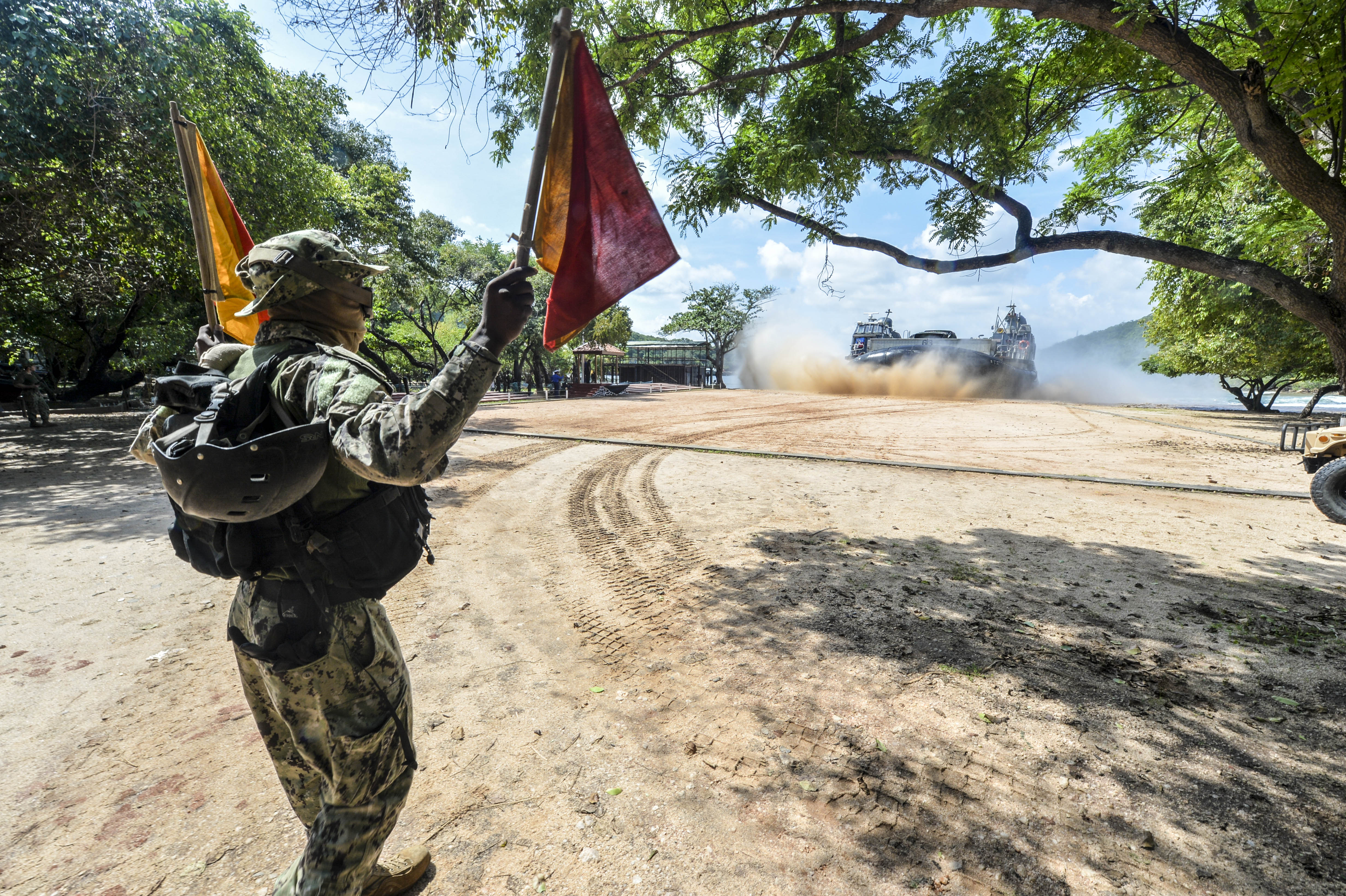
United States Marine Corps landing craft air cushion onto the Naval and Maritime Academy beach during a theatre security cooperation exchange with the Sri Lanka Navy.

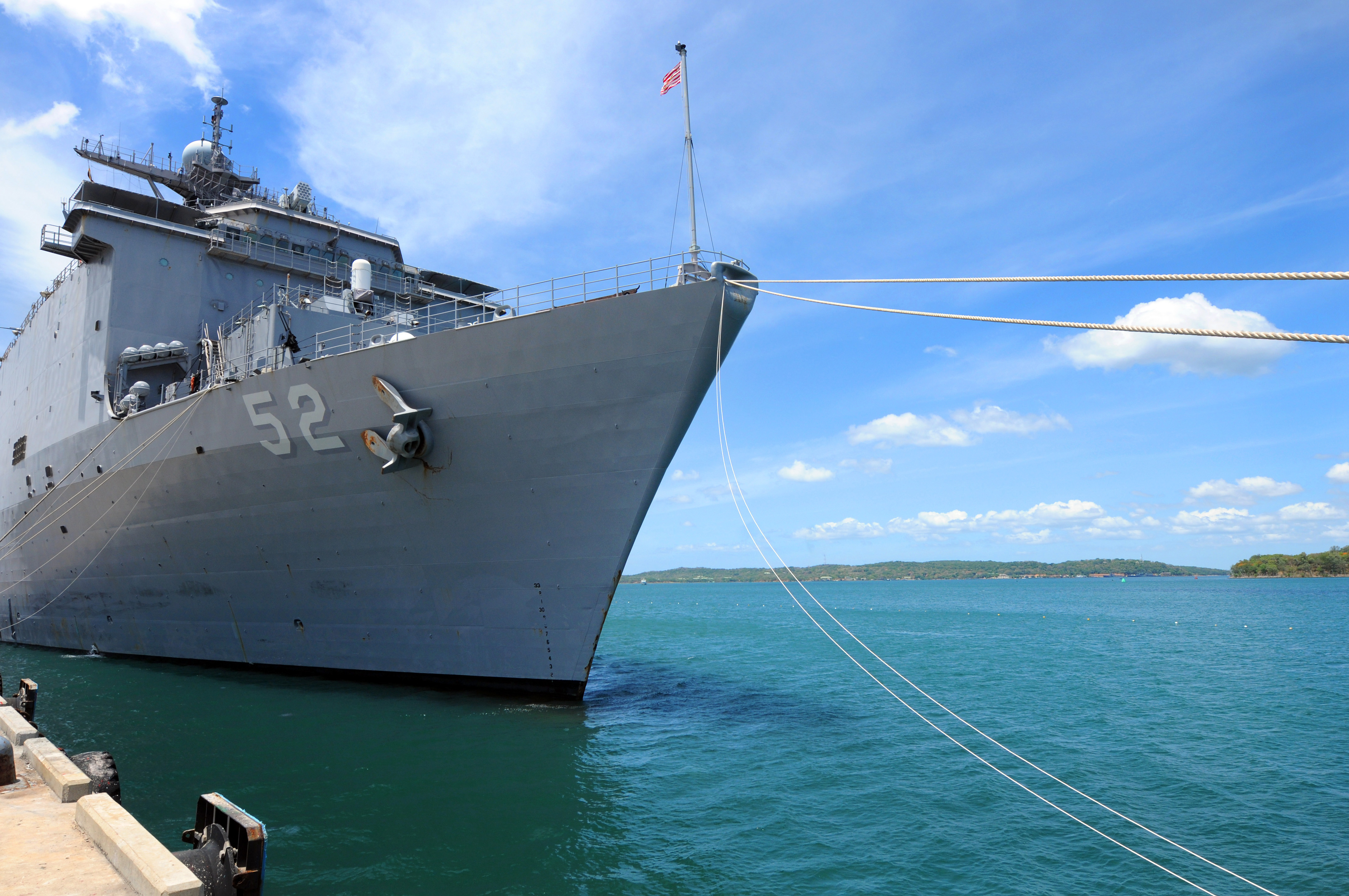
US Navy USS Pearl Harbor in SLN Dockyard, Trincomalee.

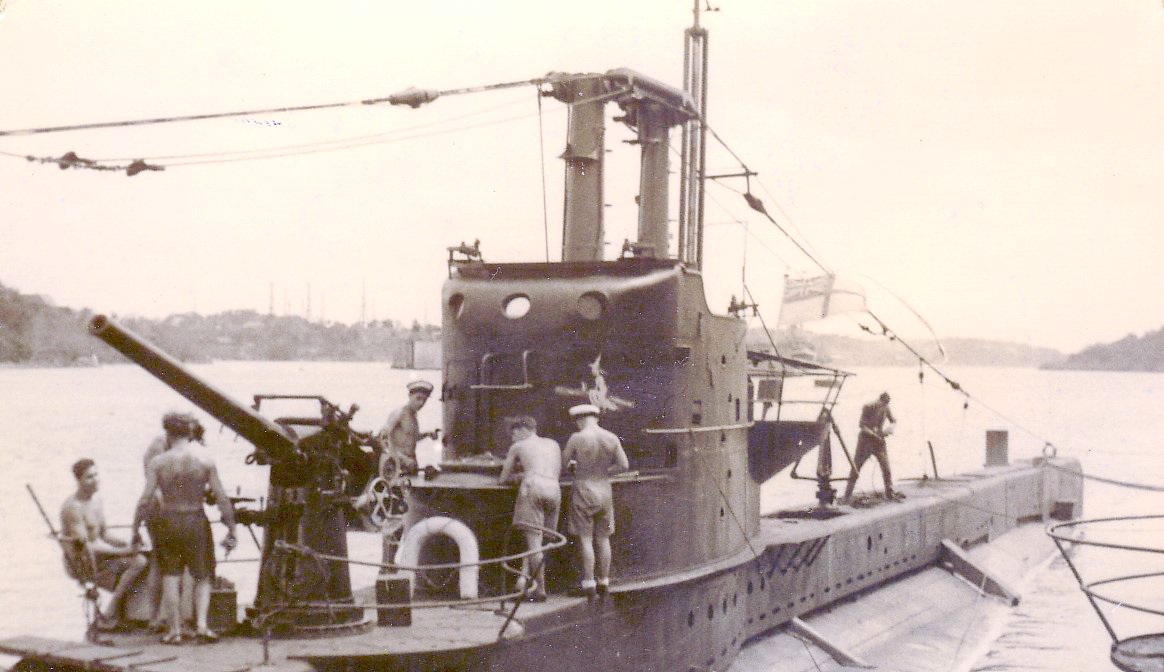
The S-class British submarine HMS Sibyl in harbour at Trincomalee, Ceylon.

== See also ==
- Trincomalee Garrison
- Naval and Maritime Academy
- Navy House, Trincomalee
