= J. R. S. Brown =

Captain J. R. S. Brown
- Military career
- Allegiance: United Kingdom; Ceylon
- Branch: Royal Navy; Royal Ceylon Navy
- Rank: Admiral
- Commands: Commander of the Royal Ceylon Navy

Captain J. R. S. Brown was the 2nd Commander of the Royal Ceylon Navy. He was appointed on 26 November 1951 until 14 June 1953. He was succeeded by P. M. B. Chavasse.

Military offices
Preceded by W. E. Banks	Commander of the Royal Ceylon Navy; 1951-1953	Succeeded by P. M. B. Chavasse
