= Philip Rodrigo =

Ceylonese businessman and philanthropist

Sir Senaipathige Theobald Philip Rodrigo, OBE (known as Sir Philip Rodrigo) was a Ceylonese businessmen and philanthropist. He was a member of the Senate of Ceylon.

In July 1947, under the Sinhala Welenda Mandalaya Ordinance which established the country's chamber of commerce, Rodrigo was named among the first members of its board of trustees. His honors include the Ceylonese title of Gate Mudaliyar, Officer (Civil Division) in the Order of the British Empire (awarded in the 1952 New Year Honours) and Knight Bachelor for his social services (1953 Coronation Honours).

Sir Philip Rodrigo was the son of Fisher Mudaliyar John Rodrigo of Mutwal and Weerahennedige Helena Rosaline Fernando. He was married on 23 Sep 1920, at St Sebastian's Church, Moratuwa, to Merennege Mary Dorothy Caroline Saldago, daughter of Simon Salgado of Moratuwa. Philip Rodrigo's eldest daughter Daisybelle Rodrigo was married to Colonel Maurice de Mel. After the death of his first wife, Philip Rodrigo married her younger sister, Merennege Mary Elizabeth Salgado, on 20 Aug 1930, at St Mary's Church, Bambalapitiya. The eldest daughter of this second marriage, Yvonne, married Joseph Shelton Fernando, a civil servant who worked in the Department of Lands and Department of Housing, before his appointment as Chairman of the State Timber Cooperation.
