= P. M. B. Chavasse =

Captain P. M. B. Chavasse CBE DSC*
- Born: Paul Morrison Bushe Chavasse; January 4, 1908; County Waterford, Ireland, United Kingdom of Great Britain and Ireland
- Died: August 23, 1994 (aged 86); Castletownshend, Skibbereen, County Cork, Ireland
- Spouse: Elizabeth Geraldine Aylmer Somerville (3 March 1905 - 12 November 1959)
- Children: 2
- Military career
- Allegiance: United Kingdom; Ceylon
- Branch: Royal Navy; Royal Ceylon Navy
- Service years: 1928-1960
- Rank: Captain
- Commands: Commander of the Royal Ceylon Navy; HMS Pembroke
- Conflicts: Second World War

Paul Morrison Bushe Chavasse (4 January 1908 - 23 August 1994) was the 3rd Commander of the Royal Ceylon Navy. He was appointed with the temporary rank of commodore on 15 June 1953 and served until 7 November 1955. He was succeeded by Royce de Mel.

== Life ==
Chavasse was the youngest son (of four brothers) of Major Henry Chavasse (1863–1943), and his second wife Judith Isabella Fleming (1867–1935). He joined the Royal Navy in 1926 and was educated at Dartmouth and Greenwich. He was commissioned an acting sub-lieutenant on 1 May 1928, and successively promoted to sub-lieutenant (1 January 1929), lieutenant (1 October 1930) and to lieutenant-commander (1 October 1938). He was awarded the Distinguished Service Cross (DSC) in 1940, mentioned in despatches for service in the Mediterranean in 1942 and awarded a second DSC in 1944 for his role in sinking the German battleship Scharnhorst. Promoted to commander (31 December 1944), he served in the Operations Division (Mining) on HMS President. In 1953, he was appointed the third commander of the Royal Ceylon Navy with the temporary rank of commodore. Serving until 1955, he was appointed a CBE in 1960 and retired as a captain later that year.

Military offices
Preceded by J. R. S. Brown	Commander of the Royal Ceylon Navy; 1953-1955	Succeeded by Royce de Mel
