= Henry Perera =

Sri Lankan navy admiral (1930–2009)

Admiral Henry Perera VSV, ndc, psc
- Born: 1930
- Died: 2009 (aged 78–79)
- Military career
- Allegiance: Sri Lanka
- Branch: Sri Lanka Navy
- Service years: 1951–1983
- Rank: Admiral
- Commands: Commander of the Sri Lankan Navy
- Other work: Sri Lankan High Commissioner to Kenya

Admiral Alfred William Henry Perera, VSV, ndc, psc, SLN (1930–2009) was the Commander of the Sri Lankan Navy from 1979 to 1983. He also served as the Sri Lankan High Commissioner to Kenya.

== Naval career ==
Educated at St. Peter's College, Colombo, Perera joined the Royal Ceylon Navy in July 1951 as a direct entry Sub Lieutenant to the executive branch and received his training at the Royal Naval College, Greenwich. Having completed his training at Greenwich in 1953, he specialized in gunnery on board HMS Excellent in 1954. In 1962, promoted to lieutenant commander, he served as a member of the United Nations Security Force in West New Guinea. He attended Defence Services Staff College, Wellington in 1964. In 1970, he was promoted to the rank of commander. During the 1971 JVP Insurrection, the RCyN deployed its officers and sailors for shore duty conducting counter insurgency operations in several districts. Commander Perera was appointed military coordinating officer of the Polonnaruwa District. In 1973, he was promoted to the rank of captain and attended National Defence College, New Delhi in 1976. During his career he held several commands at sea and on shore including Naval Officer in Charge, Trincomalee and Chief of Naval Staff. A passionate rugby player, served as the Chairman of the Naval Sports Board as well as the Chairman Defence Services Sports Board.

Promoted to the rank of rear admiral, he was appointed Commander of the Sri Lankan Navy on 1 June 1979 succeeding Basil Gunasekara. With the onset of the Sri Lankan Civil War, he continued the modernization and expansion of the navy. He initiated the development of the locally built Jayasagara-class offshore patrol vessels for the navy. He retired from the navy on 31 May 1983 and was promoted to the rank of vice admiral. He was succeeded by Asoka de Silva.

During his long career in the navy, he received the Vishista Seva Vibhushanaya, Republic of Sri Lanka Armed Services Medal, Sri Lanka Armed Services Long Service Medal, Ceylon Armed Services Long Service Medal, President's Inauguration Medal and the Sri Lanka Navy 25th Anniversary Medal. In 2007 he was promoted to the rank of admiral along with nine other former service commanders.

== Later life ==
Following his retirement, he was appointed as the Commissioner General of Essential Services and thereafter was appointed Sri Lanka High Commissioner to Kenya in which capacity he served for four years. He lived at his home in Pagoda Road, Nugegoda, until he died after a brief illness on 14 November 2009. His funeral was held at the Borella General Cemetery with full military honours.

== Family ==
He was married to Daphne, and they had a daughter Sharma and a son Arjuna.

Military offices
Preceded by Basil Gunasekara	Commander of the Sri Lankan Navy; 1979–1983	Succeeded by Asoka de Silva
