= Bertram Thesiger =

Royal Navy Admiral (1875–1966)

Admiral Sir Bertram Thesiger KBE CB CMG DL
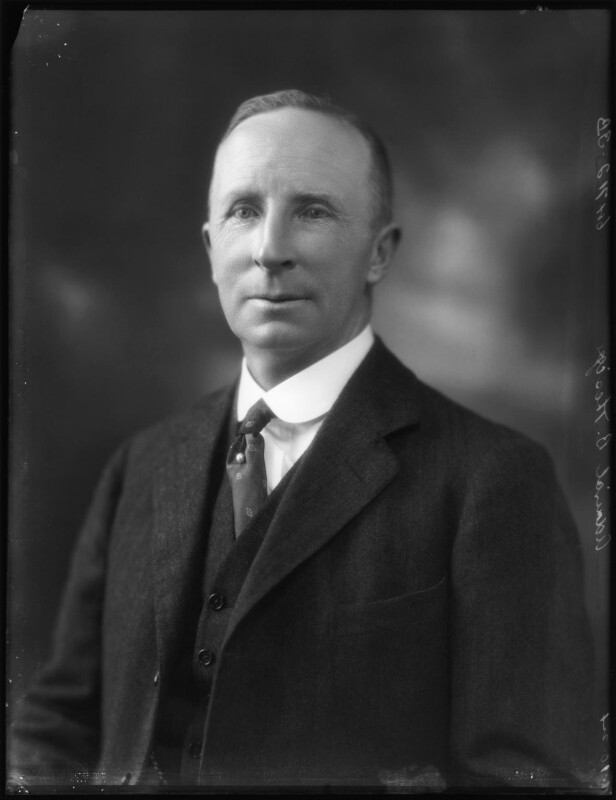
- Thesiger in 1924
- Born: 14 January 1875
- Died: 12 May 1966 (aged 91)
- Military career
- Allegiance: United Kingdom
- Branch: Royal Navy
- Service years: 1887–1944
- Rank: Admiral
- Commands: HMS Inconstant; East Indies Station
- Conflicts: World War I World War II
- Awards: Knight Commander of the Order of the British Empire; Companion of the Order of the Bath; Companion of the Order of St Michael and St George

Admiral Sir Bertram Sackville Thesiger KBE CB CMG DL (14 January 1875 – 12 May 1966) was a Royal Navy officer who went on to be Commander-in-Chief, East Indies Station.

== Early life ==
He was the son of Hon. Sir Edward Pierson Thesiger, Clerk to the House of Lords, and Georgina Mary Stopford.

== Naval career ==
Thesiger joined the Royal Navy in 1887. Promoted to commander he was appointed a Companion of the Order of St Michael and St George (CMG) in the 1911 Coronation Honours.

He served in World War I as commanding officer of HMS Inconstant at the Battle of Jutland and was invested as a Companion of the Order of the Bath (CB) in 1916. He became Admiral Superintendent Portsmouth Dockyard in 1925 and Commander-in-Chief, East Indies Station in 1927; he retired with the rank of admiral in 1932.

He was recalled during the Second World War to be Convoy Commodore, with the rank of commodore, 2nd class Royal Naval Reserve from 1940 to 1942 and then to be Flag Officer in charge at Falmouth from 1942 to 1944. He was appointed a Knight Commander of the British Empire (KBE) in the 1942 New Year Honours and also a Commander of the American Legion of Merit.

He became deputy lieutenant of Hampshire and lived at "Clerks" in Bramshott in Hampshire.

== Family ==
In 1921 he married Violet Brodrick Cloete (née Henley) in Malta.

Military offices
Preceded by Walter Ellerton	Commander-in-Chief, East Indies Station; 1927–1929	Succeeded by Sir Eric Fullerton
