= H. C. A. C. Tissera =

Commander of the Sri Lankan Navy

Admiral H. C. A. Cecil Tissera VSV, USP, ndc
- Born: March 11, 1947 (age 79)
- Military career
- Allegiance: Sri Lanka
- Branch: Sri Lanka Navy
- Rank: Admiral
- Service number: NRX 0026
- Commands: Commander of the Sri Lankan Navy

Admiral H. C. A. Cecil Tissera, VSV, USP, ndc SLN was the 14th Commander of the Sri Lankan Navy.

Born in Wattala, Tissera joined the Royal Ceylon Navy as an officer cadet in 1966, he received his training at Britannia Royal Naval College in Dartmouth and was commissioned as an acting sub lieutenant. He was the first Sri Lankan naval officer to attended the National Defence College, Islamabad.

He became the youngest officer to be promoted to the rank of Vice Admiral, when he was appointed Commander of the Sri Lankan Navy on 28 January 1997. In December 1997, a suicide truck bomb targeting Tissera, blew up prematurely. He served until his retirement on 31 December 2000, when he was promoted to the rank of admiral and was succeeded by Daya Sandagiri.

Military offices
Preceded by D. A. M. R. Samarasekara	Commander of the Sri Lankan Navy; 1997-2000	Succeeded by Daya Sandagiri
