= Maurice de Mel =

Colonel Maurice de Mel
- Military career
- Allegiance: British Ceylon; Ceylon
- Branch: Ceylon Defence Force, Ceylon Army
- Service years: 1940-1949, 1949-1962
- Rank: Colonel
- Service number: O/50006
- Units: Ceylon Garrison Artillery, Ceylon Artillery
- Commands: Ceylon Volunteer Force, 1st Light Anti-Aircraft Regiment
- Conflicts: World War II

Colonel Maurice Ann Gerard de Mel is a Ceylonese army officer. He served as Chief of Staff of the Ceylon Army and Commandant of the Ceylon Volunteer Force. He was one of the principals accused of the 1962 Ceylonese coup d'état attempt.

== Early life ==
Born to a wealthy Roman Catholic family, he was educated at Saint Joseph's College, Colombo, where he excelled in athletics and cricket. He had five brothers, which included Royce de Mel, later a Rear Admiral and Captain of the Royal Ceylon Navy and Reverend Joseph de Mel, Vicar General, Archdiocese of Colombo and Rector of the National Seminary, Ampitiya.

== Military career ==
Following the out break of World War II, de Mel joined the Ceylon Defense Force and was commissioned as a second lieutenant in the Ceylon Garrison Artillery. With the formation of the Ceylon Army in 1949, he was transferred to it with a regular commission as a Major in the 1st Heavy Anti-Aircraft Regiment of the Ceylon Artillery and in 1953 he was transferred to the 3rd Field Artillery Regiment when it was formed as the third artillery regiment and was promoted to lieutenant colonel. He attended the Staff College, Camberley. De Mel was appointed the commanding officer, 1st Light Anti-Aircraft Regiment as the 1st regiment was renamed in 1956. He was promoted to colonel, and appointed Chief of Staff of the army on 17 February 1956 and served till 13 November 1959. He was thereafter appointed Commandant of the Ceylon Volunteer Force. He had received the Defence Medal, the War Medal 1939–1945, and the Ceylon Armed Services Inauguration Medal.

== Attempted military coup ==
On 29 January 1962, Colonel de Mel was arrested for plotting to topple the government of Prime Minister Sirimavo Bandaranaike and remanded, pending trial, in a special section of the Welikada Prison called the Magazine Section. In 1964, the trial at bar, found Royce De Mel along with eleven of the 24 accused guilty and sentenced then to ten years in jail and confiscation of property. However, on appeal to the Privy Council, it ruled in December 1965 holding Special Act of 1962 ultra vires of the Ceylon constitution and said that the Act had denied fair trial. According to the Privy Council the law had been specially enacted to convict the men, under trial they did not have the protections that they would have had under general criminal law. It acquitted all eleven.

== Family ==
De Mel married Daisybelle Rodrigo, eldest daughter of Sir Philip Rodrigo and Lady Rodrigo. They had three children Srimali, Manilal and Ranjith.
