= D. A. M. R. Samarasekara =

Sri Lankan admiral

Admiral D. A. M. R. Samarasekara VSV, USP
- Born: 8 June 1948 (age 78)
- Burial place: Bauddhaloka Cemetery
- Military career
- Allegiance: Sri Lanka
- Branch: Sri Lanka Navy
- Service years: 1971-1997
- Rank: Admiral
- Service number: NRX 0024
- Commands: Commander of the Sri Lankan Navy

Admiral D. A. Mohan R. Samarasekara, VSV, USP, ndc, psc, SLN was the 13th Commander of the Sri Lankan Navy.

Having joined the Royal Ceylon Navy as an officer cadet in 1971, he received his training at US Naval War College in Newport, Rhode Island and was commissioned as an acting sub lieutenant. He later attended the Defence Services Staff College, Wellington and the National Defence College, New Delhi.

Rear Admiral Samarasekara was serving as Chief of Staff of the navy when commander of the navy, Vice Admiral Clancy Fernando was assassinated by a LTTE suicide bomber on 16 November 1992. That day, Samarasekara took over as acting commander of the navy and was confirmed in the post and promoted to Vice Admiral. His tenure saw the continuation of aggressive naval operations against LTTE activity at sea, denying them free movement in the coastal waters effecting their gun running operations. As such when the LTTE and the newly elected government started peace negotiations in 1994, the LTTE withdrew from the peace talks a few months later by attacking larger fleet elements of the navy in Trincomalee. He retired on 27 November 1997 and was promoted to the rank of Admiral. He was succeeded by H. C. A. C. Tissera. Following his retirement he served as the Chairman, Sri Lanka Ports Authority.He died on December 23, 2022, from lung failure, aged 74, and he is buried at Bauddhaloka Cemetery.

Military offices
| Preceded by Clancy Fernando | Commander of the Sri Lankan Navy; 1992-1997 | Succeeded by H. C. A. C. Thisera |
