= Asoka de Silva (admiral) =

Sri Lankan Ambassador to Cuba

- Born: A. H. Asoka de Silva; 1931
- Died: 22 December 2006 (aged 74–75)
- Military career
- Allegiance: Sri Lanka
- Branch: Sri Lanka Navy
- Service years: 1950–1986
- Rank: Vice Admiral
- Service number: NRX 0001
- Commands: Commander of the Sri Lanka Navy
- Conflicts: 1971 Insurrection; Sri Lankan Civil War
- Other work: Sri Lanka's Ambassador to Cuba

Vice Admiral A. H. Asoka de Silva, VSV (1931 – 22 December 2006) was the Commander of the Sri Lanka Navy from 1983 to 1986. He was the first Sri Lankan Ambassador to Cuba.

== Early life and education ==
Born to a renowned surgeon and one time superintendent of the De Soysa Maternity Hospital in Colombo, Dr. A.H.T de Silva and Beatrice Rodrigo, daughter of Mudaliyar Thomas Rodrigo, Asoka was the third child of a family of eight members. He was educated at the Royal College, Colombo, where he was the senior sergeant commanding the Royal College cadet contingent. He won college colours for rugby.

== Naval career ==
De Silva joined the then Royal Ceylon Navy as an officer cadet in the first cadet intake, soon after completing school on 1 September 1950. After completing his assault-training course he was sent to Britannia Royal Naval College in Dartmouth for officer training. There he became a midshipman on 1 September 1951 and subsequently promoted as an acting sub lieutenant. On 1 January 1953, he was commissioned to the rank of sub lieutenant after completing basic training, after which he was elevated to the rank of lieutenant on 16 March 1955, and lieutenant commander on 16 March 1963. During this time he received specialized training in communication at HMS Mercury, thereafter attended the Royal Naval College, Greenwich. He attended Defence Services Staff College, Wellington in 1967 and later attended National Defence College, New Delhi in 1977.

From 1969 to 1970, he was the defence attaché, at the Sri Lankan High Commission in London before being promoted to commander on 1 November 1970, after which he was the commanding officer HMCyS Gajabahu the flagship of the fleet and the co-ordinating officer of the Polonnaruwa District during the 1971 Insurrection. He was the Naval Officer-in Charge of Trincomalee when he was promoted to the rank of captain on 1 June 1973, after which he was the Master of MV Lanka Kanthi of the Ceylon Shipping Corporation in 1975. He went on to serve as the Naval Officer-In-Charge of Trincomalee, Co-ordinating officer TAFII (East), Deputy Master Attendant (Trincomalee) and Director Naval Operations when, on 4 February 1978, he was made commodore. On 1 July 1979 he assumed duties as the chief of staff at Naval Headquarters, SLNS Ranagala.

On 1 June 1983, he was appointed as commander of the navy with the promotion to the rank of rear admiral. With the escalation of the Sri Lankan Civil War, Admiral de Silva was concurrently appointed Coordinating Officer of the District of Trincomalee and later commander-in-chief of the Joint Services Special Operations (JOSSOP), with its Command Headquarters established in Vavuniya with responsible for the districts of Mannar, Vavuniya, Mullativu and Trincomalee. During his tenure the navy acquired three vessels, converting them as Surveillance Command Ships, allowing these ships to serve as Mother Ships for small patrol crafts. The Naval Patrolman Branch was created as a form of naval infantry and the navy began the recruitment of women. De Silva was also the chairman of the Sri Lanka Navy Sports Board and chairman of the Defence Services Sports Board. He was promoted to the rank of vice admiral on 1 August 1986 becoming the first naval officer to hold the rank. On reaching the age of 55, he retired from the navy on 1 November 1986.

== Honors ==
During his long career in the navy, he received the Vishista Seva Vibhushanaya, Republic of Sri Lanka Armed Services Medal, the Sri Lanka Navy 25th Anniversary Medal, the Ceylon Armed Services Long Service Medal and clasp, the Sri Lanka Armed Services Long Service Medal, the President's Inauguration Medal, and the Ceylon Armed Services Inauguration Medal.

== Later life ==
Following his retirement from the navy, he was appointed the first Sri Lanka's Ambassador to Cuba. Following his tenor as Ambassador, he served as a consultant to the Jamaica Maritime Training Institute and returned to Sri Lanka in 1994. He took part in the formation of the Retired Naval Officers Club.

== Family ==
Asoka de Silva was married to Sriya de Silva, they had one son Sajith, two daughters Dilini and Rapti.

== See also ==
- Sri Lanka Navy
- Sri Lankan Non Career Diplomats

Military offices
Preceded by A.W. Henry Perera	Commander of the Sri Lanka Navy; 1983–1986	Succeeded by H. A. Silva
