= Navy House, Trincomalee =

Official residence of the Sri Lanka Navy

Coordinates: 8.5613°N 81.233°E

Navy House
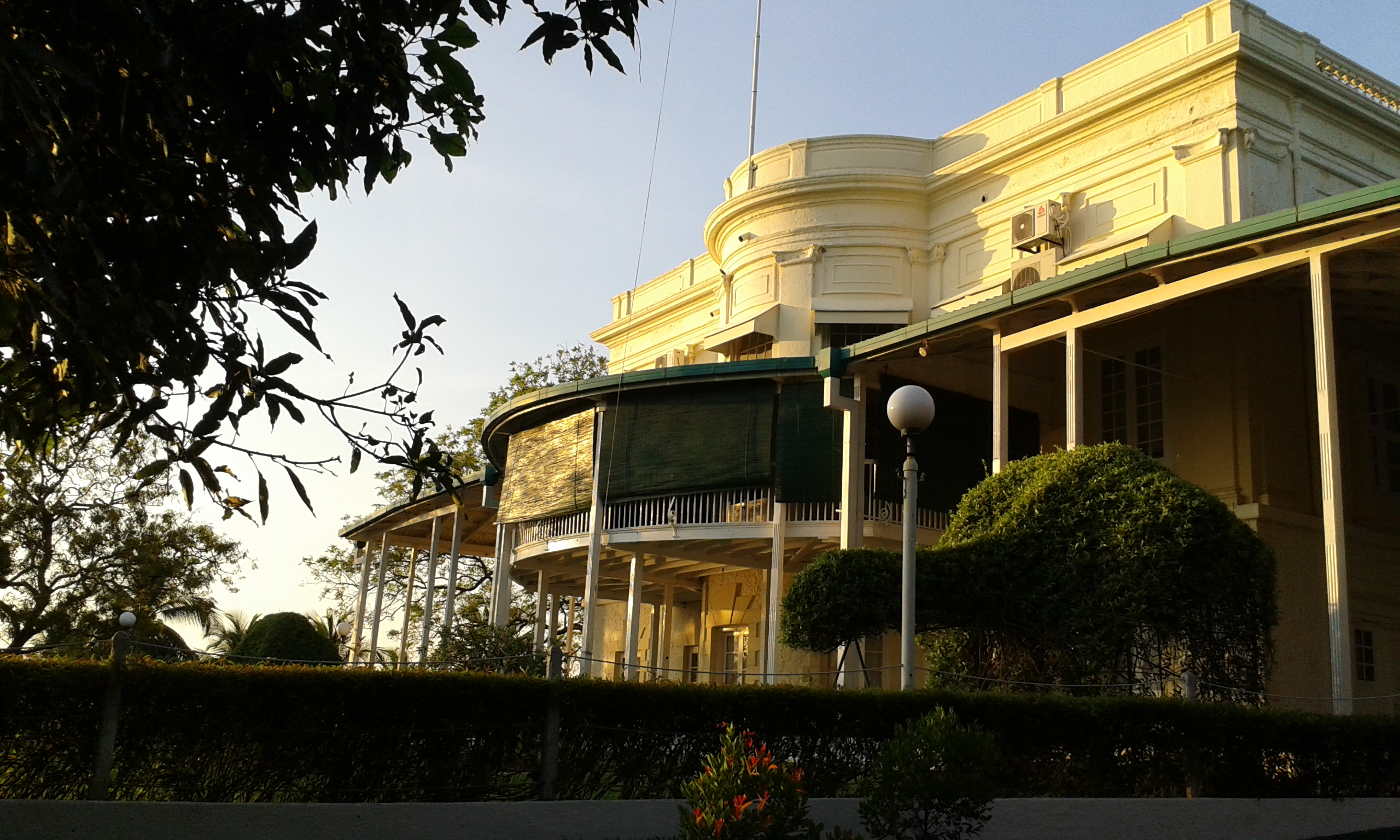
- Interactive map of the Navy House area

General information
- Location: Trincomalee, Sri Lanka
- Owner: Sri Lanka Navy

Navy House was the official residence of the Commander of the Sri Lanka Navy, located in SLN Dockyard, Trincomalee, Sri Lanka. It was formerly the official residence of the naval officer commanding, HM Dockyard, Trincomalee and later the Commander-in-Chief, East Indies Station of the Royal Navy.

== History ==
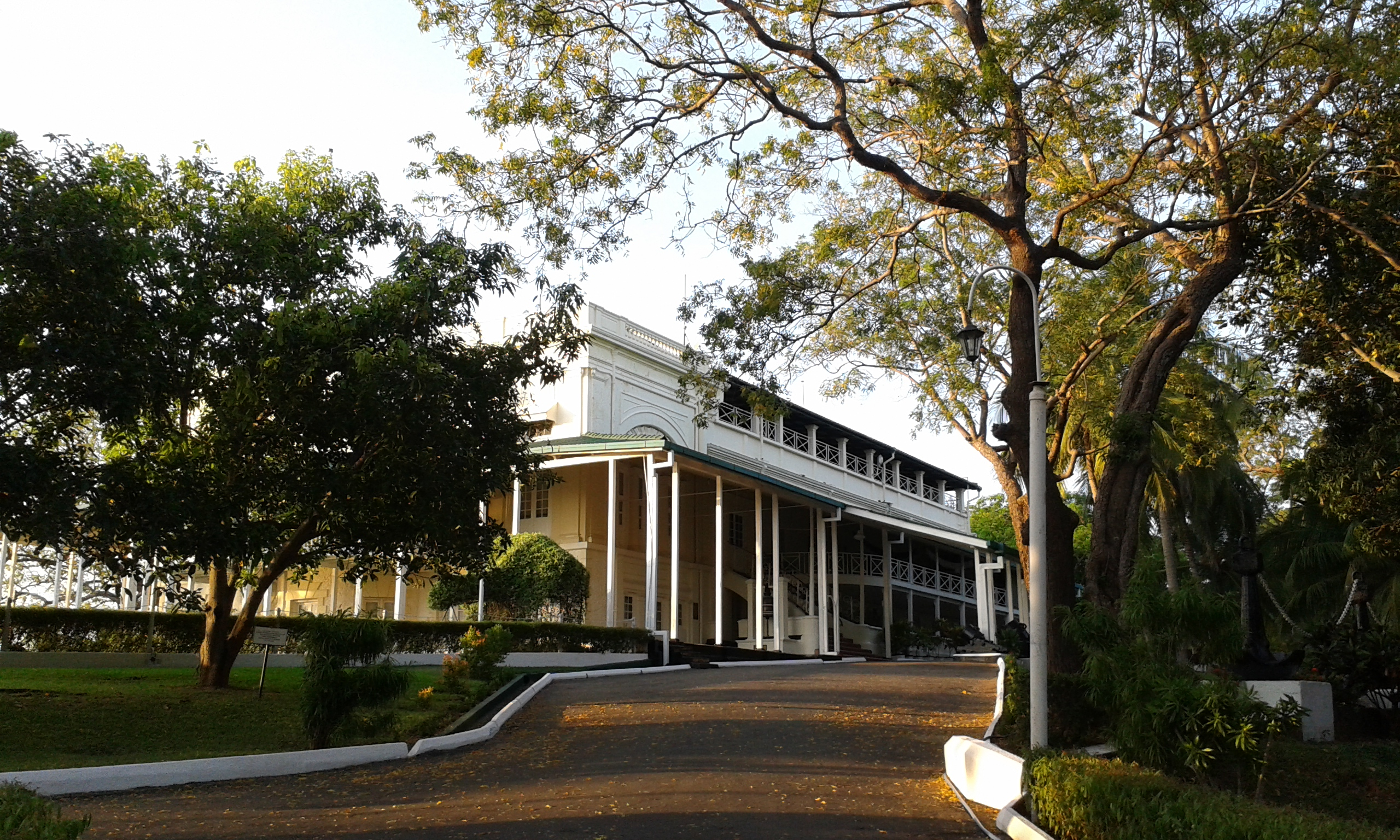
Navy House

The building was acquired for the Commander in Chief of the East Indies Station at a cost of £1,750 in 1810. A large bell, which was rung to summon sailors for duty, was donated by Rear-Admiral Charles Austen in 1850. The last British occupant of the building was Vice-Admiral Hilary Biggs. Security was provided by the Ceylon Rifle Regiment. On 15 October 1957, the Trincomalee Naval Dockyard was officially handed over by the Royal Navy to the Sri Lankan government and since then the property been a possession of the Sri Lanka Navy.

== See also ==
- Navy House, Colombo
