= Daya Sandagiri =

Sri Lankan Navy commander

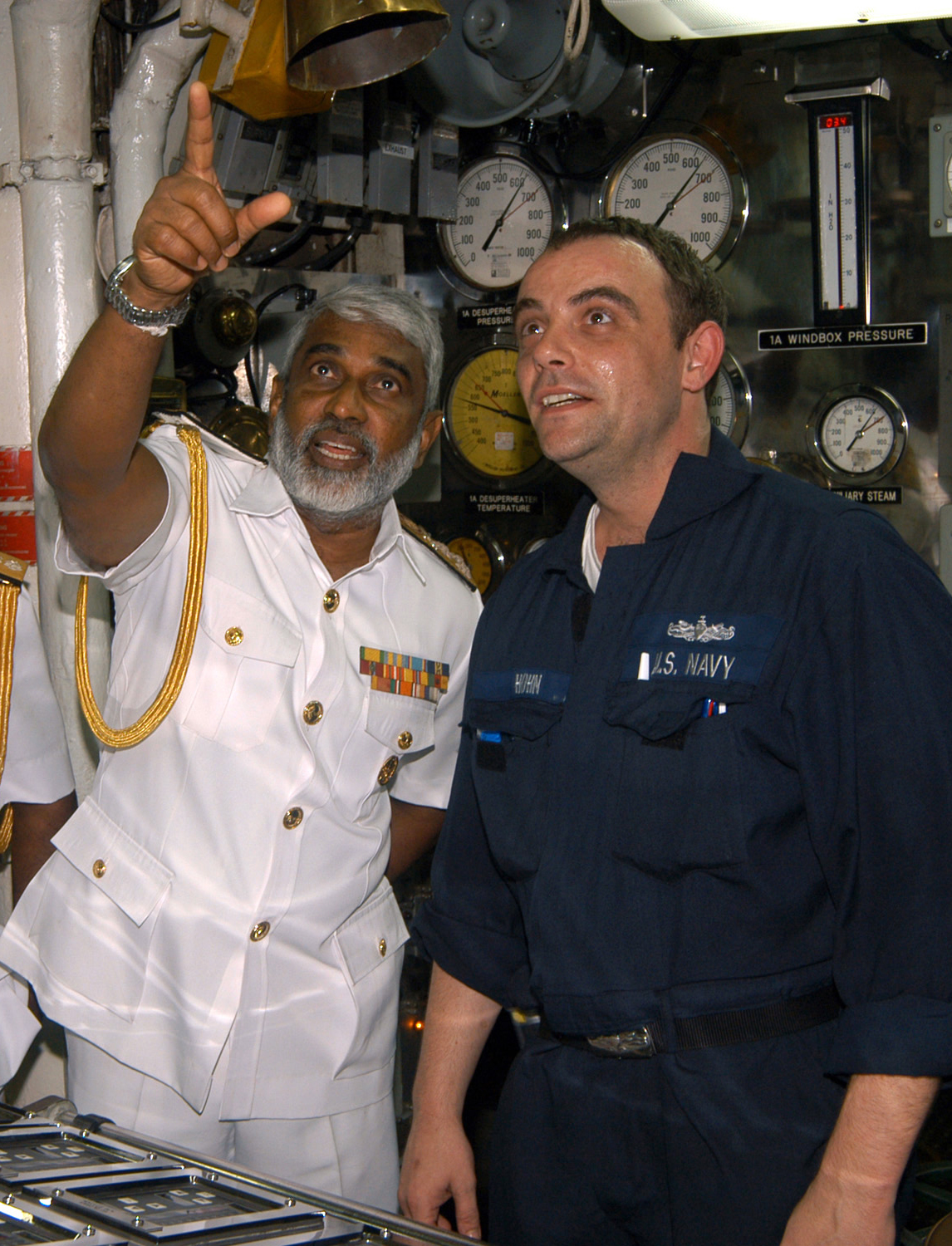
- Sandagiri (left) on board USS Blue Ridge
- Born: 1 September 1946 (age 80)
- Education: Kegalu Vidyalaya, St. Mary's Maha Vidyalaya, Veyangoda
- Spouse: Pearl Sandagiri
- Children: 2
- Military career
- Allegiance: Sri Lanka
- Branch: Sri Lanka Navy
- Service years: 1973–2006
- Rank: Admiral
- Service number: NRX 0028
- Commands: Commander of the Sri Lankan Navy; Chief of Defence Staff
- Conflicts: Sri Lankan Civil War
- Awards: Vishista Seva Vibhushanaya; Uttama Seva Padakkama; Purna Bhumi Padakkama

Daya W. K. Sandagiri was the 14th Commander of the Sri Lanka Navy. Admiral Sandagiri was born in Veyangoda and had his education at St. Mary's Maha Vidyalaya, Veyangoda and Kegalu Vidyalaya, Kegalle. He enlisted in the then Royal Ceylon Navy on 14 November 1966 and was in the first batch of naval cadets to join the Naval and Maritime Academy at Trincomalee on 1 July 1969. He was commissioned into the Executive Branch of the navy as a sub-lieutenant on 1 July 1972.

He was promoted to Commander of the Navy and served for four years and eight months in the position. Upon his retirement he was appointed Chief of the Defence Staff with the rank of admiral on 1 September 2005. He retired from that position on 12 June 2005. He became the fourth chancellor of General Sir John Kotelawala Defence University on 9 November 2015.

Military offices
Preceded by L. P. Balagalle	Chief of the Defence Staff; 2005–2006	Succeeded by Donald Perera
Preceded by H. C. A. C. Thisera	Commander of the Sri Lanka Navy; 2000–2005	Succeeded by Wasantha Karannagoda
