= Royce de Mel =

Captain convicted of coup attempt

Rear Admiral Royce de Mel OBE
- Born: 10 June 1917; Colombo, British Ceylon
- Relatives: Maurice de Mel
- Military career
- Allegiance: British Ceylon; Ceylon
- Branch: Ceylon Royal Naval Volunteer Reserve; Royal Ceylon Navy
- Service years: 1940–1950, 1950–1961
- Rank: Rear admiral
- Commands: Captain of the Royal Ceylon Navy; Commanding Officer, Ceylon Royal Naval Volunteer Reserve
- Conflicts: World War II
- Awards: Defense Medal; Burma Star

Rear Admiral Gerard Royce Maxwell De Mel, OBE (born 10 June 1917, date of death unknown) was a Ceylonese admiral. He was the Captain of the Royal Ceylon Navy from 1955 to 1961, the first Ceylonese to hold the post. He was accused and convicted in the 1962 Ceylonese coup d'état attempt.

== Early life ==
Born in Colombo, on 10 June 1917, to a wealthy Roman Catholic family, he was educated at Saint Joseph's College, Colombo, where he excelled in athletics. He was the eldest of six brothers, which included Maurice de Mel, later a colonel and Chief of Staff of the Ceylon Army and another was the Very Reverend Joe de Mel, Vicar General, Archdiocese of Colombo and Rector of the National Seminary Ampitiya.

== Naval career ==
=== Ceylon Naval Volunteer Force ===
When De Mel completed his schooling, World War II had started, he joined the Ceylon Naval Volunteer Force (CNVF) and was commissioned as a probationary sub lieutenant after undergoing training at Trincomolee on 7 February 1940. Following the start of the war in the far east, the CNVF which had been renamed as the Ceylon Royal Naval Volunteer Reserve (CRNVR) functioned under the command of Royal Navy. He was promoted to lieutenant in 1941 and to lieutenant commander in 1945. Having served in all CRNVR ships and had seen action off the coast of Burma. With the end of the war and de-mobilization, Commander De Mel remained with the CRNVR and took over as its commanding officer from Captain W. G. Beauchamp.

=== Royal Ceylon Navy ===
In 1950, the Royal Ceylon Navy was established, Commander De Mel transferred to a regular commission as its most senior officer and was sent to the United Kingdom for training. On his return he served as Chief of Staff of the Navy. In 1954, he was appointed extra Aide-de-camp to Queen Elizabeth II on her royal tour of Ceylon. He was confirmed in the rank of Captain and promoted to Commodore in 1955.

=== Captain of the Navy ===
Commodore De Mel took over as the first Ceylonese Captain of the navy on 15 August 1955 succeeding Commodore P. M. B. Chavasse. De Mel was promoted to rear admiral in 1959, becoming the first serving officer to hold the rank. During his tenor the Royal Ceylon Navy took over Royal Navy facilities in Ceylon including the Royal Naval Dockyard, Trincomalee. The navy expanded its blue water capability and in 1960, a naval fleet undertook a deployment to the far east. However, on its return the fleet was search for contraband. The board of investigation in to the affair recommended the dismissal of several navy officers and Admiral De Mel was relieved of command on 15 November 1960 and sent on compulsory retirement on 15 August 1961. He was succeeded by Captain Rajan Kadiragamar.

De Mel was appointed an Officer of the Order of the British Empire (Military Division) (OBE) in the 1948 Birthday Honours and his other medals include the 1939–1945 Star, the Burma Star, the Defense Medal and the War Medal 1939–1945 for war service with the Ceylon Royal Naval Volunteer Reserve. For service in the Royal Ceylon Navy he received the service medals Ceylon Armed Services Inauguration Medal and the Queen Elizabeth II Coronation Medal.

== Attempted military coup ==
In 1962, De Mel was accused in the 1962 Ceylonese coup d'état attempt and an arrest warrant was issued for him along with his brother was Colonel Maurice de Mel, the Commandant of the Volunteer Force (second-in-command of the Army). Avoiding arrest, De Mel was suspected of using his connections in the Indian Navy to smuggle him out of Ceylon, but surrendered to the court through his lawyer G. G. Ponnambalam when the trail of the accused started in June 1962. In 1964, the trail at bar, found Royce De Mel along with 11 of the 24 accused guilty and sentenced then to ten years in jail and confiscation of property. However, on appeal to the Judicial Committee of the Privy Council, it ruled in December 1965 holding Special Act of 1962 to be ultra vires of the 1947 Constitution of Ceylon and said that the Act had denied the right to a fair trial. According to the Privy Council, the law had been specially enacted to convict the men, under trial they did not have the protections that they would have had under general criminal law. It acquitted all the eleven.

De Mel died prior to 2002.

Military offices
Preceded by P. M. B. Chavasse	Commander of the Royal Ceylon Navy; 1955–1960	Succeeded by Rajan Kadiragamar
