= Walter Ellerton =

Royal Navy officer (1870–1948)

Admiral Walter Ellerton CB
- Born: 5 August 1870
- Died: 27 November 1948 (aged 78)
- Military career
- Allegiance: United Kingdom
- Branch: Royal Navy
- Rank: Admiral
- Commands: HMS Cornwall; East Indies Station
- Conflicts: World War I
- Awards: Companion of the Order of the Bath

Admiral Walter Maurice Ellerton CB (5 August 1870 – 27 November 1948) was a Royal Navy officer who went on to be commander-in-chief of the East Indies Station.

== Naval career ==
Educated at Sherborne, Ellerton joined the Royal Navy in 1884. He served in World War I and, as captain of HMS Cornwall, took part in the Battle of the Falkland Islands in December 1914. He was commended for his service in Gallipoli in 1915.

Promoted to rear admiral in 1921, he was appointed director of training and staff duties at the Admiralty that year, senior naval officer in Gibraltar in 1923 and commander-in-chief of the East Indies Station in 1925. He was promoted to vice admiral on 4 October 1926, and retired with the rank of admiral in 1929.

== Family ==
In 1909 Ellerton married Gwendolen Mary Kennard.

Military offices
Preceded by Sir Herbert Richmond	Commander-in-Chief, East Indies Station; 1925–1927	Succeeded by Sir Bertram Thesiger
