= Action of 8 May 1941 =

WWII naval battle in 1941

- Part of the Second World War
- Location map of the Seychelles
Date	8 May 1941
Location	off the Seychelles, Indian Ocean 3.5°N 57.8°E
Result	British victory

Belligerents
United Kingdom	Germany

Commanders and leaders
P. C. W. Manwaring	Ernst-Felix Krüder †

Units involved
HMS Cornwall	Pinguin

Strength
1 heavy cruiser	1 auxiliary cruiser

Casualties and losses
1 killed; c. 200 imprisoned sailors killed; 22 liberated; Cornwall slight damage	323 killed; 60 captured; Pinguin sunk

The action of 8 May 1941 was a single ship action fought during the Second World War by the British heavy cruiser HMS Cornwall and the Kriegsmarine (German Navy) auxiliary cruiser Pinguin/Schiff 33 (Raider F to the Admiralty). The engagement took place in the Indian Ocean off the Seychelles archipelago, north of Madagascar. Pinguin caused slight damage to Cornwall, before its fire on Pinguin caused an explosion and sank it.

A British sailor was killed on Cornwall and about c. 200 of the 222 British and Indian Merchant Navy prisoners on Pinguin, captured from over thirty merchant vessels, were also killed. Of the crew of 401 men, 323 were killed and 60 were rescued along with 22 of the Merchant Navy prisoners. Cornwall returned to Durban for repairs until 10 June.

== Background ==
=== HMS Cornwall ===
HMS Cornwall (Captain Percival Manwaring) was a County-class heavy cruiser of the Kent subclass, built in the mid-1920s. It had a displacement of 10,000 long tons (10,000 t), carried eight 8 in (200 mm) guns in four twin turrets, four 4 in (100 mm) anti-aircraft guns in two twin turrets, two four-barrelled 2-pounder pom-pom guns and two .50 in (13 mm) machine guns. Cornwall had an aircraft catapult, three Walrus amphibious aircraft and had a maximum speed of 31.5 kn (58.3 km/h; 36.2 mph).

=== Pinguin ===
The auxiliary cruiser Pinguin/Schiff 33 (Kapitän Ernst-Felix Krüder), was originally the freighter Kandelfels, which had been launched in 1937 of 7,766 gross register tons, capable of 16 kn (30 km/h; 18 mph). After conversion to an auxiliary cruiser it became Schiff 33 to the Kriegsmarine (Raider F to the British). Pinguin was armed with six 150 mm (5.9 in) guns, a 75 mm (3.0 in) gun, two 37 mm (1.46 in) anti-aircraft guns, four 20 mm (0.79 in) autocannon, two torpedo tubes, 300 mines and an Arado Ar 196 A-1 floatplane. By 15 January, Pinguin had captured 14 Norwegian merchant vessels by commerce raiding. It had captured three 12,000 long tons (12,000 t) factory ships and eleven whalers belonging to the same whaling company. The prizes were sent to Occupied France where one was renamed Adjutant and was used as minelayer for the German raiders in the South Atlantic and the Indian Ocean. In April, Pinguin sank three British merchant ships in the Indian Ocean, close to the Equator.

== Prelude ==
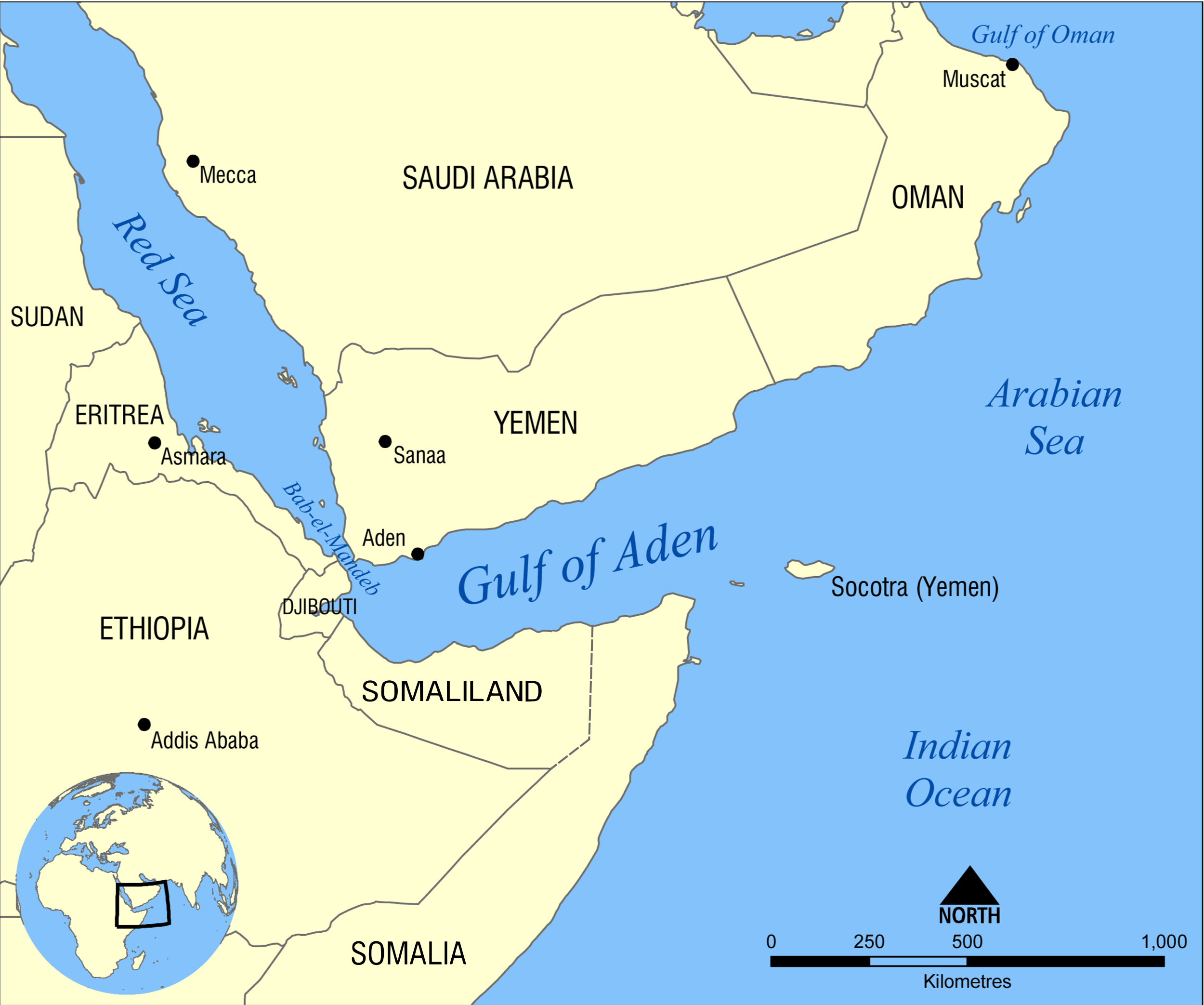
Cape Guardafui

After sinking Clan Buchanan on 28 April, Pinguin sailed north-west and on 4 May, fuelled and provisioned Adjutant, which was sent away to wait at a rendezvous near the Saya de Malha Bank. Just after 5:00 a.m. on 7 May, Pinguin intercepted and sank the 3,663 long tons (3,722 t) tanker British Emperor, which was on passage from Durban to Abadan, about 375 nmi (694 km; 432 mi) east-south-east of Cape Guardafui. Emperor had sent a distress message and Cornwall, en route to refuel at the Seychelles Islands, intercepted the message when about 520 nmi (960 km; 600 mi) south of the attack. Cornwall altered course to north-north-west and increased speed to 20 kn (37 km/h; 23 mph). A plan was devised to catch the raider, using the Walrus spotter aircraft carried by Cornwall to close the raider's furthest on line and then search to cover the largest potential variations of the raiding ship's speed and course.

Cornwall increased speed to 25.5 kn (47.2 km/h; 29.3 mph), heading north between the Seychelles and the Chagos Archipelago. Vice-Admiral Ralph Leatham, the Commander-in-Chief East Indies Station, ordered other ships to participate in the search. HMNZS Leander was sailing westwards at 25 kn (46 km/h; 29 mph) from Nine Degree Channel towards Socotra, while HMS Liverpool, which was north of Cape Guardafui, sailed for Eight Degree Channel, making for Colombo. HMS Glasgow, steaming from the Gulf of Aden, passed Cape Guardafui that morning at 23 kn (43 km/h; 26 mph), to a position about 100 nmi (190 km; 120 mi) south-east of the headland. The ship then turned south-west at 20 kn (37 km/h; 23 mph) towards the Equator, about 300 nmi (560 km; 350 mi) from the African coast. Farther west, the armed merchant cruiser HMS Hector, patrolled from the Equator to a position 300 nmi (560 km; 350 mi) to the south-west.

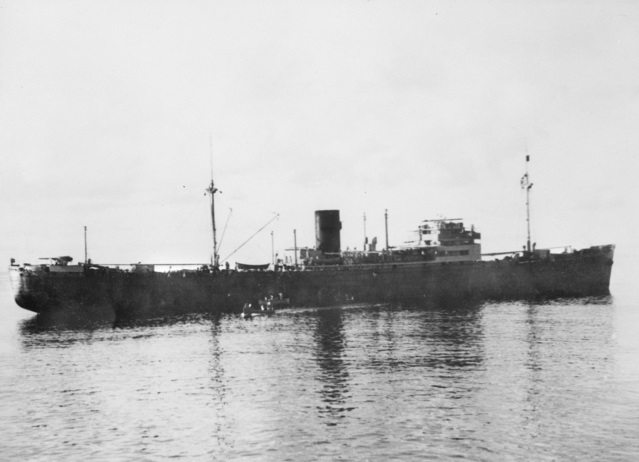
Pinguin in 1941

On the afternoon of 7 May, the two aircraft on Cornwall flew reconnaissance sorties for three hours and then altered course to get on the line of the main Vignot search. This was plotted for a mean speed of 13 kn (24 km/h; 15 mph) for an hour after the time of the raider report, assuming that the raider needed an hour to sink British Emperor and then depart at full speed until dark. At 9:30 p.m., Cornwall turned onto a bearing of east-south-east and slowed to search on this line, before the moon set. At dawn, Cornwall sent both aircraft to search an area three knots on either side of the raider's estimated speed and turned east at 18 kn (33 km/h; 21 mph) (steaming away from the raider).

At 7:07 a.m. on 8 May, one of the aircraft sighted a ship heading south-west at 13 kn (24 km/h; 15 mph), about 65 nmi (120 km; 75 mi) west of Cornwall but did not report the sighting until landing at about 8:00 a.m. At 8:25 a.m., Cornwall altered course to about west-by-south and increased speed to 23 kn (43 km/h; 26 mph). The second aircraft was launched again at 10:15 a.m. and at 12:23 p.m. it reported that the unknown ship was steaming at 15 kn (17 mph; 28 km/h) and had hoisted the signal letters of a Norwegian motor-vessel Tamerlane, which the raider resembled but was not on the list of expected ships.

== Action ==
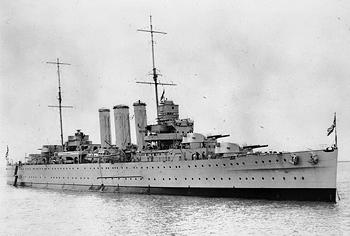
HMS Cornwall in 1929

Cornwall increased speed to 26 kn (48 km/h; 30 mph) then to 28 kn (52 km/h; 32 mph). At 1:45 p.m., an aircraft was launched to give the bearing, course and speed of the suspected ship by wireless; the ship came into sight at 4:07 p.m. The ship began transmitting raider reports, claiming to be Tamerlane. Despite orders to heave-to and two warning shots, the ship maintained course and speed for more than an hour, until the range was less than 12,000 yd (11,000 m). At 5:10 p.m., Cornwall turned to port and the suspected raider made a larger turn to port, opening fire with five guns just before 5:15 p.m.

Due to mechanical failures, Cornwall did not return fire for about two minutes and was frequently straddled by shells fired at a rapid rate, before firing two salvoes from the forward 8-inch turrets. The fore steering gear of Cornwall was disabled by a 5.9-inch shell hit and after going out of control for a moment, the after steering gear used. By 5:18 p.m., all of Cornwall's guns had opened fire, with the advantage of superior range finders and director fire-control systems, instead of local gun control. A salvo hit mines on Pinguin, blowing up the ship at 5:26 p.m. that sank at 03°30'N, 57°48'E 500 nmi (930 km; 580 mi) north of the Seychelles, about 300 nmi (560 km; 350 mi) from where it had sunk British Emperor.

== Aftermath ==
=== Analysis ===
The commerce-raiding voyage of the Pinguin had lasted from 22 June 1940 – 8 May 1941 and the ship sank or captured 28 ships of 136,642 GRT. About 50,000 GRT of shipping was sent to Germany as prizes. Cornwall returned to Durban for repairs until 10 June; the tactics of the captain of Cornwall in shadowing, attempted to identify and closing with Pinguin was criticised by the Admiralty. The crew of Pinguin had been skilful in disguising the ship and it was difficult to approach a suspicious, yet unidentified ship. A raider had the tactical advantage in deciding when to open fire, before it was unmasked and investigating ships courted danger if the vessel approached from a direction favourable to a raider's guns and torpedoes. Allied ships were given secret call signs and a system was devised for the investigating ship to refer to the Admiralty by wireless to verify ship identities. The new methods made ship identification much easier but took months to implement and similar events occurred when ships were either allowed to sail on and turned out to be raiders or were intercepted and sprang a surprise on the British warship.

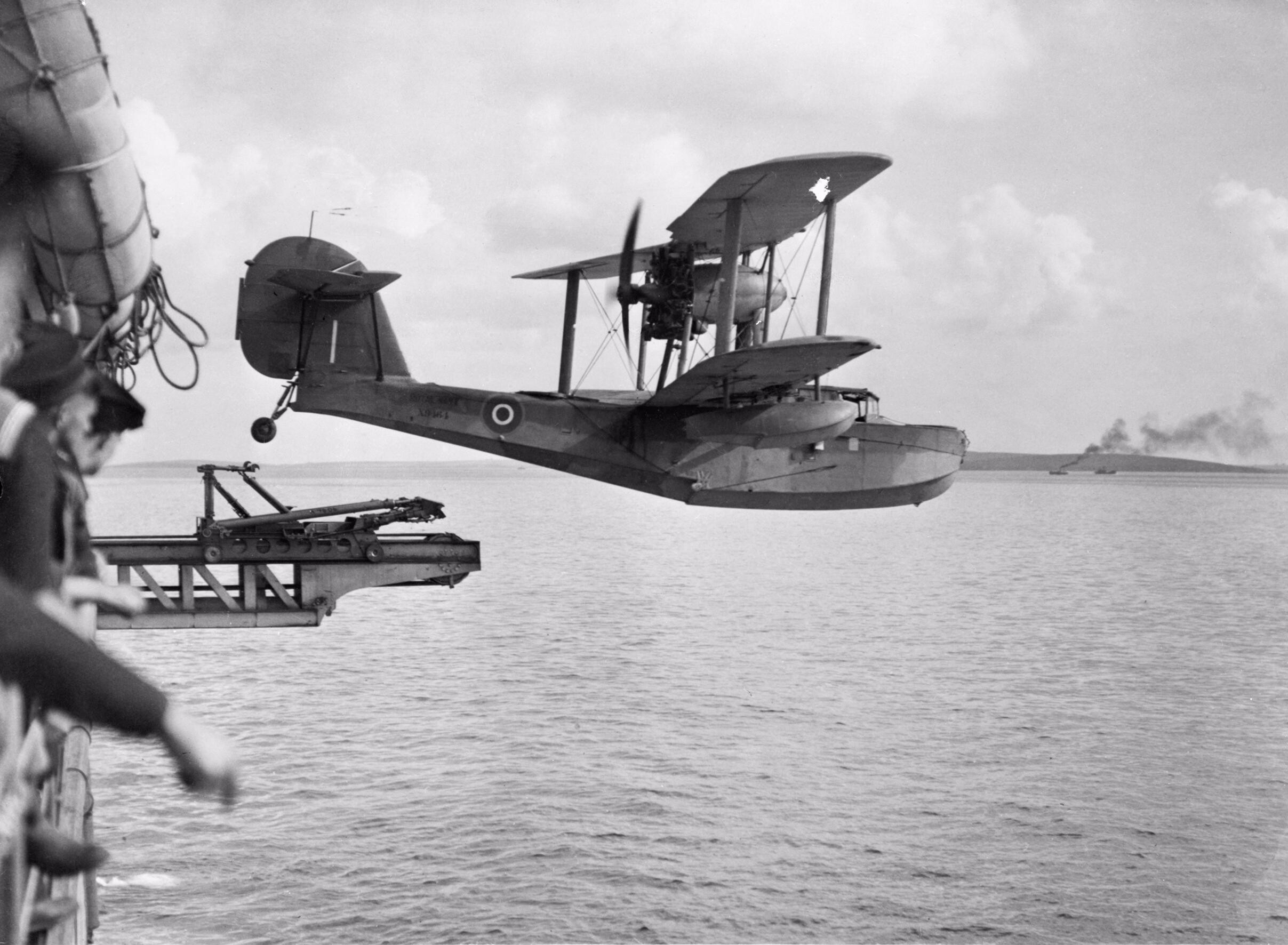
Example of a Walrus amphibian being catapulted from a cruiser (HMS Bermuda)

The success against Pinguin and other raiders was due to the navy Operational Intelligence Centre (OIC) of the Naval Intelligence Division, at the Admiralty. The OIC tracked raiders, based on the position of the sinking of Allied merchant ships and by collating rare sightings and distress signals. German commerce-raiders kept radio silence, avoided common shipping routes, searched for independently routed vessels and tried to prevent their victims from transmitting wireless messages. From May to November 1941, the Germans lost Pinguin and two more commerce raiders but Enigma decrypts by the Government Code and Cypher School (GC&CS) were only involved in one sinking.

German commerce-raiders used the Heimische Gewässer (Home Waters) Enigma settings, known as Dolphin to the British, before departing and when returning to Germany. The seven raiders at sea in May 1941 had sailed in 1940 before Enigma intelligence became available to the British. When at sea, Enigma-equipped raiders used the Ausserheimisch settings if they broke radio silence, which Hut 4 at Bletchley Park never managed to penetrate. Atlantis, the third raider lost in 1941, was sunk by HMS Devonshire on 22 November after the British read U-boat signals in the Heimische Gewässer setting, introduced in October 1941, to arrange a fuelling rendezvous.

=== Casualties ===
A British sailor, near the stern of Cornwall, was killed when Pinguin opened fire. Among the men on Pinguin were 222 British and Indian merchant sailors, captured from over thirty merchant vessels. Of the crew of 401 men, the captain and 322 others were killed and 60 were rescued, along with 22 of the Merchant Navy prisoners. In 2006, Roger Jordan wrote that 341 crew and prisoners were killed and that there were 87 survivors.

== Bibliography ==
- Forcyzk, Robert; Palmer, Ian (2010). German Commerce Raider vs British Cruiser: The Atlantic & the Pacific 1941. Oxford: Osprey. ISBN 978-1-84603-918-8.
- Hinsley, F. H. (1994) [1993]. British Intelligence in the Second World War. Its Influence on Strategy and Operations. History of the Second World War (2nd rev. abr. ed.). London: HMSO. ISBN 978-0-11-630961-7.
- Jordan, Roger W. (2006) [1999]. The World's Merchant Fleets 1939: The Particulars and Wartime Fates of 6,000 Ships (2nd ed.). London: Chatham/Lionel Leventhal. ISBN 978-1-86176-293-1.
- Rohwer, Jürgen; Hümmelchen, Gerhard (1992) [1972]. Chronology of the War at Sea, 1939–1945: The Naval History of World War Two (2nd rev. ed.). Annapolis, MD: Naval Institute Press. ISBN 978-1-55750-105-9.
- Roskill, S. W. (1957) [1954]. Butler, J. R. M. (ed.). The Defensive. History of the Second World War United Kingdom Military Series: The War at Sea 1939–1945. Vol. I (4th impr. ed.). London: HMSO. OCLC 881709135.
- Waters, S. D. (2016) [1956]. The Royal New Zealand Navy. Official History of New Zealand in the Second World War 1939–45 (online ed.). Wellington, NZ: War History Branch, Dept. of Internal Affairs. OCLC 11085179 – via New Zealand Electronic Text Centre.
