= Denton raft =

Buoyancy aid to enable life-saving

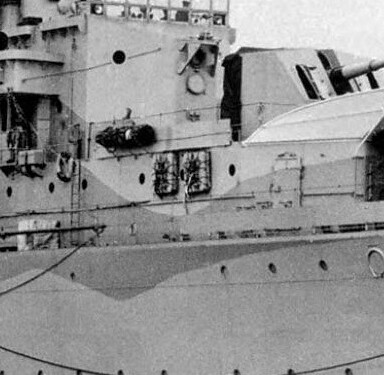
Denton rafts (close to the B turret) on HMS Saumarez 1943

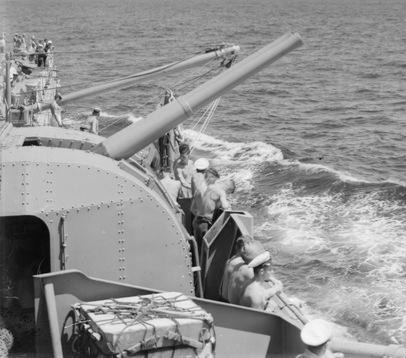
Denton rafts (lower left) on HMS Warspite 1942

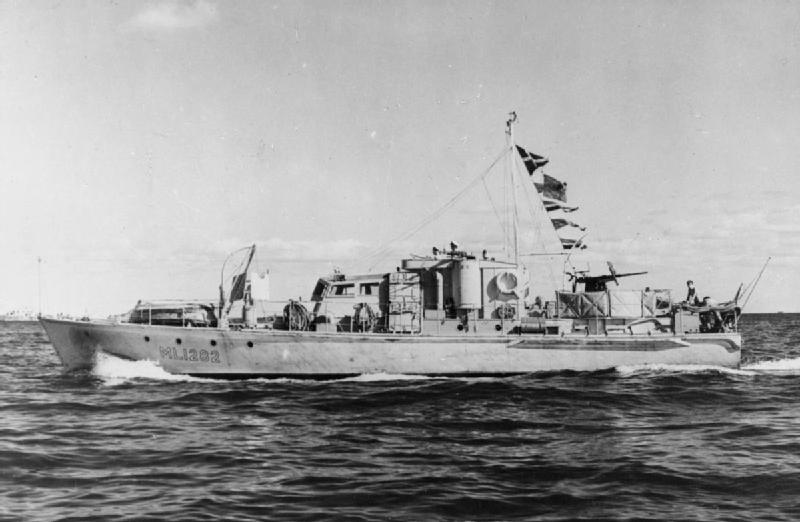
Two Denton rafts (rear of the cabin) on ML 1282

The Denton raft (the same as or similar to the Spanner Raft) was a buoyancy aid to enable life-saving. It was a square of cork, approximately 0.9 by 0.9 meters (3.0 by 3.0 ft), with an aperture in the middle and rope attachments to which sailors could cling. It was widely used by Royal Navy ships during World War II. HMS Hood was, for example, equipped with numerous Denton rafts and it was using Denton rafts that allowed three survivors to survive. The rafts were sometimes nicknamed biscuit rafts.
