= Navy House, Colombo =

Navy House

General information
- Location: Galle Buck Rd, Colombo-01, Colombo, Sri Lanka
- Client: Sri Lanka Navy

Navy House is the official residence of the Commander of the Sri Lanka Navy in Colombo. The present Navy House is a Class “A” type quarters constructed by the British Colonial Government of Ceylon to house government officials along Bullers Road. It is located next door to the General's House.

== See also ==
- Navy House, Trincomalee
