= W. G. Beauchamp =

Captain W. G. Beauchamp CBE, VRD
- Born: Willoughby Greaves Beauchamp; 5 April 1890; Madras, British India
- Died: 24 February 1960 (aged 69); Cork, Ireland
- Military career
- Allegiance: British India; British Ceylon
- Branch: British Indian Army; Ceylon Naval Volunteer Force/Royal Naval Volunteer Reserve
- Service years: 1917-1922; 1938–1946
- Rank: Captain
- Units: Ceylon Planters Rifle Corps; 54th Sikhs
- Commands: Commanding Officer of the Ceylon Royal Naval Volunteer Force

Captain Willoughby Greaves Beauchamp CBE, VRD (5 April 1890 – 24 February 1960) was a British merchant. He served as the Commanding Officer of the Ceylon Royal Naval Volunteer Force from its formation in 1938 to 1946.

Born to Willoughby James Beauchamp and Elizabeth Maria in Madras, Beauchamp was educated at Cheltenham College. He then moved to Ceylon becoming a Tea and Rubber merchant. There he was commissioned into the Ceylon Planters Rifle Corps.

He was commissioned into the Indian Army Reserve of Officers (Infantry Branch) on 8 August 1917. He was attached to the 1st battalion, 54th Sikhs on 3 November 1917. Promoted Lieutenant 8 August 1917, he was released in that rank and are permitted to retain the rank of Lieutenant, 1 May 1922.

By the late 1930s he was a Director and Chairman of J.M. Robertson & Co. Ltd in Colombo. When the Ceylon Naval Volunteer Force was formed on 1 January 1938, Beauchamp was commissioned a Commander and appointed its first commanding officer on 1 February 1938. Beauchamp served in this capacity till 31 March 1946, when he was placed in the retired list, having been absorbed to the Royal Naval Volunteer Reserve and promoted to the rank of Captain and was succeeded by Commander Royce de Mel. Chairman of the CRNVR Association, April – July 1956.

He was awarded the Volunteer Reserve Decoration and appointed a Commander of the Order of the British Empire (CBE) (military division) in the 1946 New Year Honours. His other medals include the British War Medal, Victory Medal, the Defense Medal, the War Medal 1939–1945 and the Ceylon Armed Services Inauguration Medal.

He married Kathleen Alice of Dr. W. B. Benison on 8 April 1912. They had three daughters.

Military offices
Preceded by Post Established	Commander of the Ceylon Naval Volunteer Force; 1938-1946	Succeeded by Royce de Mel
