= HMS Ceylon =

Two ships of the Royal Navy have borne the name HMS Ceylon, after the former British colony of Ceylon, now Sri Lanka. Two ships taken up from trade were also named Ceylon:

- HMS Ceylon was a 38-gun fifth rate launched as HCS Bombay in 1793, purchased by the Royal Navy in 1805, serving with them as HMS Bombay. She was renamed HMS Ceylon in 1808, converted to a troopship in 1813, eventually being sold in 1857.
- HMS Ceylon (30) was a Crown Colony-class light cruiser launched in 1942. She was sold to Peru in 1960 and renamed Coronel Bolognesi until being decommissioned in 1982 and broken up in 1985.

== Other ships ==
- Ceylon was a tug hired as an armed boarding steamer between 1914 and 1919.
- Ceylon was a private yacht requisitioned in 1915 and returned to her owners in 1916.
