= Commander of the Navy (Sri Lanka) =

Professional head of the Sri Lanka Navy

Commander of the Sri Lanka Navy
- ශ්‍රී ලංකා නාවික හමුදාපති
- Flag of the Sri Lankan Navy
- Incumbent; Vice Admiral Damian Fernando since 1 July 2026
- Sri Lanka Navy
- Abbreviation: CofN
- Member of: National Security Council
- Reports to: Minister of Defence
- Seat: Naval Headquarters
- Appointer: President of Sri Lanka
- Term length: Not fixed
- Constituting instrument: Navy Act (Chapter 358)
- Formation: 1 February 1938; 88 years ago as Commander of the Ceylon Naval Volunteer Force
- First holder: Captain W. G. Beauchamp (as Commander CNVF)
- Deputy: Chief of Staff of the Navy

The commander of the Navy is the professional head of the Sri Lanka Navy. The current commander of the Navy is Vice Admiral Kanchana Banagoda. It is a position equivalent to that of First Sea Lord of the Royal Navy or Chief of Naval Operations in the United States Navy.

By convention, serving Navy commanders have a rank of vice admiral, and will be promoted to the rank of admiral on retirement.

== History ==
The post of Captain of the Navy was created through the Navy Act of 9 December 1950, which also established the Royal Ceylon Navy.

In 1972, the "Dominion of Ceylon" became the "Democratic Socialist Republic of Sri Lanka" and the Royal Ceylon Navy was renamed the Sri Lanka Navy. The title "Captain of the Navy" was changed to "Commander of the Navy" through the Navy (Amendment) Law, No. 33 of 1976 in keeping with the terminology adopted by the other two services.

== Official residence ==
The official residences of the commander of the Navy is the Navy House in Colombo, formerly the Navy House in Trincomalee.

== List of commanders ==
The following table lists all those who have held the post of Commander of the Navy or its preceding positions. Ranks and honours are as at the completion of their tenure:

No.	Portrait	Name	Took office	Left office	Time in office	Ref.
Ceylon Naval Volunteer Force (1938–1950)
1	W. G. BeauchampCBE, VRD	Captain; W. G. Beauchamp; CBE, VRD (1890–1960)	1 February 1938	31 March 1946	8 years, 58 days	
2	Royce de MelOBE	Rear Admiral; Royce de Mel; OBE (1917–unknown)	31 March 1946	9 December 1950	4 years, 253 days	
Royal Ceylon Navy (1950–1972)
1	W. E. BanksDSC	Captain; W. E. Banks; DSC (1900–1986)	9 December 1950	25 November 1951	351 days	
2	J. R. S. Brown	Captain; J. R. S. Brown	26 November 1951	14 June 1953	1 year, 200 days	
3	P. M. B. ChavasseDSC	Captain; P. M. B. Chavasse; DSC (1908–1994)	15 June 1953	7 November 1955	1 year, 357 days	
4	Royce de MelOBE, ADC	Rear Admiral; Royce de Mel; OBE, ADC (1917–unknown)	15 August 1955	15 November 1960	5 years, 92 days	
5	Rajan KadiragamarMVO, ADC	Rear Admiral; Rajan Kadiragamar; MVO, ADC (1922–unknown)	16 November 1960	1 July 1970	9 years, 227 days	
Sri Lanka Navy (1972–present)
6	D. V. Hunter	Rear Admiral; D. V. Hunter (1917–unknown)	2 July 1970	31 March 1973	2 years, 272 days	
7	DeshamanyaBasil Gunasekara	Admiral; Deshamanya; Basil Gunasekara (1929–2024)	1 April 1973	31 May 1979	6 years, 60 days	
8	Henry PereraVSV	Admiral; Henry Perera; VSV (1930–2009)	1 June 1979	31 May 1983	4 years, 30 days	
9	Asoka de SilvaVSV	Vice Admiral; Asoka de Silva; VSV (1931–2006)	1 June 1983	31 October 1986	3 years, 152 days	
10	H. A. SilvaVSV	Admiral; H. A. Silva; VSV (1936–1999)	1 November 1986	31 October 1991	4 years, 364 days	
11	Clancy Fernando †VSV, USP	Admiral; Clancy Fernando †; VSV, USP (1938–1992)	1 November 1991	16 November 1992	1 year, 15 days	
12	D. A. M. R. SamarasekaraVSV, USP	Admiral; D. A. M. R. Samarasekara; VSV, USP (1948–2022)	16 November 1992	27 November 1997	5 years, 11 days	
13	H. C. A. C. ThiseraVSV, USP	Admiral; H. C. A. C. Thisera; VSV, USP (born 1947)	28 January 1997	31 December 2000	3 years, 338 days	
14	Daya SandagiriVSV, USP	Admiral; Daya Sandagiri; VSV, USP (born 1946)	1 January 2001	31 August 2005	4 years, 242 days	
15	Wasantha KarannagodaRSP, VSV, USP	Admiral of the Fleet; Wasantha Karannagoda; RSP, VSV, USP (born 1952)	1 September 2005	15 July 2009	3 years, 317 days	
16	Thisara SamarasingheRSP, VSV, USP	Admiral; Thisara Samarasinghe; RSP, VSV, USP (born 1955)	15 July 2009	15 January 2011	1 year, 184 days	
17	D. W. A. S. DissanayakeWV, RSP, VSV, USP	Admiral; D. W. A. S. Dissanayake; WV, RSP, VSV, USP (born 1956)	15 January 2011	27 September 2012	1 year, 256 days	
18	Jayanath ColombageRSP, VSV, USP	Admiral; Jayanath Colombage; RSP, VSV, USP (born 1957)	27 September 2012	30 June 2014	1 year, 276 days	
19	Jayantha PereraRWP, VSV, USP	Admiral; Jayantha Perera; RWP, VSV, USP	1 July 2014	10 July 2015	1 year, 9 days	
20	Ravindra WijegunaratneWV, RWP, RSP, VSV, USP	Admiral; Ravindra Wijegunaratne; WV, RWP, RSP, VSV, USP (born 1962)	11 July 2015	21 August 2017	2 years, 41 days	
21	Travis SinniahWWV, RWP, RSP, USP	Admiral; Travis Sinniah; WWV, RWP, RSP, USP	22 August 2017	26 October 2017	65 days	
22	Sirimevan RanasingheWWV, RWP, USP	Admiral; Sirimevan Ranasinghe; WWV, RWP, USP	26 October 2017	31 December 2018	1 year, 66 days	
23	Piyal De SilvaWWV, RWP, RSP, VSV, USP	Admiral; Piyal De Silva; WWV, RWP, RSP, VSV, USP	1 January 2019	14 July 2020	1 year, 195 days	
24	Nishantha UlugetenneRSP, VSV, USP	Admiral; Nishantha Ulugetenne; RSP, VSV, USP	15 July 2020	18 December 2022	2 years, 156 days	
25	Priyantha PereraRSP, USP	Admiral; Priyantha Perera; RSP, USP	19 December 2022	31 December 2024	2 years, 12 days	
26	Kanchana BanagodaRSP, USP	Admiral; Kanchana Banagoda; RSP, USP	31 December 2024	1 July 2026	1 year, 182 days	
27	Damian FernandoRSP, USP	Vice Admiral; Damian Fernando; RSP, USP	1 July 2026	Incumbent	68 days	

== See also ==
- Sri Lanka Navy
- Navy House, Colombo
- Navy House, Trincomalee
- Commander of the Army
- Commander of the Air Force
