= HMS Highflyer =

Four vessels of the British Royal Navy have been named HMS Highflyer.

- The first HMS Highflyer (1813) was an 8-gun schooner operating as an American privateer. In January 1813 HMS Poictiers captured her. The Royal Navy took Highflyer into service, retaining her name. The Americans recaptured her in September of that year.
- The second HMS Highflyer (1822) was a 2-gun tender in service from 1822 to 1833.
- The third HMS Highflyer (1851) was a wooden-hulled screw frigate launched in 1851 and broken up 1871.
- The fourth HMS Highflyer (1898) was a 2nd class cruiser launched 1898 and sold in 1921.
- Highflyer was also the name of the Royal Navy shore establishment in Trincomalee, Ceylon until 1958.
