= List of Sri Lanka Army regiments and corps =

This is a list of all combat and combat support regiments and corps of the Sri Lanka Army.

== Armoured ==
- Sri Lanka Armoured Corps

== Infantry ==
=== Regular Army ===
- Sri Lanka Light Infantry
- Sri Lanka Sinha Regiment
- Gemunu Watch
- Gajaba Regiment
- Vijayabahu Infantry Regiment
- Mechanized Infantry Regiment

=== Volunteer Force ===
- Sri Lanka Rifle Corps
- Sri Lanka National Guard

== Special Operations ==
- Commando Regiment
- Special Forces Regiment

== Support Arms and Services ==
=== Support Arms ===
- Sri Lanka Artillery
- Sri Lanka Engineers
- Sri Lanka Signals Corps

=== Services ===
- Military Intelligence Corps
- Engineer Services Regiment
- Sri Lanka Army Service Corps
- Sri Lanka Army Medical Corps
- Sri Lanka Army Ordnance Corps
- Sri Lanka Electrical and Mechanical Engineers
- Sri Lanka Corps of Military Police
- Sri Lanka Army General Service Corps
- Sri Lanka Army Women's Corps
- Sri Lanka Army Corps of Agriculture and Livestocks
- Sri Lanka Army Pioneer Corps

== Disbanded ==
- Ceylon Rifle Regiment
- Ceylon Mounted Rifles
- Ceylon Planters Rifle Corps
- Colombo Town Guard
- Rajarata Rifles
- Ruhunu Regiment
- National Service Regiment
- Post and Telegraph Signals
- President's Guard
- Ceylon Railway Engineer Corps
