= Hackle =

Military headgear accessory

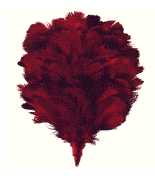
A Scottish hackle.

The hackle is a clipped plume or short spray of coloured feathers that is attached to a military headdress, with different colours being associated with particular regiments.

In the British Army and the armies of some Commonwealth countries, the hackle is worn by some infantry regiments, especially those designated as fusilier regiments and those with Scottish and Northern Irish origins.

The modern hackle has its origins in a much longer plume, originally referred to by its Scots name, heckle, which was commonly attached to the feather bonnet worn by Highland regiments (now usually only worn by drummers, pipers and bandsmen). The smaller version originated in a regimental emblem adopted by the 42nd Royal Highland Regiment, to be worn in the sun helmet issued in hot-weather postings from the 1870s.

== British Army ==
=== Hackle colours in British fusilier regiments ===
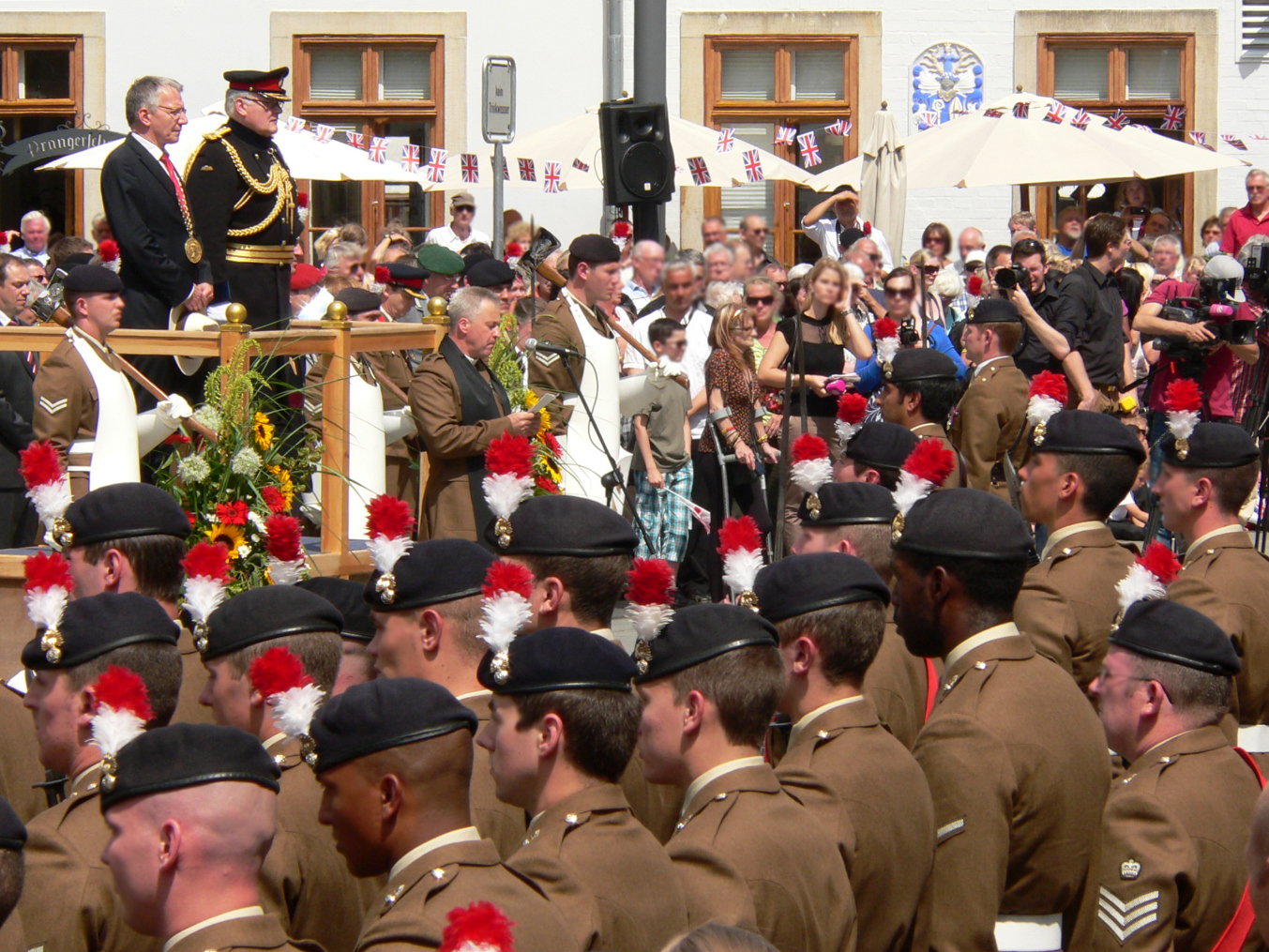
Soldiers of the Royal Regiment of Fusiliers.

==== Modern fusiliers ====
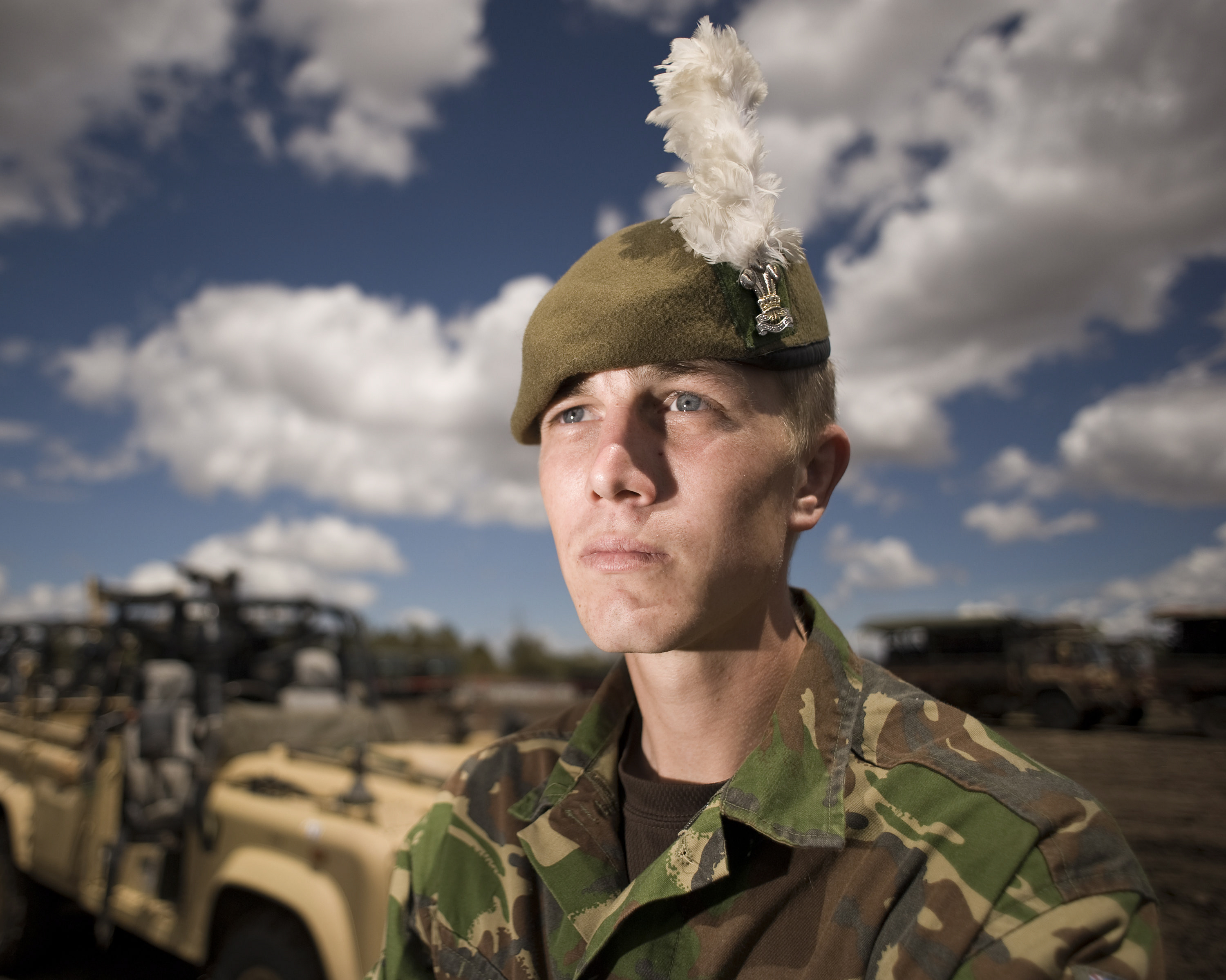
A Fusilier of the Royal Welsh

In the modern British Army, there is a single regiment of fusiliers, plus a battalion of a large regiment. Hackle colours are:

- Royal Regiment of Fusiliers: Red over white
- Royal Highland Fusiliers (a battalion of the Royal Regiment of Scotland): White

Other ranks of the Royal Welsh, the regiment that was formed by the amalgamation of the Royal Welch Fusiliers and Royal Regiment of Wales, continue to wear the white hackle of the Royal Welch Fusiliers.

==== Historical fusilier regiments ====
There were several other fusilier regiments which have been amalgamated and no longer exist. The hackle colours worn were as follows:

- Lancashire Fusiliers: Primrose
- Royal Fusiliers (City of London Regiment): White
- Royal Inniskilling Fusiliers: Grey
- Royal Irish Fusiliers: Green
- Royal Northumberland Fusiliers: Red over white
- Royal Scots Fusiliers: White
- Royal Warwickshire Fusiliers: Blue over old gold (orange)
- Royal Welch Fusiliers: White
- Royal Munster Fusiliers: White over green
- Royal Dublin Fusiliers: Green over blue

=== Non-fusilier regiments ===
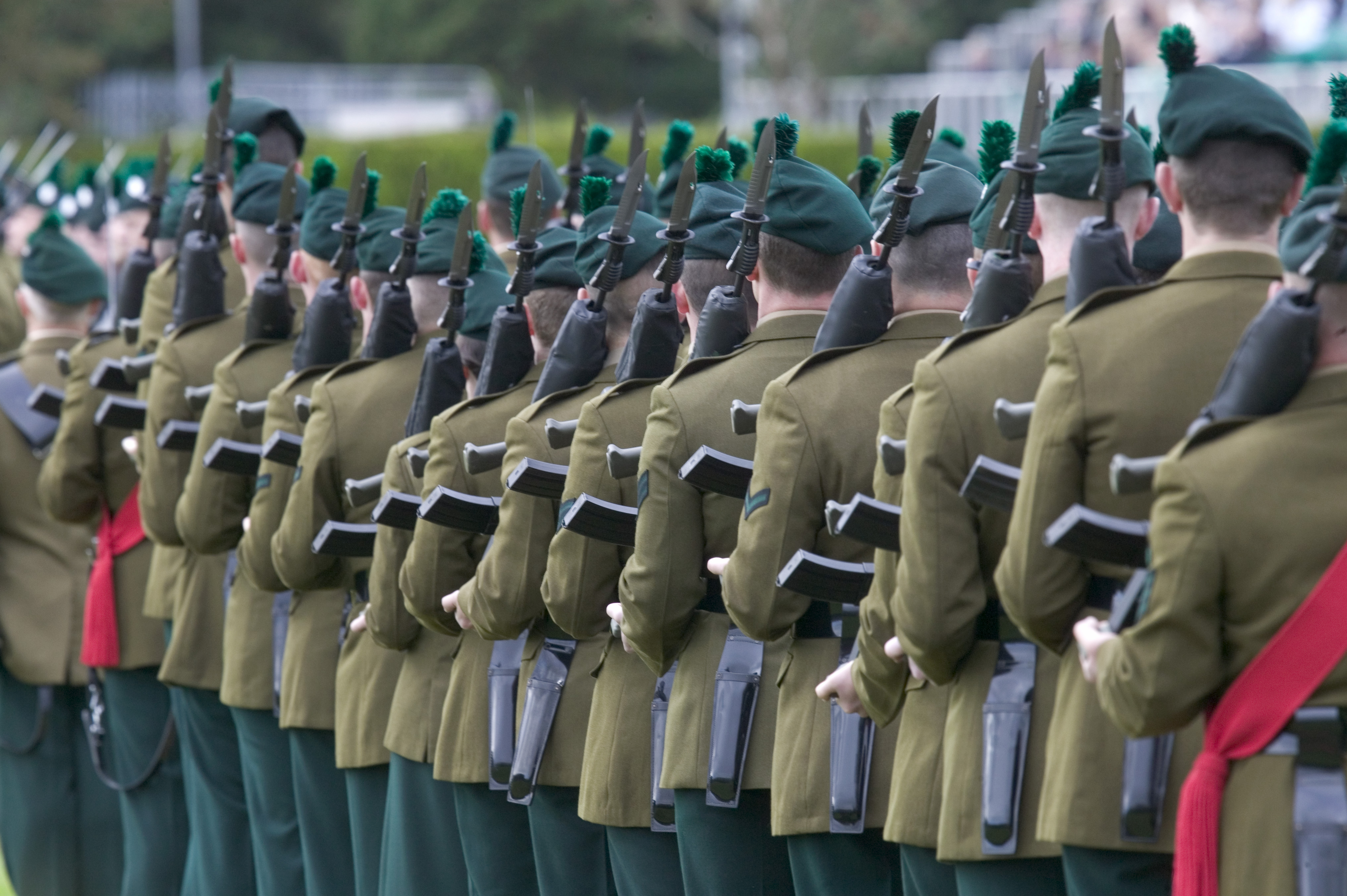
Soldiers of the Royal Irish Regiment

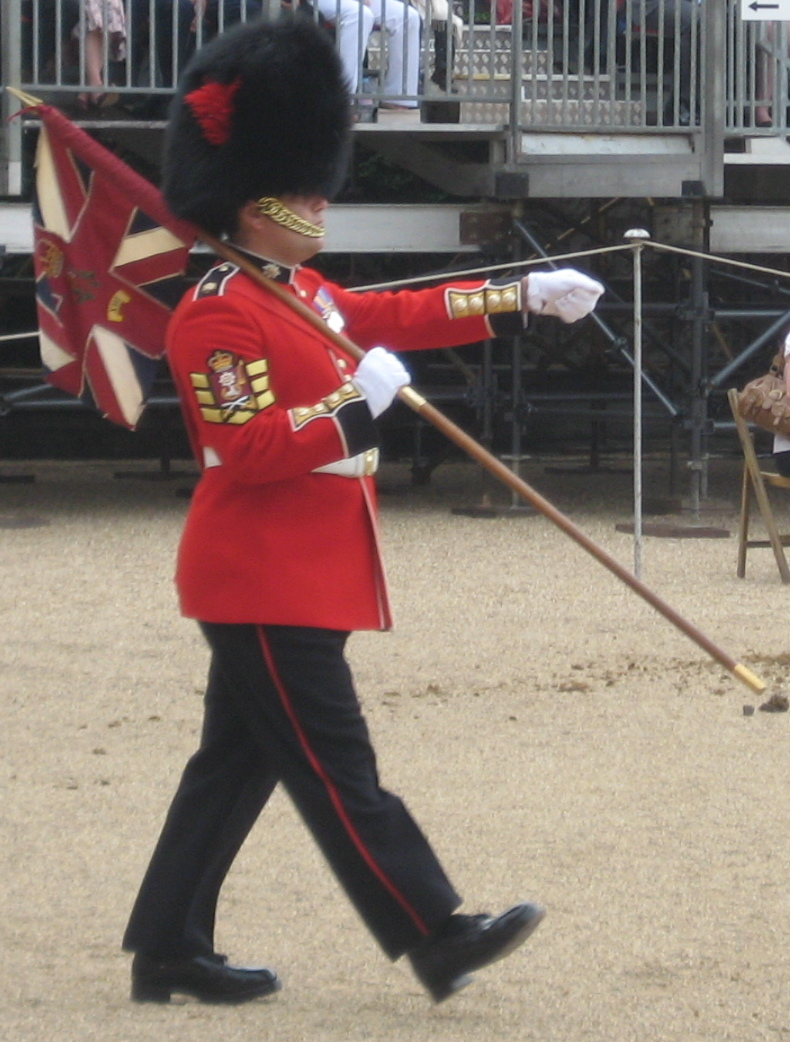
A Coldstream guardsman with an Army standard

Non-fusilier regiments which wear the hackle are:

- Coldstream Guards (bearskin only): Red
- Grenadier Guards (bearskin only): White
- Irish Guards (pipers on caubeen only): St Patrick's blue [Also worn on bearskin]
- Liverpool Scottish (now a platoon of A (Ladysmith) Company, 4th Bn Duke of Lancaster's Regiment): Royal blue
- Liverpool Irish (now A Troop of 208 Battery, 103rd Regiment Royal Artillery): Blue over red
- London Irish Rifles (now D (London Irish Rifles) Company, London Regiment): Green [Pipers wear St Patrick's blue]
- Royal Irish Regiment (as the direct descendant of two regiments of fusiliers): Green
- Royal Scots Dragoon Guards (on pipers' feather bonnet in Full Dress, pipers' / drummers' glengarry /atholl bonnet in No.1 and No.2 dress): White
- Royal Welsh (Other Ranks only): White
- Scots Guards (pipers on feather bonnet only): Blue over red
- The Queen's University Officers' Training Corps: St Patrick's Blue (A Coy Caubeen Only)
- Royal Air Force (pipe band only): Blue
- Welsh Guards (bearskin only): White-green-white

==== Royal Regiment of Scotland ====
Following the amalgamation of the regiments of the Scottish Division to form The Royal Regiment of Scotland on 28 March 2006, the following hackles are being worn by the regiment's constituent battalions:

- Royal Scots Borderers (1 SCOTS): Black
- Royal Highland Fusiliers (2 SCOTS): White
- Black Watch (3 SCOTS): Red
- The Highlanders (4 SCOTS): Blue
- Argyll and Sutherland Highlanders (5 SCOTS): Green
- 52nd Lowland Volunteers (6 SCOTS): Grey
- 51st Highland Volunteers (7 SCOTS): Purple

Whilst the white hackle of 2 SCOTS, red hackle of 3 SCOTS and blue hackle of 4 SCOTS have a known ancestry, the origin of 1 SCOTS black hackle and 5 SCOTS green hackle are not clear and have no apparent precedent. It may be that the black hackle of 1 SCOTS simulates the black-cock tail feathers originally worn in the 1904 pattern Kilmarnock Bonnet and latterly in the regimental Glengarry Cap by the Royal Scots and King's Own Scottish Borderers, who merged in August 2006 to form 1 SCOTS. Alternatively, it may be a sympathetic gesture to a former Lowland regiment, the Cameronians (Scottish Rifles), who went into 'suspended animation' in 1968 (and later disbanded), who wore a black hackle in their rifle green dress Balmoral. The adoption of the green hackle now being worn by the Argylls battalion (5 SCOTS) is no doubt a continuation of that regiment's association with the colour green, most prominent in the hue of their regimental kilts and stripes on their regimental association ties. (It is, however, worthy of note that in the 19th century, all line regiments of the British Army used to designate their "light company" with a green hackle.) The Regimental Band of the Royal Regiment of Scotland does not wear the hackle. However, the Highland Band of the Royal Regiment of Scotland (Territorial Army) continues to wear the red hackle with the Tam o' Shanter. Tradition holds that the black hackle originated as a Scottish tradition of wearing a black feather in your hat to signify you have an ongoing quarrel with someone.

==== Other regiments ====
Former non-fusilier regiments, now amalgamated, which also wore the hackle were:

- 40 (Ulster) Regiment, Royal Corps of Signals: Navy blue, sky blue and green.
- Argyll and Sutherland Highlanders: (feather bonnet only - drummers and drum major): White
- Argyll and Sutherland Highlanders: (Pipers only) Black cock feather
- Black Watch: Red
- The Cameronians (Scottish Rifles): Black
- Gordon Highlanders: Feather bonnet only - Drummers and drum major: White, Bandsmen: Red and white
- Gordon Highlanders: (Pipers only) black cock feather
- Highland Light Infantry: White over red
- The Highlanders (Seaforth, Gordons and Camerons): Royal blue
- The Highlanders (Seaforth, Gordons and Camerons): (feather bonnet only - drummers and drum major) White
- The Highlanders (Seaforth, Gordons and Camerons): (Pipers only) Eagle feather
- Queen's Own Cameron Highlanders: Royal blue
- Queen's Own Cameron Highlanders: (feather bonnet only - drummers and drum major) White
- Queen's Own Cameron Highlanders: (Pipers only) Eagle feather
- Queen's Own Highlanders (Seaforth and Camerons): Royal blue
- Queen's Own Highlanders (Seaforth and Camerons): (feather bonnet only - drummers and drum major) White
- Queen's Own Highlanders (Seaforth and Camerons): (Pipers only) Eagle feather
- Queen's Royal Irish Hussars (pipers on caubeen only): White over red
- Queen's Royal Hussars (pipers on caubeen only): White over red
- Royal Irish Rangers: Green
- Royal Corps of Transport (pipers on feather bonnet only): Red over white over blue
- Royal Ulster Rifles: Black
- Seaforth Highlanders (feather bonnet only - drummers and drum major): White
- Seaforth Highlanders (Pipers only) Black cock feather
- No. 9 Commando and No. 11 (Scottish) Commando: Black

==== Royal Navy ====
- HMS Montrose (F236): red. On 8 January every year, members of the ship's company wore a hackle to mark their alliance with the 3rd Battalion, Royal Regiment of Scotland.

== Other armies ==
=== Australian Army ===
There are five Army Reserve Regiments with Highland Companies in the Australian Army which wear the hackle:

- 2nd/17th Battalion, The Royal New South Wales Regiment
- 41st Battalion, The Royal New South Wales Regiment
- 5th/6th Battalion, The Royal Victoria Regiment
- 10th/27th Regiment, The Royal South Australia Regiment
- 16th Battalion, The Royal Western Australia Regiment

=== Canadian Army ===
Canadian infantry regiments are organized, titled and uniformed in full dress as foot guards, line and light infantry, fusiliers, rifles, and Scottish and kilted Irish infantry. All regiments, except for line and light infantry regiments, wear hackle or plume on their ceremonial uniform headdresses. Further, there are also line infantry regiments that dress as other type, thus wear hackle on their headdresses. These are Canadian Army infantry regiments and the colors of their hackle or plume.

Foot guards:

- The Governor General's Foot Guards: scarlet
- The Canadian Grenadier Guards: white

Line and light infantry:

- Royal 22^{e} Régiment (uniformed as fusiliers): scarlet
- The Royal Regiment of Canada (uniformed as foot guards): scarlet over white

Fusiliers:

- Les Fusiliers du S^{t}-Laurent: white
- Les Fusiliers Mont-Royal: white
- The Princess Louise Fusiliers: grey
- Les Fusiliers de Sherbrooke: white

Rifles:

- The Queen's Own Rifles of Canada: black over scarlet
- Les Voltigeurs de Québec: dark green
- The Brockville Rifles: black over scarlet
- The Royal Winnipeg Rifles: black
- The Royal Regina Rifles: black over scarlet

Scottish and kilted Irish infantry:

- The Black Watch (Royal Highland Regiment) of Canada: red
- The Royal Highland Fusiliers of Canada (notwithstanding title): white
- The Lorne Scots (Peel, Dufferin and Halton Regiment): primrose
- Stormont, Dundas and Glengarry Highlanders: white
- The Nova Scotia Highlanders: white
- The Cameron Highlanders of Ottawa (Duke of Edinburgh's Own): blue
- The Essex and Kent Scottish: white
- 48th Highlanders of Canada: white
- The Argyll and Sutherland Highlanders of Canada (Princess Louise's): white
- The Lake Superior Scottish Regiment: white
- The Queen's Own Cameron Highlanders of Canada: blue
- The Calgary Highlanders (10th Canadians): white
- The Seaforth Highlanders of Canada: white
- The Canadian Scottish Regiment (Princess Mary's): white
- The Irish Regiment of Canada: light blue for officers and CWOs, green for NCMs
- The Toronto Scottish Regiment (Queen Elizabeth The Queen Mother's Own): blue

=== Dutch Army ===
A few infantry regiments in the Dutch Army wear the hackle:

- Regiment Stoottroepen Prins Bernhard: Black
- Korps Commandotroepen: Black
- Regiment Limburgse Jagers: Red
- Regiment Infanterie Oranje Gelderland: Red
- Korps Luchtdoelartillerie Black over red

=== Indian Army ===
In the Indian Army, a few selected infantry regiments wear the hackle:

- 8th Gorkha Rifles: Red
- Brigade of the Guards: Red over yellow
- The Grenadiers: White
- Kumaon Regiment: Green
- Madras Regiment: Black
- Mahar Regiment: Dull cherry
- Maratha Light Infantry: Red over green
- Naga Regiment: Orange
- Rajput Regiment: Maroon over red
- National Cadet Corps: Red

=== Malaysian Army ===
- Royal Military College: Red (to be worn on Annual Passing Out parade only)
- Royal Ranger Regiment: Black

=== New Zealand Army ===
- Canterbury, and Nelson-Marlborough and West Coast Regiment: Green

=== Pakistan Army ===
- The Punjab Regiment: Green
- The Sindh Regiment: Red
- Northern Light Infantry: White with ceremonial headgear only
- Cadets at Pakistan Military Academy: Red over green
- 9th Battalion, Azad Kashmir Regiment: Red (commemorates the action in the Leepa Valley, Kashmir in 1972)

=== Sri Lanka Army ===
- Sri Lanka Armoured Corps: White and red
- Sri Lanka Light Infantry: White
- Sri Lanka Sinha Regiment: Black, yellow and green
- Gemunu Watch: Red
- Gajaba Regiment: Yellow
- Vijayabahu Infantry Regiment: Maroon, green and yellow
- Mechanized Infantry Regiment: Black and maroon
- Special Forces Regiment: Black and red
- Military Intelligence Corps: Dark blue, yellow, and dark green
- Sri Lanka Army Service Corps: Blue, white and yellow
- Sri Lanka Army Medical Corps: Hackle yellow, blue and dull cherry red
- Sri Lanka Army Ordnance Corps: Red, yellow and blue
- Sri Lanka Electrical and Mechanical Engineers: Oxford blue, golden yellow and signal red
- Sri Lanka Army General Service Corps: Blue and saffron
- Sri Lanka Army Women's Corps: Beach brown
- Sri Lanka Rifle Corps: Green and yellow
- Sri Lanka Army Pioneer Corps: Green and red
- Sri Lanka National Guard: Red, white and blue

=== South African Army ===
Scottish- and Irish-influenced regiments which wear the hackle include:

- South African Irish Regiment: Green
- Transvaal Scottish Regiment: Red
- Witwatersrand Rifles: Black

=== Swedish Army ===
- Life Guards: Grenadiers wear white hackles on their bearskins.

=== United States Army ===
- United States Military Academy: Cadet Officers wear black hackles on their shakos for parades.
