= Deputy Chief of Staff of the Sri Lanka Army =

Deputy Chief of Staff of the Army
- Incumbent; Major General Manada Yahampath
- Sri Lanka Army
- Type: 3rd most senior army post
- Status: Two star general
- Abbreviation: DCOS
- Reports to: Commander of the Army
- Residence: Colombo
- Seat: Army HQ
- Nominator: President of Sri Lanka
- Appointer: President of Sri Lanka
- Term length: Not fixed
- Formation: 1994

Deputy Chief of Staff of the Army (DCOS) has been the title of the third in command of the Sri Lanka Army created in 1994. The post is held by a regular officer of the rank of Major General and is the third senior position in the army. Deputy of Staff is charged with assisting the Chief of Staff of the Army in both operational and administrative aspects.

== List of Deputy Chiefs of Staff ==
No	Deputy Chief of Staff	Took office	Left office	Unit of commission	Notes
1	Major General Rohan Daluwatte	1994	1 June 1995	Ceylon Armoured Corps	Later Major General Rohan Daluwatte was appointed as 26th Chief of Staff of Sri Lanka Army and later as 14th Commander of the Army and promoted to Lieutenant General. On his retirement he was promoted to General.
2	Major General W. R. Wijerathne	1995	1995	Gemunu Watch	
3	Major General A. M. U. Seneviratne	1995	30 April 1996	Ceylon Light Infantry	Later Major General A. M. U. Seneviratne was appointed as 27th Chief of Staff of Sri Lanka Army.
4	Major General Gemunu Kulatunge	1996	October 1996	Ceylon Sinha Regiment	
5	Major General Srilal Weerasooriya	October 1996	22 February 1998	Ceylon Artillery	Later Major General Srilal Weerasooriya was appointed as 29th Chief of Staff of Sri Lanka Army and later as 15th Commander of the Army and promoted to Lieutenant General. On his retirement he was promoted to General.
6	Major General Jaliya Nammuni	1998	6 September 1998	Ceylon Sinha Regiment	
7	Major General Asoka Jayawardena	6 September 1998	12 November 1998	Ceylon Light Infantry	
8	Major General S. T. T. (Sathis) Jayasundera			Rajarata Rifles / Gajaba Regiment	
9	Major General L. P. Balagalle	February 1999	1 April 1999	Ceylon Artillery	Later Major General Lionel Balagalle was appointed as 31st Chief of Staff of Sri Lanka Army and later as 16th Commander of the Army and promoted to Lieutenant General. On 10 October 2003, he was appointed as Chief of the Defence Staff (CDS) as serving army commander.
10	Major General Janaka Perera	1999 April	14 June 2000	Ceylon Engineers	Later Major General Janaka Perera was appointed as 32nd Chief of Staff of Sri Lanka Army
11	Major General Neil Dias	June 2000	1 February 2001	Ceylon Armoured Corps	Later Major General Neil Dias appointed as 33rd Chief of Staff of Sri Lanka Army.
12	Major General Lohan Gunawardena	1 February 2001	13 April 2002	Gemunu Watch	Later Major General Lohan Gunawardena appointed as 34th Chief of Staff of Sri Lanka Army.
13	Major General A.E.D. Wijendra	13 April 2002	31 August 2003	Sri Lanka Engineers	
14	Major General Shantha Kottegoda	13 August 2003	23 November 2003	Ceylon Light Infantry	Later Major General Shantha Kottegoda was appointed as 35th Chief of Staff of Sri Lanka army and later as 17th Commander of the Army and promoted to Lieutenant General. On his retirement he was promoted to General.
15	Major General Chula Seneviratne	23 November 2003	30 June 2004	Ceylon Signals Corps	Later Major General Chula Seneviratne was appointed as 36th Chief of Staff of Sri Lanka army.
16	Major General Sarath Fonseka	1 July 2004	9 December 2004	Sri Lanka Sinha Regiment	Later Major General Sarath Fonseka was appointed as 37th Chief of Staff of Sri Lanka Army and later as 18th Commander of the Army and promoted to Lieutenant General. At the end of the war he was promoted to General, becoming the first army commander to hold a full General rank. On 15 July 2009 he was the first person appointed CDS under the newly approved Chief of Defence Staff Act. On On 22 March 2015, he was promoted to Field Marshal.
17	Major General M.D.S. Chandrapala	9 December 2004	6 December 2005	Sri Lanka Engineers	
18	Major General Parami Kulatunga	6 December 2005	24 June 2006 †	Gemunu Watch	Major General Kulatunga was posthumously promoted to the rank of lieutenant general effective from 28 June 2006.
19	Major General D.V.S.Y. Kulatunga	24 July 2006	3 February 2007	Sri Lanka Armoured Corps	
20	Major General N Wijesinghe	3 February 2007	5 February 2008	Sri Lanka Artillery	
21	Major General Upul Perera	7 May 2009	29 January 2010	Sri Lanka Electrical and Mechanical Engineers	
22	Major General A.L.R. Wijetunga	22 November 2010	11 July 2012	Sri Lanka Electrical and Mechanical Engineers	
23	Major General Piyal Abeysekera	12 July 2012	8 May 2014	Sri Lanka Signals Corps	
24	Major General Mahinda Ambanpola	2 June 2014	15 February 2016	Engineer Services Regiment	
25	Major General K.A.S. Perera	16 February 2016	30 September 2016	Rajarata Rifles / Gajaba Regiment	
26	Major General Channa Gunathilaka	1 November 2016	15 December 2016	Sri Lanka Engineers	Later Major General Channa Gunathilaka was appointed as 49th Chief of Staff of Sri Lanka army.
27	Major General R.V. Udawatte	15 December 2016	July 2017	Sri Lanka Army Ordnance Corps	
28	Major General Dampath Fernando	4 August 2017	26 March 2018	Gemunu Watch	Later Major General Dampath Fernando was appointed as 52nd Chief of Staff of Sri Lanka army.
29	Major General Ajith Kariyakarawana	18 April 2018	21 April 2019	Vijayabahu Infantry Regiment	
30	Major General Vajira Palihakkara	April 2018	June 2019		*Acting Deputy Chief of Staff
31	Major General Kumudu Perera	4 July 2019	29 October 2019	Sri Lanka Sinha Regiment	
32	Major General Nirmal Dharmaratne	22 November 2019	19 April 2020	Gajaba Regiment	
33	Major General Rasika Fernando	2 June 2020	30 September 2020	Gajaba Regiment	
34	Major General Duminda Sirinaga	1 October 2020	8 January 2021	Sri Lanka Electrical and Mechanical Engineers	
35	Major General Wasantha Madola	14 January 2021	7 September 2021	Sri Lanka Corps of Military Police	
36	Major General Sampath Kotuwegoda	8 September 2021	21 December 2021	Sri Lanka Artillery	
37	Major General Jagath Kodithuwakku	21 December 2021	7 June 2022	Sri Lanka Light Infantry	Later Major General Jagath Kodithuwakku was appointed as 60th Chief of Staff of Sri Lanka army.
38	Major General Channa Weerasuriya	16 June 2022	29 November 2022	Sri Lanka Light Infantry	Later Major General Channa Weerasuriya was appointed as 61st Chief of Staff of Sri Lanka army.
39	Major General Sujeewa Senarath Yapa	14 December 2022	8 June 2023	Sri Lanka Army Special Forces Regiment	
40	Major General Sanjaya Wanasinghe	8 June 2023	14 July 2023	Sri Lanka Artillery	Later Major General Sanjaya Wanasinghe was appointed as 62nd Chief of Staff of Sri Lanka Army.
41	Major General C.D Ranasinghe	18 July 2023	27 October 2023	Gajaba Regiment	
42	Major General G.R.R.P Jayawardena	21 November 2023	08 December 2023	Sri Lanka Sinha Regiment	
43	Major General S.P.A.I.M.B Samarakoon	15 December 2023	November 2024	Sri Lanka Electrical and Mechanical Engineers	
44	Major General Lasantha Rodrigo	28 November 2024	30 December 2024	Sri Lanka Artillery	Later Major General B.K.G.M.L Rodrigo was appointed as 25th Commander of the Army and promoted to Lieutenant General.
45	Major General Chandana Wickramasinghe	2 January 2025	8 February 2025	Gajaba Regiment	Later Major General Chandana Wickramasinghe was appointed as 66th Chief of Staff of Sri Lanka Army.
46	Major General Lanka Amarapala	14 February 2025	25 June 2025	Sri Lanka Engineers	
47	Major General Y.A.B.M. Yahampath RWP, RSP	26 June 2025	1 April 2026	Sri Lanka Light Infantry	Later Major General Y.A.B.M. Yahampath was appointed as 68th Chief of Staff of Sri Lanka Army.
48	Major General K.V.N.P. Premaratne RSP, USP	6 April 2026	31 May 2026	Sri Lanka Artillery	Later Major General K.V.N.P. Premaratne was appointed as 69th Chief of Staff of Sri Lanka Army and later appointed as 26th Commander of the Army and promoted to Lieutenant General.
49	Major General U.K.D.D.P. Udugama RWP, RSP, USP	2 June 2026	3 August	Gajaba Regiment	Later Major General U.K.D.D.P. Udugama was appointed as 70th Chief of Staff of Sri Lanka Army.
50	Major General J.S.B.W. Pallekumbura RWP, RSP	24 August 2026	6 October 2026	Gajaba Regiment	
51	Major General K.J.N.M.P.K. Nawarathna RWP, RSP	27 October 2026	To Date	Gemunu Watch	
