= 21 Division (Sri Lanka) =

Coordinates: 8°18′31.50″N 80°25′39.50″E

- 21 Division flag
- Active: 4 April 1988 – present
- Country: Sri Lanka
- Branch: Sri Lanka Army
- Type: Division (military)
- Size: 23,208
- Part of: Security Forces Headquarters – Wanni
- Division Headquarters: Anuradhapura, North Central Province

Commanders
- Current commander: Major General W R M M Rathnayake

The 21 Division is a division of the Sri Lanka Army. Established on 4 April 1988 as 2nd Division, the division is currently based in Anuradhapura in the North Central Province. The division is a part of Security Forces Headquarters – Wanni and has three brigades and seven battalions. The division is responsible for 7,100 square kilometres (2,741 sq mi) of territory.

== Organisation ==
The division is currently organised as follows:

- 211 Brigade
  - 22nd Battalion, Gajaba Regiment (based in Pampeimadu, Northern Province)
  - 2nd Volunteer Battalion, Vijayabahu Infantry Regiment
  - 4th Volunteer Battalion, Sri Lanka Army Women's Corps (based in Medawachchiya, North Central Province)
- 212 Brigade
  - 7th Volunteer Battalion, Sri Lanka Armoured Corps
  - 9th Volunteer Battalion, Corps of Engineer Services
  - 2nd Volunteer Battalion, Sri Lanka Army Women's Corps (based in Anuradhapura, North Central Province)
- 213 Brigade
  - 24th Volunteer Battalion, Sri Lanka Light Infantry
  - 25th Battalion, Vijayabahu Infantry Regiment
