= Chaminda Ruwan Yakandawala =

Sri Lankan soldier

Chaminda Ruwan Yakandawala †
- Born: November 23, 1973; Watawala, Matale
- Died: April 25, 2006 (aged 32); Colombo
- Military career
- Allegiance: Sri Lanka
- Branch: Sri Lanka Army
- Service years: 1987-1996
- Rank: Sergeant
- Unit: Sri Lanka Corps of Military Police
- Conflicts: Sri Lankan Civil War

Sergeant Yakandawala Liyanarachchige Chaminda Ruwan Yakandawala was a Sri Lankan soldier. A member of the Sri Lanka Army Military Police he was selected to serve in the Security Division of the Commander of the Sri Lanka Army, Sarath Fonseka. On April 25, 2006, he blocked the path of a Tamil Tiger suicide bomber tasked with assassinating Fonseka. Unable to proceed, the suicide bomber detonated the explosives strapped around her waist, killing Yakandawala and eight others in the process. Yakandawala's quick actions however saved the life of Sarath Fonseka, who would go on to play a crucial role in the ultimate defeat of the Tamil Tigers and the ending of the Sri Lankan Civil War.

== Background ==
Yakandawala Liyanarachchige Chaminda Ruwan Yakandawala was born in the village of Watawala on November 23, 1971, the third of four children. He attended Ginigathena Madhya Maha Vidyalaya until his GCE Ordinary Level examinations, after which he applied to join both the Sri Lanka Army and the Sri Lanka Police. Selected to both services, he decided to join the Sri Lanka Army, and enlisted in October 1991. He trained at the Army engineering school in Embilipitiya and Panagoda, after which he was mobilized as a military policeman. He was also a boxer for the Army.

In 1994, Yakandawala married Nishanthi Kumburegama, who was a physical training instructor with the Sri Lanka Army Women's Corps. They had three children together.

== Military career ==
Promoted to the rank of Lance Corporal in January 1993, Yakandawala served in the army during the Rivirasa operation in 1995, and was awarded a medal for his bravery on the battlefield. He was subsequently selected to serve in the Security Division of the Commander of the Army. After undergoing training as a motor-cycle VIP escort, he joined the riding team of the Army Commander's escort in May 1996. Yakandawala provided security to three Army Commanders beginning with Rohan Daluwatte. He was promoted to Corporal in January 2001.

== Suicide attack ==
On April 25, 2006, the Commander of the Sri Lanka Army Lt. General Sarath Fonseka was leaving the Sri Lanka Army Headquarters around 1.30 pm. Yakandawala was one of the outriders providing security to Fonseka. A Tamil Tiger suicide bomber later identified as Kanapathipillai Manjula Devi gained entrance into the Army headquarters compound by pretending to be a pregnant woman attending the maternity clinic at the Army Hospital, which was located inside the Headquarters compound. Dressed in a blue shalvari suit with a suicide belt containing large razor balls and more than a kilogram of C-4 strapped around her waist, she waited outside for Fonseka to leave his office. As Fonseka's car approached, Manjula ran towards it. Noticing the danger, Yakandawala yelled at her to move away. As she continued running toward the vehicle, Yakandawala kicked out at her, knocking her to the ground. Devi then detonated the explosives strapped on to her.

== Aftermath ==
Nine people were killed in the explosion, including Yakandawala, who had razor balls pierce his neck, destroying his trachea. Corporal Priyanjan Viraj, who was on the same bike at Yakandawala was also killed in the explosion. Fonseka suffered serious abdominal injuries in the attack, but his life was saved following emergency surgery at the Colombo National Hospital. He regained consciousness on April 30.

After recovered from his injuries, Fonseka resumed duties as Commander of the Army on July 31, 2006. He then led the Sri Lanka Army on a three-year-long campaign to defeat the Tamil Tigers and end the decades long Sri Lankan Civil War. Under Fonseka, the Sri Lanka Army achieved its goal in May 2009, wiping out the Tamil Tigers and killing all major leaders of the organization, thereby ending the Sri Lankan Civil War.

== See also ==
- Terrorism
- List of attacks attributed to the LTTE
- W. I. M. Seneviratne
