= Sri Lanka Army General Service Corps =

- Active: 14 December 1951 - Present
- Country: Sri Lanka
- Branch: Sri Lanka Army
- Role: General Administrative Service
- Size: 4 Units
- Regimental Centre: Panagoda
- Colors
- Anniversaries: 01 December Regimental day)
- Engagements: 1971 Insurrection; Insurrection 1987-89; Sri Lankan Civil War
- Website: https://alt.army.lk/slagsc/

Commanders
- Colonel Commandant: Brigadier M K S S De Silva
- Centre Commandant: Colonel C S Demuni
- Notable commanders: Lt Col B.J Wijemanne MBE, ED

The Sri Lanka Army General Service Corps (SLAGSC) a corps of the Sri Lanka Army. The corps carries out much of the administrative work of the army. The role of the Corps is to provide logistic backing to Regular and Volunteer units by performing Financial/ Accounting Services, pay duties, legal services, running of agriculture projects and farms etc. Therefore, it is made up of Accountants, Legal Officers, Agriculture Offices, data processing officers and other ranks specialized in those fields. It is made up of a 3 regular units and 3 volunteer (reserve) units and is headquartered at its Regiment Center at the Panagoda Cantonment, Panagoda.

== Directorates and Branches ==
- Directorate of Internal Audit
- Directorate of Budget & Financial Management
- Directorate of Pay & Records.
- Directorate of Legal Services.
- Army Band and cultural troupe.
- Financial Management Branch.

== History ==
The Ceylon Army General Service Corps was raised on 14 December 1951 with Lt. Col B.J Wijemanne, MBE, ED as first Commanding Officer. The unit was then administered by the headquarters company of the Army HQ. The Pay and Records Wing which was established on 14 October 1949 and the Education Branch were amalgamated in 1954. The Army Education Branch was instrumental in translating army forms, preparation of a comprehensive Sinhala vocabulary and teaching Sinhala to those who were yet conversant in the language.

The Army Band was formed on 22 June 1950 with Lt (Quarter Master) George Perry, a seconded officer form the British Army and 28 local bandsmen. In 1955 the then Acting Commander of the Army Col. (later Major General) H. W. G. Wijeyekoon, OBE, ED initiated the forming of the Hewisi Band along with Lt C. T. Caldera, CLI and Lionel Edirisinghe who was one of Sri Lanka's foremost musicians. S/Sgt Wickramasinghe D. was the first Bandmaster. The cultural troupe of the National Service Regiment (NSR) under Captain Clarence Delwela was absorbed into the SLAGSC when the NSR was disbanded in 1977. Today, the regiment has three bands which take part in all military ceremonials in the country and a cultural troupe.

In 1956 a small farm was established at Panagoda which was the beginning of the farm projects in the Army. Maj. R Wijesinghe (later Colonel) was the pioneer agriculturist and the main figure behind the successful farm projects in the Army. Since then the army farms are also a part of the corps responsibility and they provide most of their produce to the Service Corps.

== Units ==
=== Regular Army ===
- 1st Sri Lanka Army General Service Corps
- 3rd Sri Lanka Army General Service Corps
- 4th Sri Lanka Army General Service Corps
- Trade School Sri Lanka Army General Service Corps - kuttigala

=== Volunteers ===
- 2nd (v) Sri Lanka Army General Service Corps (Formed on 1 December 1996)

== Notable members ==
- Lt. Colonel Daya Perera, PC - Sri Lankan High Commissioner to Canada and former Ambassador to the United Nations in New York City

== Order of precedence ==
Preceded by Sri Lanka Corps of Military Police	Order of Precedence	Succeeded by Sri Lanka Army Women's Corps

== See also ==
- Sri Lanka Army

== External links and sources ==
- Sri Lanka Army
- Sri Lanka Army General Service Corps
