= C. A. M. N. Silva =

Sri Lanka Army officer (1933–2019)

- Born: 4 July 1933; Colombo, Ceylon
- Died: 20 February 2019 (aged 85); Colombo, Sri Lanka
- Military career
- Allegiance: Sri Lanka
- Branch: Sri Lanka Army
- Service years: 1952–1988
- Rank: Major General
- Service number: O/50149
- Unit: Sri Lanka Light Infantry
- Commands: Chief of Staff of the Army, Commandant of the Volunteer Force, Support Forces, Logistical Command, South Eastern Command, Kotelawala Defence Academy, Army Training Center, 1st Battalion, Sri Lanka Light Infantry
- Conflicts: 1971 Insurrection; Sri Lankan Civil War
- Awards: Vishista Seva Vibhushanaya

Major General C. A. Mike N. Silva, VSV (4 July 1933 – 20 February 2019) was a senior Sri Lanka Army officer who served as the Chief of Staff of the Army and the Commandant of the Volunteer Force. He was the first Commandant of the Kotelawala Defence Academy.

== Early life and education ==
Born on 4 July 1933 in Colombo, Silva was educated Ananda College, where he took part in athletics and served as a corporal in the college cadet platoon.

== Military career ==
Silva joined the newly formed Ceylon Army on 20 August 1952, received his basic officer training at the Royal Military Academy, Sandhurst. He was commissioned as a Second Lieutenant and posted to the Ceylon Light Infantry on 5 August 1954. He was promoted Lieutenant in 1956 and Captain in1959. He thereafter underwent a mortar training course the Infantry Training School, Wiltshire and basic tactics training course at the Combined Arms Training Centre, Warminster between January 1960 and August 1960. He was promoted to the rank of Major in 1963 and to Lieutenant Colonel in May 1973. He served as the acting commanding officer of the Ceylon Corps of Military Police from July 1970 to November 1971, Deputy Commandant (Administration) of the National Service Regiment, before serving as commanding officer of the 1st Battalion, Sri Lanka Light Infantry from March 1976 to October 1978. Promoted to the rank of Colonel in October 1978, he served as Commandant, Army Training Center from 1978 to 1981. He was then appointed the first Commandant of the Kotelawala Defence Academy in 1981, before attending the United States Army War College.

On his return to Sri Lanka in 1983, he was dispatched to Jaffna following the ambush of Four Four Bravo. Promoted to the rank of Brigadier in November 1983, he went on the command the South Eastern Command, the Logistical Command and the Support Forces, before appointment as Commandant of the Volunteer Force. He then served as the Chief of Staff of the Army 15 December 1987 to 4 July 1988 when he retired from the army, having been promoted to the rank of Major General in April 1988.

Major General Silva had received the Vishista Seva Vibhushanaya (VSV), Ceylon Armed Services Long Service Medal in 1968, the Republic of Sri Lanka Armed Services Medal in 1972, Sri Lanka Army 25th Anniversary Medal in 1974, the President's Inauguration Medal in 1978, the Sri Lanka Armed Services Long Service Medal in 1979, and the Purna Bhumi Padakkama.
