= Sri Lankan military bands =

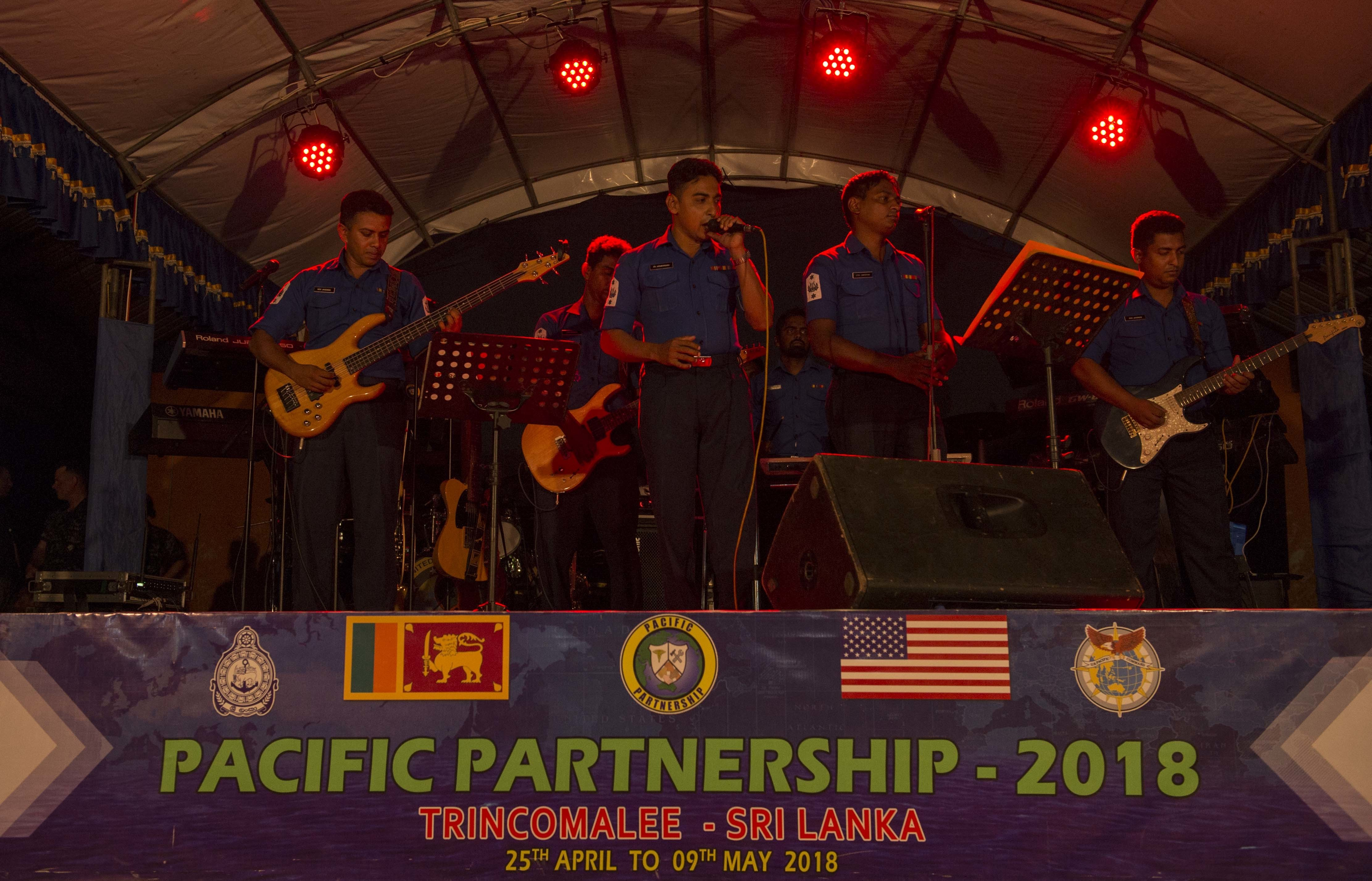
Members of the Sri Lanka Navy Band perform at Mattur Public Grounds during a community relations event in 2018.

Sri Lankan military bands (Sinhala: ශ්රී ලංකා යුද හමුදා කණ්ඩායම) refer to the joint-service musical units of the Sri Lanka Armed Forces representing the Sri Lanka Army, the Sri Lanka Navy, and the Sri Lanka Air Force. The three bands mentioned, which were established in 1949, 1952 and 1970 respectively and are the seniormost in the armed forces. They are composed of many ceremonial marching bands as well as concert bands which are base for the band's success. The band participates in main social and cultural events, including formal state visits and military parades. All army regiments also contain a regimental band for ceremonial duties.

== Types of Sri Lankan military bands ==
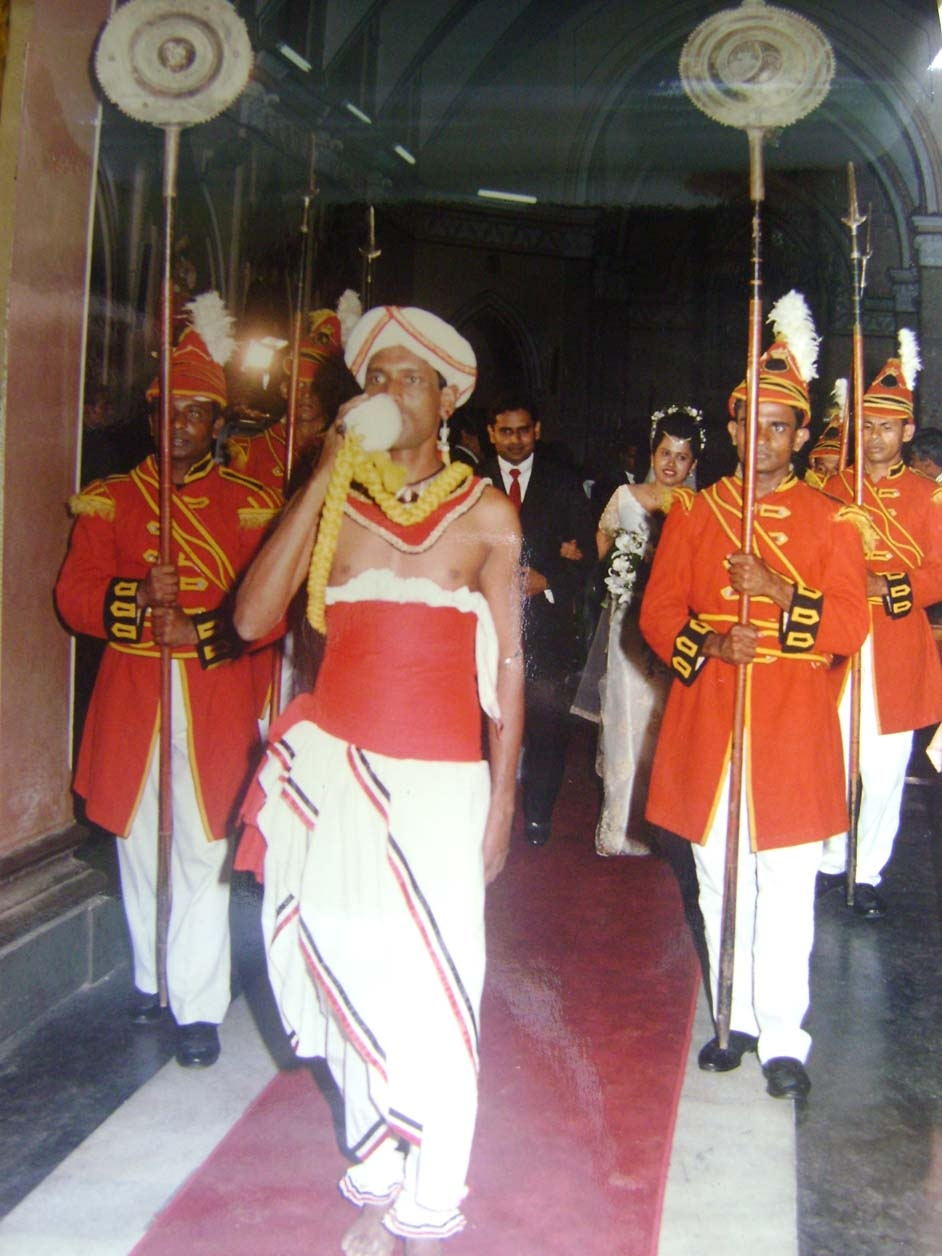
A flutist form the Lascarins.

Sri Lankan military bands come in various forms, with the following being the most common forms they come in:

- Marching band
- Concert band
- Beat Group
- String ensembles
- Pipe Band
- Oriental Orchestra

The Lascarins, which was the indigenous guard composed of soldiers who fought for Portuguese Ceylon, also served the British government during the colonial era. It maintained a marching tom-tom band that consists of flutes and seashell horns piping military music. Today a special ensemble, which reports to the Sri Lanka Navy, wears the uniforms worn by these guardsmen.

== Tri-service bands ==
In 2018, a combined contingent from the 3 main bands of the military (16 soldiers, 15 airman and 15 sailors) took part in the Spasskaya Tower Military Music Festival and Tattoo in Moscow, Russia at the invitation of the Military Band Service of the Armed Forces of Russia. It was recognized as the fourth best foreign band in the festival that year. At the end of their performance, a lone member notably sung Katyusha, a famed Russian patriotic song. The band was also invited to perform at several major railway stations around Moscow, including the Moscow Yaroslavsky railway station. The band was under the direction of contingent Commander Colonel Samson Jayakody, and Music Director Captain Chandana Amerasinghe, as well as Commander Shantha Rupasinghe and Major Sarath Edirisinghe.

=== Sri Lanka Army Band ===
The Sri Lanka Army Band is the official representative military band of the Sri Lanka Army. It is currently based in Panagoda, which is 20 km away from Colombo. The band was formed on 22 June 1950 with British Army Lieutenant George Perry, leading the platoon-sized band. Between 1952 and 1955, local Sri Lankan musicians were incorporated into the band, including Lieutenant C.T Caldera and Lional Edirisinghe who were among Sri Lanka's foremost musicians. Sergeant Wickramasinghe D. was the first native bandmaster of the army band. The band currently serves under the command of the Sri Lanka Army General Service Corps.

=== Sri Lanka Navy Band ===
The Sri Lanka Navy Band is the official representative military band of the Sri Lanka Navy. The band was founded in 1950 as part of the Royal Ceylon Navy. Originally, bandsmen were trained by instructors from the Royal Marine School of Music in Portsmouth. It was led at first by J. H. Reynolds, who presided over the training of the buglers, drummers and bagpipers. It primarily performs at different ceremony such as the farewell of foreign and domestic ships, including those from Australia, China and the United States.

=== Sri Lanka Air Force Band ===
The Sri Lanka Air Force Band is the official representative military band of the Sri Lanka Air Force. The first Air Force military band in the country was founded in 1970 under the Royal Ceylon Air Force (RCyAF). The first Bandmaster of the band was Chief Petty Officer, M.P.H Bartholomeusz. It consists of 24 musicians and is based in Katunayake, where it is attached to the Sri Lanka Air Force Regiment.

== Unit Bands ==
The formation of bands at regimental level first occurred in 1989 when the Central Army Band could not meet the Ceremonial demands of the entire service. They first received training at the Infantry Training Centre in Minneriya and were divided among the following regiments with each band formed up of a minimum of 17 musicians, a drum major and the bandmaster. The Bands are as follows:

- Sri Lanka Artillery Band
- Sri Lanka Signals Corps Band
- Band of the Sri Lanka Armoured Corps
- Band and Bugles of the Sri Lanka Light Infantry
- Band and Bugles of the Sri Lanka Sinha Regiment
- Band and Pipes and Drums of the Gemunu Watch
- Band of the Gajaba Regiment
- Band of the Vijayabahu Infantry Regiment
- Band of the Mechanized Infantry Regiment
- Band of the Sri Lanka Army Commandos
- Band of the Sri Lanka Army Special Forces
- Band of the Sri Lanka Engineers
- Band of the Sri Lanka Corps of Military Police
- Band of the Sri Lanka Army Medical Corps
- Band of the Sri Lanka Army Ordnance Corps
- Band of the Sri Lanka Army Women's Corps
- Band and Bugles of the Sri Lanka Rifle Corps
- Band of the Sri Lanka Air Force Regiment
- Central Band of the Sri Lanka National Guard
- Western Cadet Bands, National Cadet Corps
- Eastern Cadet Bands, National Cadet Corps
- Traditional Corps of Drums of Sri Lanka Army Headquarters

=== Sri Lanka Artillery Band ===
The Sri Lanka Artillery Band is the official representative military band of the Sri Lanka Artillery. It is the only band in the armed forces to use bearskin hats.

=== National Cadet Corps Bands ===
Bands in the National Cadet Corps are divided between a western and eastern band. Two training courses, one for platoon commanders and one for NCOs are available for cadet musicians. A standard cadet school band consists of 25 cadet musicians as well as a Sergeant, three Corporals and three Lance Corporals. The All Island Western Band Competition Camp at the Rantambe Cadet Training Center is organized annually by the NCC. Shavendra Silva, the current Acting Chief of Defence Staff as well as Commander of the Sri Lankan Army, was a notable alumni of the Bands of the NCC.

== See also ==
- Indian military bands
- Royal Marines Band Service
- Royal Corps of Army Music
- Royal Air Force Music Services
- United States military bands
- Russian military bands
