= General Fernando =

General Fernando may refer to:

- C. H. Fernando (1930–2020), Sri Lanka Army major general
- Dampath Fernando (fl. 1980s–2010s), Sri Lanka Army major general
- Percy Fernando (died 2000), Sri Lanka Army brigadier general (posthumously promoted to major general)
- Priyanka Fernando (fl. 2000s–2020s), Sri Lanka Army major general
- Rasika Fernando (fl. 1980s–2020s), Sri Lanka Army major general
