= Piyal Abeysekera =

Sri Lankan senior army general

Major General Piyal Abeysekera; USP
- Born: Colombo
- Military career
- Allegiance: Sri Lanka
- Branch: Sri Lanka Army
- Service years: 1980 – 2014 (34 years)
- Rank: Major General
- Commands: Sri Lanka Signals Corps
- Conflicts: Sri Lankan Civil War
- Awards: USP

Major General Piyal Abeysekera, USP (also known as E P De Z Abeysekera) was a Sri Lankan army general and the former Deputy Chief of Staff of Sri Lanka Army.

== Early life and education ==
Piyal received his education from Nalanda College Colombo. He holds a MSc from General Sir John Kotelawala Defence University in Military Science.

== Military career ==
Abeysekera joined Sri Lanka Army as an officer cadet in 1980 and was commissioned as a Second Lieutenant in the Regular Force. Piyal has held key appointments such as Master-General of ordinance branch, Colonel commandant of Sri Lanka Signals Corps, Commander Sri Lanka Light Infantry, Chief Signal Officer, Adjutant General, Director Operations at Secretariat for Coordinating the Peace Process (SCOPP).
