= Sri Lanka Army Order of Precedence =

For the purposes of parading, the regular army & the volunteer force of the Sri Lanka Army is listed according to an order of precedence.

- Sri Lanka Armoured Corps
- Sri Lanka Artillery
- Sri Lanka Engineers
- Sri Lanka Signals Corps
- Sri Lanka Light Infantry
- Sri Lanka Sinha Regiment
- Gemunu Watch
- Gajaba Regiment
- Vijayabahu Infantry Regiment
- Mechanized Infantry Regiment
- Commando Regiment
- Special Forces Regiment
- Military Intelligence Corps
- Engineer Services Regiment
- Sri Lanka Army Service Corps
- Sri Lanka Army Medical Corps
- Sri Lanka Army Ordnance Corps
- Sri Lanka Electrical and Mechanical Engineers
- Sri Lanka Corps of Military Police
- Sri Lanka Army General Service Corps
- Sri Lanka Army Women's Corps
- Sri Lanka Army Corps of Agriculture and Livestock
- Sri Lanka Rifle Corps
- Sri Lanka Army Pioneer Corps
- Sri Lanka National Guard
