= W. I. M. Seneviratne =

Sri Lankan soldier

Lance Corporal W. I. M. Seneviratne † PWV
- Born: 1968; Kobeigane, Kurunegala
- Died: July 4, 1996 (aged 27–28); Jaffna
- Military career
- Allegiance: Sri Lanka
- Branch: Sri Lanka Army
- Service years: 1987-1996
- Rank: Lance Corporal
- Service number: (S/15296)
- Units: 7th Battalion, Sri Lanka Light Infantry
- Conflicts: Sri Lankan Civil War
- Awards: Parama Weera Vibhushanaya

Lance Corporal W.I.M Seneviratne PWV, SLLI (c. 1968 – July 4, 1996) was a Sri Lankan soldier. After joining the Sri Lanka Army in 1987, Seneviratne served during the Sri Lankan Civil War. On July 4, 1996, while providing security to visiting Minister Nimal Siripala de Silva in the northern city of Jaffna, Seneviratne sacrificed his life to thwart a Tamil Tiger suicide bomber from assassinating Minister de Silva. He was posthumously awarded the Parama Weera Vibhushanaya, the highest military decoration awarded for gallantry in Sri Lanka.

== Background ==
W.I.M Seneviratne was born to a family of paddy farmers in Kobeigane, Kurunegala. Seneviratne studied up to his Ordinary Levels at Parakrama Maha Vidyalaya in Kobeigana. Having wanted to join the Sri Lanka Army since childhood, Seneviratne enlisted in the Army in 1987, joining the 7th Battalion of the Sri Lanka Light Infantry. After receiving training at the Army Training School in Maduru Oya, Seneviratne served in Trincomalee, Ampara and Jaffna during the course of the Sri Lankan Civil War. He was injured three times, twice at Elephant Pass and once at Palaly.

After being under the control of the militant Liberation Tigers of Tamil Eelam (Tamil Tigers) organization since the late 1980s, Jaffna, the largest city in the north of Sri Lanka was liberated by the Sri Lanka Army in 1995. Seneviratne was assigned to the 51st Division as a member of the Army Quick Reaction Team (QRT) in Jaffna, which consisted of motorbike-mounted troops.

== Suicide attack ==
On July 4, 1996, Seneviratne was assigned to provide protection to the Minister of Housing and Public Utilities, Nimal Siripala de Silva. The Chairman of the Presidential Task Force on Northern Rehabilitation, de Silva was visiting Jaffna to supervise on-going reconstruction projects. Arriving in Jaffna at 9am, the minister participated in a discussion related to the reconstruction of Jaffna, followed by free book distribution ceremony at the Holy Family Convent, Jaffna. He then proceeded to a new Building Materials Corporation (BMC) outlet on Stanley Road, one of a string of such outlets in the north.

After the ceremonial opening of the outlet, de Silva proceeded towards his Mitsubishi Pajero vehicle belonging to the Sri Lanka Army Medical Corps to continue onto a meeting with officers in charge of rehabilitation work at the Jaffna Kachcheri. His vehicle was to be driven by the Commander of the Sri Lanka Army 512 Brigade and Brigade Commander for Jaffna, Brigadier Ananda Hamangoda. De Silva was to sit in the passenger seat alongside Brigadier Hamangoda, while Ranjit Godamuduna, chairman of Lanka Cement Ltd, and a body guard were to sit in the back.

As de Silva was boarding the vehicle around 12:45pm, a seemingly pregnant woman dressed in a white blouse with two bags in her hand moved forward from the crown and approached the entourage. Lance Corporal W.I.M Seneviratne was astride his bike around 20 meters behind de Silva’s vehicle, along with another QRT soldier, Private Pushpakumara. Suspecting the woman was a suicide bomber, Seneviratne immediately maneuvered his bike to block her path. With nowhere to go, the woman detonated the explosives strapped onto her body, killing herself and Seneviratne instantly.

== Aftermath ==
23 people were killed in the blast, and 59 were wounded. Among the dead were Brigadier Ananda Hamangoda, de Silva’s security office Police Constable Banda and the chairman of Lanka Cement Ranjit Godamuduna, all of whom were inside the same vehicle as the Minister. An experienced planter and a director of a Colombo brokering firm, Godamuduna was spearheading a program to re-commission the Kankesanthurai cement factory, and was in Jaffna setting the stage for the arrival of a group of foreign engineers. Carlyle Dias, a retired Senior Superintendent of Police who came out of retirement to serve as the Civil Affairs Officer (CAO) in Jaffna, and BMC official Mr. A.A. Dissanayake were also among 11 civilians killed in the blast.

Minister de Silva suffered injuries to his forehead, and was taken to the Palaly military hospital for emergency treatment. He recovered from his injuries, and is currently Minister of Irrigation and Water Management in the government of Sri Lanka. Describing the suicide attack, Sunday Times columnist Iqbal Athas wrote

The message was quite clear. The LTTE would use the techniques it acquired to become one of the world's deadliest guerrilla outfits against its own people, the people whom it vowed to protect in the so-called state of Eelam it pledged to create.

For sacrificing his life to save Minister de Silva, Lance Corporal Seneviratne was recommended for the Parama Weera Vibhushanaya by his commanding officer, Lt. Col. K.A.D.A. Karunasekera. The Parama Weera Vibhushanaya is the highest award for gallantry presented by the Sri Lanka Army. On October 10, 1998, the medal was presented to Seneviratne’s mother by Sri Lankan President Chandrika Kumaratunga.

== See also ==
- Terrorism
- List of attacks attributed to the LTTE
- Eelam War IV
- Chaminda Ruwan Yakandawala
