= Plume (feather) =

Feather, as used on headgear

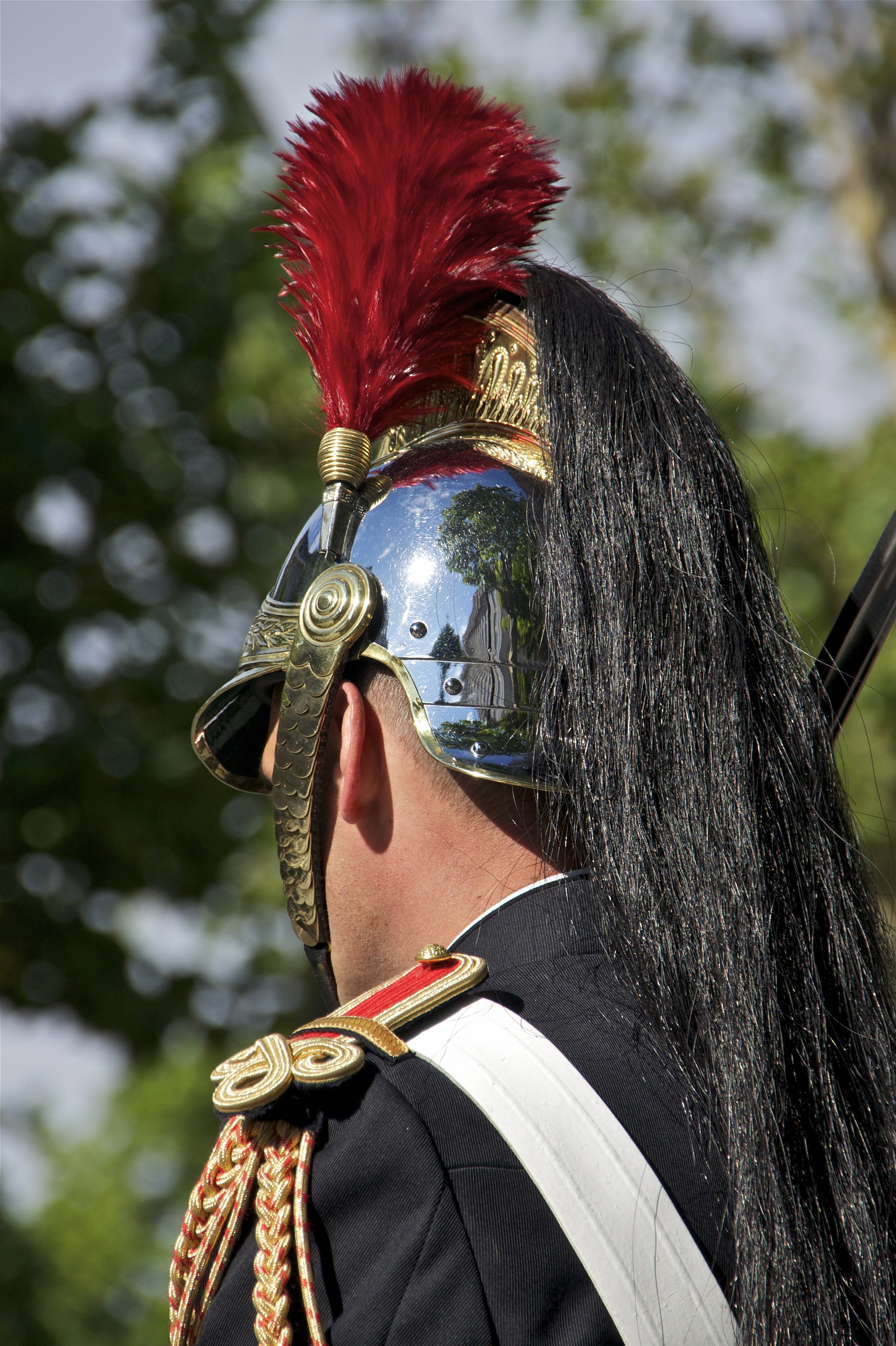
A plumed helmet

A plume is a special type of bird feather, possessed by egrets, ostriches, birds of paradise, quetzals, pheasants, peacocks and quails. They often have a decorative or ornamental purpose, commonly used among marching bands and the military, worn on the hat or helmet of the wearer. Famously by the blues & royals and the Life Guards. When used on military headdresses, the clipped feather plume is referred to as the hackle.

== History ==
The white heron or grande aigrette (Casmerodius albus) was historically highly sought after by plume hunters.

== In nature ==
Brightly coloured plumes are used by American coot chicks to entice their parents to feed them more food. It is a form of chick ornament.
