= C. T. Caldera =

Sri Lankan military officer

- Military career
- Allegiance: Sri Lanka
- Branch: Sri Lanka Army
- Service years: 1944–1946; 1949–1977
- Rank: Brigadier
- Units: Ceylon Light Infantry; Ceylon Signal Corps
- Commands: Chief of Staff, Sri Lanka Army; Ceylon Signal Corps; Ceylon Army Pioneer Corps
- Conflicts: World War II; First JVP Insurrection

Brigadier Cecil Theodore Caldera was a senior Sri Lanka Army officer, who served as the Chief of Staff of the Army.

Jayaweera joined the Ceylon Defence Force during World War II and received a war time commissioned into the Ceylon Light Infantry with its expansion in 1944 and served till he was demobilized in 1946 at the end of the war. With the formation of the Ceylon Army, Jayaweera transferred to a regular commission as a lieutenant in the 1st Battalion, Ceylon Infantry Regiment. In 1955, Lieutenant Caldera and Lionel Edirisinghe established the Hewisi Band under the instructions of the Acting Commander of the Army Colonel H. W. G. Wijeyekoon. Major Caldera was appointed second commanding officer of the 1st Regiment, Ceylon Signal Corps in October 1962, serving till June 1965. He then served as the commanding officer of the Ceylon Army Pioneer Corps from June 1966 to April 1968. He returned as the commanding officer of the 1st Regiment, Ceylon Signal Corps from July 1970 to October 1972, during the 1971 Insurrection. He served as Chief of Staff of the Army May 1976 to April 1977.

For wartime service in World War II, he had earned the Defence Medal (United Kingdom) and the War Medal 1939–1945, and for service in the Ceylon Army, he received the Ceylon Armed Services Long Service Medal, Queen Elizabeth II Coronation Medal, Sri Lanka Army 25th Anniversary Medal, Republic of Sri Lanka Armed Services Medal and the Ceylon Armed Services Inauguration Medal.
