= Channa Weerasuriya =

Sri Lankan General

Major General Channa Weerasuriya චන්න වීරසූරිය
- Born: 15 July 1968 (age 58); Colombo, Sri Lanka
- Education: University of Sri Jayawardenepura National Defence University, Pakistan
- Military career
- Allegiance: Sri Lanka
- Branch: Sri Lanka Army
- Service years: 1986–Present
- Rank: Major General
- Service number: O/60877
- Unit: Sri Lanka Light Infantry
- Conflicts: Sri Lankan Civil War

Major General Channa Weerasuriya RWP, RSP, ndu was a Sri Lankan army general. He was the Chief of Staff of the Army. Earlier, he served as Deputy Chief of Staff of Sri Lanka Army (DCOS). Prior to join DCOS, he served as the Commandant of Sri Lanka Army Volunteer Force and before this appointment he had served as Commander, Security Forces - East and General Officer Commanding(GOC), 22 Infantry Division.

== Early life and education ==
After completed Higher Secondary education at Mahanama College, Colombo he joined Sri Lanka Army as an officer cadet on 27 October 1986 to the Intake 26 and was commissioned as a Second Lieutenant into the 1st Battalion of the Sri Lanka Light Infantry on 23 July 1987.

== Military career ==
Being the officer of Sri Lanka infantry he successfully commanded 4th Battalion of Sri Lanka Light Infantry Regiment which was always on front line combat during Sri Lankan civil war. He was the Commander of 512, 523 and 663 Infantry Brigades, Commander of Air Mobile Brigade and Commander of 22 Division in Trincomalee. Weerasuriya is also the Colonel of the Regiment of Sri Lanka Light Infantry.

== Family ==
General Weerasuriya happily married to Mrs. Danusha Weerasuriya and blessed with a daughter.
