= Rasika Fernando =

Sri Lankan army general

Rasika Fernando RSP, ndc
- Military career
- Branch: Sri Lanka Army
- Service years: 1985–2020
- Rank: Major General
- Unit: Gajaba Regiment
- Commands: Security Forces Headquarters – East; Sri Lanka National Guard
- Conflicts: Sri Lankan Civil War
- Awards: Rana Sura Padakkama

Major General Rasika Fernando, RSP, ndc was a Sri Lankan army general. He was the Deputy Chief of Staff of Sri Lankan Army, having served as the, Commander, Security Forces Headquarters – East. He is the Colonel Commandant of the Sri Lanka National Guard.

== Military career ==
Major General Rasika Fernando enlisted on 6 June 1985 to the Sri Lanka Army, enrolling in the Sri Lanka Military Academy. He was first commissioned as a Second Lieutenant in the Gajaba Regiment. He was the 221 Brigade Commander, Brigadier General Staff (SFHQ-South), Brigadier General Staff (SFHQ-West), Brigadier General Staff (SFHQ-East), Director Infantry of Army Headquarters, General Officer Commanding, 68 Division, Director General General Staff of the OCDS, and the Commander, Security Forces - East. He subsequently was appointed Deputy Chief of Staff and is also the Colonel of the Regiment of the Sri Lanka National Guard.
