= Panagoda Cantonment =

Coordinates: 6°52′11″N 80°02′09″E

- Panagoda, Western Province

Site information
- Type: Cantonment
- Controlled by: Sri Lanka Army

Site history
- Built: 1952 - 1959
- Architect: Tom Neville Wynne-Jones
- In use: 1953 – present

Garrison information
- Garrison: Sri Lanka Artillery, Sri Lanka Signals Corps, Sri Lanka Light Infantry

Panagoda Cantonment is a cantonment located in the Western Province of Sri Lanka. It serves as the regimental headquarters of many regiments of the Sri Lanka Army and is an arsenal. It also houses one of the main Military Hospitals operated by the Sri Lanka Army Medical Corps. It is one of the largest military bases in Sri Lanka.

== History ==
Sir Kanthiah Vaithianathan, the first Permanent Secretary to the Ministry of External Affairs and Defence took the decision to establish a cantonment in Panagoda in 1949 with the formation of the Ceylon Army that year. In 1950, 350 acres of land was purchased by the government and construction began on 10 October 1952 and was completed in 1959. Prime Minister Wijeyananda Dahanayake ceremonially opened the main building on 22 December 1959. Since then it had functioned as a Brigade, the Western Command, the Support Force Command and was re-designated as the headquarters of the 1 Division. On 15 July 1997, it was re-designated headquarters of the 11 Division. On 23 September 2009, the Security Forces Headquarters – South was formed at the Panagoda Cantonment. On 15 November 2012 Security Forces Headquarters – South was renamed as the Security Forces Headquarters – West.

== List of regiment which has its regimental headquarters at the Panagoda Cantonment ==
- Sri Lanka Light Infantry
- Sri Lanka Artillery
- Sri Lanka Engineers
- Sri Lanka Signals Corps
- Engineer Services Regiment
- Sri Lanka Army Service Corps
- Sri Lanka Army Ordnance Corps
- Sri Lanka Army Medical Corps
- Sri Lanka Army General Service Corps
