= Sri Lanka Army Service Corps =

- Active: 30 October 1949 - Present
- Country: Sri Lanka
- Branch: Sri Lanka Army
- Type: Supply Regiment
- Role: Military supply chain management
- Size: 7 Reg & 1 Vol units
- Regimental Centre: Panagoda
- Nickname: Waggoneers
- Colors
- Anniversaries: 30 October (Regimental day)
- Engagements: 1971 Insurrection; Insurrection 1987-89; Sri Lankan Civil War
- Website: https://alt.army.lk/slasc/

Commanders
- Colonel Commandant: Maj Gen KTP de Silva RSP ndu psc
- Centre Commandant: Brigadier DPK Gamage RSP USP psc ptsc
- Regimental Sergeant Major: WO I BMRS Wijerathne USP

Insignia
- Flag

The Sri Lanka Army Service Corps (SLASC) is a Combat Support corps of the Sri Lanka Army. The role of the corps is to carry supplies to the soldier where he is, and run an efficient organization for the provision of transport, fuel, oil and lubricants which are the 'life blood of an army'. It is made up of 7 regular units and one volunteer (reserve) units and is headquartered at its Regiment Center at the Panagoda Cantonment, Panagoda. The corps has a trade school in Anuradhapura which trains drivers, cooks and clerks for the Army.

== Units ==
- 1st Regiment Sri Lanka Army Service Corps
- 3rd Regiment Sri Lanka Army Service Corps
- 4th Regiment Sri Lanka Army Service Corps
- 5th Regiment Sri Lanka Army Service Corps
- 6th Regiment Sri Lanka Army Service Corps
- 7th Regiment Sri Lanka Army Service Corps
- 8th Regiment Sri Lanka Army Service Corps

=== Volunteers ===
- 2nd Volunteer Regiment Sri Lanka Army Service Corps (Formed on 12 April 2018)
- 9th Volunteer Regiment Sri Lanka Army Service Corps (Formed on 20 March 2018)

== Notable members ==
- Chinthaka De Soyza
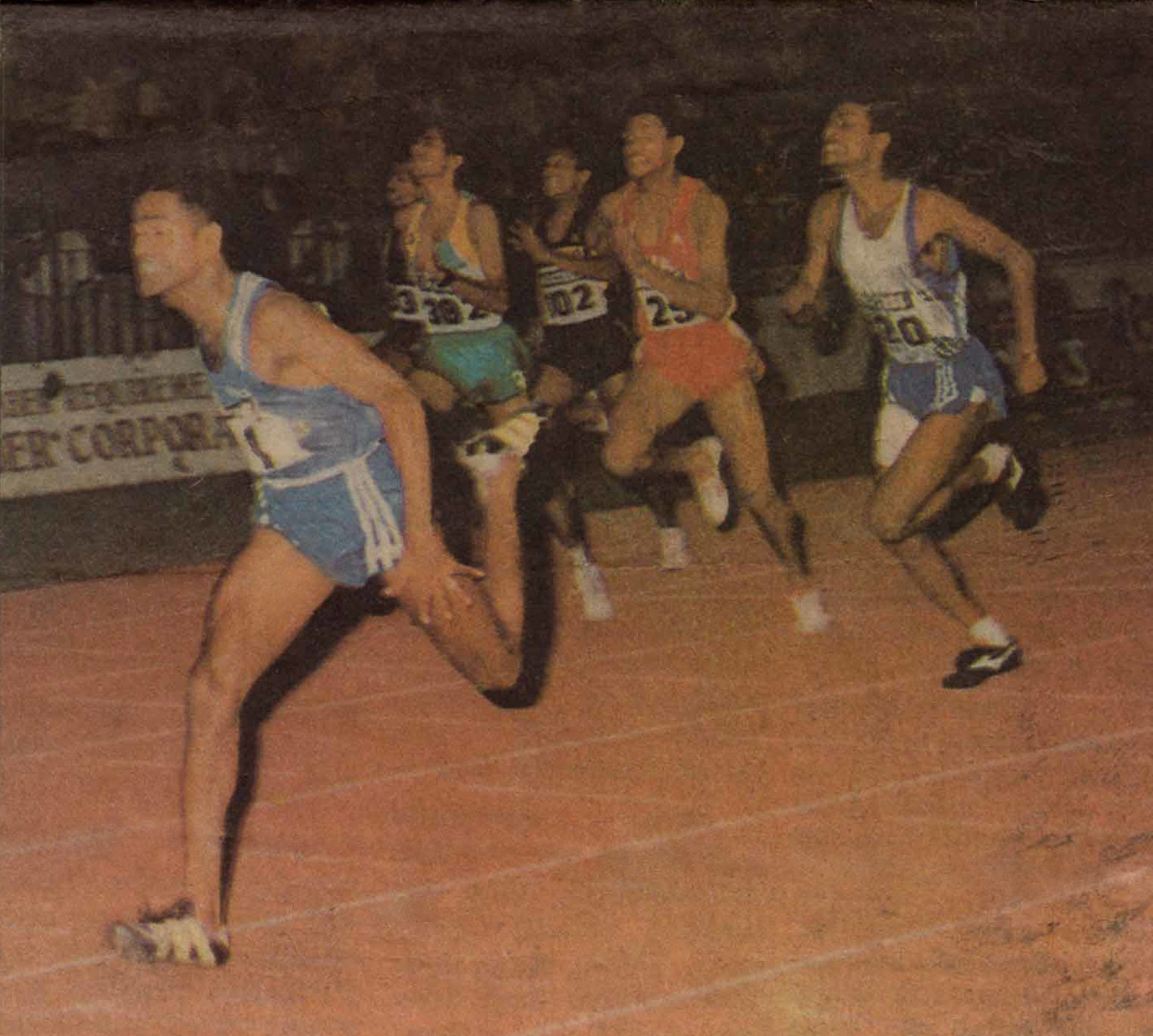
Chintaka De Soyza in 100m

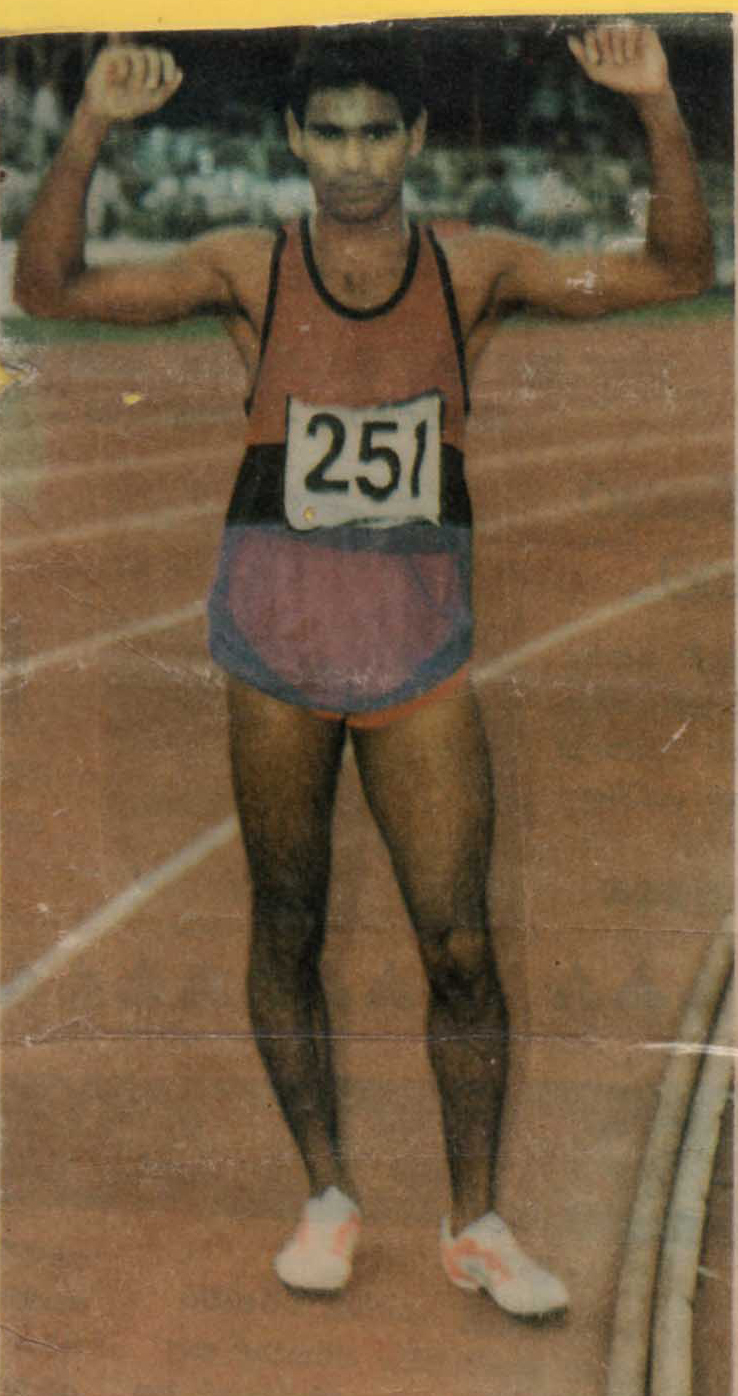
Chintaka De Soyza in 100m

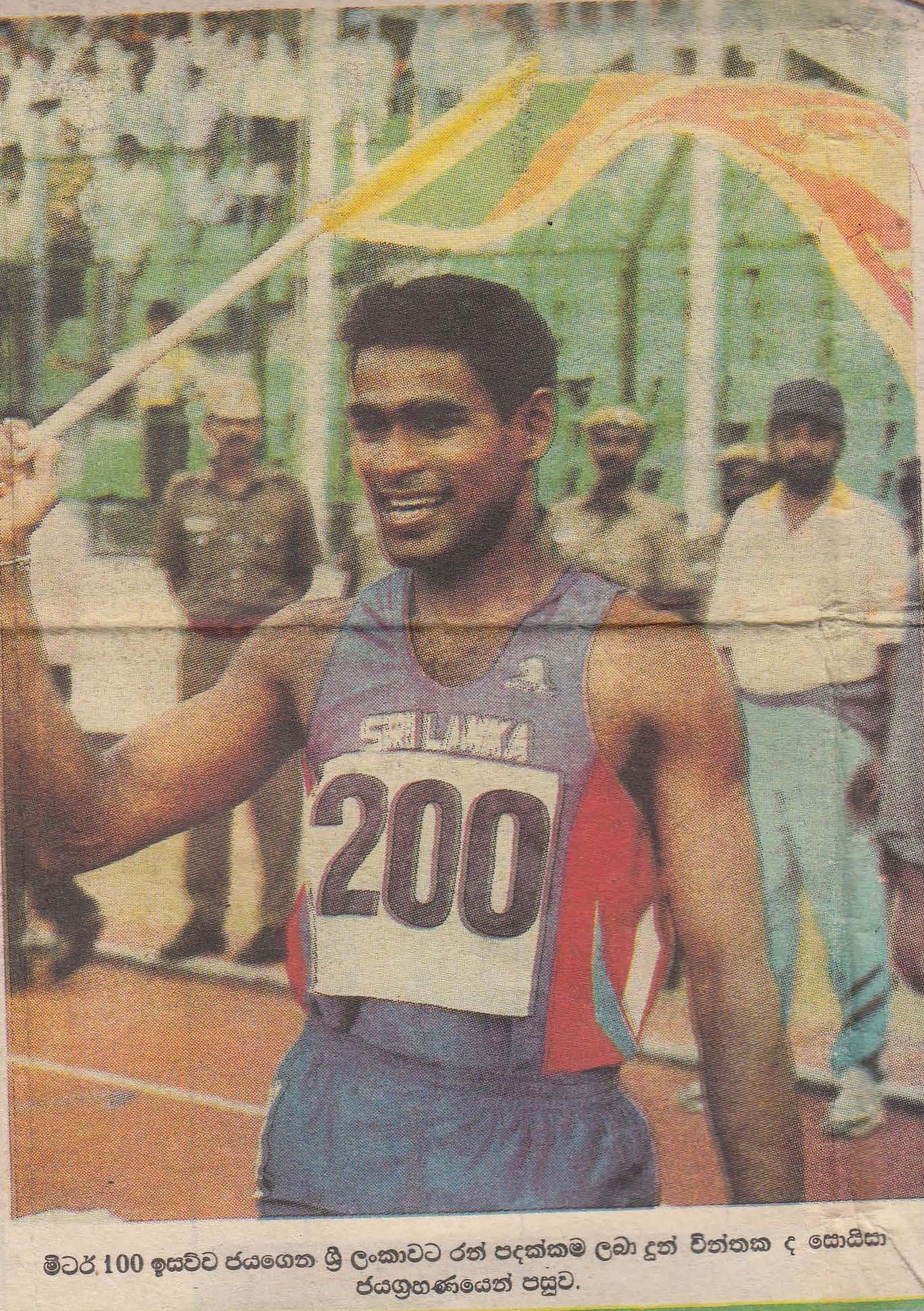
Chintaka De Soyza in 100m

== Alliances ==
- United Kingdom - Royal Army Service Corps

== Order of precedence ==
Preceded by Engineer Services Regiment	Order of Precedence	Succeeded by Sri Lanka Army Medical Corps

== See also ==
- Sri Lanka Army

== External links and sources ==
- Sri Lanka Army
- Sri Lanka Army Service Corps
- Sri Lanka Army Service Corps: The Hundred Year Journey Blog
