= Engineer Services Regiment =

Corps of Engineer Services
- Active: January 1950 - Present
- Country: Sri Lanka
- Branch: Sri Lanka Army
- Role: Civil Engineering
- Size: 7 Regular Units & 9 Volunteer Units
- Regimental Centre: Panagoda
- Colors
- Engagements: 1971 Insurrection; Insurrection 1987-89; Sri Lankan Civil War
- Website: https://alt.army.lk/ces/

Commanders
- Colonel of the Regiment: Maj Gen A H L G Amarapala RWP RSP ndc psc
- Centre Commandant: Brig K L Munasinghe USP
- Regimental Sergeant Major: WO1 W W M I B Aberathna

The Corps of Engineer Services (CES) a regiment of the Sri Lanka Army. The role of the Corps of Engineer Services is to design, construct and maintain all buildings, roads and associated facilities such as electricity, water supply and drainage systems used by the Sri Lanka Army, Apart from this, the Regiment is also responsible for the installation, maintenance and repair of all types of generators, water pumps, sewer pumps, desalination plants and other electrical appliances. It is made up of 6 regular units and 9 volunteer (reserve) units and is headquartered at its Regiment Center at the Panagoda Cantonment, Panagoda.

== History ==
The role of the early Works Section was to maintain Army buildings and the Panagoda Cantonment when it was completed. The beginning was made in January 1950 when the first regular officer Capt M.L.D.A Perera was commissioned to fill the vacancy of the Garrison Engineer who was shortly due for additional training at the Royal School of Military Engineering. The Panagoda Cantonment was at this stage being planned by the Public Works Department and it became the first task of this officer to follow this work, and at the same time liaise with the civil government departments in all matters pertaining to the land and buildings required by the Army. Soon the Works Squadron undertook all maintenance services and minor additions to the building of the three services.

The Works Services of the Ceylon Engineers was formed as a unit in 1958 and Lt. Col M.L.D.A Perera was appointed the first Commanding Officer of the unit.

In 1991 the Works Services of the Ceylon Engineers separated from the Sri Lanka Engineers and was redesigned as the Engineer Services Regiment.

== Units ==
=== Regular Army ===
- 1st Engineer Service Regiment
- 2nd Engineer Service Regiment
- 3rd Engineer Service Regiment
- 5th Engineer Service Regiment
- 11th Engineer Service Regiment
- 16th Engineer Service Regiment

=== Volunteers ===
- 4th(v) Engineer Service Regiment (Formed on 21 August 1996)
- 6th(v) Engineer Service Regiment (Formed on 6 June 2006)
- 7th(v) Engineer Service Regiment (Formed on 17 July 2006)
- 8th(v) Engineer Service Regiment (Formed on 24 April 2006)
- 9th(v) Engineer Service Regiment (Formed on 1 November 2008)
- 10th(v) Engineer Service Regiment (Formed on 2 April 2009)
- 12th(v) Engineer Service Regiment (Formed on 10 October 2010)
- 14th(v) Engineer Service Regiment (Formed on 10 February 2010)
- 15th(v) Engineer Service Regiment (Formed on 19 August 2009)

=== Training Centers ===
- Engineer Service Trade School
- Engineer Service Central Workshop

== Order of precedence ==
Preceded by Military Intelligence Corps	Order of Precedence	Succeeded by Sri Lanka Army Service Corps

== See also ==
- Sri Lanka Army
