= National Service Regiment =

- Active: 1971 - 1977
- Country: Sri Lanka
- Branch: Sri Lanka Army
- Role: General Duties
- Size: 1 Unit
- Nickname: NSR
- Engagements: 1971 Insurrection

The National Service Regiment was a former general service regiment of the Ceylon Army which was formed during the 1971 JVP Insurrection to meet the additional requirements. It was subsequently disbanded in 1977 with its officers and men transferred to other units in the Sri Lanka Army Volunteer Force.
