= Sri Lanka Signals Corps =

- ශ්‍රී ලංකා සංඥා බලකාය
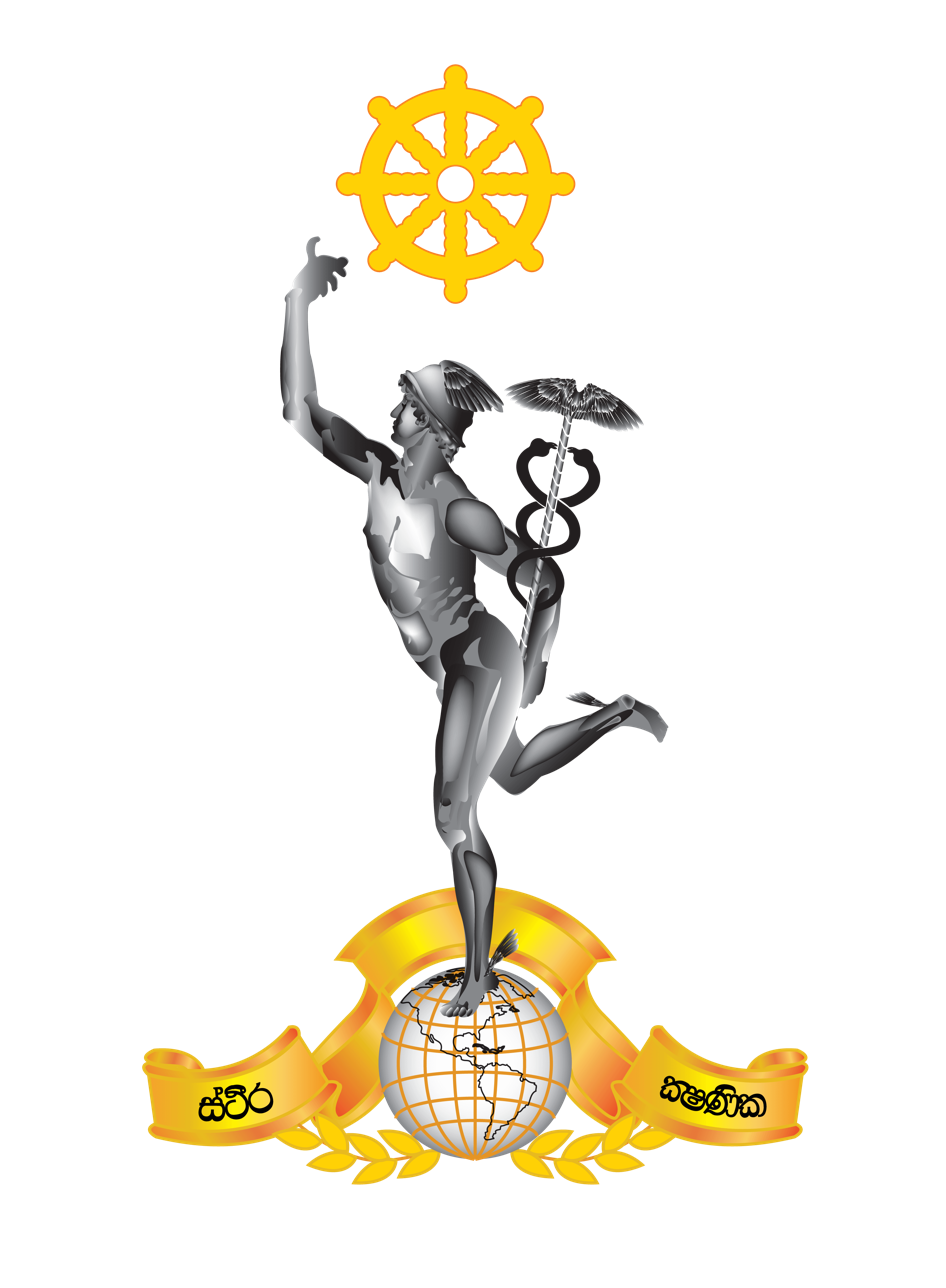
- Active: 19 October 1943 - Present
- Country: Sri Lanka
- Branch: Sri Lanka Army
- Type: Signal corps
- Role: Military communications Electronic warfare Information technology support Cyberwarfare
- Size: 2 signal brigades 10 regular regiments 1 volunteer regiment
- Regimental Headquarters: Panagoda Cantonment, Homagama
- Nickname: SLSC
- Mottos: ස්ථීර ක්‍ෂණික Sthira Kshanika (Sinhala: Swift and Sure)
- Colors
- March: Begone Dull Care
- Anniversaries: 19 October
- Engagements: Sri Lankan Civil War; United Nations Stabilisation Mission in Haiti; Insurrection 1987-89; 1971 Insurrection; World War II
- Website: alt.army.lk/signaller/

Commanders
- Chief Signal Officer: Major General K M G Bandaranayake USP ndc psc
- Colonel Commandant: Major General K M G Bandaranayake USP ndc psc

Insignia
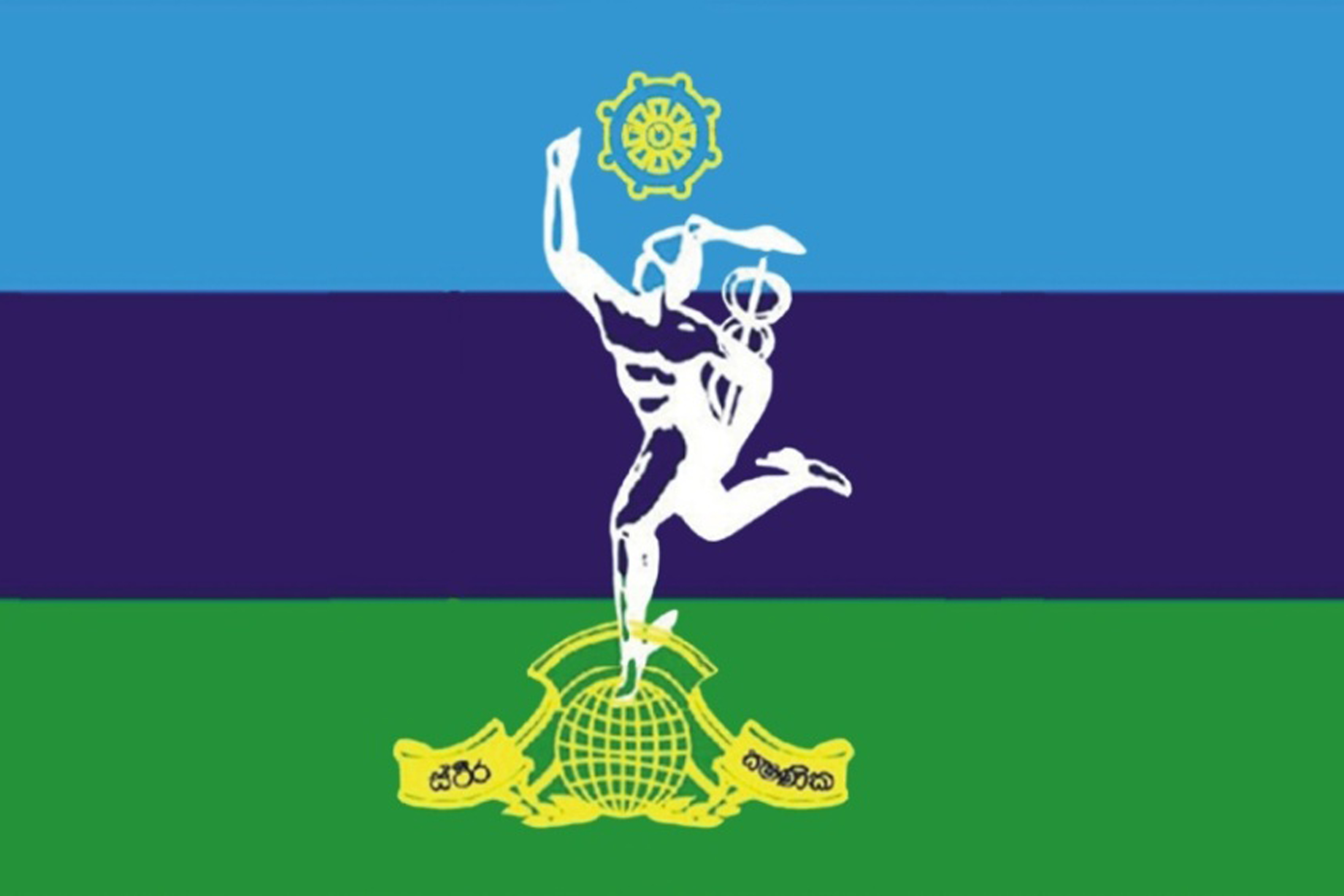
- Flag

The Sri Lanka Signals Corps (SLSC) (Sinhalese: ශ්‍රී ලංකා සංඥා බලකාය Shri Lanka Sana Balakaya) is a combat support corps of the Sri Lanka Army, responsible for providing military communications, information technology and electronic warfare support. The corps is made up of two signals brigades, ten regular regiments and one volunteer regiment. It is responsible for installing, maintaining and operating all types of telecommunications equipment and information systems. It is headquartered at the Panagoda Cantonment.

== Colonel Commandant Sri Lanka Signal Corps ==
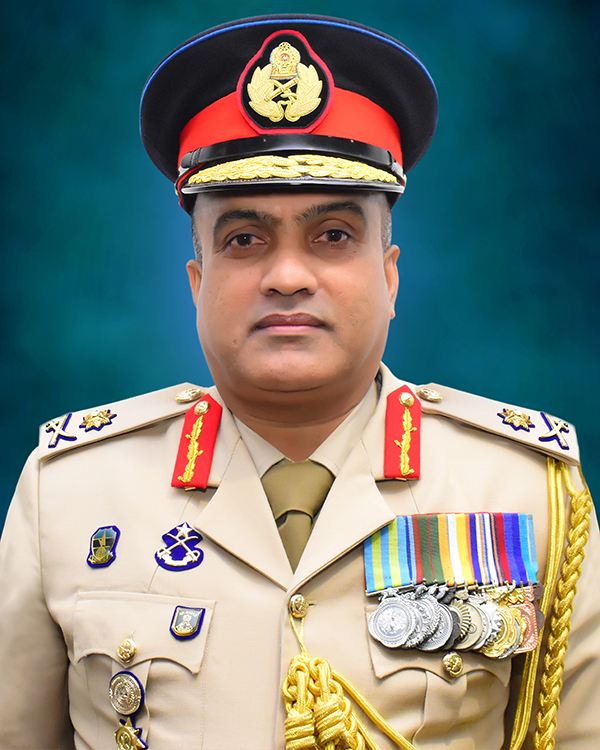
Major General K M G Bandaranayake USP ndc psc

== History ==
Established on October 19, 1943, as a part of the Ceylon Defence Force it was reformed as a troop of signals February 9, 1950 following the formation of the Ceylon Army in 1949. The initial task of this troop was to provide communications between Army HQ and its branches. In 1949, the Volunteer Signals unit was commanded by Lt Col CR De Silva. By the end of 1950 this troop had 1 Officer and 17 other ranks and their tasks included establishing a signals office at Army HQ, provision of a signal dispatch service, manning a switch board and the construction and maintenance of underground as well as field cables. In May 1951 another Signals Office was established in Diyatalawa to serve the Garrison HQ which was just formed at that time. By October 1, 1951, the troop was raised to a squadron with a strength of 4 officers and 142 other ranks.

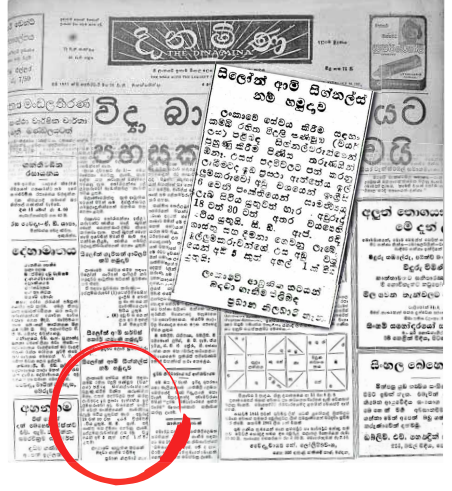

In 1951 formal approval was granted to wear the Royal Signals badges with the additional scroll "CEYLON" on it and to adopt the Royal Signals march Begone Dull Care as the regimental march of the Ceylon Signals Corps and in 1959 the 1st Regiment of the Ceylon Signals was formed with Lt Col DV Brohier was appointed as its first Commanding Officer.

In 1972 with Sri Lanka proclaiming itself a republic, the Corps was renamed as the Sri Lanka Signals Corps. In 1980 a new Volunteer squadron was raised. The Corps has expanded to a level of a Signals Brigade with integral signals units under HQ Chief Signal Officer at the highest level of command in performing the classic role. The Signals Corps provides support to the combat and support arms by providing communications, electronic warfare and information technology support in the battle field and at the rear. All these signal units and sub-units administratively come under the aegis of the Regimental Centre located at Panagoda Cantonment.

== Organization ==
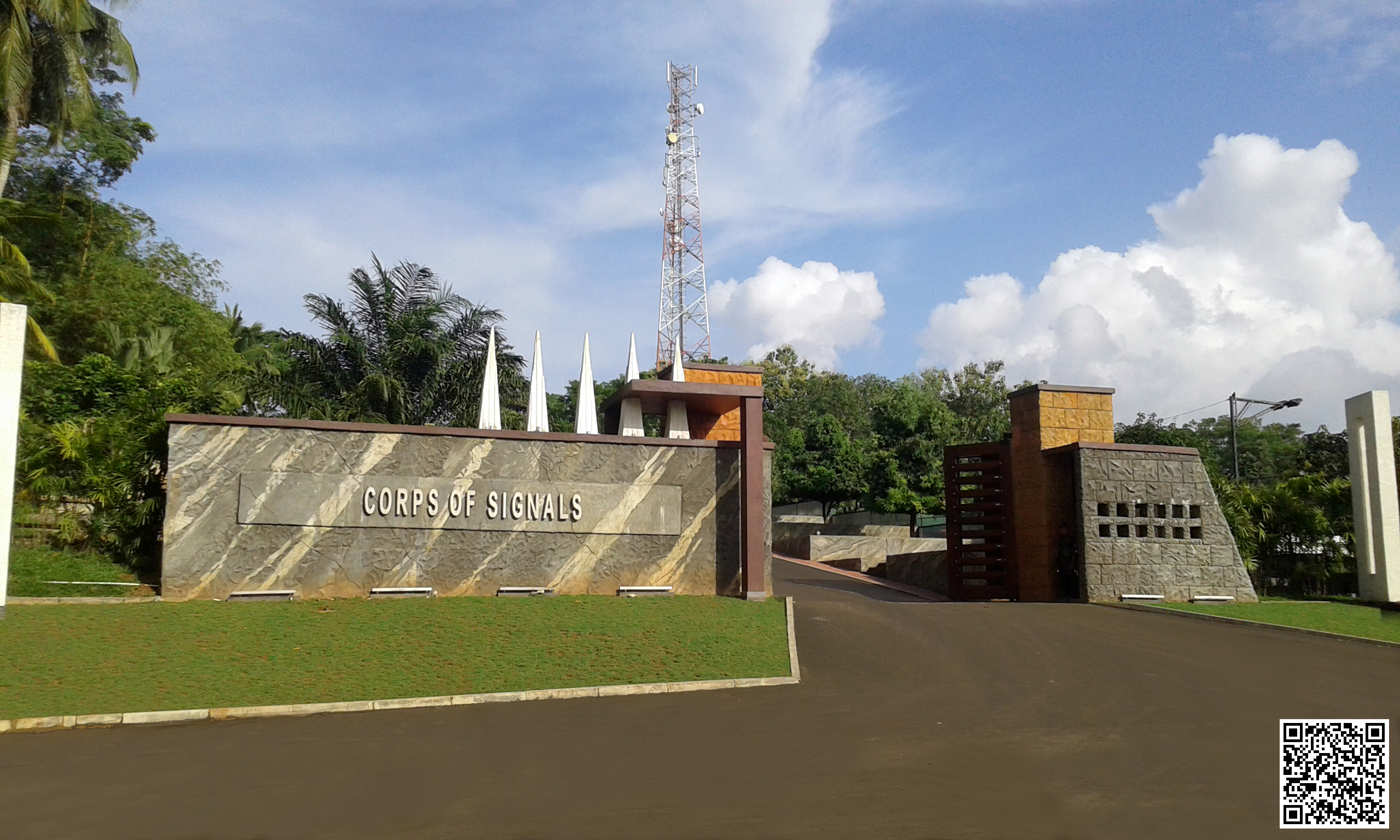
Corps Of Signals

Unit	Established	Head Of The Establishment	Base
HQ Chief Signal Officer	12 March 2007	Major General K M G Bandaranayake USP ndc psc	Army Headquarters, Akuregoda
Directorate of Information Technology	1 March 2010	Brigadier MR Hameem USP	Army Headquarters, Akuregoda
1 Signal Brigade	15 June 1988	Brigadier PPC Perera psc	Army Camp, Salawa, Kosgama.
2 Signal Brigade	4 December 2023	Brigadier TS Liyanagunawardana	Army Camp, Menerigama, Padukka.
Regimental Centre	19 October 1990	Brigadier PHN Chandrasekara	Army Cantonment, Panagoda
School of Signals	15 July 1991	Col DMS Dissanayake USP psc	Boowelikada, Kandy
1 SLSC	14 October 1958	Major J M D K Madhuchandra USP (Officiating)	Army Camp, Iranamadu, Kilinochchi
3 SLSC	9 March 1989	Lieutenant Colonel KMIP Hemapala USP psc	Army Camp, Vasavilan, Palaly
4 SLSC	5 June 1991	Lieutenant Colonel WHMJ Wijerathna USP psc	Army Camp, Ranasewapura, Anuradhapura
5 SLSC	1 March 1994	Maj TMND Thennakoon USP psc	Padukka
6 SLSC (IT)	3 December 1996 (RFT Unit)16 June 2014	Lieutenant Colonel H M G U I B Herath USP psc	Army Headquarters, Akuregoda
7 SLSC	23 August 2022	Major SJDS Samarawickrama USP psc (Offg)	Menikkanda, Diyatalawa
9 SLSC	15 July 2008	Lieutenant Colonel R M K U K Ratnayake USP	Army Camp, Vattappalai, Mullaitivu
10 SLSC (CT)	13 August 2000 (as the Signal Base workshop)24 April 2015	Lieutenant Colonel J Kumar psc ptsc	Army Cantonment, Panagoda
11 SLSC (IT)	23 August 1990 (as the Electronic Data Processing Unit)21 September 2010	Lieutenant Colonel MC Tukkawadu	Army Camp, Salawa, Kosgama
12 SLSC (CS)	25 January 2017	Lieutenant Colonel NWPGP Indrajith USP	Army Camp, Salawa, Kosgama
2 (V) SLSC	7 August 1980 (as the 1st (Volunteer) Squadron)13 April 1999	Lieutenant Colonel N P S M Sisira Kumara psc (Officiating)	Welikanda

== Past Regimental Commanders and Colonel Commandants ==
Name	From	To
Major General KMG Bandaranayake USP ndc psc	2025.12.16	Up to date
Major General GLSW Liyanage USP nps psc	2025.01.15	2025.11.25
Major General IHMRK Herath USP ndc psc	2024.01.04	2025.01.03
Major General KAWS Ratnayake ndu	2023.03.04	2024.12.31
Major General HMLD Herath RSP USP psc	2022.06.06	2023.03.02
Major General PAJ Peiris ndu	2021.01.15	2022.06.05
Major General DAPN Dematanpitiya ndu psc	2020.02.26	2021.01.14
Major General NM Hettiarachchi USP psc Hdmc MMS	2019.04.26	2020.02.24
Major General BHMA Wijesinghe USP ndu psc	2017.04.16	2019.04.26
Major General KRP Rowel RWP USP ndu psc	2015.15.07	2017.04.16
Major General RA Kaduwela	2014.05.07	2013.04.10
Major General SAPP Samarasinghe RSP psc	2014.05.07	2015.05.06
Major General EP de Z Abeysekera USP	2010.05.25	2014.05.07
Brigadier EP de Z Abeysekera USP	2009.07.16	2010.05.25
Brigadier TF Meedin RSP Ldmc MMS MIT	2008.01.16	2009.07.16
Major General YSA de Silva USP psc	2005.11.29	2008.01.16
Brigadier YSA de Silva USP psc	2004.08.19	2005.11.29
Maj General AMCWB Senevirathna USP ndc psc	2004.05.14	2004.08.19
Brigadier YSA de Silva USP psc	2003.12.22	2004.05.14
Maj General AMCWB Senevirathna USP ndc psc	2001.07.20	2003.12.22
Brigadier KJN Senaweera RSP USP Ldmc	2000.08.23	2001.07.20
Maj Gen AMCWB Senevirathna USP psc	1998.02.23	2000.08.23
Brigadier AMCWB Senevirathna psc	1997.01.20	1998.02.23
Brigadier HGN Padmasiri	1996.01.01	1997.04.30
Brigadier AMCWB Senevirathna psc	1993.12.01	1996.01.01
Colonel AMCWB Senevirathna psc	1993.10.22	1993.12.01
Brigadier KA Gnanaweera	1992.12.01	1993.10.22
Brigadier CJ Abeyrathne	1988.07.15	1992.12.01
Colonel CJ Abeyrathne	1988.04.25	1988 .07.15

== Notable officers ==
- Lieutenant Colonel DV Brohier - First Commanding Officer, Ceylon Signals Corps
- Brigadier C. T. Caldera - second Commanding Officer, Ceylon Signals Corps
- Lieutenant Colonel Basil R. Jesudasan - former Commanding Officer, 2nd Volunteer Signals, Ceylon Signals Corps & accused conspirator in the 1962 coup d'état attempt
- Major General Piyal Abeysekera (also known as E.P. de Z. Abeysekera) USP, MSc - former Deputy Chief of Staff of Sri Lanka ArmyMajor General W.J.T.K. Fernando psc - former CO, 1SLSC
- Major General C.J. Abayaratna VSV, USP - 1st Colonel Commandant, SLSC, former Signals Brigade Commander & former CO, 1SLSC
- Major General A.M.C.W.B. Senewiratne VSV, USP, psc - 4th Colonel Commandant, SLSC & former CO, 3 SLSC
- Major General Y.S.A. de Silva USP - 5th Colonel Commandant, SLSC, former Signals Brigade Commander & former CO 4 SLSC
- Major General Tuan Fadyl Meedin RSP, Ldmc - 6th Colonel Commandant, SLSC, 1st Chief Signals Officer (CSO), Chief Innovations Officer (CIO), Signals Brigade Commander, Chief Controller- Centre for Research & Development (MOD), Centre Commandant & former CO-1 SLSC
- Major General S A P P Samarasinghe RSP psc - 2nd Chief Signal Officer - Sri Lanka Army, 13th Colonel Commandant - SLSC
- Major General R A Kaduwela - 3rd Chief Signal Officer - Sri Lanka Army
- Major General K R P Rowel RWP USP ndu psc USACGSC - 4th Chief Signal Officer - Sri Lanka Army, 14th Colonel Commandant - SLSC
- Major General B H M A Wijesinghe USP ndu psc - 5th Chief Signal Officer - Sri Lanka Army, 15th Colonel Commandant - SLSC
- Major General N M Hettiarachchi USP psc Hdmc - 6th Chief Signal Officer - Sri Lanka Army, 16th Colonel Commandant - SLSC
- Major General D A P N Dematanpitiya ndu psc - 17th Colonel Commandant - SLSC
- Major General W P A K Thilakarathne psc - 7th Chief Signal Officer - Sri Lanka Army
- Major General P A J Peiris ndu - 8th Chief Signal Officer - Sri Lanka Army, 18th Colonel Commandant - SLSC
- Major General H M L D Herath RSP VSV USP psc - 9th Chief Signal Officer - Sri Lanka Army, 19th Colonel Commandant - SLSC
- Major General K.A.W.S. Ratnayake ndu - 10th Chief Signal Officer - Sri Lanka Army, 20th Colonel Commandant - SLSC
- Major General I H M R K Herath USP ndc psc - 11th Chief Signal Officer - Sri Lanka Army, 21st Colonel Commandant - SLSC
- Major General G L S W Liyanage USP nps psc - 12th Chief Signal Officer - Sri Lanka Army, 22nd Colonel Commandant - SLSC
- Major General K M G Bandaranayake USP ndc psc - 13th Chief Signal Officer - Sri Lanka Army, 23rd Colonel Commandant - SLSC

== Alliances ==
- United Kingdom - Royal Corps of Signals

== Order of precedence ==
Preceded by Sri Lanka Engineers	Order of Precedence	Succeeded by Sri Lanka Light Infantry

== Abbreviation ==
- CSO - Chief Signal Officer
- PWV- Parama Weera Vibhushanaya
- WV - Weerodara Vibhushanaya
- WWV - Weera Wickrama Vibhushanaya
- RWP - Rana Wickrama Padakkama
- RSP - Rana Sura Padakkama
- VSV - Vishista Sewa Vibhushanaya
- USP -Utthama Seva Padakkama
- psc - passed staff college
- ndu - national defense university
- IT - Information Technology
- CS - Cyber Security
- CT - Communication Technology
