= Sri Lanka Army Women's Corps =

- Cap badge
- Active: 1979–present
- Country: Sri Lanka
- Allegiance: Sri Lanka
- Branch: Sri Lanka Army
- Role: Combat service support
- Size: 4 battalions
- Regimental Headquarters: Borella, Colombo
- Motto: The Powerful Mind is the Strongest Weapon
- Engagements: Sri Lankan civil war
- Website: alt.army.lk/slawc

Commanders
- Colonel Commandant: Maj Gen HHKSS Hewage RWP RSP USP rcds psc
- Centre Commandant: Brig PGCS Gallage RWP RSP
- Notable commanders: Lt. Col. A.W. Thambiraja; Lt. Col. Kumudini Weerasekara

The Sri Lanka Army Women's Corps (SLAWC) is a combat service supoort corps of the Sri Lanka Army. The corps was raised in 1979. The regimental headquarters of this corps is at Borella, Colombo. Initially, members of this corps were employed in non-combat staff duties but later were employed in field duties.

It was the vision of former army commander General Denis Perera to create this corps in 1978.

== History ==
The corps was created by the help of the British Army's Women's Royal Army Corps (WRAC) and 3 women were sent to Britain for eight months long officer training who returned to Sri Lanka in August 1979 after completion of training and were taken into the Sri Lanka army's women's corps in November of the same year. Sri Lanka Army Women's Corps was officially formed as a regular army corps on 14 September 1979, on this day the first battalion was formed which was designated as 1 SLAWC.

WRAC instructors from Britain came to Sri Lanka in 1980 to train Sri Lankan females for Sri Lankan women's corps and 10 women were trained into the Army Training Centre, Diyatalawa for one month, and after passing out they were directly given the corporal rank. In 1981, 45 females were recruited and were given training of clerical works and exchange operators, this was the first batch of females who were in the rank private, the second batch of female privates was taken in the same year who were also given training on clerical duties and also signal duties.

The first batch of females commissioned from the Sri Lanka Military Academy passed out on 18 August 1984.

In 1984, the fifth batch of female privates was taken, and this batch was given light machine gun training, this was the first batch of the women's corps where weapon training was conducted. In 1987, 8 women were deployed into the Vadamarachchi Operation, this was the first combat operation where women's corps members participated.

On 14 May 1982 President of Sri Lanka J. R. Jayewardene with his wife visited the Sri Lanka Army Women's Corps Headquarters.

Lieutenant Colonel A.W. Thambiraja was the first commanding officer of the first battalion (1 SLAWC) who was appointed on 14 September 1979. The first female commanding officer of the first SLAWC battalion was Lieutenant Colonel Kumudini Weerasekara.

== Units ==
=== Regular battalions ===
- 1st Sri Lanka Army Women’s Corps
- 7th Sri Lanka Army Women's Corps

=== Volunteer battalions ===
- 2nd(v) Sri Lanka Army Women’s Corps
- 3rd(v) Sri Lanka Army Women’s Corps

== Notable members ==
- Susanthika Jayasinghe - Olympic silver medal winner at the 2000 Summer Olympics.
- Nadeeka Lakmali - Silver medalist at the Asian Championships and South Asian Games.
- Dilhani Lekamge - Silver medalist Asian Championships.
- Nadeesha Ramanayake - Gold medalist at the Asian Championships.

== Order of precedence ==
Preceded by Sri Lanka Army General Service Corps	Order of Precedence	Succeeded by Sri Lanka Rifle Corps
