= Sri Lanka Corps of Military Police =

- Crest of the SLCMP
- Active: 30 October 1949–present
- Country: Sri Lanka
- Branch: Sri Lanka Army
- Type: Military Police
- Role: Policing; Provost; Counter-intelligence
- Size: 8 units (156 officers, 3504 servicepersons)
- Regimental Centre: Polhengoda, Colombo 5
- Mottos: Exemplo Ducemus (Latin: By example, shall we lead)
- Colors
- Anniversaries: 1 October (Regimental day)
- Engagements: Sri Lankan Civil War; 1971 JVP insurrection 1987–1989 JVP insurrection
- Website: alt.army.lk/slcmp

Commanders
- Centre Commandant: Brigadier MMMP Mahesh Kumara
- Provost Marshal: Major General A M R Abeysinghe
- Colonel of the Regiment: Maj Gen B G S Fernando

Insignia
- Flag

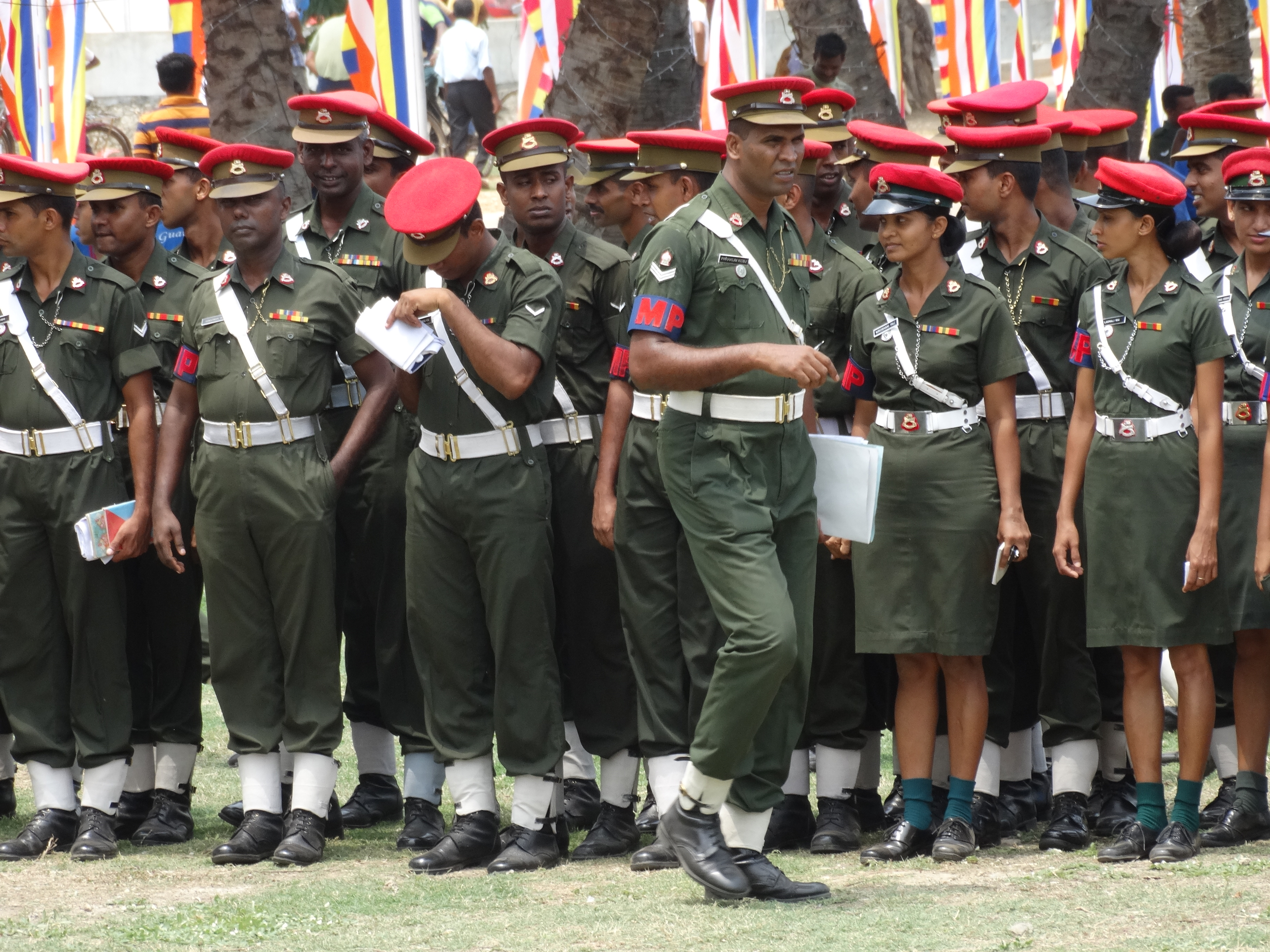
Sri Lanka Military Police for Buddha's Birthday in Jaffna, Sri Lanka 14 May 2014

The Sri Lanka Corps of Military Police (SLCMP) is the branch of the Sri Lanka Army responsible for the policing of service personnel and providing a military police presence on service property, operations, and exercises. It is headquartered at the Regimental Centre in Polhengoda, Colombo. Its members wear white webbing and white gaiters with barrack dress.

Policing in the Sri Lankan Army is carried out mainly by SLCMP and by the Regimental Police. The Sri Lanka Navy is policed by the Provost Branch. The Sri Lanka Air Force is policed by the Air Force Police (AFP).

== Missions ==
The Military Police force carries out the following missions:

=== Ceremonial duties ===
These ceremonial functions are performed mainly by the President's Ceremonial Guard Company.

- The corps performs presidential guard duty, including guard mounting at the President's House in Colombo and the President's Pavilion in Kandy. MPs assigned to the President's Ceremonial Guard Company wear a special ceremonial uniform known as the Presidential scarlet. A foot guards-type scarlet uniform is worn with a bayonet-mounted L1A1 SLR when mounting the outer guard, while a mounted guard-type scarlet long coat with gold girdles, shoulder mail and lance, in the tradition of the Governor's Bodyguard, is worn when mounting the inner guard.
- MPs in their ceremonial scarlet uniform provide guard mounting at state and military ceremonies, as well as motorcycle honour guards.
- MPs are assigned to stand vigil with reverse arms using L1A1 SLRs during remembrance services, state and military funerals.

=== Policing missions ===
- Maintenance of order and a high standard of discipline by provision of garrison police facilities: Consists of monitoring, maintaining, and, if necessary, re-establishing discipline and military order. This also involves controlling stragglers and refugees in times of war.
- Traffic control.
- Criminal investigations.

=== Security missions ===
- Prevents and deters any threat to or attack against the personnel and property of the armed forces. MPs also provide VIP motorcycle escorts, perform close protection missions, and escort classified documents and money transports.
- Tactical military police support to the army in all phases of military operations, and guarding prisoners of war.
- Counter-intelligence operations are also carried out by MPs within the army.

== History ==
With the establishment of the Ceylon Army in October 1948, a Provost Section was raised. The section then consisted of one officer and 16 NCOs. On 1 October 1951, the establishment was increased to that of a company, and Capt E.R.P De Zilwa was appointed officer commanding. In 1959, the company was elevated to unit status, and the commanding officer was promoted to lieutenant colonel.

With the later rapid expansion of the army, the corps also grew gradually, and it maintains provost sections at every army detachment.

In 1979, the military police assumed ceremonial guard duties, such as guard mounting at the President's House, and the President's Ceremonial Guard Company was formed to meet this requirement.

Specialized branches, such as the Special Investigations Branch and the Traffic School, were established by the provost to counter crimes, misconduct, and violations of road rules by army personnel on public highways. The Special Investigations Branch has now expanded into a Special Investigation Unit, operating directly under the Directorate of Provost Marshal.

The introduction of the Sri Lanka Army Women's Corps necessitated the maintenance of discipline among women soldiers, and the Provost Section of the MP Women was established in 1983.

== Organization ==
The overall command of the corps is exercised by the Directorate of the Provost Marshal (which in turn reports to the Directorate of Personnel Management at Army headquarters) and the Centre Commandant.

Unit	Established	Commanding Officer	Base
1st Regiment	1 October 1949	Major R M N Rathnayaka	Polhengoda, Colombo 5
2nd Regiment		Lt Col R Withanarachchi USP	Giritale
3rd Regiment	22 March 1991	Lieutenant Colonel WMTGAP Wijekoon	Galkulama, Anuradhapura
4th Regiment	19 April 1995	Major RRP Perera	Kankesanthurai
5th Regiment	10 April 2010	Major IMK Suddagala Lsc	Kilinochchi
6th Regiment	21 April 2011	Major J S Jayathilaka	Mullaitivu
7th Regiment	12 November 2015	Major S P Kasthuriarachchi	Diyatalawa
Special Investigation Unit (SIU)	6 June 1997	Colonel AMR Abeysinghe	Polhengoda, Colombo 5
SLCMP Training Centre	2002	Colonel D.M.A. Bandara	Giritale

== Notable members ==
- Major Basil Henricus – Ceylonese boxer who competed at the 1952 Summer Olympics.
- Sergeant Chaminda Ruwan Yakandawala – VIP motorcycle escort rider who died saving the life of General Sarath Fonseka from a suicide bomber.

== Order of precedence ==
Preceded by Sri Lanka Electrical and Mechanical Engineers	Order of Precedence	Succeeded by Sri Lanka Army General Service Corps

== See also ==
- Sri Lanka Army
- Law enforcement in Sri Lanka
