= Sri Lanka Light Infantry =

- Cap badge of the Sri Lanka Light Infantry
- Active: 1 April 1881 – Present
- Country: Sri Lanka
- Branch: Sri Lanka Army
- Type: Light infantry
- Role: Anti-tank warfare Artillery observer Close-quarters battle Combined arms Counterinsurgency; Jungle warfare Maneuver warfare Raiding; Reconnaissance; Urban warfare
- Size: 16 regular battalions 9 volunteer battalions 1 RFT battalion
- Regimental Headquarters: Panagoda Cantonment, Panagoda.
- Nickname: SLLI
- Motto: "Ich Dien" German – (I serve).
- Colors: Red and Blue
- March: "I am Ninety Five"
- Mascot: Kandula
- Anniversaries: 1 April
- Engagements: Second Boer War; World War I World War II; 1971 Insurrection; Insurrection 1987-89; Sri Lankan Civil War; United Nations Stabilization Mission in Haiti
- Decorations: 4 Parama Weera Vibhushanaya

Commanders
- Centre Commandant: Brig JKRP Jayasinghe RWP RSP USP
- Colonel of the Regiment: Maj Gen YABM Yahampath RWP RSP ndu psc
- Notable commanders: Gen. Sir John Kotelawala, KBE, CH

Insignia
- Identification symbol: "LIGHT INFANTRY" shoulder tab

The Sri Lanka Light Infantry (SLLI) is the oldest regiment in the Sri Lanka Army and the oldest infantry regiment in the army. It is made up of sixteen regular battalions and nine volunteer battalions, and is headquartered at the Panagoda Cantonment, Panagoda.

== History ==
The origins of the regiment go back to the formation of the Ceylon Light Infantry Volunteers (CLIV) which was formed on 1 April 1881 by a proclamation issued by the Governor of Ceylon; it was a reserve unit.

The first commanding officer of the force was Lt. Col. John Scott Armitage and the Colonel of the Regiment was HRH Albert Edward, the Prince of Wales. It is said that the Regimental March "I am Ninety Five" and the Regimental Bugle Call, in use up to now, was adopted soon after raising of the force. In the same year, the Unit had the distinction in that HRH the Prince of Wales accepted the Honorary Colonelcy of The Ceylon Light Infantry Volunteers, by virtue of which fact the Unit adopted his Crest and motto as Its badge. In 1892, a mounted infantry company was formed and later it became a regiment of its own by the name of the Ceylon Mounted Rifles.

The Ceylon Light Infantry Volunteer force troops were sent to South Africa in 1900, for the Boer war and after the distinguish service in South Africa the force obtained the Banner from HRH The Duke of York.In 1902, King Edward VII became the Colonel-in-Chief.

In 1910 with formation of the Ceylon Defence Force CLIV became a part of it and was renamed as the Ceylon Light Infantry. The regiment saw action during World War I along with allied troops. Soon after the war a regular element of the regiment was formed to take up garrison duties in Ceylon. This unit was named the Mobilised Detachment of Ceylon Light Infantry (Mob. Det., CLI). The regiment was again mobilized during World War II and was deployed in the Seychelles and the Cocos Islands. The third battalion was raised in 1941, a fourth battalion in late 1942, and a fifth battalion in April 1943. One battalion each was deployed at Colombo, Kandy and Trincomalee, with the fourth battalion under training and one battalion reserved for special duties. Soon after the war a regular element of the regiment was formed to take up garrison duties in Ceylon. This unit was named the Mobilised Detachment of Ceylon Light Infantry (Mob. Det., CLI).

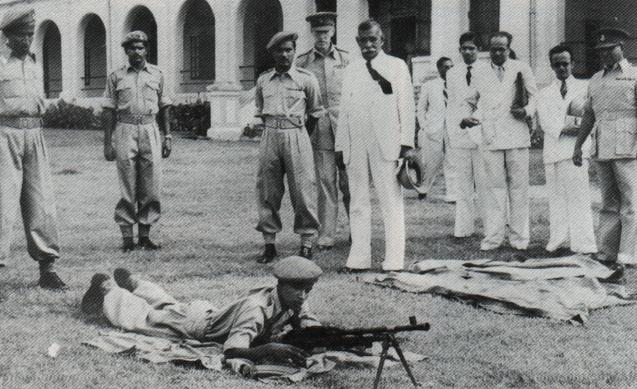
First Prime Minister of Independent Sri Lanka Hon. D.S.Senanayaka visiting the 1st battalion of the CLI at the Echelon Square and watching volunteers being trained to handle light machine guns.

After Ceylon gained its independence from Britain in 1948 and with the Army Act of 1949 the CLI became the Ceylon Infantry Regiment and came under the newly formed Ceylon Army. But in 1950 the regiment once again became the 1st Battalion, The Ceylon Light Infantry becoming the regular unit and the Volunteer Battalion was re-designated as the 2nd (Volunteer) Battalion, Ceylon Light Infantry.

The regiment was deployed for counter insurgency operations in during the 1971 Insurrection and in 1972, when Sri Lanka became a republic, the regiment changed its name to Sri Lanka Light Infantry. In the early 1980s units of the regiment has been deployed in the northern parts of the island. In the ambush of the Four Four Bravo patrol from the C Company of the 1st Battalion marked the beginning of the Sri Lanka civil war. Since then the SLLI has been deployed combat operations thought out the island and has expanded to its present size of 15 Battalions.

The regiment took part in the United Nations Stabilization Mission in Haiti in 2003.

== Cadet Battalion ==
In 1881 a cadet platoon was formed at Royal College, Colombo attached to the CLI. This eventually expanded to became the Cadet Battalion, Ceylon Light Infantry under the Ceylon Defence Force. Later this unit became the Ceylon Cadet Corps, now known as the National Cadet Corps.

== Regimental Colours ==
The regimental colours were awarded to the regiment in 1921 and on 22 March 1922 Ceylon Light Infantry was awarded with the King's and the Regimental Colours. The Queen's and Regimentals Colours were presented to the 1st battalion on 21 April 1954 by HM Queen Elizabeth II. With the declaration of the Republic of Sri Lanka were land to rest within the regimental museum on 29 June 1974.

On 10 October 1978 H.E. President J.R. Jayawardena awarded the President's and Regimental Colours to the 1st Bn SLLI and 2nd Vol Bn SLLI.

== Regimental Insignia ==
In early stage, from March 1881 to 28 November 1881 volunteer corps used an elephant and a coconut tree as their emblem. With the declaration of republic of Sri Lanka 1st and 2nd battalions of CLI decided to retain as much with the configuration and pattern of the existing badge. As result of these suggestions, a new insignia was introduced with following details;

- To retain the silver bugle horn bound with brass, which is on the existing badge. This was retained because the bugle traditionally represents the infantry arm and by doing so, the Regiment could perpetuate in no small measure some of the high ideals associated with the previous insignia.
- It in corporate with three sheaves of paddy arranged in a manner of up to the three plumps on the existing crest. These were in corporate to signify prosperity and the heritage of the people as an agrarian nation. It retains the motto of the Prince of Wales "ICH DIEN" which has been adopted as the motto of the regiment in its translation form "I SERVE".

== Units ==
=== Regular battalions ===
- 1st Sri Lanka Light Infantry (formed on 1950)
- 3rd Sri Lanka Light Infantry (formed on 16 December 1985 at Thissawewa camp Anuradhapura, later re-designated as the 1st Mechanized Infantry Regiment)
- 4th Sri Lanka Light Infantry (formed on 5 May 1987 at Monkey Bridge camp Trincomalee. First commanding officer was Lieutenant Colonel U.A. Gunawardana)
- 6th Sri Lanka Light Infantry (formed on 8 June 1990 at Panagoda Cantonment. First commanding officer was Major D. Ratnasabapathy)
- 7th Sri Lanka Light Infantry (formed on 20 November 1992 at Mandative. First commanding officer was Lieutenant Colonel G.M. Rockwood)
- 8th Sri Lanka Light Infantry (formed on 16 January 1993 and first commanding office was Major J.S. Masakkara)
- 10th Sri Lanka Light Infantry (formed on 23 January 1994 at Mathagal and disbanded 1999. reformed 5 May 2001)
- 11th Sri Lanka Light Infantry (formed on 25 June 2007)
- 12th Sri Lanka Light Infantry (formed on 3 December 2007)
- 15th Sri Lanka Light Infantry
- 19th Sri Lanka Light Infantry
- 20th Sri Lanka Light Infantry
- 23rd Sri Lanka Light Infantry (formed on 23 July 2009)
- 24th Sri Lanka Light Infantry (formed on 25 September 2009)
- 25th Sri Lanka Light Infantry (formed on 20 September 2010)
- 26th Sri Lanka Light Infantry (formed on 20 September 2010)
- RHQ Battalion Sri Lanka Light Infantry (RFT) (Formed on 23 October 1989 at Panagoda Cantonment)

=== Volunteer battalions ===
- 2nd (V) Sri Lanka Light Infantry (Formed on 1 April 1881)
- 5th (V) Sri Lanka Light Infantry (Formed on 15 August 1987 from disbanded 7 (V) SLAC and at Pallekele, Kandy. First commanding officer was Lieutenant Colonel M.J. De Alwis)
- 9th (V) Sri Lanka Light Infantry (Formed on 1 November 1993 at Milady South and first commanding officer was Major T.B. Galgamuwa)
- 14th (V) Sri Lanka Light Infantry (Formed on 31 December 1996 at Kayts)
- 16th (V) Sri Lanka Light Infantry (Formed on 1 December 2007)
- 17th (V) Sri Lanka Light Infantry (Formed on 30 March 2008)
- 18th (V) Sri Lanka Light Infantry (Formed on 1 January 2009 at Kelanimulla Camp and disbanded on 29 July 2018)
- 21st (V) Sri Lanka Light Infantry (Formed on 16 March 2009 and disbanded on 29 July 2018)
- 22nd (V) Sri Lanka Light Infantry (Formed on 14 January 2009 and disbanded on 30 March 2012)

== Deployments ==
- Second Boer War
- World War I
  - Home defence
  - Western front
- World War II
  - Home defence
  - Seychelles
  - Cocos Islands
- 1971 Insurrection
- Insurrection 1987-89
- Sri Lankan Civil War
  - Eelam War I
  - Eelam War II
  - Eelam War III
  - Eelam War IV
- United Nations Stabilization Mission in Haiti

== Recipients of the Parama Weera Vibhushanaya ==
- Corporal A. M. N. P. Abesinghe †
- Lance Corporal W. I. M. Seneviratne †
- Lance Corporal T. G. D. R. Dayananda †
- Lance Corporal R. M. D. M. Rathnayake †

== Recipients of the Weera Wickrama Vibhushanaya ==
- General Shantha Kottegoda
- Major General R. A. Nugera
- Major General H. M. J. K. Gunaratne
- Major M. M. M. Raj Fernando †
- Major C. T. C. Serasinghe †
- Lieutenant P. D. G. R. Nanayakkara
- Lieutenant A. W. W. N. M. Silva †
- Second lieutenant K. M. U. B. Konarasinghe (6 ^{th} Sri Lanka Light Infantry)
- Sergeant U. M. Ekanayake (7th Sri Lanka Light Infantry) †
- Lance Corporal R. U. S. Dissanayeke (4th Sri Lanka Light Infantry) †
- Lance Corporal H. M. Nawarathne †
- Lance Corporal G. J. Silva (3rd Sri Lanka Light Infantry) †

== Honorary Colonels ==
- Prince Albert, the Prince of Wales (later King Edward VII)
- Prince Edward, the Prince of Wales (later King Edward VIII)
- Prince Henry, Duke of Gloucester (1937–1972)

== Commanders ==
- Major General Anton Muttukumaru, OBE, ED – 3rd Commander of the Ceylon Army (First Ceylonese)
- Major GeneralH. W. G. Wijeyekoon OBE, ED - 4th Commander of the Ceylon Army
- Major General A.R. Udugama, MBE – 5th Commander of the Ceylon Army
- Major General B.R. Heyn – 6th Commander of the Ceylon Army
- General D. S. Attygalle, MVO – 7th Commander of the Sri Lankan Army
- General T. I. Weerathunga, VSV, ndc – 9th Commander of the Sri Lankan Army and 1st Chief of the Defence Staff
- General Shantha Kottegoda, WWV, RWP, RSP, VSP, ndc -17th Commander of the Sri Lankan Army
- General Daya Ratnayake, WWV, RWP, RSP, USP - 20th Commander of the Sri Lankan Army

== Chiefs of Staff ==
- Brigadier M. A. Jayaweera - 8th Chief of Staff of the Sri Lanka Army.
- Brigadier E. T. De Z Abeysekera - 9th Chief of Staff of the Sri Lanka Army.
- Brigadier C. T. Caldera - 10th Chief of Staff of the Sri Lanka Army.
- Brigadier T. S. B. Sally - 12th Chief of Staff of the Sri Lanka Army.
- General Cyril Ranatunga - 14th Chief of Staff of the Sri Lanka Army.
- Brigadier E. G. Thevanayagam - 16th Chief of Staff of the Sri Lanka Army.
- Brigadier J. G. Balthazar - 17th Chief of Staff of the Sri Lanka Army.
- Major General C. A. M. N. Silva - 18th Chief of Staff of the Sri Lanka Army.
- Major General S.M.A. Jayawardena - 20th Chief of Staff of the Sri Lanka Army.
- Major General A.M.U. Seneviratne - 27th Chief of Staff of the Sri Lanka Army.
- Major General Nanda Mallawaarachchi, RWP, VSV, USP, ndc, psc - 38th Chief of Staff of the Sri Lanka Army.
- Major General Amal Karunasekara, RSP, USP, ndu, psc, MSc - 51st Chief of Staff of the Sri Lanka Army.
- Major General Jagath Kodithuwakku - 60th Chief of Staff of the Sri Lanka Army.
- Major General Channa Weerasuriya - 61st Chief of Staff of the Sri Lanka Army.

== Deputy Chiefs of Staff ==
- Major General A. M. U. Seneviratne – 3 ^{rd} Deputy Chief of Staff of the Sri Lanka Army.
- Major General Asoka Jayawardena – 7 ^{th} Deputy Chief of Staff of the Sri Lanka Army.

== Notable members ==
- General Sir John Lionel Kotelawala, CH, KBE – Former Prime Minister of Ceylon
- Major General Lakshman 'Lucky' Wijayaratne † RWP, RSP – Former brigade commander, 22 Brigade
- Major General Piyal Abeysekera USP, MSc - former Deputy Chief of Staff of Sri Lanka Army
- Major General T.T. Ranjith de Silva, RWP, RSP, USP, PSC – Former Security Forces Commander – Eastern Province and Government Agent, Trincomalee District
- Brigadier Christopher Allan Hector Perera Jayawardena CMG CVO OStJ OBE ED - Conservator of Forests
- Colonel Waldo Sansoni, OBE, VD, JP, UM – Colonel commanding, Ceylon Light Infantry (1935–1939)
- Colonel T G Jayewardene – First Ceylonese commanding officer and former member of the State Council of Ceylon
- Lieutenant Colonel Sir Hector van Cuylenburg, VD - first elected unofficial member representing the Burghers in the Legislative Council of Ceylon
- Lieutenant Colonel Angelo Peiris, RWP, RSP † – Leader of the first wave of the seaborne landing during Operation Balavegaya
- Lieutenant Colonel Dhananjaya Weerabahu Wijesinghe, RSP † – 2nd Commander – 7th Sri Lanka Light Infantry during the Third Eelam War
- Major E. A. Nugawela - first Cabinet Minister of Education of Ceylon, later Cabinet Minister of Health, a Member of Parliament and State Council.
- Major Montague Jayawickrama - Government Ministers and Provincial Governor
- Major Bevis Bawa, ADC, CLI - former Aide-de-camp to the Governor of Ceylon
- Captain Ravi Jayewardene, CLI - former National Security Adviser
- Justice Eugene Wilfred Jayewardene – Judge of the Supreme Court of Ceylon
- Herbert Sri Nissanka, QC - Member of Parliament from Kurunegala

== Order of precedence ==
Preceded by Sri Lanka Signals Corps	Order of Precedence	Succeeded by Sri Lanka Sinha Regiment

== External links and sources ==
- Sri Lanka Army
- Sri Lanka Light Infantry
- The museum of the Sri Lanka Light Infantry
