= Sri Lanka Artillery =

- Active: 20 April 1888 - present 138 years old
- Country: Sri Lanka
- Branch: Sri Lanka Army
- Type: Artillery
- Role: Artillery gun warfare
- Size: 10 regular regiments, 2 volunteer regiments
- Regimental Headquarters: Panagoda
- Nickname: Gunners
- Mottos: On the Way to Justice and Glory
- Colors
- March: The British Grenadiers
- Anniversaries: 20 April
- Engagements: Second Boer War; World War I World War II; 1971 Insurrection; Insurrection 1987-89; Sri Lankan Civil War

Commanders
- Colonel Commandant: Maj Gen W A S S Wanasinghe RSP USP VSV ndc
- Centre Commandant: Brig B G S Fernando USP Hdmc psc
- Brigade Commander: Brig S P Malawarage RSP USP IG
- Regimental Sergeant Major: WO1 B M G G S A Basnayaka
- Notable commanders: Colonel F. C. de Saram OBE

Insignia
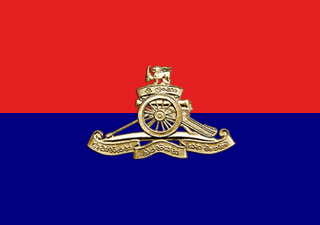
- Flag

The Sri Lanka Artillery (SLA) is the artillery arm of the Sri Lanka Army. It is made up of ten regular regiments and two volunteer regiments. The SLA is headquartered at Panagoda Cantonment, Panagoda.

The emblem of the SLA is modeled after that used by the Royal Artillery, but with the lion from both the flag and emblem instead of the crown, with the lion depicted holding the Kastane sabre.

Unlike other artillery units in the Commonwealth the SLA is entitled to a strand of Colours.

== History ==
=== Ceylon Artillery Volunteers ===
The roots of the Sri Lanka Artillery goes back to 1888, when on 12 April 1888 the Ceylon Artillery Volunteers was formed as a gun battery under the command of Captain C.E.H Symons of the Royal Artillery to man a gun battery equipped with BL 12-pounder 6 cwt guns. By 1901 it numbered a strength of 162. In 1910, its headquarters was moved to Galle Buck Road in Colombo Fort (which is now part of SLNS Parakrama). During World War I the Ceylon Artillery Volunteers were mobilised, along with the Town Guard Artillery of Colombo, for the defence of Colombo against German commerce raiders.

=== Ceylon Garrison Artillery ===
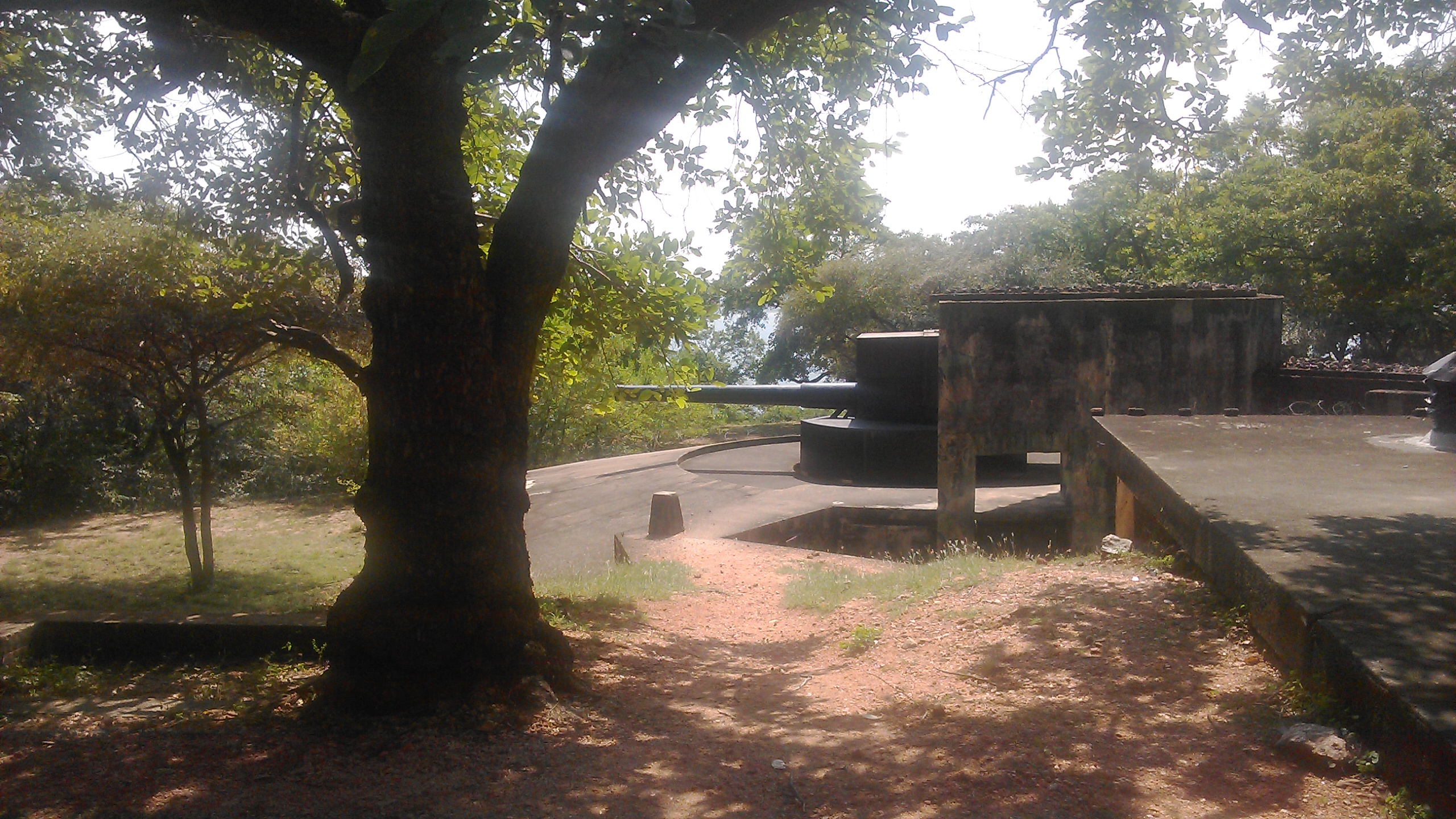
A BL 6 inch gun, of the Ostenburg battery in Trincomalee

In 1918, the Ceylon Garrison Artillery (CGA) was formed by amalgamating the Ceylon Artillery Volunteers and the Town Guard Artillery, coming under the Ceylon Defence Force. During the colonial period the main responsibility of the Ceylon Garrison Artillery was to assist the Royal Artillery manning the coastal defence of Ceylon, by operating Coastal artillery batteries in Colombo and Trincomalee.

With the onset of World War II, the CGA was mobilised and expanded. The expansion saw the 1st Coast Regiment raising one field and four coast batteries. Heavy coastal batteries around Colombo at Battenburg, Galle Face and Mutwal were manned by the 1st Coast Regiment equipped with BL 9.2-inch guns and BL 6 inch Mk VII naval guns. The 2nd Heavy Anti-Aircraft Regiment, was formed and headquartered in Trincomalee equipped with QF 3.7-inch AA guns, followed by the 3rd Searchlight/Light Anti-Aircraft Regiment based in Colombo equipped with 40mm Bofors guns. These formations defended Colombo and Trincomalee during the air attacks that occurred as part of the Indian Ocean raid by the Imperial Japanese Navy. The CGA was also deployed overseas to support the Allied and Commonwealth forces in the Indian Ocean. A detachment of CGA was deployed in defence of the Seychelles and the Cocos Islands manning 6 inch Coastal Guns. There on the night of 8 May 1942, 30 out of 56 personnel of the CGA detachment on Horsburgh Island mutinied in what was known as the Cocos Islands mutiny. Following the mutiny, no combat units from Ceylon were deployed overseas, support units were deployed with Commonwealth forces. With the end of the war CGA was demobilized.

=== Ceylon Artillery ===
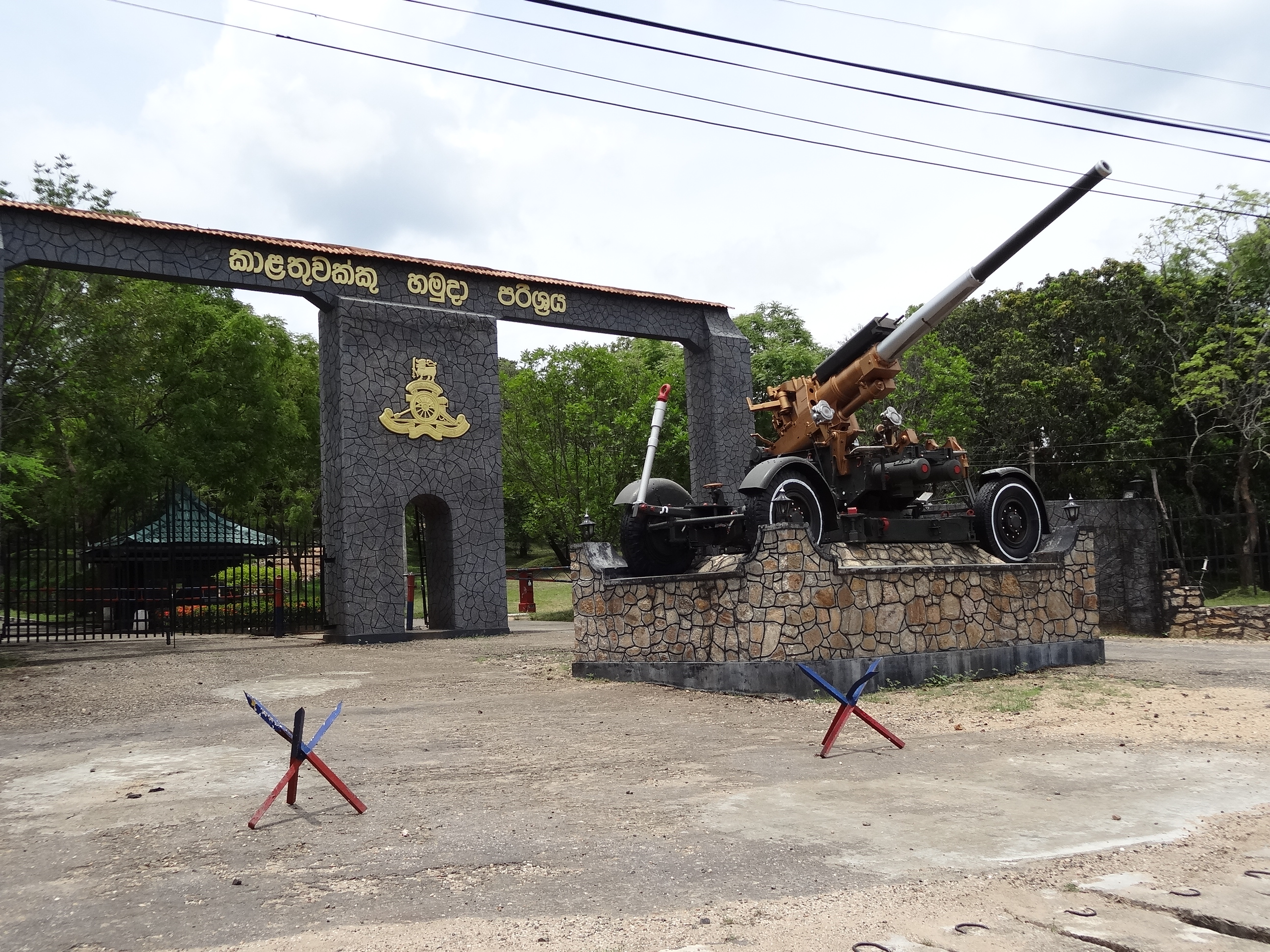
A QF 3.7-inch AA gun as a gate guardian at the Artillery Complex in Minneriya

In 1948, Ceylon gained self-rule and the Ceylon Army was formed on 1 October 1949 under the Army Act of 1949 and the Ceylon Defence Force disbanded. The Ceylon Garrison Artillery became the Ceylon Artillery with some of its personal transferring to the regular force and others continuing as volunteers. That year the 1st Heavy Anti-Aircraft Regiment (HAA) of the Ceylon Artillery was formed under the command of Lt. Col. (later Colonel) F. C. de Saram, OBE equipped with 40 mm anti-aircraft guns and 3.7 inch heavy anti-aircraft guns at Rock House. The 2nd Volunteer Coastal Artillery / Anti-Aircraft Regiment was formed in 1949, under the command of Lt. Col. J.A.T. Perera, ED manning the BL 6 inch coastal guns, made up of officers and men of the Ceylon Garrison Artillery. In 1953 the 1st HAA was renamed the 1st Light Anti-Aircraft Regiment (LAA). In the same year the 3rd Field Artillery Regiment was formed equipped with ML 4.2-inch heavy mortars.

In 1962, an attempted military coup by senior military and police officers took place, with many officers of the Ceylon Artillery, including Colonel De Saram being implicated. The government purged military of officers and other ranks found to be associated with the coup. The Ceylon Artillery suffered badly, with the all three of its regiments being disbanded. Remaining officers and other ranks of the 1st Light Anti-Aircraft Regiment and the 3rd Field Artillery Regiment were amalgamated to form the 4th Regiment, Ceylon Artillery on 26 April 1963, thus reducing the Ceylon Artillery to a single regiment. The coastal artillery batteries were decommissioned.

In April 1971, the Ceylon Army was mobilized to faced the 1971 JVP insurrection. Lacking field artillery, the 4th Regiment deployed its troops as infantry for counter insurgency operations until it received 14 76 mm mountain guns from Yugoslav and 30 85 mm Type 60 anti-tank guns from China. These were used to bombard insurgent holdouts.

=== Sri Lanka Artillery ===
The CA was renamed in 1972 as the Sri Lanka Artillery when Ceylon became a republic. The 4th Regiment, Sri Lanka Artillery transitioned into a field artillery role as it decommissioned its anti-aircraft guns. Several years later the air defence role of the Sri Lankan military was taken over by the Sri Lanka Air Force Regiment, which it carries out to this day.

In 1980 a new volunteer regiment, the 5th (V) Artillery Regiment was formed from the 2nd Battalion of the Ceylon National Guard. With the onset of the Sri Lankan Civil War, SLA grew in size and added British Ordnance QF 25 pounder Mark III field guns to its inventory. These were used in major military operations in the 1980s such as the Vadamarachchi Operation. 24 3.7-inch AA guns were in service till the early 1990s New regiments were formed with new sources of weaponry in the 1990s and 2000s from China and the Czech Republic. With the escalation of the Sri Lankan civil war 85 mm Type 56 field guns, 122 mm howitzers, 152 mm gun-howitzers, 130 mm field guns and 120 mm mortars, 82 mm mortars were introduced, and in 2000 RM-70 Multiple rocket launchers were added, increasing SLA's firepower. Target acquisition was carried out to locate enemy guns using AN/TPQ-36 Firefinder radars and SLC-2 Radar as counter-battery radars by its Independent Locating Battery.

At present the Sri Lanka Artillery has nine regular regiments, two volunteer regiments and a regimental band. These units form the Artillery Brigade. During the civil war, SLA has provided fire support for almost all military operations carried out by the Sri Lanka Army. At times the SLA has deployed one regular (RFT) and two volunteer regiments in an infantry role to meet the shortage of infantry. In 2020, the SLA raised the 15th Drone Regiment for surveillance and target acquisition, deploying UAVs to monitor isolated areas during the COVID-19 pandemic.

== Units ==
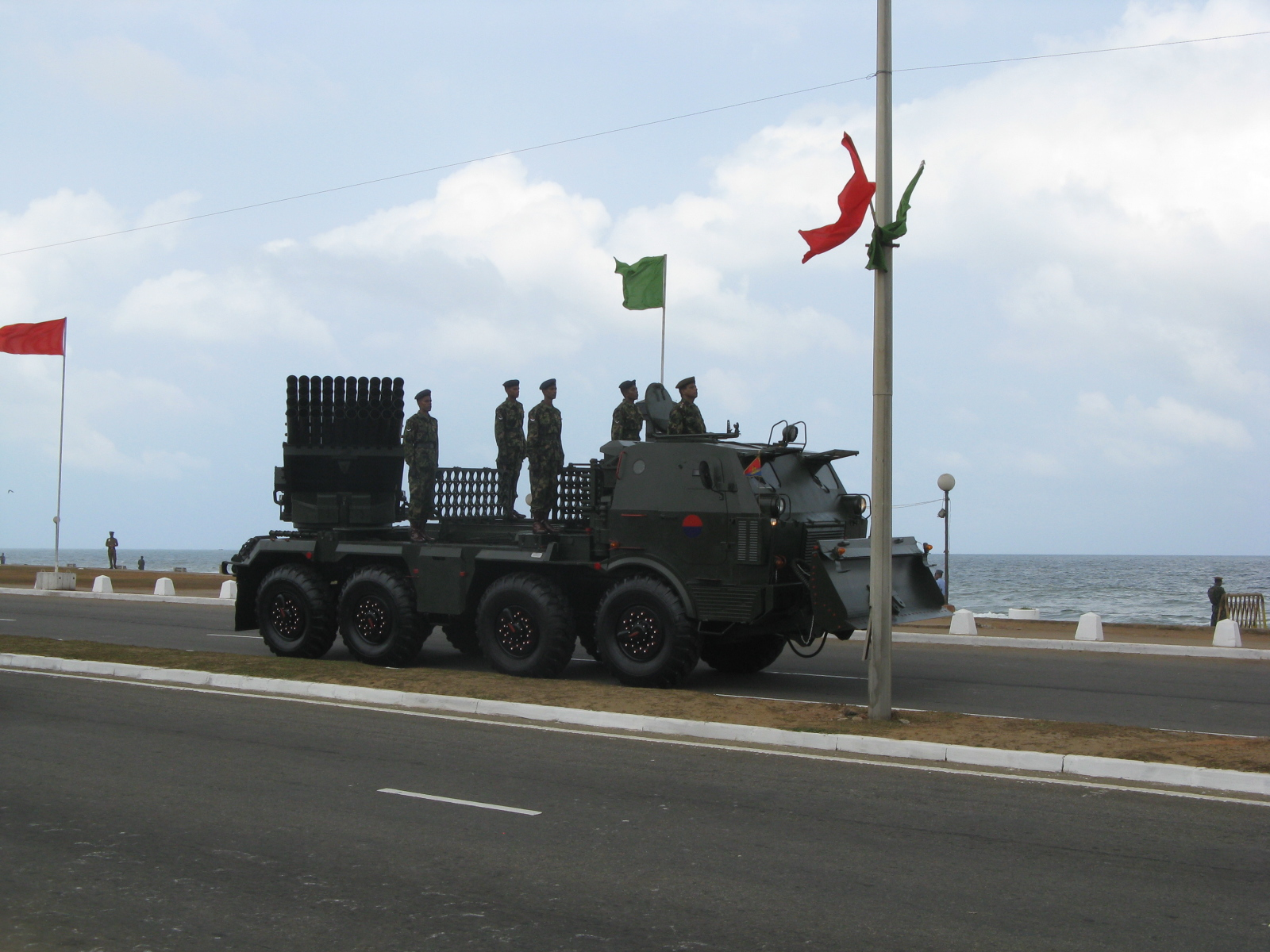
RM-70 multi barrel rocket launcher - Sri Lanka Artillery

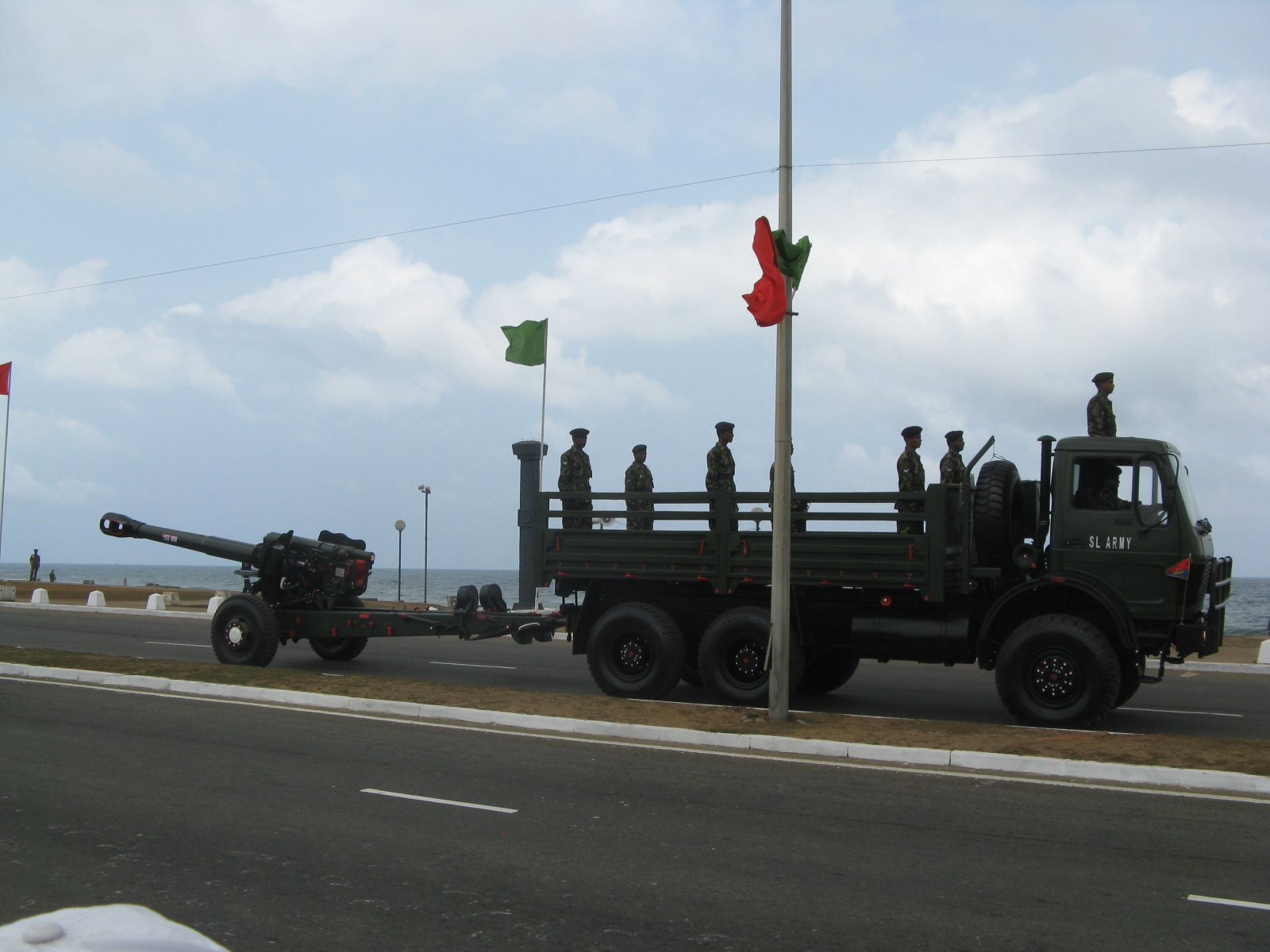
122 mm artillery

=== Regular regiments ===
- 4th Field Regiment SLA - equipped with 122 mm Type 60 howitzers and 130 mm Type 59 field guns
- 6th Field Regiment SLA - equipped with 122 mm Type 60 howitzers for operational duties
  - Ceremonial Saluting Battery - equipped ordnance QF 25 pounder field guns for firing salutes
- 7th Light Regiment SLA - equipped with 120mm mortars
- 8th Medium Regiment SLA - equipped with 130 mm Type 59 field guns
- 9th Field Regiment SLA - equipped with 122 mm Type 54 howitzers
- 10th Medium Regiment SLA - equipped with 152 mm Type 66 gun-howitzers
- 11th Regiment SLA - Reinforcement Regiment (RFT) in infantry role
- 14th Rocket Regiment SLA - equipped with RM-70 multiple rocket launcher
- 15th UAV Regiment SLA - equipped with unmanned air vehicles
- Independent Locating Battery - equipped with AN/TPQ-36 Firefinder radars and SLC-2 Radars

=== Volunteer regiments ===
- 5th (Volunteer) Regiment SLA (Formed on 22 January 1980) - infantry role
- 12th (Volunteer) Regiment SLA (Formed on 9 September 1990) - infantry role (Converted from 8 Sri Lanka National Guard)

=== Disbanded regiments ===
- 1st Light Anti-Aircraft Regiment - 1963
- 2nd Volunteer Coastal Artillery Regiment - 1963
- 3rd Field Artillery Regiment - 1963
- 16th Regiment SLA (RFT) - 2019

=== School of Artillery ===
In 1957, an Instructor Gunnery (IG) section was formed under Chief Instructor Major B. I. Loyela for training on the use of anti-aircraft guns. On 16 September 1985, the IG section based at the Panagoda Cantonment was reorganized as the School of Artillery to facilitate the expansion of the Regiment of Artillery. It was moved to the Minneriya Garrison in October 1990.

Its programs include:

Officers

- Artillery Senior Command Course
- Officers' Long Gunnery Staff Course
- Gun Position Officer Course
- Forward Observation Officer Course
- Young Officers Course

Other ranks

- Long Gunnery and Staff Course
- Basic Gun Course
- Technical Assistants Course
- Survey Course
- Signal Course
- Observation Post Assistant Course
- Gun No 1 Course
- Troop Leader Course
- Locating Course
- Assistant in Gunnery Long Course

== Equipment ==
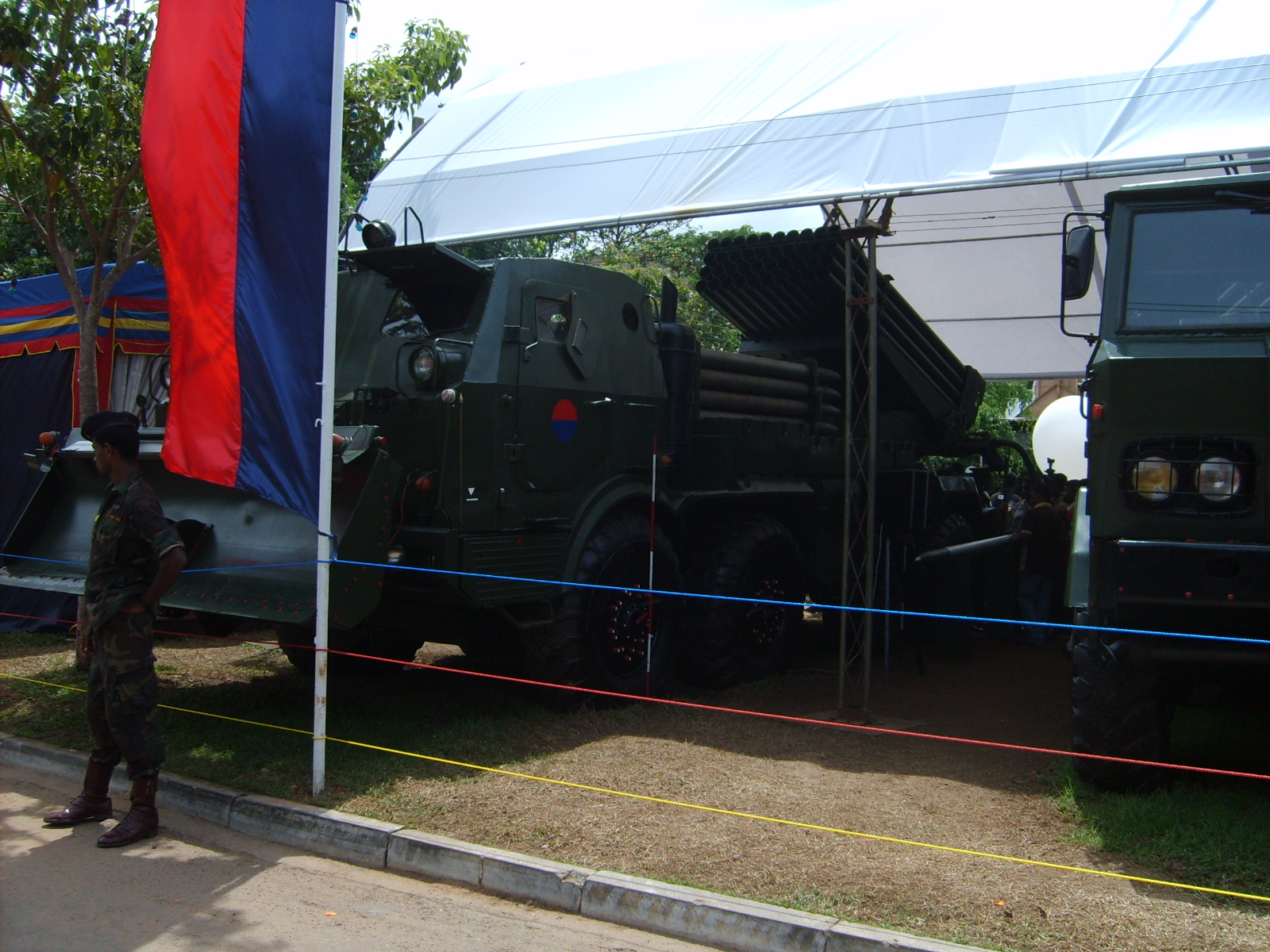
A RM-70 multiple rocket launcher of the Sri Lanka Artillery

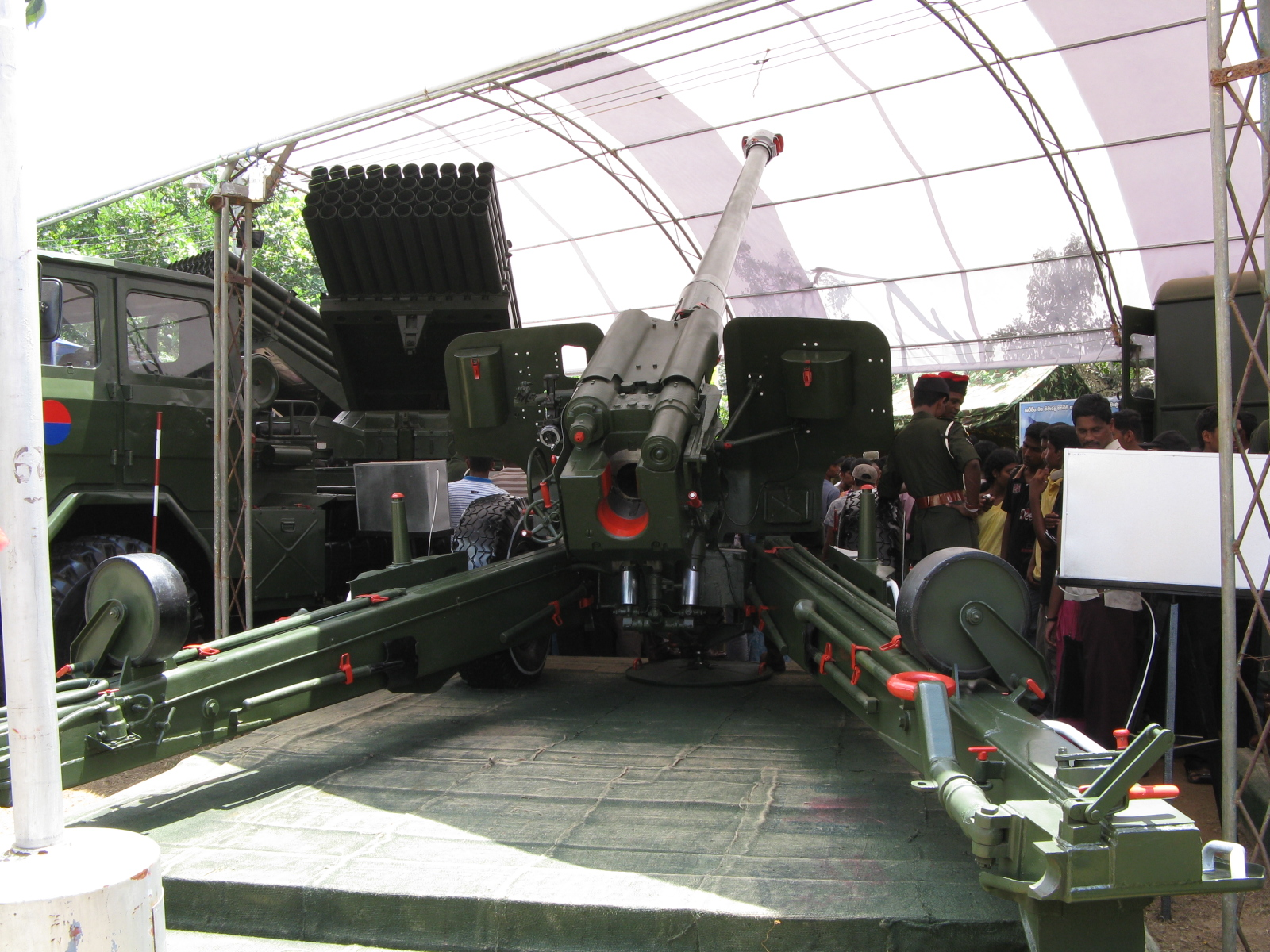
Type 66 152mm artillery

Ceremonial

- Ordnance QF 25 pounder field guns (ceremonial gun battery)
- 76 mm mountain gun M48 mountain guns (colour gun)

Light artillery (mortars)

- Type 86 (W86) 120 mm mortars

Field artillery

- 122 mm Type 54 howitzers
- 122 mm Type 60 howitzers
- 122 mm Type 83 howitzers

Medium artillery

- 130 mm Type 59 field guns
- 152 mm Type 66 gun-howitzers

Rocket artillery

- RM-70 Multiple rocket launcher
- KRL 122 Multiple rocket launcher
- PHL-81 Multiple rocket launcher ( In reserve storage)

Surveillance & target acquisition

- AN/TPQ-36 Firefinder radar
- SLC-2 Radar

== Notable members ==
- General Hamilton Wanasinghe, VSV - former Commander of the Army
- General L. P. Balagalle, VSV, USP, ndc, IG - former Commander of the Army
- General Srilal Weerasooriya, RWP, RSP, VSV, USP - former Commander of the Army.
- Major General Gratian Silva, VSV - former Military Secretary
- Major General Duleep Wickramanayake - former Director Operations and Training
- Major General Jayantha de S. Jayaratne, VSV, ndc, IG - former Commander Security Forces Jaffna
- Major General Sarath Munasinghe RWP, RSP, USP - former Deputy Speaker of Parliament and Commander Security Forces Headquarters, Jaffna
- Major General Larry Wijeratne † - former Brigade commander, 514 Brigade
- Major General Ananda Hamangoda † - former Brigade commander, 512 Brigade, Jaffna
- Major General Larry Wijeratne † - former Brigade commander, 514 Brigade
- Brigadier B. K. V. J. E. Rodrigo - former Commandant of the Volunteer Force
- Brigadier Leonard Merlyn Wickremasooriya - former Commandant, Army Training Centre, Diyatalawa
- Brigadier K.T.Sujeewa Gunawardhana, RSP, USP - first commanding officer, 14th Rocket Regiment SLA
- Colonel Fredrick C. de Saram OBE, CA - former Commanding officer, 1st Heavy Anti-Aircraft Regiment, Ceylon Artillery & leader of the attempted military coup in 1962
- Lieutenant Colonel Wilmot "Willie" S. Abrahams, MC, MBE, CA - former Commanding Officer, 3rd Field Artillery Regiment, Ceylon Artillery & accused conspirator in the 1962 coup d'état attempt
- Major Victor Gunasekara, CCS - former Controller of Imports Exports and government agent of Kegalle
- Lieutenant Ajantha Mendis - international cricketer
- Bombardier Gratien Fernando - leader of the Cocos Islands Mutiny

== Alliances ==
- United Kingdom - Royal Regiment of Artillery

== Order of precedence ==
Preceded by Sri Lanka Armoured Corps	Order of Precedence	Succeeded by Sri Lanka Engineers
Preceded by Mechanized Infantry Regiment (with armored vehicles)	Order of Precedence (with guns)	Succeeded by Sri Lanka Engineers (with engineering vehicles)

== See also ==
- Sri Lanka Army
- Cocos Islands Mutiny

== External links and sources ==
- Sri Lanka Army
- Sri Lanka Artillery
- The Cocos Mutiny, 66 years on, as recalled by (Donny) Vincent Ranasinghe, the last surviving member of the Ceylon Garrison Artillery (CGA) who served on the island
