= Whist Bungalow =

Pradeepa Hall (formally Whist Bungalow) is a large bungalow (as mansions are referred to locally) in Colombo, Sri Lanka. A nineteenth century stately home modeled on Neoclassical style, located in Mutwal north of Colombo on the cost where the Kelani River used to meet the Indian Ocean. It is now used as a reception hall for weddings.

== History ==
Built by Henry Augustus Marshall, an Englishmen who accompanied Lord North who was the first British Governor of Ceylon. Marshall was an officer in the Ceylon Civil Service and went on to serve as Auditor General of Ceylon. He built Whist Bungalow as a small retreat in addition to his other houses Rock House and Modera House.

The house was bought by the Supreme Court Judge Sir Richard Morgan who expanded the house to its current appearance and extend the garden. It was inherited by his son who died suddenly and is rumored haunt the house. Louis H. S. Pieris, the son-in-law of Sir Charles Henry de Soysa thereafter became the owner and it was later leased to Stipperger, the representative of the Austrian Lloyd Shipping Company in Colombo. During this time Ernst Haeckel and Lord Llandaff where guests at Whist.

Later the government took over the bungalow for use as the official residence of the Inspector General of Police. It was bought at government auction the wealthy merchant C.S. Antony and the family lived until it was leased as a tea store used by companies such as Bartleets, JEDB and SPC. During this time it was briefly own by the Government Minister V.A Sugathadasa. As a result of these exchanges size of the estate had reduced over the years and as a result of the land reclamation act of 1972, many of the servants living in the out houses gained ownership of them.

In the 1980s it was acquired by the Urban Development Authority, which refurbished it and renamed it as Pradeepa Hall. It was open as a venue for public functions by Prime Minister R. Premadasa on February 10, 1987. Since then it has been managed by the National Housing Development Authority with the latest refurbishments undertaken in 2010.
