= Minneriya Garrison =

Coordinates: 8°02′25″N 80°54′23″E

- Minneriya, North Central Province
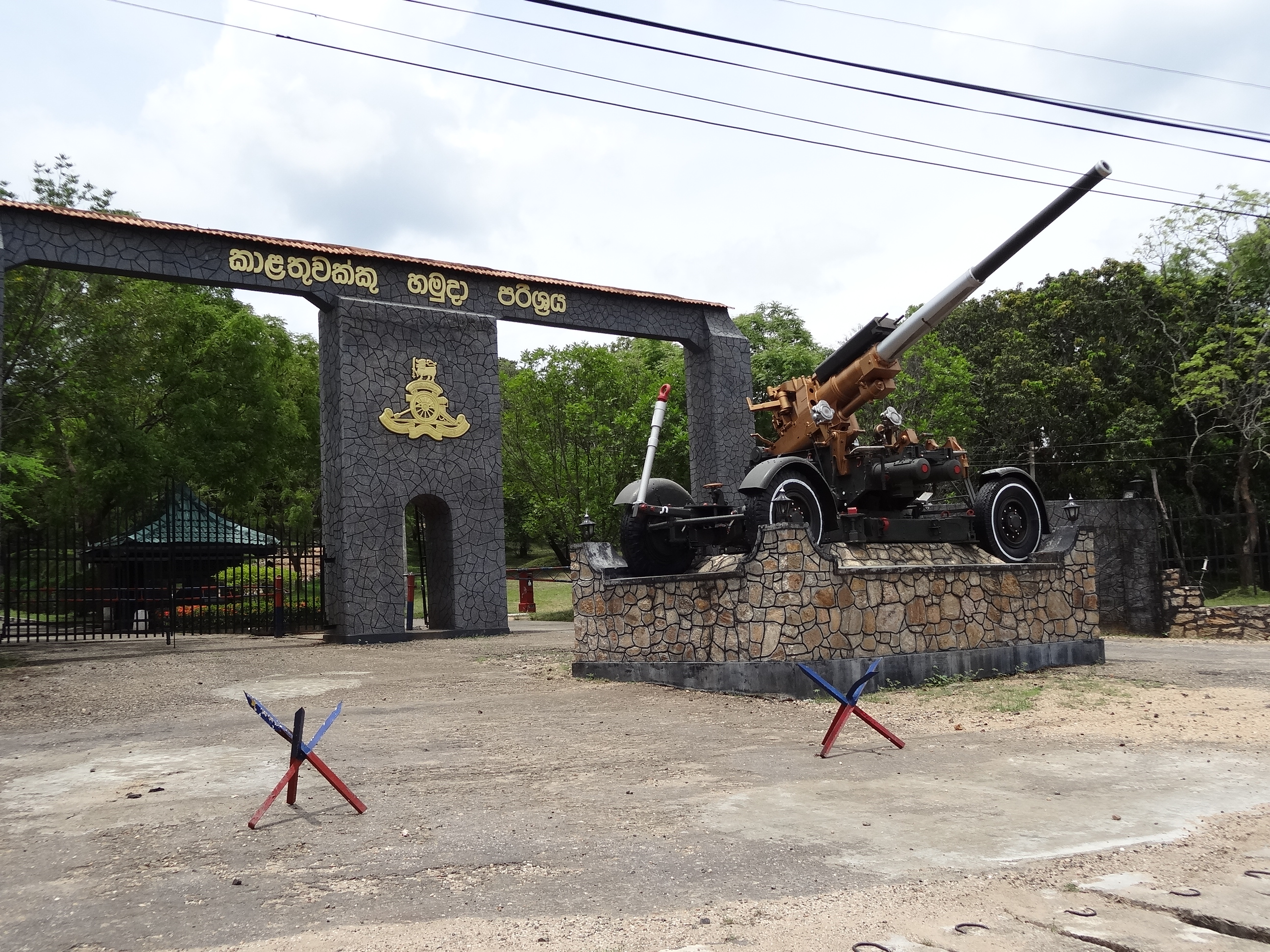

Site information
- Type: Military Base

Site history
- In use: 1980s – present

Garrison information
- Garrison: Sri Lanka Artillery

The Minneriya Garrison is a common name used for collection of military bases of the Sri Lanka Army located in and around the Minneriya in the North Central Province. It is home to several training centers of the army, including the Infantry Training Centre and the School of Artillery of the Sri Lanka Artillery. SLAF Hingurakgoda is situated in close proximity.

The garrison was established in the 1980s and expanded with the rapid growth of the army in the 1980s and 1990s with escalation of the Sri Lankan Civil War. Apart from serving as training grounds for infantry and artillery, the garrison served as command headquarters and forward staging area for military operations.

== Training centers ==
- Infantry Training Centre
- School of Artillery
- Sri Lanka Corps of Military Police School
