= 15 cm L/40 Feldkanone i.R. =

15 cm Feldkanone L/40 i.R.L.
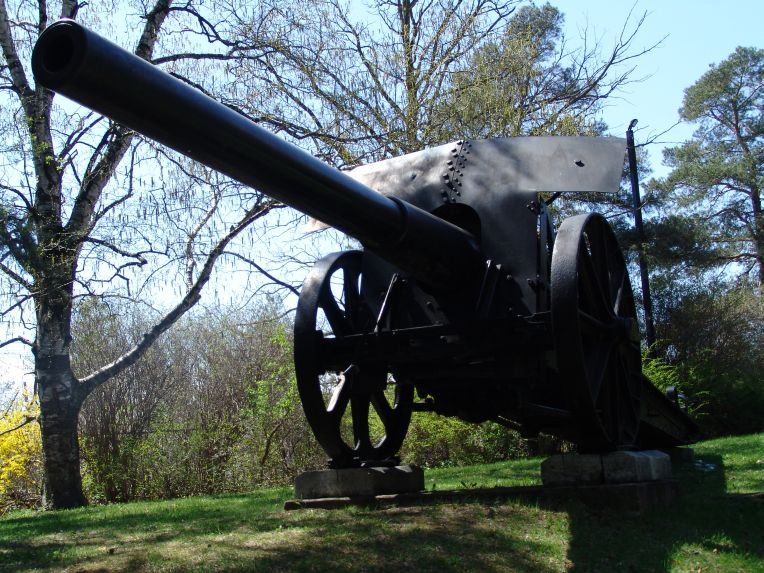
- At the Memorial Tower, Woodbridge, Ontario, Canada
- Type: Heavy field gun
- Place of origin: German Empire

Service history
- In service: 1915–1918
- Used by: German Empire; Bulgaria
- Wars: World War I

Production history
- Designer: Krupp
- Manufacturer: Krupp

Specifications
- Mass: 11,820 pounds (5,360 kg)
- Barrel length: 5.96 metres (19 ft 7 in) L/40
- Shell: 44.2 kilograms (97 lb)
- Caliber: 149.1 millimetres (5.87 in)
- Breech: horizontal sliding-wedge
- Carriage: box trail
- Elevation: -5° to +20°
- Traverse: 0°
- Muzzle velocity: 750 m/s (2,460 ft/s)
- Maximum firing range: 18,700 metres (20,500 yd)

The 15 cm Feldkanone L/40 in Räderlafette (40-caliber Field Gun on Wheeled Carriage) was a heavy field gun used by Germany in World War I. It was an ex-naval gun hastily adapted for land service by rigidly mounting it in a field carriage.

== History ==
The Germans were desperate for long-range artillery by 1915 and were forced to adapt a number of ex-naval guns for Army use, details of which are often lacking. The 15-cm SK L/40 (SK = Schnelladekanone or quick loading cannon) was an obsolete gun that was used as the secondary armament by pre-dreadnought battleships. It seems that there were actually two versions of this gun, one with an L/40 and the other with an L/45 barrel and the layout of the recoil mechanism differs between the two. It is not known if the designation changed depending on the barrel. The gun could not traverse on the mount and had to be fixed on a firing platform that weighed 7,450 kilograms (16,420 lb) to give it 60° of traverse. For transport purposes, it was broken down into three loads; barrel, carriage and firing platform.

While details are unclear, it seems that this gun was also adapted for land use, complete with its armored gunhouse, as the 15 cm KiSL (Kanone in Schirmlafette). It was mounted on a central pivot, which was in turn mounted on a firing platform. It was transported by rail or by road to its firing location in one piece and then offloaded onto the firing platform by crane.

It retained the Navy's (Kaiserliche Marine) semi-fixed ammunition, where one bag of powder was loaded before the brass cartridge containing the rest of the propellant and the primer.

At the final stages of the World War I at least 6 guns were ceded to Bulgaria.

== Gallery ==
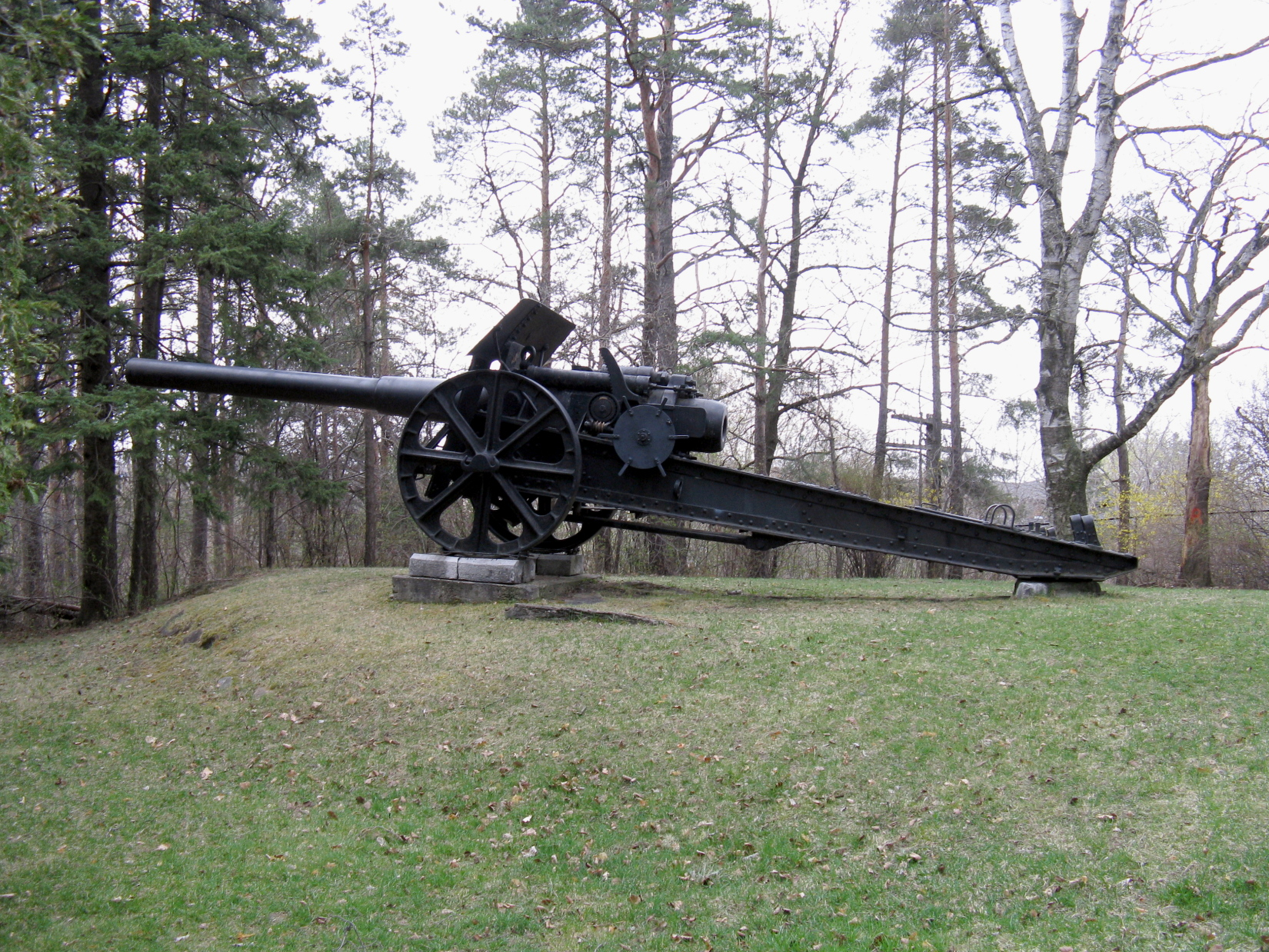
15 cm Feldkanone L/40

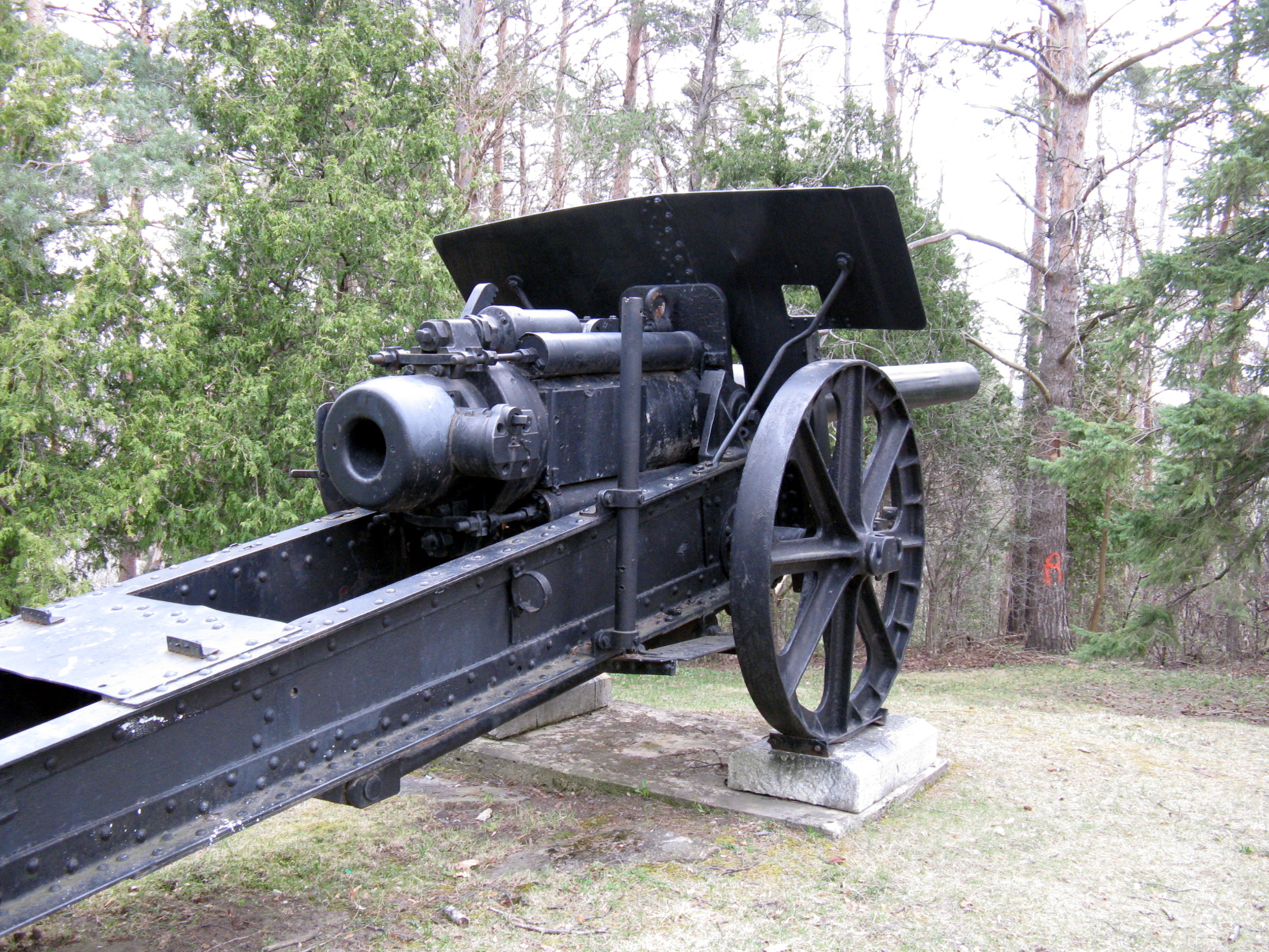
15 cm Feldkanone L/40

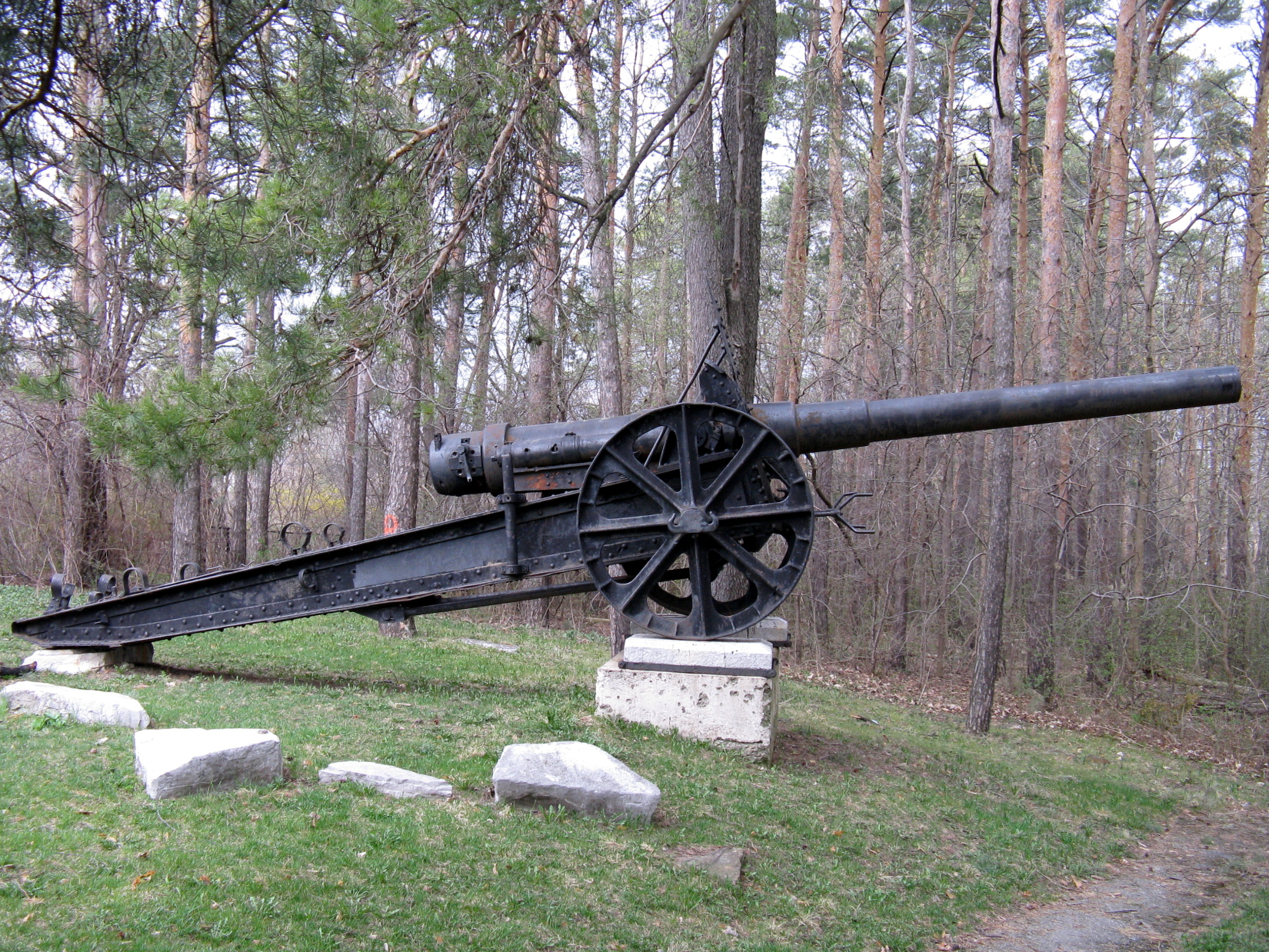
15 cm Feldkanone L/45

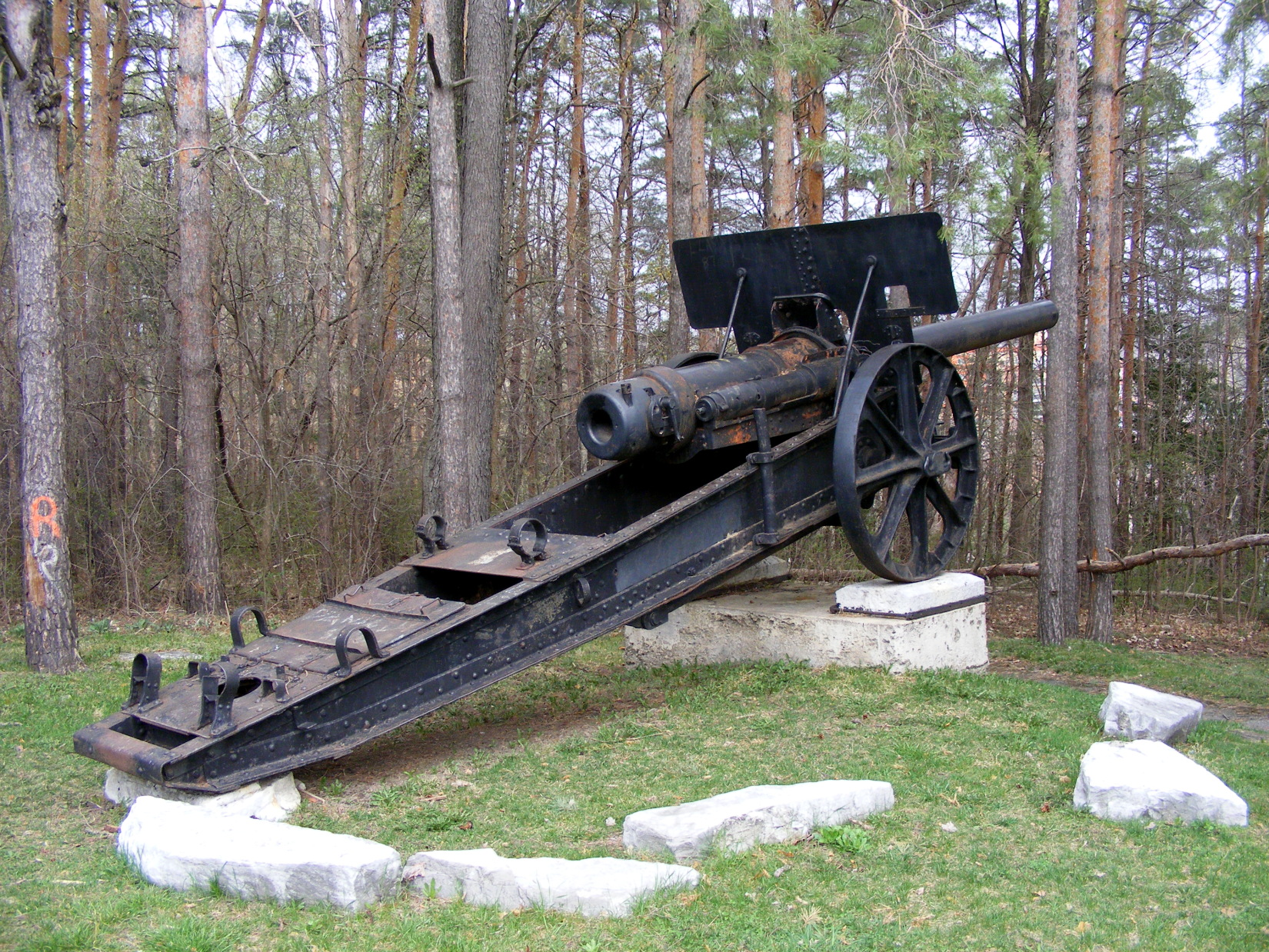
15 cm Feldkanone L/45

== See also ==
=== Weapons of comparable role, performance and era ===
- BL 6 inch Mk VII naval gun The British equivalent World War I naval gun modified for field use.
