= BL 6-inch Mk VII naval gun =

Naval and Heavy Field Gun

BL 6-inch gun Mk VII
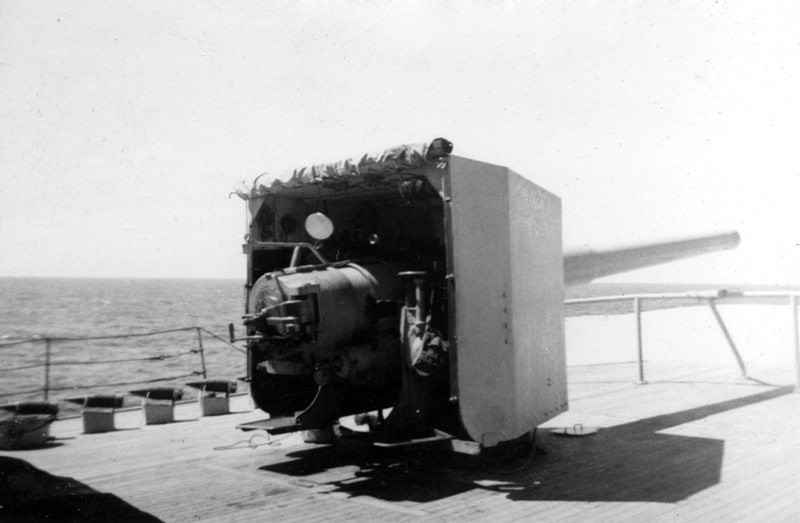
- Aboard HMCS Prince David circa 1941
- Type: Naval gun; Coastal defence gun; Heavy field gun
- Place of origin: United Kingdom

Service history
- In service: 1901–1972 (Fort Scratchley); 1915–1918 (field use); 1901–1959 (naval use)
- Wars: World War I; World War II

Production history
- Designer: Vickers
- Designed: 1899
- No. built: 898
- Variants: Mk VII, Mk VII^{v}, Mk VIII, Mk XXIV

Specifications
- Mass: 16,875 lb (7,654 kg) (gun & breech) (Note: 7 tons, 10 cwt, 2 qtrs. 19 lbs with breech fitting, including shot guide.); 25 tons (gun on field carriage)
- Length: 279.2 inches (7.09 m)
- Barrel length: 269.5 inches (6.85 m) (44.9 cal)
- Crew: 9
- Shell weight: Lyddite, HE, Shrapnel 100 lb (45 kg) (Note: Shell weights given are filled and fuzed i.e. as fired. 100 lb (45 kg) was standard shell weight in WWI. Some earlier shells had slightly higher weights e.g. Mk IV common lyddite shell weighed 101 pounds (46 kg).)
- Calibre: 6 in (152 mm)
- Breech: Welin interrupted screw
- Recoil: 16.5 in (419 mm)
- Rate of fire: 8 rpm (Note: 8 rounds per minute is the figure given by Vickers. Quoted in Brassey's Naval Annual. 1901. p. 453.)
- Muzzle velocity: 2,525 ft/s (770 m/s) (light charge); 2,775 ft/s (846 m/s) (heavy charge) (Note: 2,525 ft/s firing a 100 lb (45 kg) projectile using 23 lb (10 kg) Cordite MD size-16 propellant; 2,775 ft/s using 28 pounds 10 ounces (13.0 kg) Cordite MD size 26 was the standard naval loading in WWI. Twin mounts and unstrengthened P IV mounts were restricted to the light charge.(Treatise on Ammunition 1915) The original loading was 20 lb (9.1 kg) of the more powerful cordite Mk I size 20, but Mk I caused greater wear.)
- Maximum firing range: Field carriage Mk. II: 13,700 yd (12,500 m) (Note: (Clarke 2005, p. 23) quotes 13,700 yd (12,500 m) on the Mk II carriage; (Farndale 1986, p. 130) quotes 12,000 yd (11,000 m) – this is possibly on the Mk I carriage.); Naval: 14,600 yd (13,400 m) (light charge); 15,800 yd (14,400 m) (heavy charge) (Note: All figures for 100 lb (45 kg) shell, which was standard in WWI.)
- Filling weight: Lyddite: 13 lb 5 oz (6.0 kg); Amatol: 8 lb 14 oz (4.0 kg); Shrapnel: 874 balls @ 27/lb (Note: Figures for WWI field gun.(Hogg & Thurston 1972, p. 243))

The BL 6-inch gun Mark VII (and the related Mk VIII) (Note: Mk VII = Mark 7, Mk VIII = Mark 8. Britain used Roman numerals to denote Marks (models) of ordnance until after World War II. Mark VIII's breech opened to the left and Mark VII's opened to the right, allowing for paired mounts. Guns mounted singly were all the right-opening Mark VII) was a British naval gun dating from 1899, which was mounted on a heavy travelling carriage in 1915 for British Army service to become one of the main heavy field guns in the First World War, and also served as one of the main coast defence guns throughout the British Empire until the 1950s.

== Background ==
The gun superseded the QF six-inch gun of the 1890s, a period during which the Royal Navy had evaluated QF technology (i.e. loading propellant charges in brass cartridge cases) for all classes of guns up to 6 in (152 mm) to increase rates of fire. BL Mk VII returned to loading charges in silk bags after it was determined that with new single-action breech mechanisms a six-inch BL gun could be loaded, a vent tube inserted and fired as quickly as a QF six-inch gun. Cordite charges in silk bags stored for a BL gun were also considered to represent a considerable saving in weight and magazine space compared to the bulky brass QF cartridge cases.

== Naval gun ==
The gun was introduced on the Formidable-class battleships of 1898 (commissioned September 1901) and went on to equip many capital ships, cruisers, monitors, and smaller ships such as the Insect-class gunboat which served throughout World War II.

The Mk VIII in naval service was identical to the Mk VII, except that the breech opened to the left instead of to the right, for use as the left gun in twin turrets.

In World War II the gun was used to arm British troop ships and armed merchant cruisers, including HMS Rawalpindi, which briefly fought the German 11 in (280 mm)-gunned battleships Scharnhorst and Gneisenau in November 1939, and HMS Jervis Bay, which similarly sacrificed herself to save her convoy from the 11 in (280 mm)-gunned cruiser Admiral Scheer in November 1940.

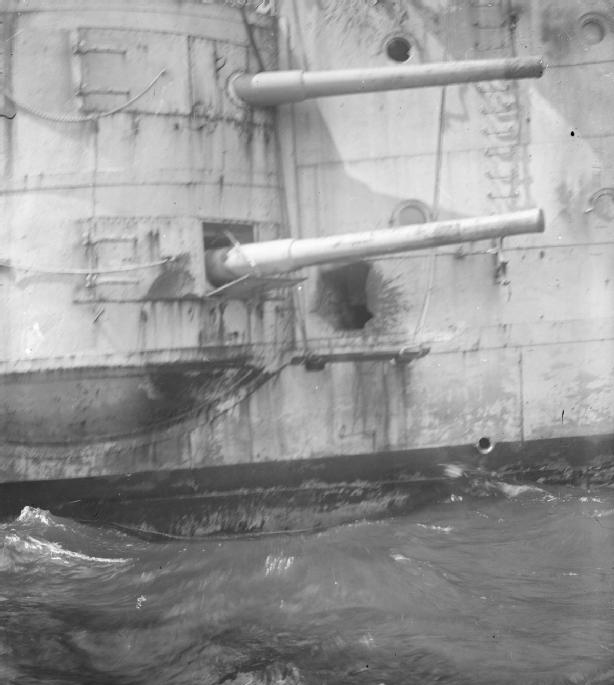
Casemate guns on HMS Kent showing shell damage from the Battle of the Falkland Islands

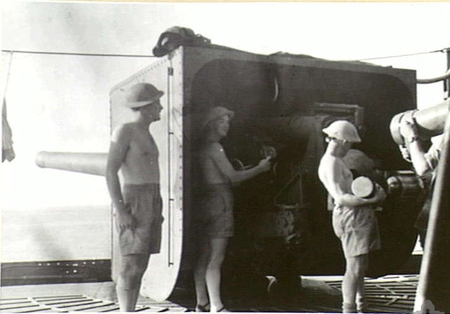
Gun drill on the troop ship RMS Laconia during World War II

== World War I field gun ==
The Mk VII gun was first used as a field gun in France in 1915. It was initially mounted on an improvised rectangular-frame field carriage designed by Admiral Percy Scott. The carriage was based on a design he had improvised for the 4.7-inch gun in the Second Boer War. It was a successful carriage, except that it limited the elevation and hence the range. A better carriage which allowed elevation to 22°, the MK II, was introduced early in 1916. This was followed by Mk III, V and VI carriages. The gun was operated by the Royal Garrison Artillery in batteries of four, as were all the larger field guns in World War I.

Following a successful deployment in the Battle of the Somme, the role of the gun was defined as counter-battery fire. They "were most effective for neutralising defences and for wire cutting with fuze 106 (a new fuze which reliably burst instantly above ground on even slight contact, instead of forming craters)". They were also effective for long-range fire against "targets in depth". The Mk VII was superseded by the lighter and longer-range BL 6-inch gun Mk XIX which was introduced from October 1916, but the Mk VII remained in service to the end of World War I.

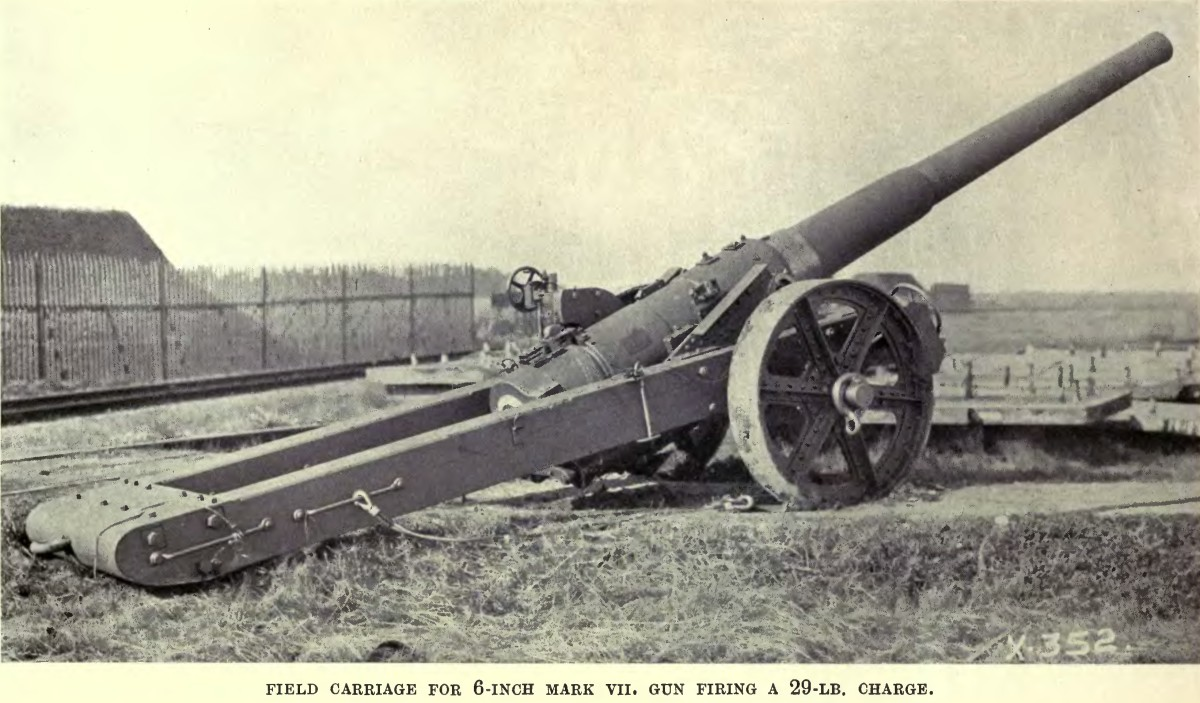
Original Percy Scott field carriage

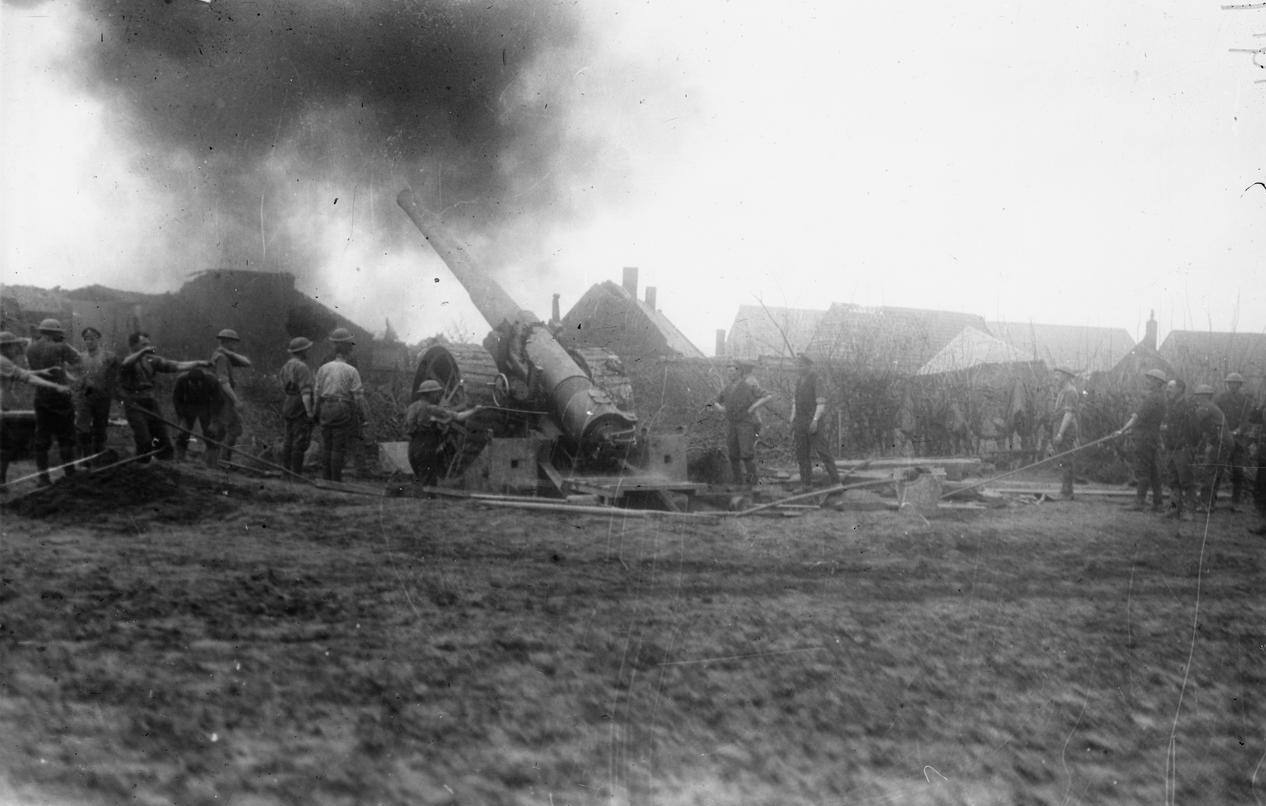
Firing near Beaumetz-lès-Loges, cutting wire for the Australian advance Second Battle of Bullecourt

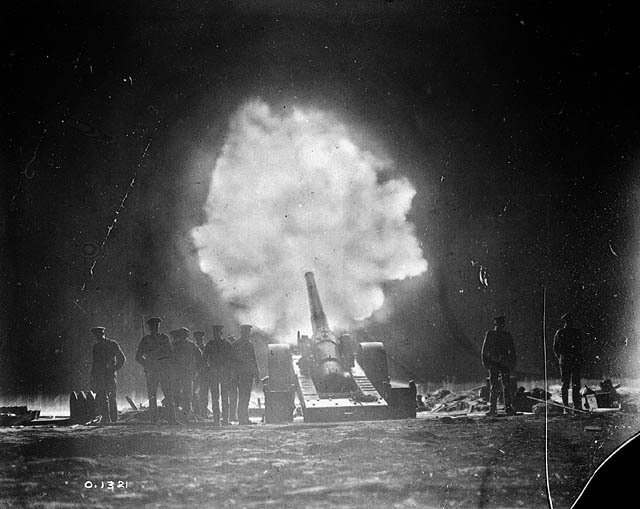
Night firing at Vimy Ridge

== Coast defence gun ==
The 6-inch Mk VII gun, together with the 9.2-inch Mk X gun, provided the main coast defence throughout the British Empire, from the early 1900s until the abolition of coast artillery in the 1950s. Many guns were specially built for army coast defence use, and following the decommissioning of many obsolete cruisers and battleships after World War I, their 6-inch Mk VII guns were also recycled for coast defence. During World War I, 103 of these guns were in service in coastal defences around the UK. Some of these, together with others at ports around the wider British Empire, played an important defence role in World War II and remained in service until the 1950s.

A number of new similar guns with stronger barrels which allowed more powerful cordite charges to be used were manufactured for coast defence during World War II, and were designated 6-inch BL Mark XXIV.

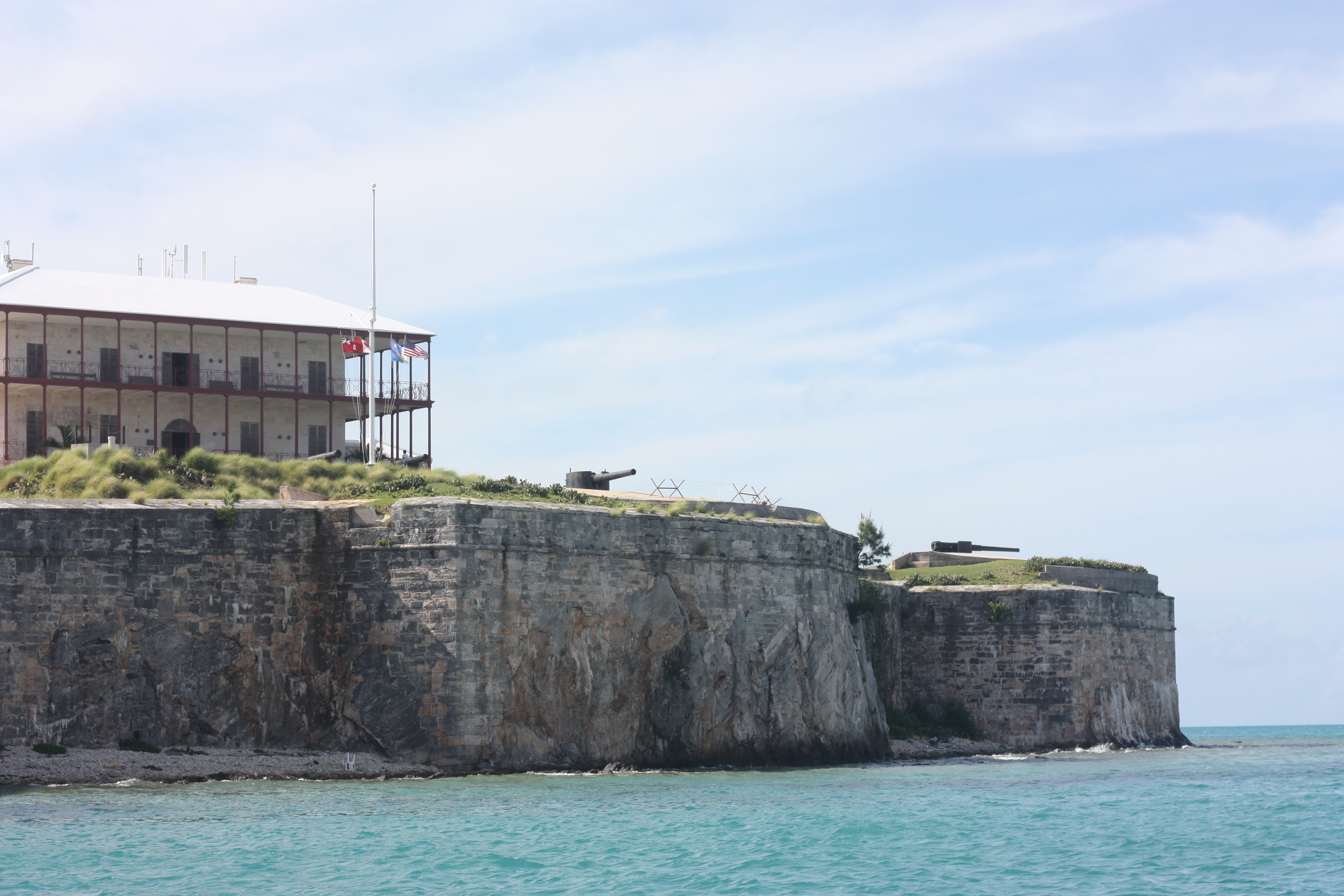
Bastions C and D of the Keep at the Royal Naval Dockyard on Ireland Island, Bermuda, with 6-inch Mk VIIs

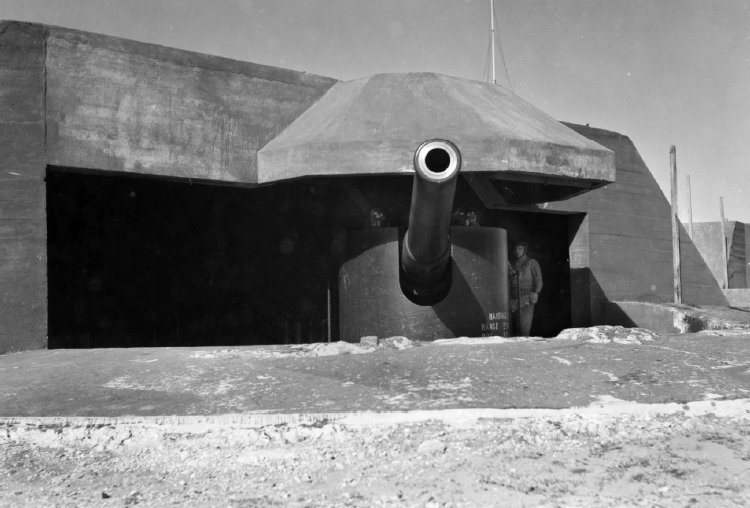
Mk VII with a concrete hood at Fort Nepean in 1943

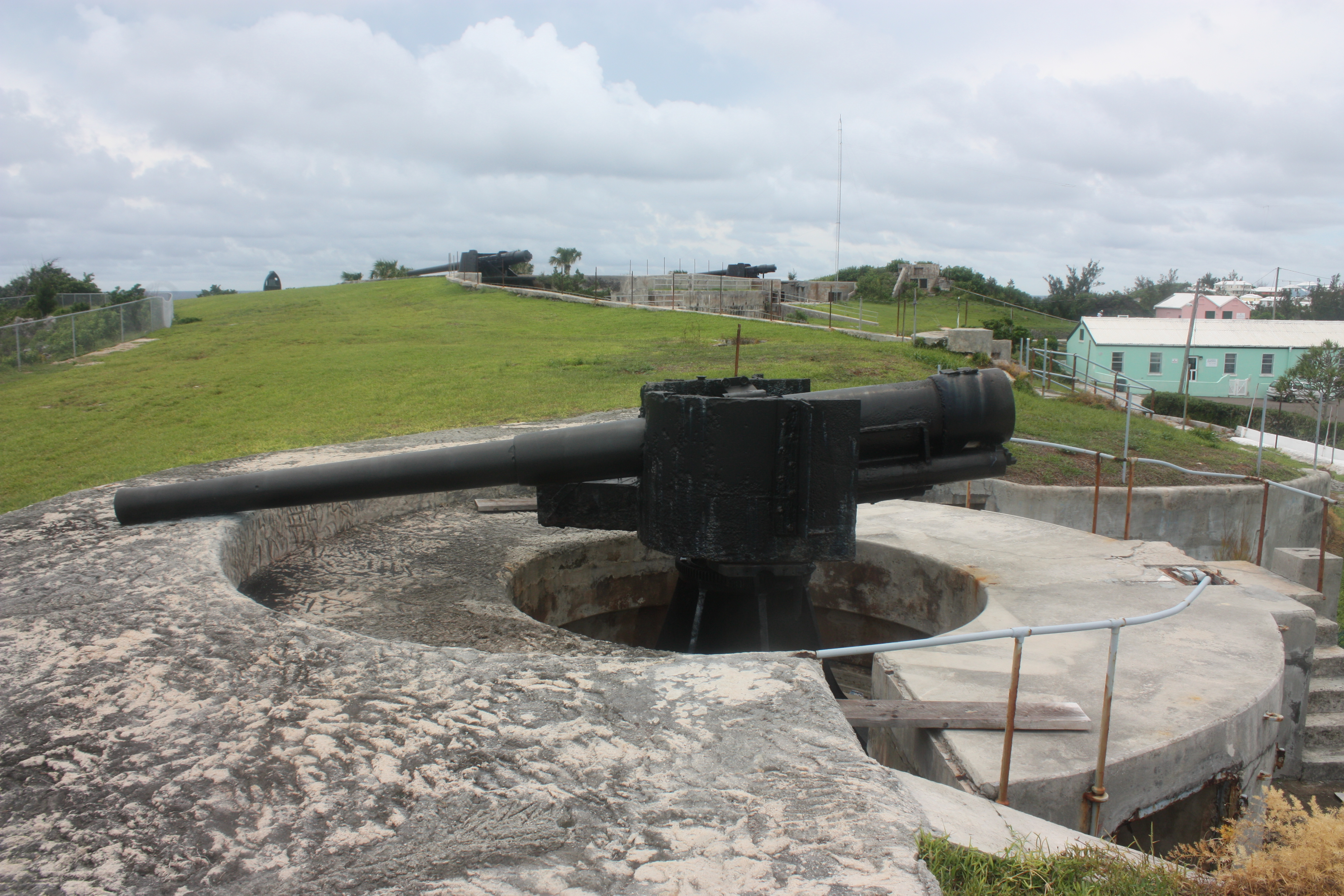
One of two 6-inch Mk VIIs, and two 9.2-inch Mk Xs, at St. David's Battery, Bermuda, in 2011

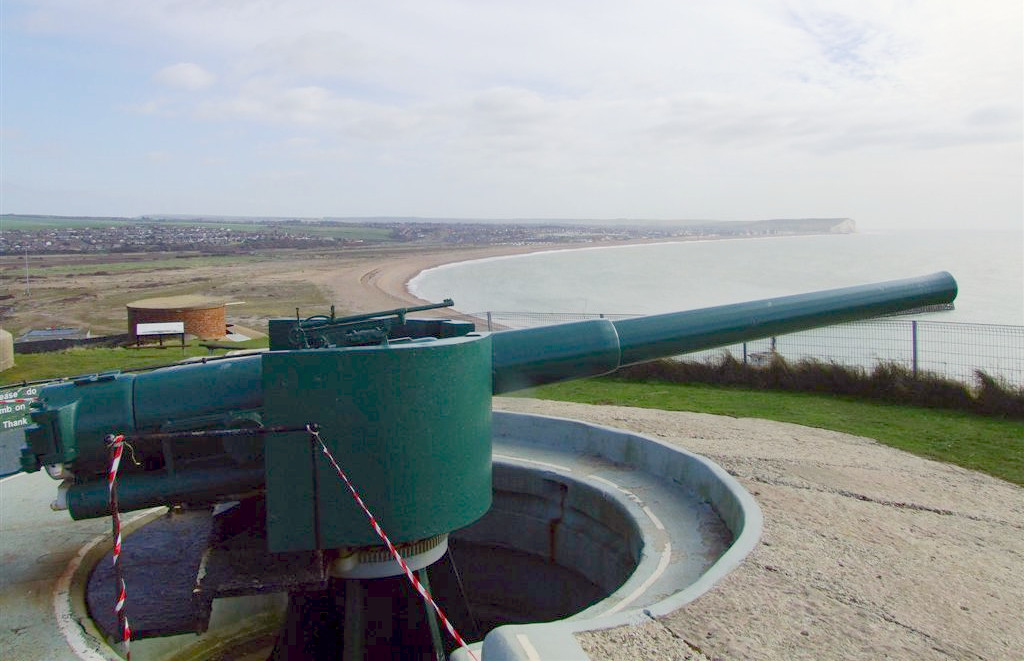
Mk VII gun on typical coast mounting at Newhaven Fort

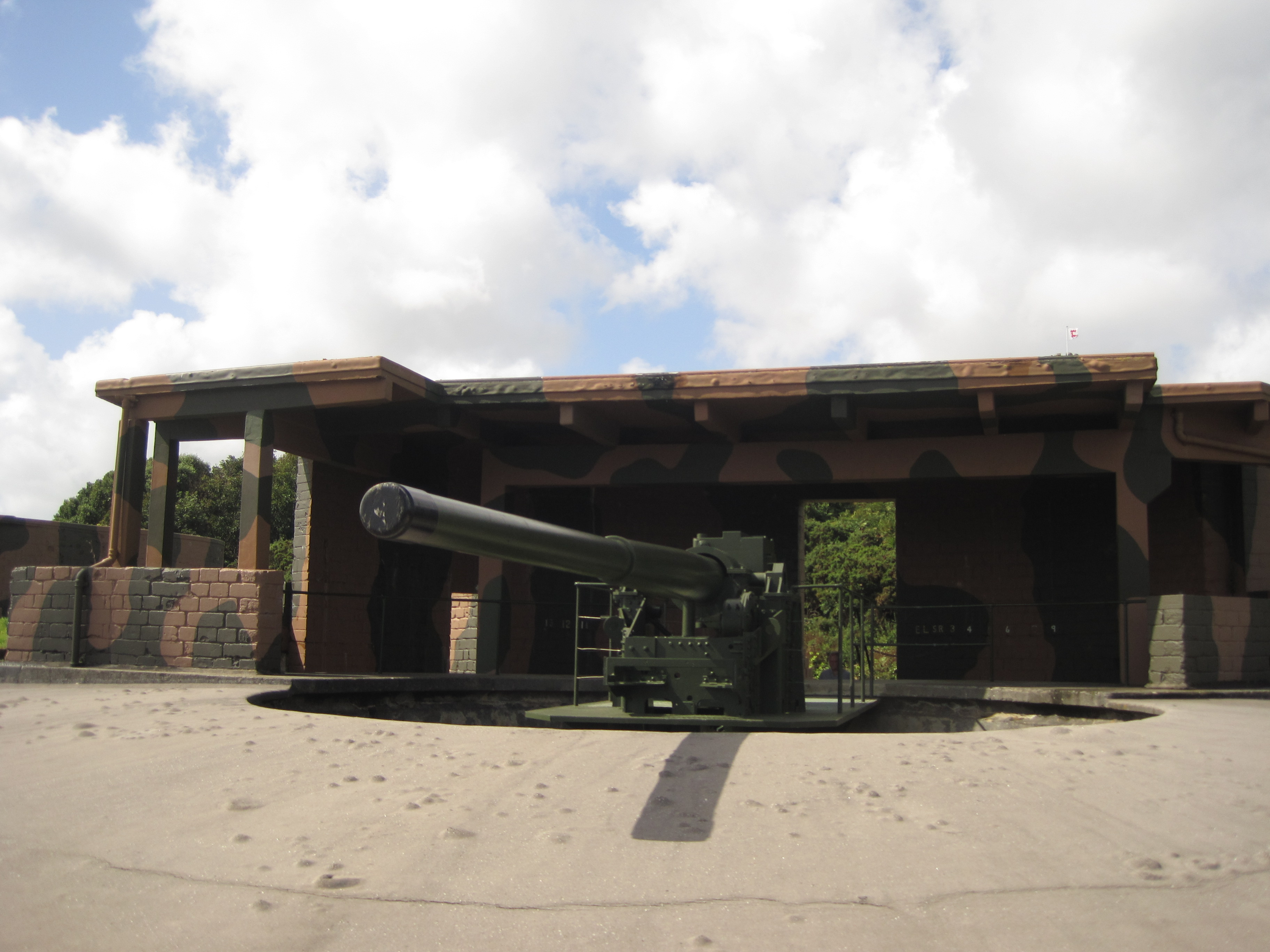
A Mk XXIV gun at Half Moon Battery Pendennis Castle.

== Notable actions ==
In the German raid on Scarborough, Hartlepool and Whitby on 16 December 1914, a notable action was fought by the Durham Royal Garrison Artillery of the Territorial Force at Heugh (two guns) and Lighthouse (one gun) batteries defending Hartlepool. They duelled with the German battlecruisers Seydlitz and Moltke (11 in (280 mm) guns) and Blücher (8.2 in (210 mm)), firing 112 rounds and scoring seven hits. The battlecruisers fired a total of 1,150 rounds at the town and the batteries, causing 112 civilians and seven military killed.

== World War I ammunition ==
Mk III 23 lb (10 kg) Cordite MD Cartridge	Mk IV Common lyddite shell	Mk VIIA Common lyddite naval shell	MK XIIA QNT Common lyddite naval shell with night tracer	Mk IX Shrapnel shell	Mk XVI HE shell

== Surviving examples ==
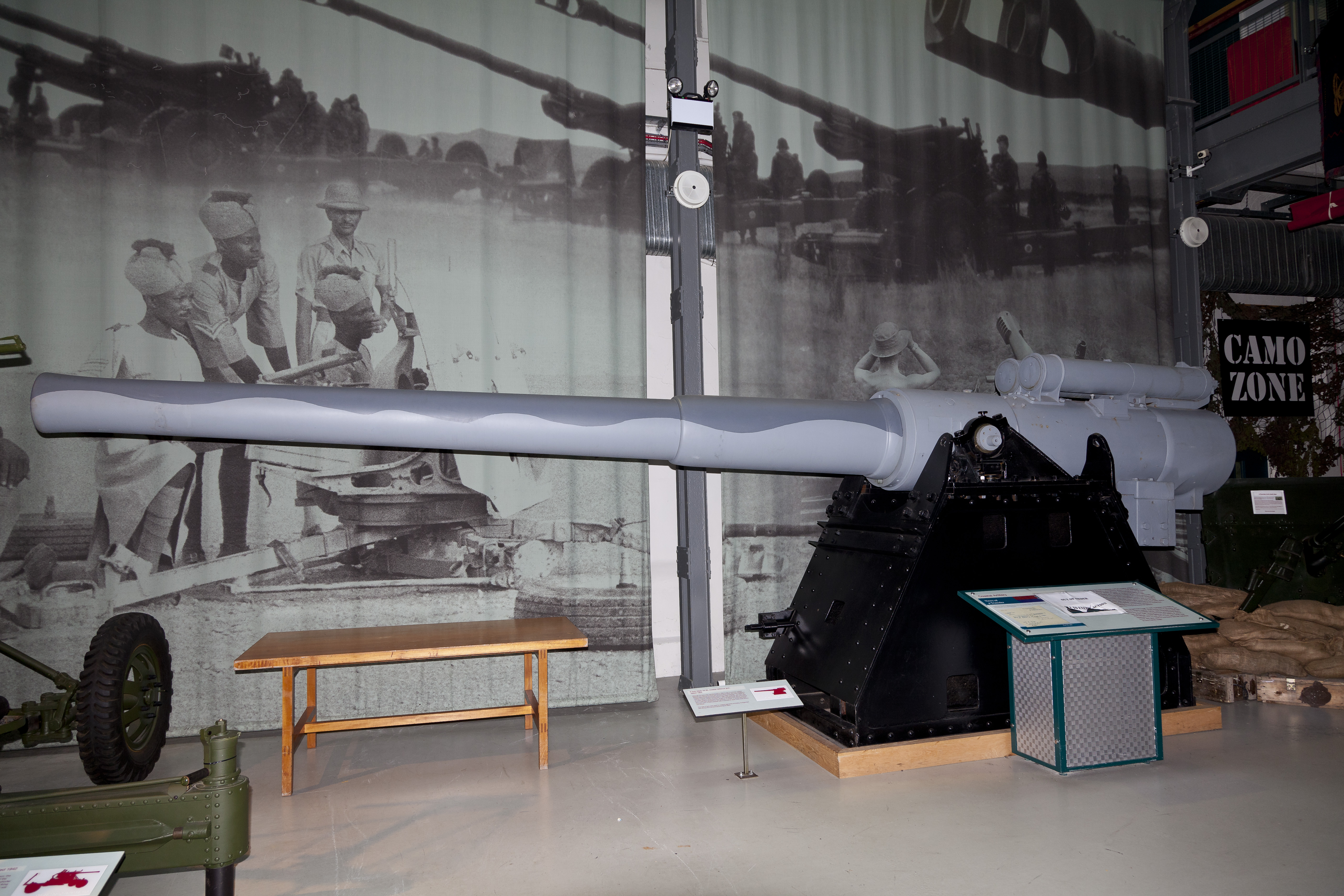
At the Royal Artillery Museum, London

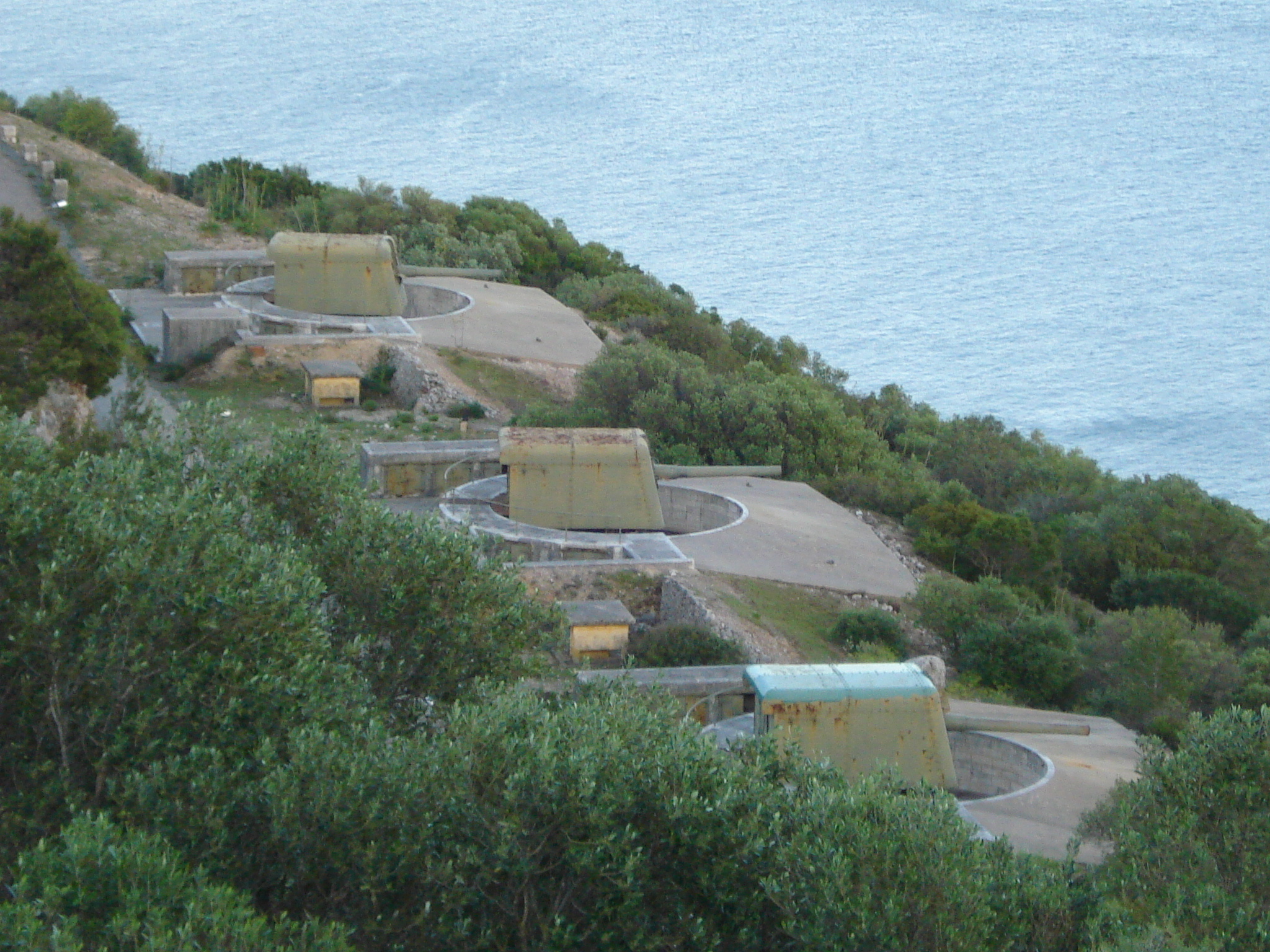
7th Coastal Artillery Battery (Portugal)

- At the Royal Artillery Museum Woolwich, London.
- A coast defence gun at Newhaven Fort, Sussex, UK
- A gun mounted on the 1904 coast defence emplacement at New Tavern Fort, Gravesend, UK
- 2 coast defence Mk 7 guns at Fort Dunree, Lough Swilly, in County Donegal, Ireland
- St. David's Battery, St. David's Head, St. David's Island, Bermuda. Two Mk VII RBLs, built by Vickers, on central pivot Mk II mounts.
- Fort St. Catherine's, St. George's Island, Bermuda 6-inch BL gun Mk VII, built by Vickers, on central pivot Mk II mount.
- Warwick Camp, Warwick, Bermuda. Two Mk. VII, built by Vickers, on central pivot Mk II mounts. (This is an active military base, and the battery is not accessible by the public. Consequently, both guns, with their mounts, were removed in 2010 and taken to Alexandra Battery for remounting for display as the armament had been removed from that battery, which is accessible to the public. Another pair of 6-inch BL gun Mk VII guns had also been removed from nearby Fort Cunningham on Paget's Island).
- Royal Naval Dockyard, Ireland Island, Bermuda. Two Mk VII (L/1029 and RGF) on central pivot Mk II, at Bastions C and D of the Keep (fortress) which houses the Bermuda Maritime Museum (there is also one BL 6-inch gun Mk II and one BL 6-inch gun Mk IV, at Bastion E).
- Fort Scratchley, Newcastle, New South Wales, Australia. 2 guns dating from 1911. Decommissioned in 1965 and placed in a nearby park. Moved back to their original mounts in 1978 after the Fort became a museum. Both were restored in 1992 by the Fort Scratchley Historical Society and are capable of being fired on special occasions for ceremonial and saluting purposes.
- A gun on field carriage at The Front Museum, Lappohja, Finland
- Fort Ogilvie, Point Pleasant Park, Halifax, Nova Scotia
- VSM gun No. 1553 dated 1901 at Princess Royal Fortress, Albany, Western Australia. Obtained from Bermuda during restoration of the site in the 1980s.
- Barrel 1489 which fired the first Australian shot of WWI, and 1317 which fired the first Australian shot of WWII at Fort Nepean, Victoria
- Mk VII gun dated 1902 at Ile aux Aigrettes, Mauritius
- Momi, Vuda, Batteries, Viti Levu, Fiji Islands. One of the barrels is #1266 from 1900
- Fort Mitchell, Spike Island, Ireland, 2 Mk VII Guns in casemates on central pivot Mk II mounts in good condition and in the process of being restored to full working condition.
- Lonehort Battery, Bere Island, County Cork, Ireland- Two 6-inch BL guns are extant- Breech blocks are missing and the guns themselves somewhat rusty, but otherwise appear to be in good condition. The fort was open to the public on 14 and 15 March 2014 for an underground art experience titled "Nest", which took place in the shell rooms below the guns. The shell rooms and hoists are also in good condition.
- Coastal Artillery Battery at Outão, Portugal on the mouth of Sado river, protecting Setubal harbour with 3 guns decommissioned in 1998
- Two guns dated 1900 and 1902 from HMS Lancaster at Canopus Hill near Stanley Airport, the Falkland Islands, they were refurbished in 2003.
- Three Mk VII (dating 1904, 1914 and 1918) of the Ostenburg battery at the Royal Naval Dockyard, Trincomalee.
- Three Mk VII of the Modara battery at the Rock House Army Camp.
- Two Mk VII at Banana, on the Atlantic coast of the Democratic Republic of the Congo. They are out of use since 1960.
- One Mk VII taken from Singapore and moved to Tinian as part of a battery of three such weapons, now sits outside the Tinian International airport. This gun fired on the battleship USS Colorado and destroyer USS Norman Scott, on 24 July 1944, causing extensive casualties and damage to both vessels. This surviving weapon bears two distinct gouges on its barrel from American return fire that knocked it out, but is otherwise intact.

== See also ==
- List of field guns
- List of naval guns

=== Weapons of comparable role, performance and era ===
- 15 cm L/40 Feldkanone i.R.: German naval gun deployed as field gun in World War I
- 6-inch/50-caliber gun – contemporary US Navy weapon, used on ships circa 1900 and as coast defence in World War II
- 6-inch gun M1897 – contemporary US Army coast defence weapon, used as a field gun in World War I

== Bibliography ==
- Handbook for The 6-Inch Breech Loading Mark XII Gun (PDF). Admiralty, Gunnery Branch, G. 21117/17. 1917.
- Treatise on Ammunition (PDF) (10th ed.). War Office. 1915.
- Clarke, Dale (2005). British Artillery 1914–1919. Heavy Artillery. Oxford UK: Osprey Publishing. ISBN 978-1-84176-788-8. Archived from the original on 21 October 2006.
- Farndale, Martin (1986). History of the Royal Regiment of Artillery. Western Front, 1914–18. London: Royal Artillery Institution. ISBN 978-1-870114-00-4.
- Farndale, Martin (1988). History of the Royal Regiment of Artillery. The Forgotten Fronts and the Home Base, 1914–18. London: Royal Artillery Institution. ISBN 978-1-870114-05-9.
- Hogg, I.V. & Thurston, L.F. (1972). British Artillery Weapons & Ammunition 1914–1918. London: Ian Allan. ISBN 978-0-7110-0381-1.
