= Rock House Army Camp =

Military base in Sri Lanka

- Colombo, Western Province

Site information
- Type: Military Base
- Controlled by: Sri Lanka Army

Location
- Coordinates: 6.96074°N 79.861°E

Site history
- In use: 1940's – present

Garrison information
- Garrison: Sri Lanka Armoured Corps

Rock House Army Camp is a military base located at Modera, north of Colombo in the Western Province of Sri Lanka. It serves as the regimental headquarters of the Sri Lanka Armoured Corps of Sri Lanka Army.

== History ==
The base gains its name from the Rock House, a stately home built in the nineteenth century by Henry Augustus Marshall, an Englishman who accompanied Lord North who was the first British Governor of Ceylon. Marshall was an officer in the Ceylon Civil Service and went on to serve as Auditor General of Ceylon. He built Rock House in addition to his other houses Whist Bungalow and Modera House. Later it became the residence of Sir William Coke, the Chief Justice of Ceylon.

The estate was taken over by the British Army and the Modera battery of three BL 6 inch Mk VII naval guns within casemates and with individual underground ammunition stores, with a Fire control tower and concrete quarters that were built for the gun crews. The Modera battery made up the northern sector of the coastal artillery batteries deployed for the defence of the Colombo harbor. With the outbreak of World War II, the coastal batteries in Colombo were manned by the 1st Coast Regiment, Ceylon Garrison Artillery. The base was occupied by the Ceylon Artillery of the newly formed Ceylon Army after Ceylon gained independence in 1948. In 1957 the 1st Reconnaissance Squadron moved in and was made a full recce regiment in 1958. There by the 1st Reconnaissance Regiment became the first unit of the Ceylon Armoured Corps. In 1962, the coastal artillery were decommissioned and the Ceylon Armoured Corps took over the base from the Ceylon Artillery which moved out. Since the 1960s the unit provided armored units for the defence of the capital in crisis situations and civil unrest.

== See also ==
- Sri Lanka Armoured Corps
