= Lawrence Cove =

Coordinates: 51°38′N 9°49′W

Lawrence Cove is a sheltered inlet on the north side of Bere Island, West Cork, Ireland, to the west of the village of Rerrin.

One of Bere Island's ferry services operates from there. It is also the location of a yachting marina, and formerly the location of a British Army facility. Lawrence Cove Marina provides winter boat storage facilities, and there is also a craft shop at the marina. Nearby Rerrin village has a pub, a shop, and post office.
