= Rerrin =

Village on Bere Island, County Cork, Ireland

Rerrin Raerainn
- Village
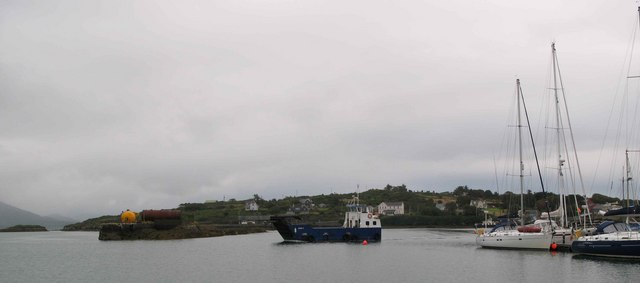
- Rerrin, Bere Island

- Location in Ireland
- Coordinates: 51°38′03″N 09°49′07″W
- Country: Ireland
- Province: Munster
- County: County Cork

Area
  - Total: 1.18 km^{2} (0.46 sq mi)
- Time zone: UTC+0 (WET)
  - Summer (DST): UTC-1 (IST (WEST))

Rerrin (Irish: Raerainn) is the main village on Bere Island, within County Cork in Ireland. The village is located on the north of the island and is next to the sheltered mooring of Lawrence Cove. It is also the name of the townland surrounding the village. Historical records list Rurryne in the Calendar of Patent Rolls of James I dated 1611.

== Location and amenities ==
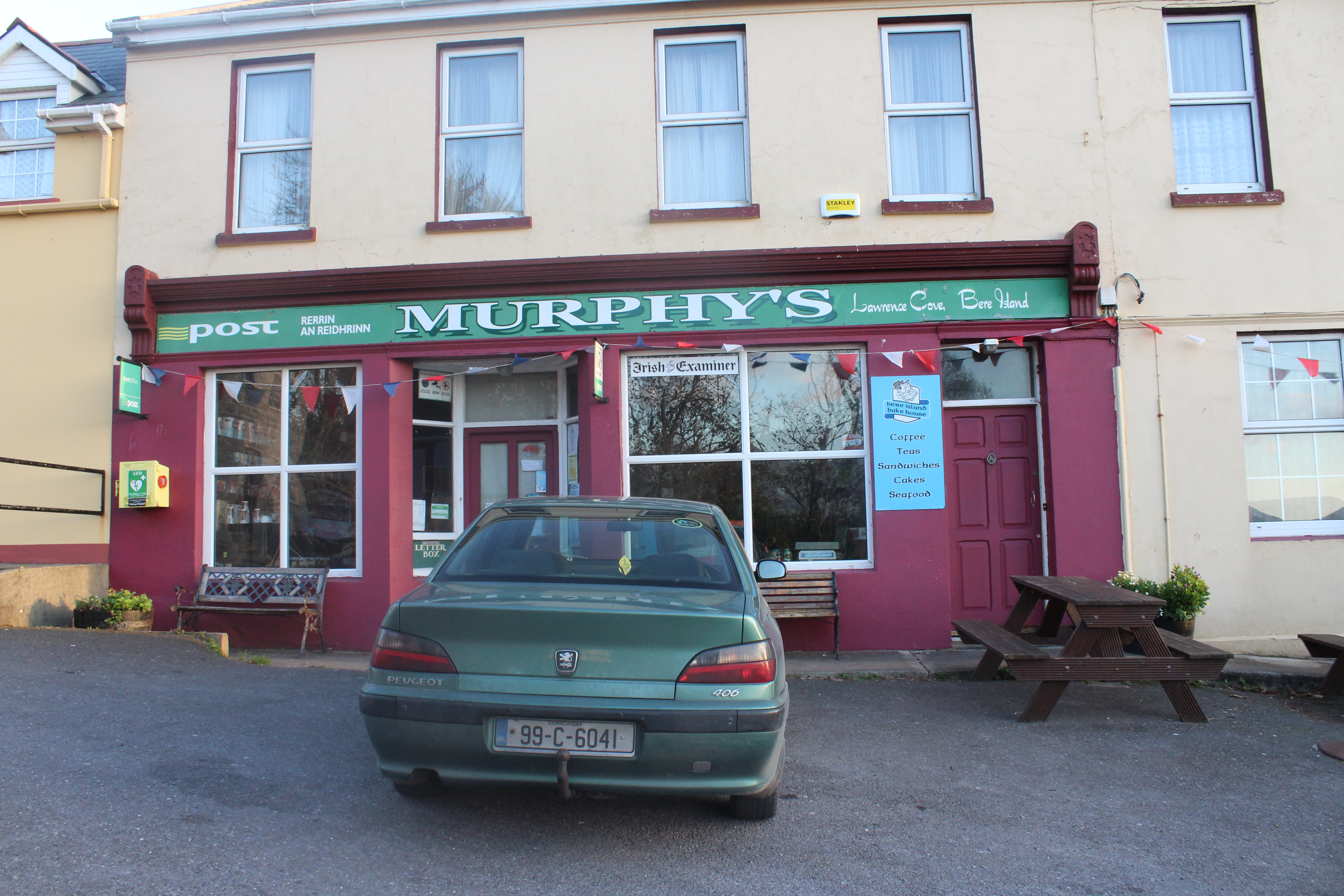
Rerrin post office

The village of Rerrin on Bere Island extends from the harbour to the military buildings at the top of the hill. The military buildings are remnants of the island's long connection with the British military which valued Bere Island's strategic position in Bantry Bay. Rerrin has a pub, a general store/post office and a coffee shop/restaurant. It also has a ferry service to the mainland.

== See also ==
- List of towns and villages in Ireland
