= Duleep Wickramanayake =

Sri Lanka Army general

Major General Duleep Wickramanayake
- Born: September 5, 1930
- Died: September 29, 2017 (aged 87)
- Military career
- Allegiance: Sri Lanka
- Branch: Sri Lanka Army
- Service years: 1950–1985
- Rank: Major General
- Unit: Sri Lanka Artillery
- Commands: Southern Command, South Eastern Command, Army Training Centre, 4th Field Regiment, Ceylon Corps of Military Police
- Conflicts: 1971 JVP insurrection, Sri Lankan Civil War

Major General Duleep Justin De Sliva Wickramanayake (5 September 1930 – 29 September 2017) was a general of the Sri Lanka Army. He served as the director operations and training of the Sri Lanka Army.

Born in Colombo, Wickramanayake was educated at Ananda Balika Primary School and at Ananda College, Colombo, where he played for the college cricket team and became a sergeant in the college cadet platoon. Joining the Ceylon Army in 1950, he received his training at Mons Officer Cadet School, Aldershot and at Royal Military Academy, Sandhurst. On his return he was commissioned as a second lieutenant in the Ceylon Artillery on 7 February 1952. He was promoted to lieutenant on 7 August 1953, captain on 1 October 1956 and major on 30 January 1962. During this time he attended the young officers course at the Royal School of Artillery, the anti-air craft course at the School of Anti-Aircraft Artillery, Monorbier, the infantry instructors course at the Army Recruit Training Depot, Diyatalawa. Having attended the Army Command and Staff Course at Staff College, Australia he served as SO 11, Army Force – Panagoda and GSO 11 (Training), Army Headquarters. Promoted to lieutenant colonel on 1 November 1969, he then served as the officiating commanding officer, Ceylon Corps of Military Police before becoming commanding officer, 4th Field Regiment Ceylon Artillery in July 1970 and served till January 1973. During the 1971 JVP insurrection, he served as the coordinating officer for the Matara District and thereafter Kurunegala District conducting counterinsurgency operations. He then served as aide de camp to the president of Sri Lanka before taking up command of the South Eastern Command, having been promoted to the rank of colonel on 1 January 1974. Having attended the Royal College of Defence Studies, he served as officiating commandant, Army Training Centre; commander, Southern Command; director personnel administration and director operations and training at Army Headquarters. Having retired from the army, he was promoted to the rank of major general on 19 September 1985. His awards include the Republic of Sri Lanka Armed Services Medal, Sri Lanka Army 25th Anniversary Medal, Ceylon Armed Services Long Service Medal, President's Inauguration Medal and the Ceylon Armed Services Inauguration Medal.

== Death ==
Major General D.J De S Wickramanayake (Rtd) died in Australia on 29 September 2017.
