= Larry Wijeratne =

Sri Lanka army officer

Major General Larry Wijeratne USP
- Born: 1950
- Died: 14 May 1998 (aged 47–48); Jaffna, Sri Lanka
- Military career
- Allegiance: Sri Lanka
- Branch: Sri Lanka Army
- Rank: Major General
- Unit: Sri Lanka Artillery
- Commands: Commanding Officer 51-4 Brigade
- Conflicts: 1971 Insurrection; Insurrection 1987-89; Sri Lankan Civil War
- Awards: Uttama Seva Padakkama; Desha Putra Sammanaya

Major General Larry A.R. Wijeratne USP, SLA (1950 – 14 May 1998) was the former Brigade Commander of 532 Brigade based in Jaffna.

== Early life and family ==
He completed his education at Nugawela Central College. At school, he excelled in both studies, sports alike and was a Queen's Scout. His wife was Brigadier Indira Wijeratne of the Sri Lanka Army Legal Branch and he was the father of two sons, Bhagya and Dulanjaya.

== Career ==
After leaving school he joined the army as an officer cadet and was commissioned as a Second Lieutenant in the Sri Lanka Artillery. During his career he held many positions within the army including that of instructor at the Army Training Centre, Diyatalawa (now the Sri Lanka Military Academy). He had been awarded the Uttama Seva Padakkama, Sri Lanka Armed Services Long Service Medal, North and East Operations Medal, Purna Bhumi Padakkama, Operation Wadamarachchi Medal, Riviresa Campaign Services Medal, and 50th Independence Anniversary Commemoration Medal for his service during the course of his military career.

Brigadier Larry Wijeratne was appointed as commanding officer of 51-4 Brigade at Vadamarachchi in Jaffna in 1997.

== Death ==
On the last day of his duty assignment he was killed by an LTTE suicide bomber at Velvetiturai in Jaffna on 14 May 1998, when he attended a Jaffna traders' felicitation lunch just before leaving on transfer as deputy commandant of the Kotelawela Defence Academy. Brigadier Larry Wijeratne was posthumously promoted to the rank of Major General.
