= Bere Island =

Island in County Cork, Ireland

Bere / Bear
Native name: An tOileán Mór Oileán Béarra
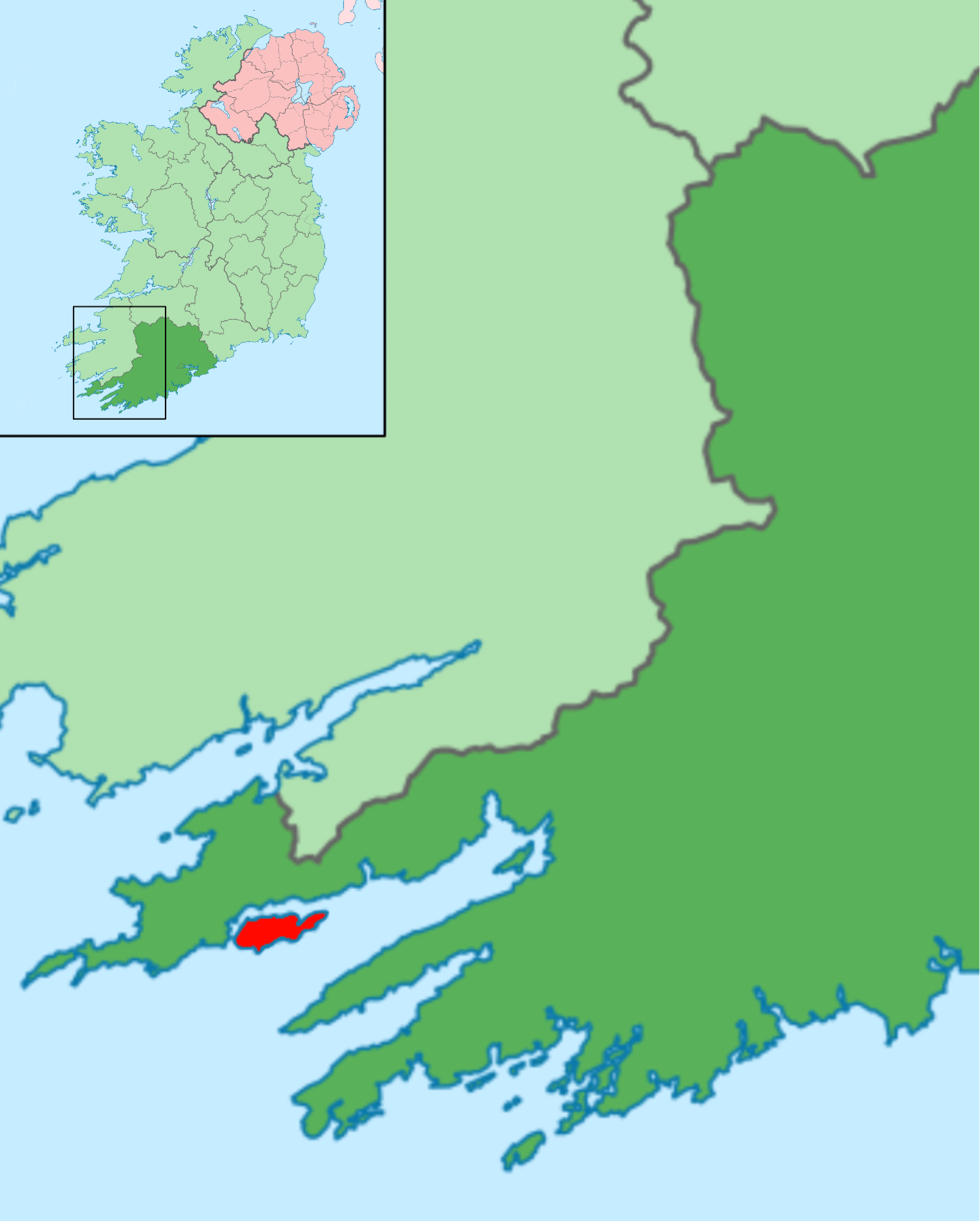
- A map of Bere Island within Ireland

- Location within island of Ireland

Geography
- Location: Bantry Bay
- Coordinates: 51°38′N 9°53′W
- Area: 17.68 km^{2} (6.83 sq mi)
- Length: 10.1 km (6.28 mi)
- Width: 2.9 km (1.8 mi)
- Highest elevation: 270 m (890 ft)
- Highest point: Knockanallig

Administration
- Ireland
- County: County Cork
- Largest settlement: Rerrin

Demographics
- Population: 218 (2022)
- Ethnic groups: Irish

Bere Island or Bear Island (Irish: Oileán Béarra, although officially called An tOileán Mór meaning "the big island") is an island in Bantry Bay off the Beara Peninsula in County Cork, Ireland. It spans roughly 10 km x 3 km, with an area of 17.68 km^{2} and, as of the 2022 census, had a population of 218 people.

Legend says that the island was named by a 2nd-century king of Munster, Mogh Nuadat, in honour of his wife, Beara, the daughter of Heber Mór, King of Castile.

== History ==
Early traces of human occupation include megalithic tombs and standing stones. The island was the property of the O'Sullivan Bere clan and remained so until the power of the Gaelic chieftains was finally broken in 1602. This period also saw the first military interest in the island when Sir George Carew ordered a road to be built across the island to transport troops to participate in the siege of Dunboy.

In December 1796, a French Navy fleet entered Bantry Bay and Berehaven Harbour, led by Lazare Hoche under the direction of Wolfe Tone, the leader of the Society of United Irishmen. The French longboat which landed in Bere Island is now in the National Museum of Ireland. Adverse winds prevented the main force landing and eventually caused the fleet to disperse and return home. In August 1798, there was a further invasion attempt, at Killala in County Mayo, following the Irish Rebellion of 1798. The result of these events was that the Dublin Castle administration reviewed their defensive plans and in 1803, with the country once again at war with France, Lieutenant-Colonel William Twiss was sent to Ireland to draw up a plan of defence for the country. As part of this review he was directed to examine what security could be given to Bantry Bay.

Rear-Admiral Sir Robert Calder, who commanded the Royal Navy squadron based in Castletownbere Port, wrote to William Wickham on 22 December 1803 to request protection for his victualers and store ships, which were to be based at the Berehaven anchorage to supply his squadron. Wickham agreed that protection for the ships was necessary and instructed William Cathcart, 1st Earl Cathcart to order his engineers to carry out works to build Martello Towers on the island. The Bere Island towers were reported as ready on 2 February 1805 and were therefore probably among the earliest Martello Towers to be completed in Ireland. The four, all circular in shape and built of rubble masonry, were sited to defend the anchorage between the mainland and the small harbour of Lawrence Cove on Bere Island. In addition to the Martello Towers, a signal tower, a barracks for 2 officers and 150 men, a quay and storehouses were also constructed. After the end of the Napoleonic Wars there followed a period of military stagnation. This ended in 1898 when the Dublin Castle administration issued a compulsory purchase order on large areas of the island in order to construct additional fortifications to protect the Royal Navy ships at anchor in Berehaven Harbour. These were the Lonehort Battery, Ardaragh Battery, and numerous other naval artillery batteries on the eastern side of the island.

During the Irish War of Independence, some Irish Republican Army prisoners were interned on Bere Island, including Canon William Kennedy, head (from 1919 to 1932) of St Flannan's College, Ennis. In 1922, under the terms of the Anglo-Irish Treaty that ended the war, the British withdrew from most of Ireland but three deep water Treaty Ports, at Berehaven, Queenstown (renamed Cobh), and Lough Swilly, were retained as sovereign bases until 1938.

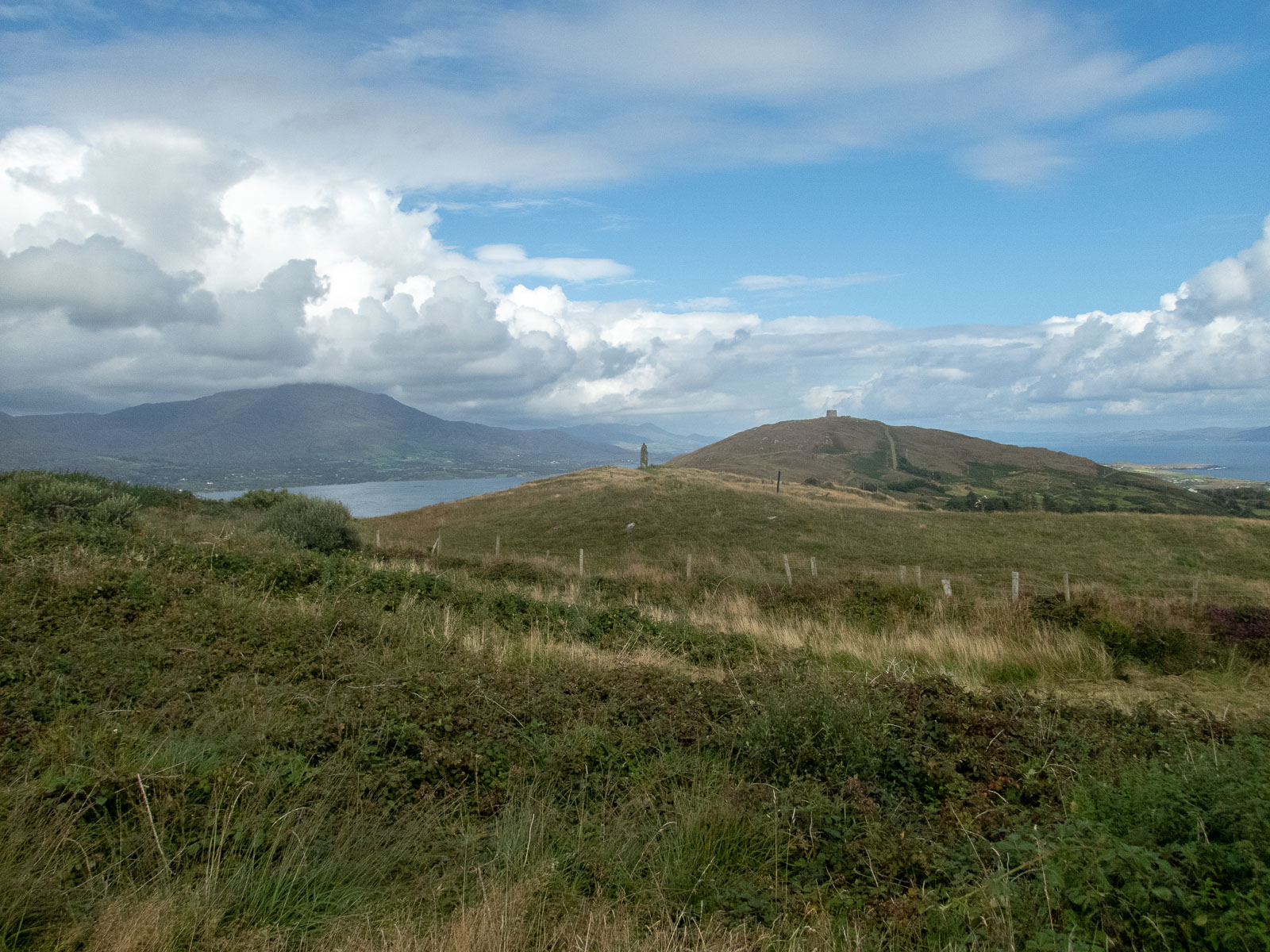
View across Bere Island, with standing stone and Martello tower in the distance

=== Archaeological and historic sites ===
Evidence of more ancient settlement on the island include the remains of a circular enclosure (at Greenane), a hut site (Ardaragh West), a promontory fort, a ringfort (at Cloonaghlin West, Greenane), a collapsed wedge tomb (Ardaragh West), and standing stone (at Greenane).

Ruins and remains relating to the island's military history include the remains of an artillery battery (Ardaragh West, Cloonaghlin West), Martello tower (Ardaragh West, Cloonaghlin West), a telegraph station, and a signal tower (at Derrycreeveen).

=== Shipwrecks ===
The wreckage of the Bardini Reefer lies just north of the island. It sank on 12 December 1982 after burning for several days.

== Geography ==
=== Location ===
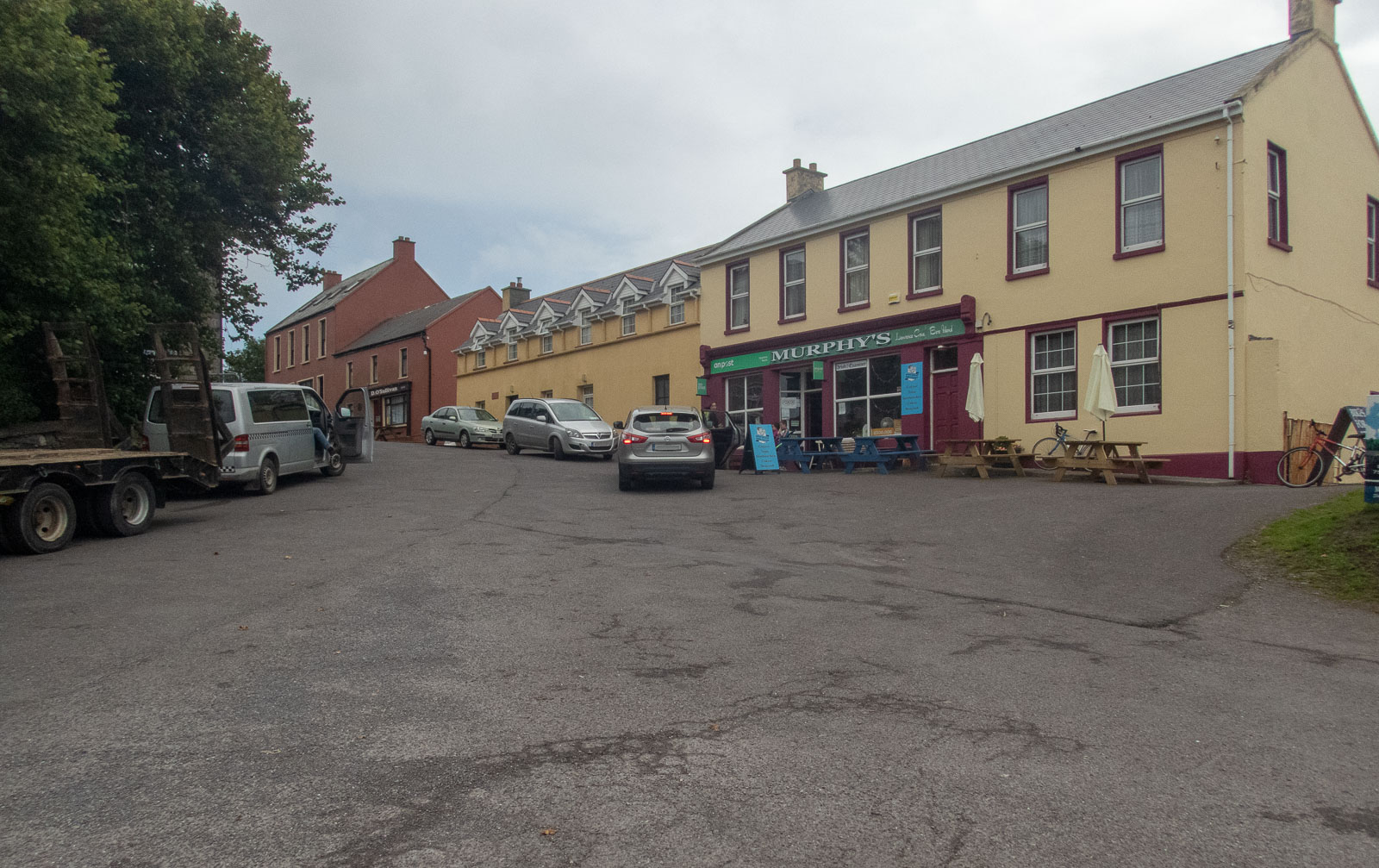
Rerrin is the main village centre on the island

The island is located between Berehaven Harbour and Bantry Bay in the western part of County Cork, about 1.5 km off the port of Castletownbere. It belongs to the civil parish of Killaconenagh (Cill Eacha Naoineach) in the barony of Bear. The highest point on the island is Knockanallig, at a height of 270 metres. The main harbour is Lawrence Cove, near the main village of Rerrin (Raerainn), toward the eastern end of the island. The church and its graveyard are located in Ballinakilla.

=== Subdivisions ===
Ten of the 75 townlands of the civil parish of Killaconenagh are located on the island. These include Ardra West, Ardra East, Ballinakilla (with St Michael's Roman Catholic church and graveyard and nearby pub), Cloonaghlin West, Cloonaghlin Upper, Cloonaghlin Lower, Derrycreeveen, Greenane, Ardagh and Rerrin.

== Infrastructure ==
=== Transport ===
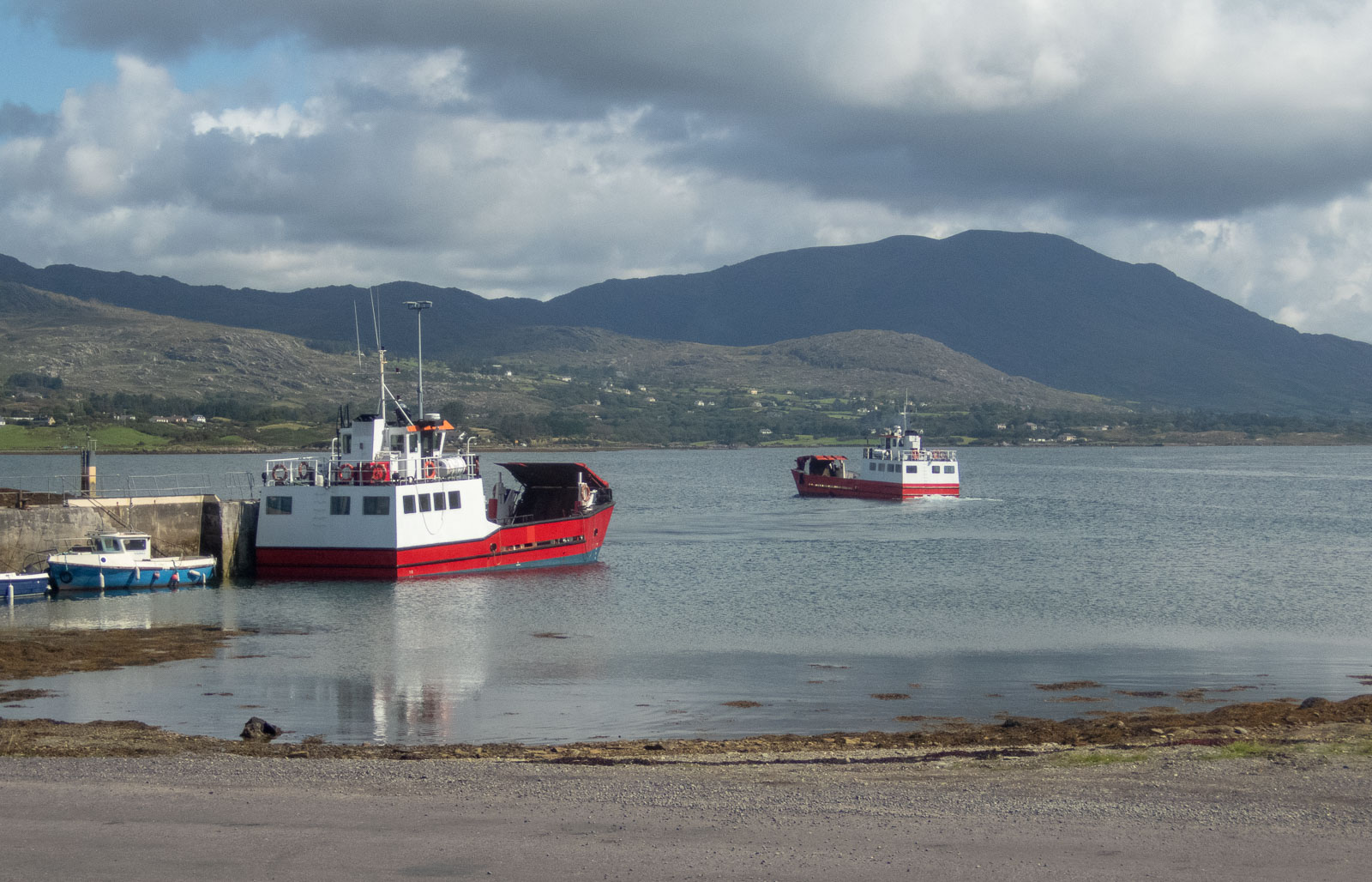
Bere Island ferry

The island is served by two ferries both of which can carry light vehicles. One sails between Castletownbere and the west of the Island while the other serves Pontoon (a pier about 2 km east of Castletownbere along the R572) and Rerrin village.

During the COVID-19 pandemic in Ireland, in conjunction with other "isolation" efforts, the island's ferry services were curtailed, with only residents permitted to board in order to prevent the virus from reaching the island.

=== Energy ===
Work started on providing mains electricity to the island via submarine cable in July 1957 and was completed in April 1958.

=== Local radio ===
A local radio station broadcasts for a few hours on Sundays from a small transmitter on the island on 100.1 MHz FM.

== Demographics ==
As of 2022, the population is 218. As of the mid-19th century, the population was significantly higher, with the 1841 census indicating a population of 2,122 people. However, by the 1851 census the population had decreased to 1,454 due to the Great Famine. The population decline continued in line with the national trend for emigration throughout the 19th and 20th centuries. Unlike many of the other islands off the Irish coast, the inhabitants of Bere Island were speakers of English and Irish according to a sample of the 1911 census.

Historical population

Year	Pop.	±%
1841	2,122	—
1851	1,454	−31.5%
1861	1,158	−20.4%
1871	1,125	−2.8%
1881	1,075	−4.4%
1891	967	−10.0%
1901	1,059	+9.5%
1911	1,028	−2.9%
1926	1,182	+15.0%

Year	Pop.	±%
1936	1,001	−15.3%
1946	783	−21.8%
1951	534	−31.8%
1956	493	−7.7%
1961	382	−22.5%
1966	306	−19.9%
1971	288	−5.9%
1979	258	−10.4%
1981	252	−2.3%

Year	Pop.	±%
1986	230	−8.7%
1991	216	−6.1%
1996	212	−1.9%
2002	207	−2.4%
2006	187	−9.7%
2011	216	+15.5%
2016	167	−22.7%
2022	218	+30.5%

Source: Central Statistics Office. "CNA17: Population by Off Shore Island, Sex and Year". CSO.ie.

== Notable people ==
Former or current residents of the island have included:

- Michel Houellebecq (born 1956), French author, known for his novels, poems, and essays.

== See also ==
- List of Irish military installations
- List of townlands of the barony of Bear
