= Infantry Training Centre (Sri Lanka Army) =

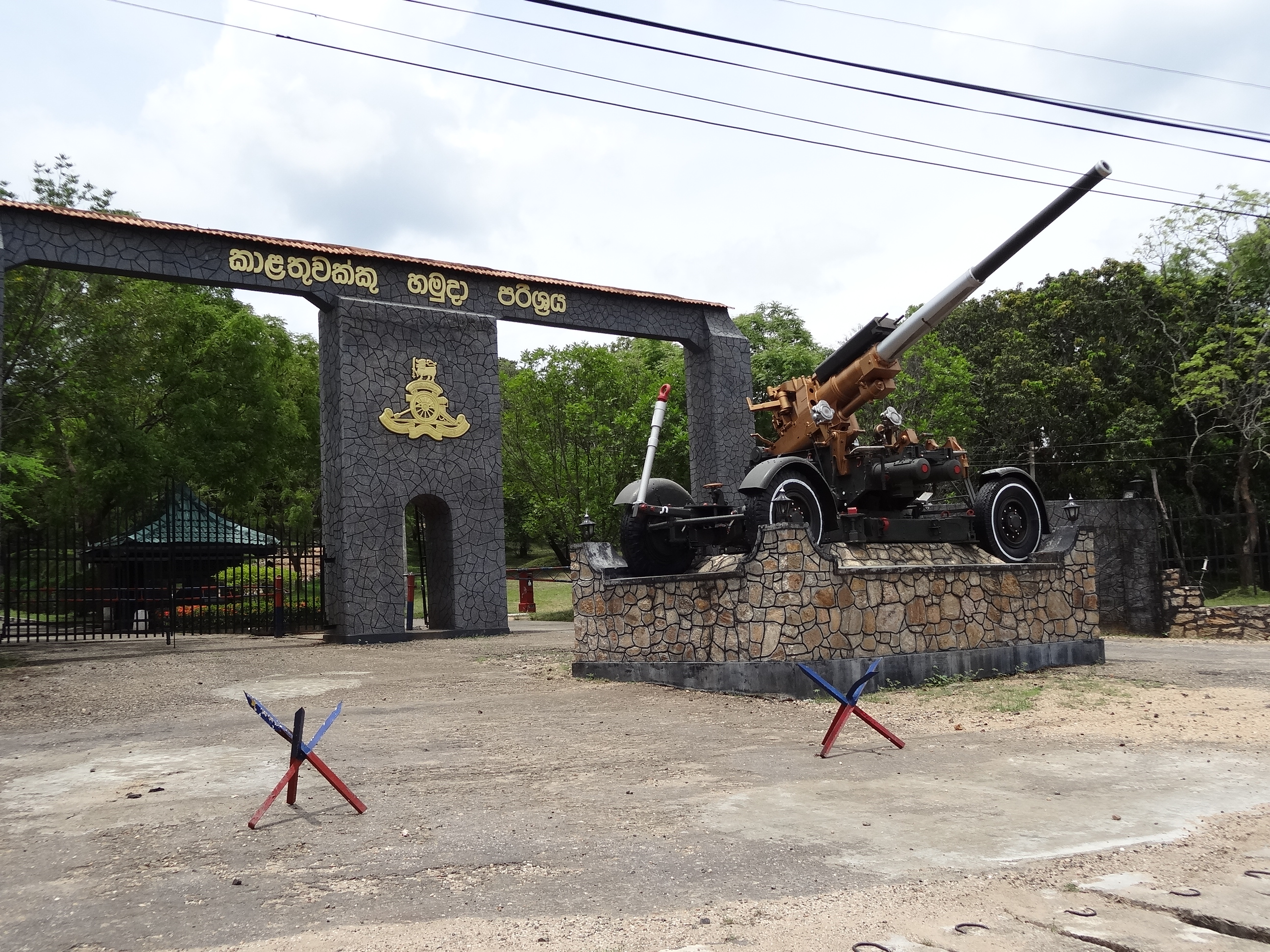
- Active: 1984-Present
- Country: Sri Lanka
- Branch: Sri Lanka Army
- Type: Training
- Role: Infantry Training
- Size: One Battalion
- Part of: Army Training Command
- Garrison/HQ: Minneriya
- Motto(s): "Follow me"

The Infantry Training Centre (ITC) (Sinhala: පාබල පුහුණු මධ්‍යස්ථානය, romanized: pābala puhuṇu madhyasthānaya) is a unit of the Sri Lanka Army responsible for both basic and advanced training of Soldiers and Officers joining the infantry. It is based in Minneriya it was established in 1984.

== Courses ==
- Young officers course (weapons)
- Battalion support weapons course - officers
- Battalion support weapon course - other ranks
- Senior non commissioned officers tactics course
- Non commissioned officers tactics course
- Mortar platoon course
- Directly enlisted officers course
