= Modara =

Modara මෝදර முகத்துவாரம்
- Suburb
- Location within Colombo District Location within Sri Lanka
- Coordinates: 6°57′34″N 79°52′31″E
- Country: Sri Lanka
- Province: Western Province
- District: Colombo District
- Time zone: UTC+5:30 (Sri Lanka Standard Time Zone)
- Postal Code: 01500

Modara (Sinhala: මෝදර, romanized: Mōdara; Tamil: முகத்துவாரம், romanized: Mukattuvāram), also known as Mutwal (anglicised version), is a municipal ward of Colombo, capital of Sri Lanka. The mouth of the river Kelani Ganga also lies nearby. It is part of the postal area Colombo 15.

== See also ==
- Rock House Army Camp
