= Reinforcement Regiment =

A Reinforcement Regiment (RTF) in the Sri Lanka Army is an operational regiment of armoured or infantry units. These were created to support the rapid expansion of the army during the Sri Lankan Civil War.
