= Lonehort Battery =

Coastal artillery fort on Bere Island, County Cork, Ireland

Coordinates: 51.6420°N 9.7907°W

The water on the left side of the photo is part of Bantry Bay, which connects to Berehaven Harbour. to the right is the Lonehort Battery, still fenced off since it is still military property.

The Lonehort Battery is a British fortification located on Bere Island, just outside of Berehaven Harbour, County Cork, Ireland. The battery is the largest fortification on Bere Island and was built to guard the critical harbour of Castletownbere. The battery is located on the eastern end of the island. The purpose of the battery was to guard the British fleet which usually lay at anchor in Berehaven harbour.

== Construction ==
The British Army had maintained a military presence on Bere Island since 1797, but they really became interested in fortifying the island in the late 1890s as their dreadnoughts and Home Fleet ships began using Berehaven harbour. In 1898, the War Office purchased the eastern end of Bere Island for the defense of Berehaven harbour. Construction began shortly after the land purchase, and in 1899, the moat and some basic structures of the battery were completed. Both the British Royal Engineers and locals worked on constructing the battery. The ammunition was stored beneath the guns, in brick vaults.

The moat that surrounds the Lonehort Battery; Off on the far right is a rare wooden dummy gun used to train gun crews.

The Lonehort Battery was armed with 2 Mark VII 6in RBL cannons and 1 Mark X 9.2in gun, all in open-air barbettes. The Mark X was a favorite of British naval defenses such as Malta and Gibraltar. The gun could launch a shell up to 16 mi. The Mark VII was also a staple of British naval defenses, being used from the mid-1880s till 1956. The Lonehort Battery was surrounded by a 15-foot deep moat that stretches for over a mile around the battery. The battery was built to be self-sufficient, so it was built with a forge, well, kitchen, generators, and a barracks area. The generators also powered the nearby Ardaragh Battery and numerous spotlight positions located along the shoreline. Access to the battery was controlled by a bridge that could be retracted into the battery. A wooden “Loading Teacher” 6in gun was installed at the Lonehort Battery to train the new crews on how to fire the guns. The wooden gun is one of only a few left in the world. The Lonehort Battery is one of only a handful of British fortifications from this time period that was left intact, with most being renovated during World War II.

== History ==
During World War I, the Lonehort Battery was garrisoned by British troops who guarded one of the main harbours in which many convoys heading or coming from America stopped. After the war, the battery was still operated by British authorities even after the establishment of the Irish Free State in 1922. Berehaven was one of 3 “Treaty Ports” that Britain was allowed to operate out of. The harbour of Berehaven and its defenses, including the Lonehort Battery, were handed over to the Irish Army's Coastal Defence Artillery in 1938. The battery was manned 24/7 during World War II to protect the harbour from foreign intrusions, both British and German. The battery was manned continuously until 1947, and since it has only been periodically garrisoned. Occasionally the battery is used for Irish military maneuvers. The site is still owned by the Department of Defence, although there have been plans to turn the site into a tourist attraction. Occasionally, you can request a tour of the Lonehort Battery.
