= Minneriya =

Minneriya මින්නේරිය
- Location within Sri Lanka
- Coordinates: 8.03°N 80.90°E
- Country: Sri Lanka
- Province: North Central

Minneriya (Sinhala: මින්නේරිය) is a small town in Sri Lanka that is famous for two things — the great Minneriya lake built by King Mahasen and Minneriya National Park which is a hot spot for safari lovers because of its abundance of elephants. Furthermore, it is near the tourist-friendly Habarana and the world heritage sites Anuradhapura, Polonnaruwa and Sigiriya.

The area is home to the Infantry Training Centre as well as a training centre of the Military Police of the Sri Lanka Army. The 6th Artillery Regiment is based at Minneriya along with the SLAF base SLAF Hingurakgoda.
