= List of equipment of the Sri Lanka Navy =

This is a list of equipment of the Sri Lanka Navy, the naval warfare branch of the Sri Lanka Armed Forces.

Sri Lanka Navy personnel with assault rifles

== Shipboard weapon systems ==
Weapon	Photo	Origin	Notes	Ref.
Naval artilleries
EMGEPRON 47 mm		(Brazil)	Used for ceremonial gun salutes	
Oto Melara 76 mm		(Italy)		
PJ33A dual 100 mm		(China)		
Autocannons
CRN 91		(India)		
M242 Bushmaster		(United States)	Chain-fed autocannon	
Mk44 Bushmaster II		(United States)	Chain-fed autocannon	
Rheinmetall Mk 20 Rh-202		(West Germany)		
Remote weapon systems
Typhoon		(Israel)		
Anti aircraft guns
Bofors 40 mm		(Sweden)		
Type 58		(Soviet Union)		
Type 61		(China)		
Type 76 twin 37 mm		(China)		
ZU-23-2		(Soviet Union)		
Automatic grenade launchers
Heckler & Koch GMG 40 mm		(Germany)		
Heavy machine guns (HMG)
M2 Browning		(United States)		
W85		(China)		
General-purpose machine guns (GPMG)
Type 80		(China)		
Anti-ship missiles
Gabriel		(Israel)		

== Specialized land vehicles ==
Vehicle	Photo	Origin	Notes
Mine-protected APC
Unibuffel		(Sri Lanka)	Known to be used by the Naval Patrolmen.
Unicorn		(Sri Lanka)	
Combat all-terrain vehicle (CATV)
Ideal Motors CATV		(Sri Lanka)	Introduced and handed over to the Sri Lanka Navy in early 2023.

== Rocket artillery ==
- Type 63 multiple rocket launcher

== Radar systems ==
System	Photo	Origin	Ships	Notes
Surface-search radars
AN/SPS-78		(United States)	SLNS Gajabahu	
AN/SPS-64		(United States)	SLNS Samudura	
BEL 1245		(India)	SLNS Sayura	
Decca 1226		(United Kingdom)	SLNS Sagara	Operates in the I band
Racal Decca 2459		(United Kingdom)	SLNS Sayura	
Type 360		(China)	SLNS Parakramabahu	
Fire-control systems
Mark 92 Fire Control System		(United States)	SLNS Gajabahu	
Type 345		(China)	SLNS Parakramabahu	
Over-the-horizon radars
Raytheon's HFSWR-503		(Canada)	—N/a	

== Mortars ==
- Type 84 (W84) 82 mm mortar
- Type 89 60 mm mortar

== Infantry weapons ==
Model	Photo	Origin	Variant	Caliber	Notes
Handguns
Beretta M9		(United States)	Unknown	9×19mm Parabellum	
Assault rifles
Type 56		(China)	56-2	7.62×39mm	
Type 81		(China)	Unknown	7.62×39mm	
M16		(United States)	M16A2	5.56×45mm NATO	
M4 Carbine		(United States)	Colt M4A1; Bushmaster M4-Type	5.56×45mm NATO	
QBZ-95		(China)	QBZ-95; QBZ-97	5.56×45mm NATO	
SAR 21		(Singapore)	Unknown	5.56×45mm NATO	
Submachine guns
Heckler & Koch MP5		(Germany)	Unknown	9×19mm Parabellum	
Machine guns
PKM		(Russia)	Type 80	7.62×54mmR	This variant is the Chinese version of Russian PKM
RPD		(Russia)	Type 56 LMG	7.62×39mm	This variant is the Chinese version of Russian RPD
Grenade launchers
Milkor MGL		(South Africa)	Mk1	40×46mm low-velocity grenades	
M203		(United States)	Unknown	40×46mm SR low-velocity grenades	
Rocket launchers
RPO-A Shmel		(Soviet Union)	Unknown	93 mm	Man-portable rocket launcher
Type 69 RPG		(China)	Unknown	40×46mm	This variant in the Chinese version of RPG-7 of Soviet Union

== Shore establishments ==
=== Main shore establishments ===
- SLNS Parakrama (Flagstaff Street, Colombo) – Naval Headquarters
- SLNS Lanka (Welisara) -VNF HQ
- SLNS Gemunu (Welisara) – Naval Barracks & Naval Detention Barracks
- SLNS Mahasen (Welisara) – Logistic deport
- SLNS Tissa (Trincomalee)

=== Naval bases ===
- SLN Dockyard (Trincomalee) – Eastern Naval Command HQ
- SLNS Rangalla (Colombo Harbour, Colombo) – Western Naval Command HQ
- SLNS Dakshina (Galle) – Southern Naval Command HQ
- SLNS Ruhuna (Tangalle)
- SLNS Vijaya (Kalpitiya Fort, Kalpitiya, Puttlam)
- SLNS Elara (Karainagar, Jaffna) – Northern Naval Command HQ
- SLNS Thammanna (Talaimannar)
- SLNS Uttara (Kankasanturai, Jaffna)

=== Training establishments ===
- Naval and Maritime Academy (SLN Dockyard, Trincomalee)
- SLNS Thakshila (Welisara) – Naval Institute of Technology (NIT)
- SLNS Nipuna (Boossa) – Advanced Naval Training Centre
- SLNS Shilpa (Kandy) – Naval Recruit Training Centre
- SLNS Shiksha (Poonewa) – Naval Recruit Training Centre
- SLNS Pandukabaya – Naval Recruit Training Centre/Combat Training School

=== Land based naval contingents ===
- SLNS Walagamba
- SLNS Gajaba
- SLNS Agbo (Madangal)
- SLNS Vijayaba
- SLNS Kanchadewa (Kayts and Velani)
- SLNS Velusumana (Mandathivu)
- SLNS Gotaimbara (Punguduthivu)
- SLNS Perakumba (Sampur, Trincomalee)
- SLNS Vasaba (Delft Island)
- SLNS Pussadeva (Vankalai)
- SLNS Theraputta (Shilawathura)
- SLNS Bharana (Mullikulam)

=== Harbour defence units ===
- SLNS Mahaweli (SLN Dockyard, Trincomalee)
- SLNS Kelani (Colombo Harbour, Colombo)

=== Former shore establishments ===
- HMCyS Rangalla (Diyatalawa)
- HMCyS Parakrama 2 (Trincomalee)
- HMCyS Gemunu 2 (Kochchikade, Colombo)
- HMCyS Kalaru

== External links & sources ==
- Sri Lank Navy website
