= UniAIMOV =

AIMOV
- Type: Light armoured car
- Place of origin: Sri Lanka

Service history
- In service: 2020 – present
- Used by: Sri Lanka Army

Production history
- Designer: Sri Lanka Electrical and Mechanical Engineers
- Manufacturer: Sri Lanka Electrical and Mechanical Engineers
- Produced: 2020 – present

Specifications
- Suspension: 4x4 wheeled

UniAIMOV also known as just AIMOV is a Light Armoured vehicle based on the Land Rover Defender chassis developed and manufactured by the Sri Lanka Electrical and Mechanical Engineers.

== Design ==
AIMOV is a 4x4 light armoured High-Mobility/Forward Command vehicle built on Land Rover chassis with seating for 5 including driver and operator. External racks have been added for 4-8 men to hang on easily to the vehicle during emergency exfiltration. It is protected from land mines and hand grenades. Designed to reduce crew fatigue, it is equipped with run-flat tyres, greater shielding on vital components such as engines and transmission, day-night cameras that provide 360 degree vision, VHF base station and can launch & operate short ranged drones for aerial surveillance. It is fully air conditioned for crew comfort.

The vehicle was designed mainly for urban warfare, counter-insurgency and special operations. It can also be used as a command centre for the ground commander who can maintain real time communications with HQ.

== Production history ==
External media

Images
- UniAIMOV
- AIMOV Front
- AIMOV Rear

Video
- Army's new workshop with hardware products and heavy vehicles

The UniAIMOV was first unveiled to the public in December 2020 during the opening of the SLEME Base Workshop Homagama.

== See also ==
- Unibuffel
- Unicorn APC
- Snatch Land Rover
- MDT David
