= Naval Patrolmen =

Naval Patrolmen Branch
- Active: 1987–Present
- Country: Sri Lanka
- Branch: Sri Lanka Navy
- Type: Naval Infantry
- Role: Force Protection, Amphibious Operations
- Part of: Sri Lanka Navy
- Nickname(s): The Regiment
- Motto(s): Constant Protection
- Engagements: Insurrection 1987-89; Sri Lankan Civil War

Naval Patrolmen Branch is a branch of the Sri Lanka Navy that performs the role of naval infantry. Effectively members of this branch are soldiers of the navy. Originally limited for base and harbour security, in recent years Naval Patrolmen have taken part in offensive and defensive operations against the LTTE in conjunction with the Sri Lanka Army or independently, using both infantry and light armored units. It has also taken part in amphibious operations.

== History ==
Naval personnel have been deployed on shore patrol duties on many occasions since the formation of the Royal Ceylon Navy in 1950. Regularly naval personnel were deployed to support the police to control civil disobedience along with the Army during many harthals and riots during the 1950s and 1960s. During the 1962 coup d'état attempt the internal security personnel of the navy were detailed to guard Prime Minister's House (Temple Trees). In 1971 navy personnel were deployed in various parts of the island to suppress communist insurgents during the 1971 JVP Insurrection. Since the 1970s up until the late 1980s the navy personnel guarded the Broadcasting Corporation station in Colombo.

With the escalation of the Sri Lankan Civil War and increased threat to naval bases that were launching pads for naval operations to curb LTTE sea movements, the Vice Admiral Ananda Silva, the Commander of the Navy instituted the formation of the Naval Patrolmen Branch in 1987 to carry out operations on land. This unit was formed primary as a protective force for base and port security, but increased its numbers and scope for amphibious and land combat operations. To achieve its objectives the patrolmen are equipped with light arms and have mortars, Unibuffel light armored vehicles.

Naval Patrolmen have taken part in several major combat operations alongside Army units, these include Operation Sea Breeze, Operation Balavegaya, Operation Riviresa and Operation Jayasikurui having raised to the strength of 3 battalions by 1997. Its personnel fought till the bitter end during the Battle of Pooneryn. During the last part of the civil war known as the Eelam War IV Naval Patrolmen garrisoned and defended the government controlled islands around the Jaffna Peninsula such as Delft Island and Kayts. Since 1987, the Naval Patrolmen frequently mounts guard at the Presidents House, and carry out other ceremonial duties.

== Marine battalion ==
In 2016, the Sri Lanka Navy formed its first battalion of Marines consisting of 6 officers and 158 sailors from the Naval Patrolmen branch, specializing in amphibious warfare. The unit started training under the assistance of the 11th Marine Expeditionary Unit of the United States Marine Corps in November 2016

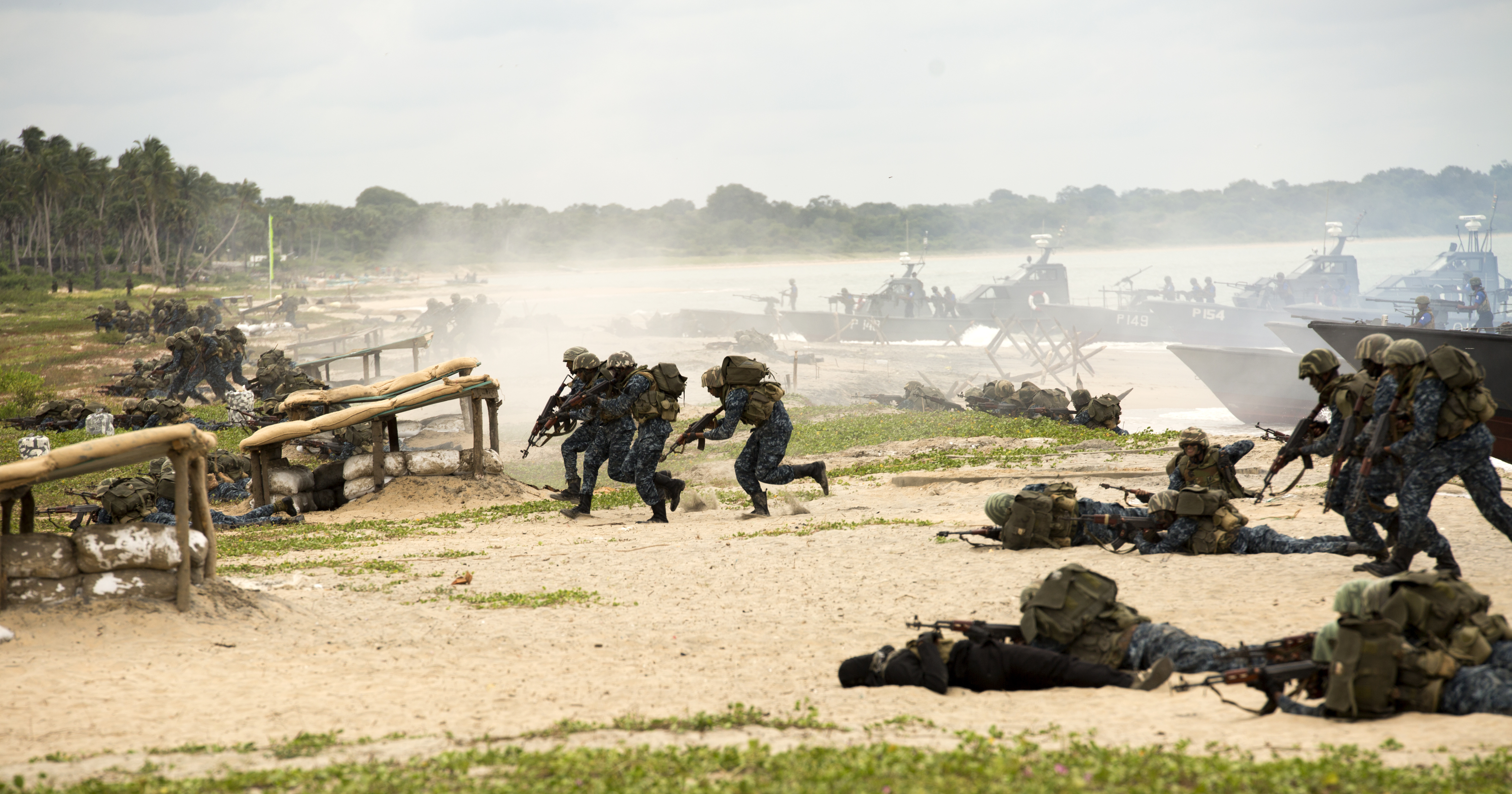
Sri Lankan Marines in an amphibious capabilities demonstration during the Sri Lanka Marine Corps Boot Camp graduation at Sri Lankan Naval Station Barana in Mullikulum, Sri Lanka, Feb. 27, 2017.

== Organisation and current role ==
Officers and patrolmen are organized into battalions based at naval bases island wide and independent detachments. All units come under the command of Director Naval Land Operations, who in turn reports to Director General (Operations), however individual units come under that command of the Naval Area Command that they belong too.

At first the primary role was harbor and base security, but increased its numbers and scope for amphibious and land combat operations. In recent years with expansion of the number of battalions, patrolmen have begun supporting the Sri Lanka Army in manning defence lines in the north central part of the country and taking part in offensive operations jointly or independently. This led to the formation of the North Central Command (which covers a landlocked area). The security of the Colombo harbor, along with all other harbors in the country is handled by the navy, as the Sri Lanka Navy is the Designated Authority for implementing International Ships and Port Facility Security (ISPS) Code in Sri Lanka. To achieve its objectives, patrolmen are equipped with light arms and have mortars and light armoured vehicles.

The unit's Training Centre is located at SLNS Pandukabaya.

== Weapons ==
Land vehicles

- Unibuffel – Mine-protected APC
- Unicorn – Mine-protected APC
- Land Rover Defender

Mortars

- Type 84 (W84) 82 mm mortars
- Type 89 60 mm mortars

Small arms

Handguns

- Beretta M9 Pistol
- Enfield revolver

Assault Rifles

- Type 81 Assault rifles
- M16 Assault rifles

Sub-Machine guns

- Uzi Submachine Guns

Machine guns

- PK machine guns (Chinese version of Russian PKM)
- Type 56 LMG (Chinese version of Russian RPD)

Sniper Rifles

- Dragunov Sniper Rifles

Grenade launchers

- M203 Grenade launcher

Rocket launchers

- Type 69 RPG Rocket launchers (Chinese version of RPG-7)

== See also ==
- Sri Lanka Air Force Regiment
