= Regiment Special Force =

SLAF Regiment Special Force
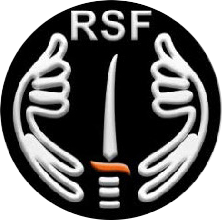
- Active: 2003 - Present
- Country: Sri Lanka
- Branch: Sri Lanka Air Force
- Type: Special Forces
- Role: Special operations
- Size: Classified
- Part of: Directorate of Ground Operations, Sri Lanka Air Force
- Garrison/HQ: SLAF Station Morawewa
- Nickname: RSF
- Motto: Never accept defeat
- Anniversaries: 7 July
- Engagements: Sri Lankan Civil War, Rescue Missions

Commanders
- Current commander: Wing Commander Priyadarshana Hettiarachchi

The Regiment Special Force (RSF) is a Sri Lanka Air Force elite special force unit, which is part of the SLAF Regiment. It was raised in 2006. The RSF Wing is an independent formation of the SLAF and commanded by a Commanding Officer who reports to the SLAF Commander through Director Ground Operations for the efficient and effective function.

== History ==
The squadron was formed due to the Bandaranaike Airport attack by the LTTE. Initially formed as Air Base Defence and Rescue Squadron at SLAF Base Hingurakgoda on 07 July 2003, it was renamed in 2006 as Regiment Special Forces Wing. The unit then shifted to SLAF Station Morawewa in 2007.

== Role ==
- CA/CP/Reinforcement Operations.
- Battlefield Rescue/ Recovery Operations with respect to downed aircraft/aircrew and passengers.
- Sea/Air/Land disaster related search and rescue missions related to natural and man made disasters.
- Securing landing zones/pickup zones for insertion extraction of special operations forces of Army/Navy/Air Force.
- Recapturing air bases.
- Provide defenses in an enemy attack as a rapid deployment force.
- Rescue operations and recovering of downed air crew in enemy or friendly terrain.
- Assist civil authorities in national emergency.

== Capabilities ==
CQB or Close Combat Fighting

Most Air Bases are heavily built up due to availability of aircraft hangars and other related infrastructure. RSF skills on house clearance and close quarter fighting provides an added advantage for operating effectively with minimum collateral damage in Air Bases.

Special Reconnaissance

SR by the RSF can be highly effective when conventional or tactical collection assets are unable to collect information of operational significance.

Explosive Ordnance Disposal

Airborne Forces

Combat Search and Rescue

Security Warfare And Advanced Tactics Course

== Training ==
The unit's personnel are trained in air base rescue operations, field craft, bomb disposal, fire fighting, water survival and rescue operations. Advanced training is carried out at the Sri Lanka Army Special Force training school at Maduruoya.

- RSF basic course
- Heli-born Course
- Water-born Course
- Tactical Urban Fighting Unit (TUF)
- Special operations phase for advance Regt Cadets.
- Jungle Survival Course for air crews
- Orientation courses for Air gunners
- Refresher courses for RSF
- QRT Course
- Leadership Training for out siders
- Team building Corse for School cadets

== Equipment ==
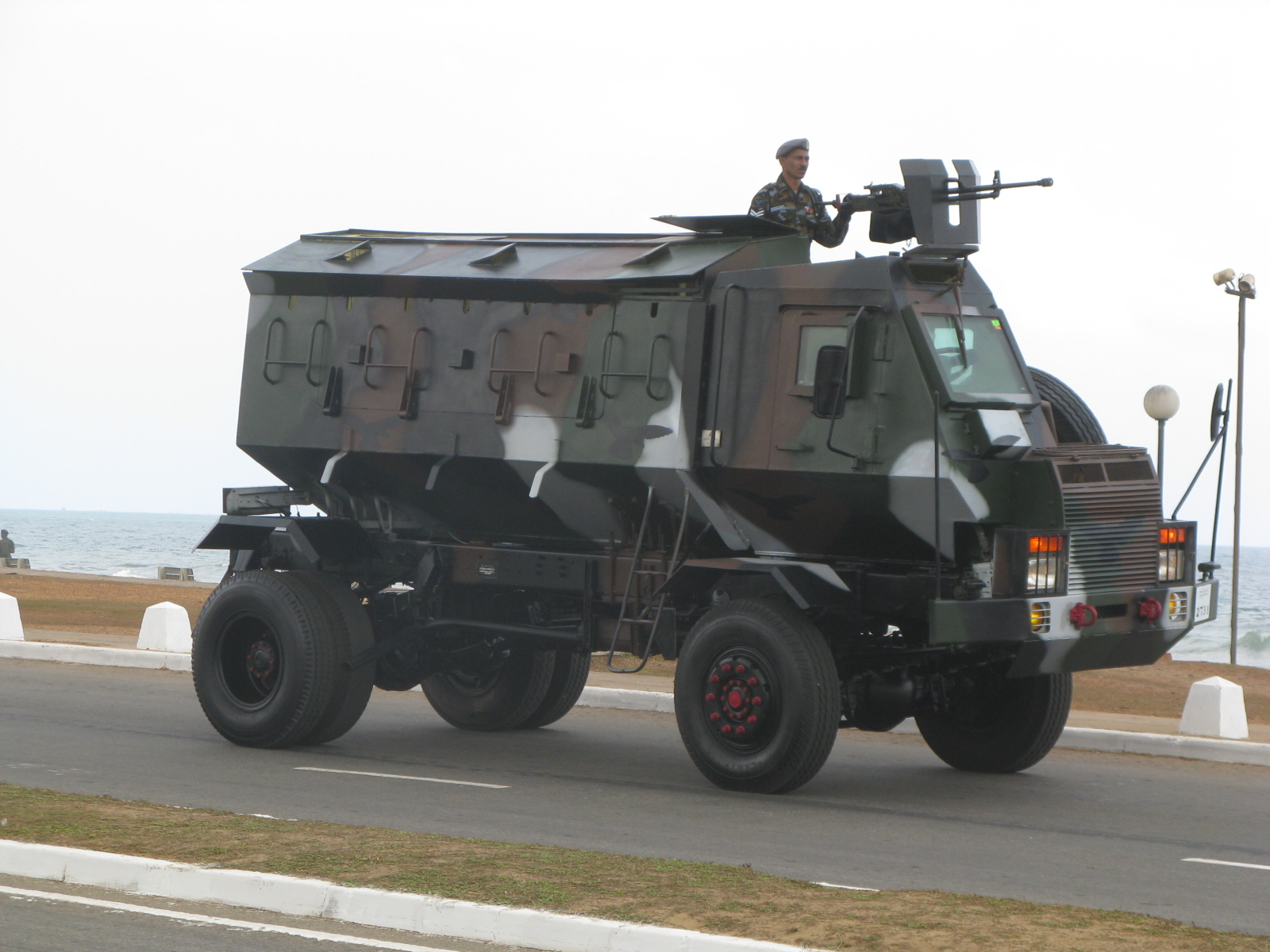
Sri Lanka Air Force Unibuffel APC

Handguns

- (Austria) Glock 17
- (Italy) M9
- (Switzerland) SIG Sauer P226
- (Italy) Beretta 92
- (Czech Republic) CZ-SP-01

Assault Rifles

- (United States) M16 (M16A3 and M16A4)
- (United States) M4
- (China) QBZ-95
- (Singapore) SAR-21
- (China) Type 56-2
- (China) Type 56 (Ceremonial purposes only)
- (Israel) MZ-47

Shotguns

- (South Africa) Armsel Striker
- (Italy) Franchi SPAS-15
- (Italy) Benelli M4

Sub-machine Guns

- (Israel) Uzi
- (Germany) MP5 (MP5A3, MP5SD6, MP5KA5)

Machine Guns

- (China) Type 80 machine gun
- (Belgium) FN MAG
- (Russia) PKM
- (Belgium) FN Minimi

Sniper Rifles

- (United Kingdom) L96A1
- (West Germany) PSG1
- (Serbia) M93
- (Germany) SIG Sauer SSG 3000

Grenade Launchers

- (United States) M203
- (South Africa) MGL

Rocket Launchers

- (China) Type 69 RPG

Anti-Aircraft Weapons Systems

- (Russia) SA-18
- (Sweden) L40/70
- (Russia) ZSU-23-2
- (Israel) TCM-20

Vehicles

- (Sri Lanka) Unibuffel
- (United Kingdom) Defender
- (Sri Lanka) Unicorn

Mortars

- (China) W84
- (China) Type 89

== See also ==
- Military of Sri Lanka
- Sri Lanka Air Force
- Military ranks and insignia of the Sri Lanka Air Force
- Sri Lanka Army Commando Regiment
- Sri Lanka Army Special Forces Regiment
- Special Boat Squadron
