= Avalon (MPV) =

- Type: Armoured personnel carrier
- Place of origin: Sri Lanka

Service history
- In service: 2020 – present
- Used by: Sri Lanka Army

Production history
- Designer: Sri Lanka Electrical and Mechanical Engineers
- Manufacturer: Sri Lanka Electrical and Mechanical Engineers
- Unit cost: LKR 20 000 000 ($106400)
- Produced: 2020 – present
- Variants: Command variant

Specifications
- Mass: 19.8 t
- Length: 8.4 m (27.56 ft)
- Width: 2.5 m (8.2 ft)
- Height: 3.5 m (11.5 ft)
- Crew: 2 + 12 passengers
- Armor: 6 mm steel and composite armour
- Engine: Cummins ISBe 270 BS III water-cooled turbocharged Diesel engine 280 hp
- Suspension: 6×6 wheeled

UniAVALON or simply Avalon is a Sri Lankan 6×6 wheeled MRAP-type heavy armored personnel carrier manufactured by Sri Lanka Electrical and Mechanical Engineers (SLEME).

== Design ==
Avalon is a 6x6 Mine-Resistant Ambush Protected/Command vehicle with space for 12 troops and a crew of 2. It is capable of electronic warfare and gathering intelligence with real-time information from any terrain with a variety of cameras, drones and jammers. It is also equipped with newer blast protection seats developed jointly with the Moratuwa University.

It is designed to operate in the sandy terrain in Mali and is heavily armored with a V-shaped crew compartment and flat regions of the body are covered in slat armour giving the vehicle protection against IED explosions, small arms attacks and RPGs. It can also be synced with a command center that allows the ground commander to monitor the surroundings using 360 degree cameras, and can launch short/medium ranged drones to maintain real-time visuals/communications with base commander.

External media

Images
- Avalon MPV with Slat armour
- Command variant front
- Command variant rear

Video
- Army's new workshop with hardware products and heavy vehicles

== Production history ==
The first batch of 12 vehicles were initially scheduled for delivery in June 2019 for the Sri Lanka Army contingent for the United Nations Multidimensional Integrated Stabilization Mission in Mali. But the official unveiling was done in December 2020 during the opening of the new SLEME Workshop in Kosgama.

== See also ==
- Unibuffel
- Unicorn APC
- Unicob
