= Sri Lanka Electrical and Mechanical Engineers =

- Active: 12 December 1949 - Present
- Country: Sri Lanka
- Branch: Sri Lanka Army
- Type: Engineering
- Role: Combat Support
- Size: 6000 in 6 Units
- Regimental Centre: Slave Island, Colombo
- Motto: Skill to Battle
- Colors
- March: Quick:Lillibullero
- Anniversaries: 12 December (Regimental day)
- Engagements: 1971 Insurrection; Insurrection 1987-89; Sri Lankan Civil War
- Website: https://alt.army.lk/sleme/

Commanders
- Centre Commandant: Col D A Sirimannage
- Current Director EME: Maj Gen S A N J Ariyasena
- Colonel of the Regiment: Maj Gen Indu Samarakoon

The Sri Lanka Electrical and Mechanical Engineers (SLEME) (Sinhala: ශ්‍රී ලංකා විදුලි හා යාන්ත්‍රික ඉංජිනේරු රෙජිමේන්තුව Shri Lanka Viduli Ha Yanthrika Injineru Rejimentuwa) is a Combat Support corps of the Sri Lanka Army. It is made up of six regular regiments and one volunteer (reserve) regiment. Regiment Center located at Kew Road, Slave Island, Colombo. The present strength of the corps is 200 officers and 5763 other ranks.

== Role ==
The role of the Sri Lanka Electrical and Mechanical Engineers (SLEME) is to repair and maintain all electrical, mechanical biomedical, and optical equipment in the SL Army, except for engineer plant and signal equipment. Repair and recovery teams are employed in the field to give repair and recovery support to operational commitments. In addition to its classic role, SLEME is tasked to function essential services such as electricity (power generation), water supply drainage, and railways during times of workers unrest and strikes. There are three base workshops at Udawalawe, Katubedda, and Colombo for base repairs of vehicles and equipment. Corps consists of a trade school to uplift the knowledge of its members at Gannoruwa-Kandy. The SLEME also undertakes the production of Unibuffel APCs.

== History ==
The Corps of Ceylon Electrical and Mechanical Engineers (CEME) was born on 12 December 1949 with the enlistment of 2/Lt. R.A.J Ratnam CEME. The CEME first became operative as a small workshop, located in the Army Headquarters premises under the advisory capacity of Capt. Roy Davies REME. Activities were initially confined to minor repairs to mechanical transport vehicles, armaments, small arms, and the production of a large number of training stores. Later an engineer officer, Maj N.V Matthysz was appointed officer commanding and was its first commanding officer in the rank of lieutenant colonel. The unit moved to Kew Road, Slave Island (where its present Regiment Centre is) on 1 September 1950. This was a command workshop of the REME, and the CEME was fortunate to get the building with some of the available machinery as most of such machinery was back loaded by the British before the handover. The CEME strength when moving to the new premises was 1 British officer seconded form REME, 2 Ceylonese officers, 4-seconded NCOs from the REME, 14 other ranks, and some civilian tradesmen.

During the 1971 JVP insurrection helped maintain transport services handling train and bus services as the civil administration became crippled in many areas. The Light Aid Detachment (LAD) which was stationed in Modara was improved and converted to the 100 CEME Armoured Workshop and CEME began converting trucks into improvised armoured vehicles. After Sri Lanka became a republic in the year 1972 the British queens crown (Regalia) which adored every state symbol up to this time was replaced by the 'Dharmachakraya' symbol instead which included the CEME emblem and CEME was renamed into SLEME (Sri Lanka Electrical and Mechanical Engineers).

During the Sri Lankan Civil War, SLEME developed the first armoured vehicle called "YAKA" which was further developed to create the "Unicorn" type and in 1997 the modernisation of the Unicorn led to the production of Unibuffel vehicles.

== Products ==
- Unicorn APC: Mine-Resistant Ambush Protected based on the South African Buffels. Production continued until more advanced Unibuffel upgraded and modified ambulance variant of the Mark VI designed in 2000 entered mass production in 2006. It's reported that more than 150 Unicorns are in active service.
- Unibuffel :Mine-protected wheeled, which is an improved version of the Unicorn.
- Avalon (MPV): 6×6 wheeled MRAP-type heavy armored personnel carrier capable of electronic warfare and gathering intelligence with real-time information from any terrain with a variety of cameras, drones and jammers.
- UniAIMOV is a 4x4 light armored High-Mobility/Forward Command vehicle mainly designed for urban warfare, counter-insurgency and special operations.
- UniCOLT: Family of 4x4 military logistical vehicles with multiple variants for different roles.
- Unicob: 4x4 Mine Resistant Ambush Protected Vehicle (MRAPV).

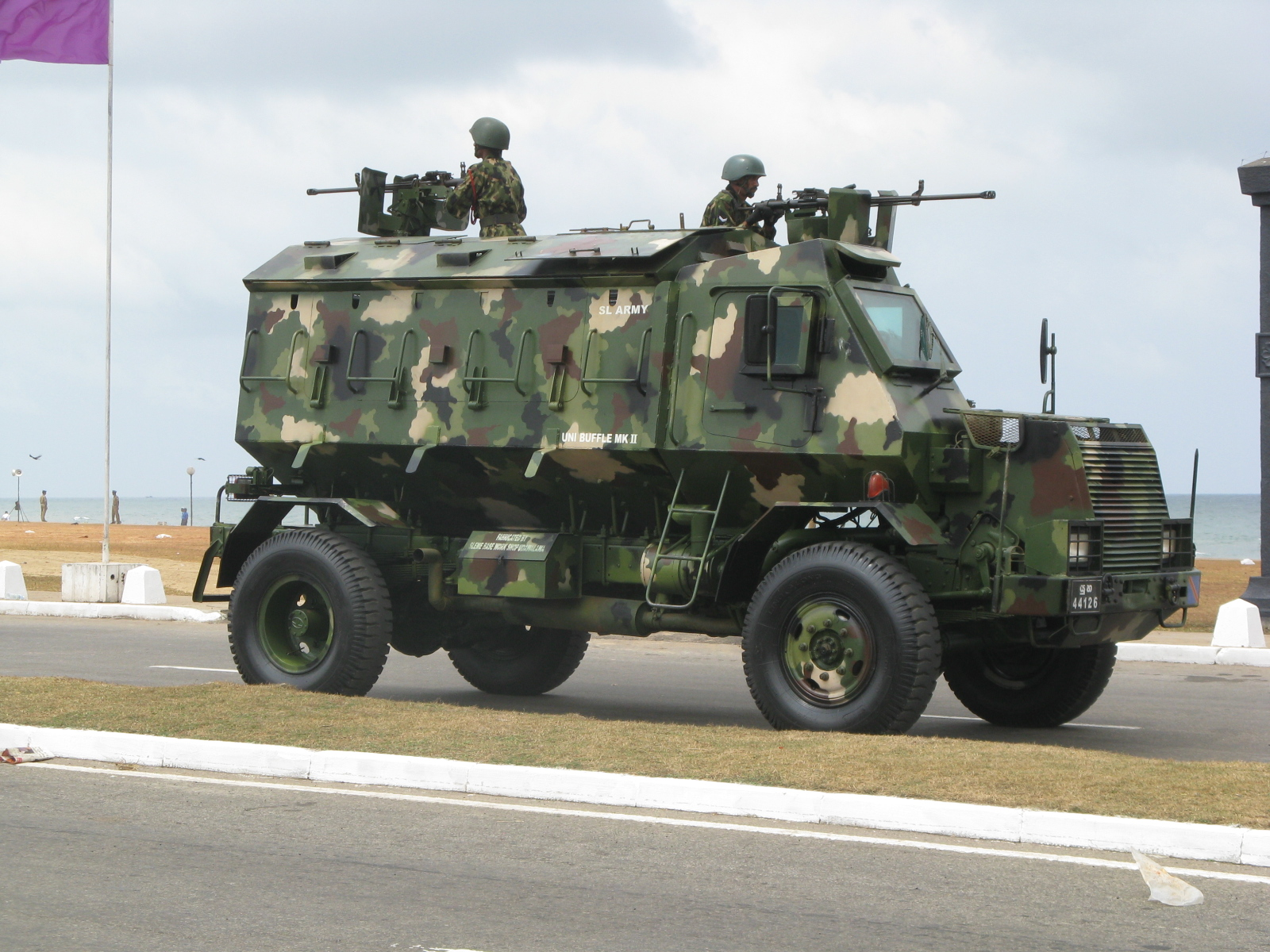
Unibuffel

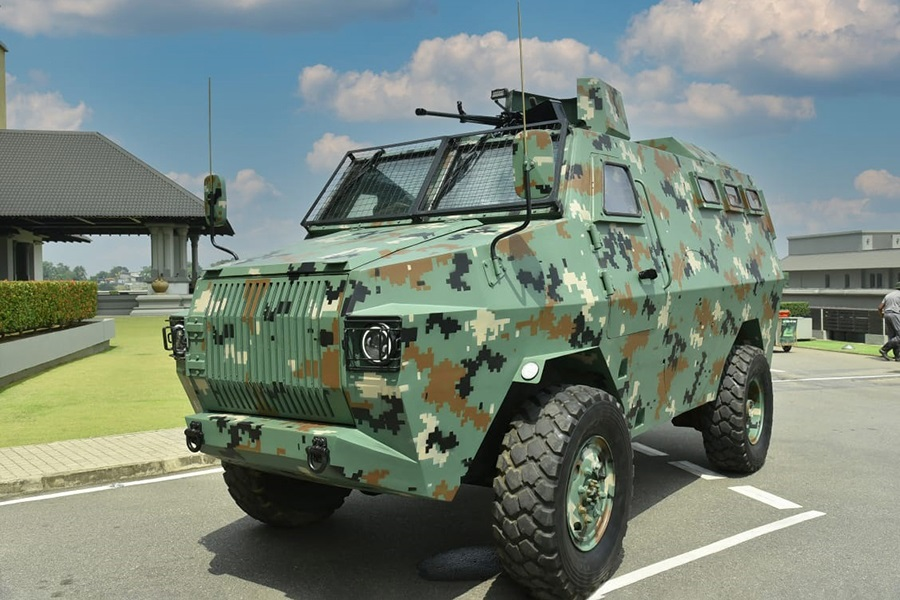
Unicob

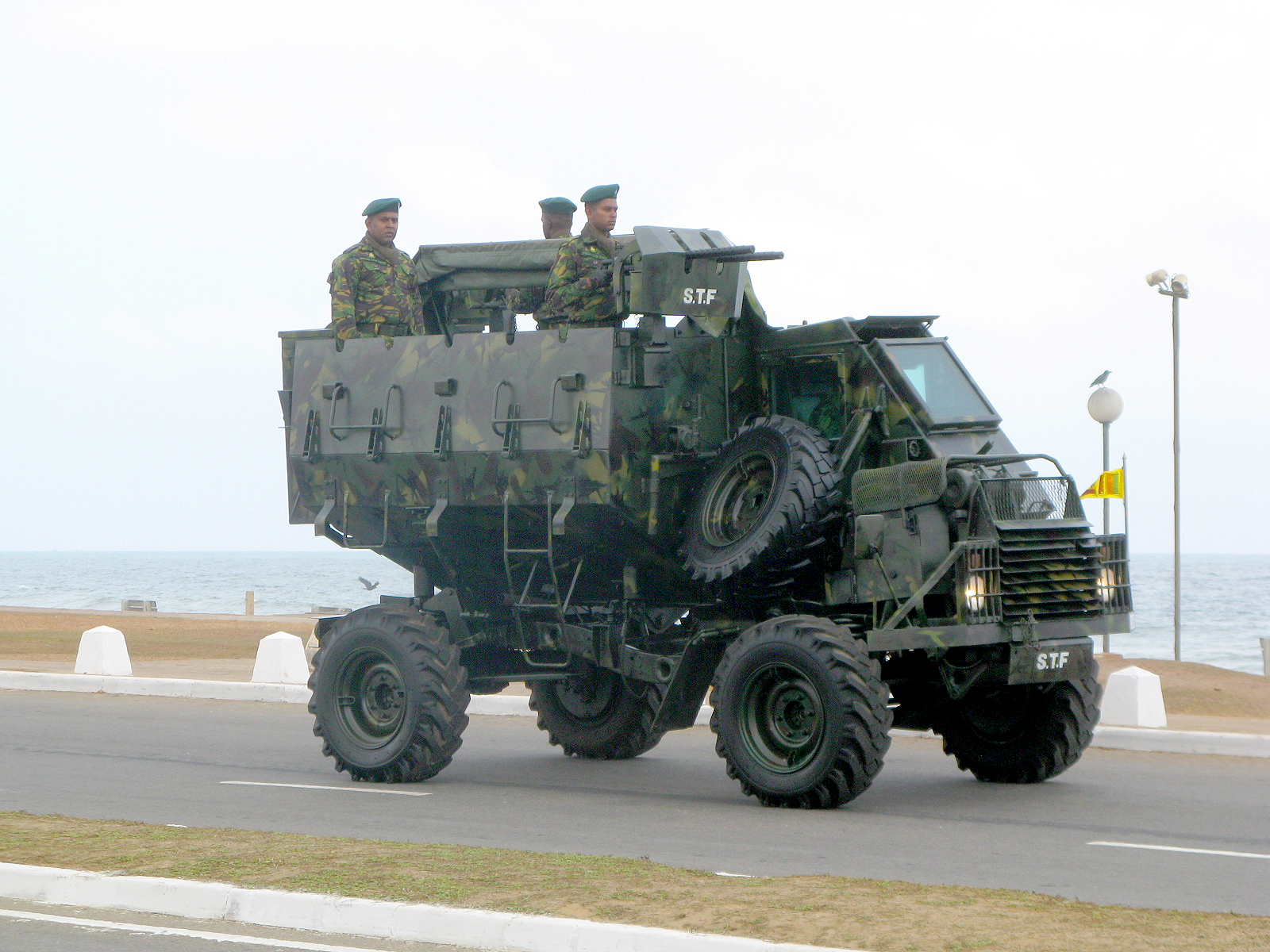
Unicorn

== Establishments ==
=== Regular and Volunteer Units ===
- 1st Sri Lanka Electrical and Mechanical Engineers - Panagoda
- 2nd(V) Sri Lanka Electrical and Mechanical Engineers - Diyathalawa (Formed on 19 April 2005)
- 3rd Sri Lanka Electrical and Mechanical Engineers - Minneriya
- 4th Sri Lanka Electrical and Mechanical Engineers - Jaffna
- 5th Sri Lanka Electrical and Mechanical Engineers - Anuradhapura
- 6th Sri Lanka Electrical and Mechanical Engineers - Mullaitivu
- 7th Sri Lanka Electrical and Mechanical Engineers - Kilinochchi
- EME Armd Battalion - Sarliyapura
- EME Arty Battalion-Minneriya
- School of Electrical and Mechanical Engineering
- Army Industrial Factory

=== Workshops ===
- Base Workshop, Colombo
- Base Workshop, Udawalawa
- Base Workshop, Katubeddha
- Base Workshop, Kosgama
- Bio Medical Independent Workshop

== Notable members ==
- General Cyril Ranatunge, VSV, SLAC - former GOC, Joint Operations Command and Permanent Secretary of the Ministry of Defence
- Lieutenant Colonel Noel Matthysz - Commanding Officer, Ceylon Electrical and Mechanical Engineers & accused conspirator in the 1962 coup d'état attempt
- Maj Gen WGMUR Perera - First to be the Deputy Chief of Staff-SL Army & Col Comdt-2006 to 2010 form Corps of EME.
- Maj Gen G S Padumadasa - First to be the Military Secretary from Crop of EME

== Alliances ==
- United Kingdom - Royal Electrical and Mechanical Engineers

== Order of precedence ==
Preceded by Sri Lanka Army Ordnance Corps	Order of Precedence	Succeeded by Sri Lanka Corps of Military Police

== See also ==
- UniCOLT
- Unibuffel
- Unicorn

== External links and sources ==
- Sri Lanka Army
- Sri Lanka Electrical and Mechanical Engineers
