= Sri Lanka Air Force Regiment =

- Crest of the SLAF Regiment
- Active: 1956–Present
- Country: Sri Lanka
- Branch: Sri Lanka Air Force
- Type: Air Force Infantry
- Role: Force Protection, Ground-Based Air Defence, Air Assault
- Part of: Sri Lanka Air Force
- Nickname: The Regiment
- Motto: Constant Protection
- March: Quick – Holyrood
- Engagements: 1971 Insurrection; Insurrection 1987-89; Sri Lankan Civil War

Commanders
- Director Ground Operations: Air Vice Marshal K Yahampath

The Sri Lanka Air Force Regiment is a specialized ground combat branch within the Sri Lanka Air Force, responsible for capturing and defending airfields and associated installations. Its members are the SLAF Regiment Officers and the airmen of operations ground specialization. The SLAF Regiment is fully capable of protecting all its air bases, installations by itself using infantry and light armored units as well as launch air assaults with Airborne Infantry elements (paratroopers). Ground-based air defence of vital military and civil installations around the country is carried out by the SLAF Regiment along with combat search and rescue missions (CSAR). The corps itself is simply known as the 'regiment'.

== History ==
SLAF Regiment gunner on guard duty.

The first RCyAF Regiment Squadron was formed under Flt Lt Gerry W. Weeraratna in 1956 to provide ceremonial guards and security for bases and airfields of the Royal Ceylon Air Force based on the RAF Regiment of the Royal Air Force. However the ground defence of the air bases and civil airports were supplemented by the Ceylon Army. This limited the ability of the army to deploy it troops in offensive operations and made the air force dependent on the army. This was seen specially during the 1971 JVP Insurrection.

With the start of the Sri Lankan Civil War the SLAF Regiment underwent a large expansion due to the SLAF increasing the number of airfields and the threat to these from the LTTE. In 1971 SLAF Regiment was formed with 101 squadron, 102 squadron and the only one volunteers suqdron was formed as 106 squadron. In addition to that special squadron was formed as SLAF Commando Unit with elite 52 commandos commanded by Flt. Lt. J.E.Peiris. Later, The Regiment formations increased to a total of 25 Field Wings by 2000 and later to 45 Field Wings. When the Sri Lanka Artillery disbanded its Anti-Aircraft Regiments in 1962, the air defence role of Sri Lanka has been taken up by the SLAF Regiment which it provides today, by the Land Based Air Defence Wing.

Since 1956, the SLAF Regiment frequently mounts the guard at the Presidents House. In March 2009, the SLAF Regiment was presented with the President’s Colours.

== Organisation and role ==
SLAF Regiment officers and gunners are organized into 45 Field Wings, which are subdivided into squadrons that are and further subdivided into flights specially trained in ground combat. As conduct of operations related to ground defence is placed under the purview of the Directorate of Ground Operations, the Director Ground Operations is the de facto commander of the SLAF Regiment.

At first the primary role was airfield security and ceremonial duties. In recent years with expansion of the number of wings the SLAF Regiment has begun supporting the Sri Lanka Army in manning defence lines in the north central part of the country and taking part in offensive operations jointly or independently. SLAF Regiment detachments have been established in Morawawa, Pulukunawa-Mahaoya, Puliyankulam, Mankulam and Poovarasnkulam and has been deployed in Trincomalee and Peraru. But airfield security remains the corps primary task, members of the SLAF Regiment guards both Civilian and military airports around the country. It also handles the Ground-Based Air Defence role of the Sri Lankan military, protecting both civilian and military installations. To achieve its objectives the regiment uses infantry, light armoured, parachute, mortar and anti-aircraft units.

In addition to these roles, the regiment carries out Airborne Rescue Operations and provide ground support such as Explosive Ordnance Disposal (EOD) requirement of the Air Force, its personal serve as SLAF's firefighters and intelligence. The Regimental Training Centre is located at SLAF Ampara in Ampara.

== Special Forces ==
Regiment Special Force is an elite Special Forces unit of the Sri Lanka Air Force, part of the SLAF Regiment, formerly Air Base Defence Rescue Squadron, established on 7 July 2003.

The task and role of RSF's Squadrons involves

- Recapturing air bases.
- Provide defenses in an enemy attack as a rapid deployment force.
- Rescue operations and recovering of downed air crew in enemy or friendly terrain.
- Protection of senior air force officers.
- Assist civil authorities in national emergency.

SPECIAL AIR BORNE FORCE (SABF)

A highly trained troops primarily assigned for VIP Protection duties.

== SLAF Regiment units ==
- Field Wings
  - No. 1 Wing, SLAF Regiment
  - No. 2 Wing, SLAF Regiment
  - No. 3 Wing, SLAF Regiment (Volunteer)
  - No. 5 Wing, SLAF Regiment
  - No. 6 Wing, SLAF Regiment
  - No. 7 Wing, SLAF Regiment
  - No. 8 Wing, SLAF Regiment
  - No. 9 Wing, SLAF Regiment
  - No. 10 Wing, SLAF Regiment
  - No. 11 Wing, SLAF Regiment
  - No. 12 Wing, SLAF Regiment
  - No. 13 Wing, SLAF Regiment
  - No. 14 Wing, SLAF Regiment
  - No. 15 Wing, SLAF Regiment
  - No. 16 Wing, SLAF Regiment
  - No. 17 Wing, SLAF Regiment
  - No. 18 Wing, SLAF Regiment
  - No. 19 Wing, SLAF Regiment
  - No. 20 Wing, SLAF Regiment
  - No. 21 Wing, SLAF Regiment
  - No. 22 Wing, SLAF Regiment
  - No. 23 Wing, SLAF Regiment
  - No. 24 Wing, SLAF Regiment
  - No. 25 Wing, SLAF Regiment HIN
  - No. 26 Wing, SLAF Regiment KAT
  - No. 27 Wing, SLAF Regiment
  - No. 28 Wing, SLAF Regiment
  - No. 29 Wing, SLAF Regiment
  - No. 30 Wing, SLAF Regiment
  - No. 31 Wing, SLAF Regiment
  - No. 33 Wing, SLAF Regiment
  - No. 34 Wing, SLAF Regiment MOW
  - No. 35 Wing, SLAF Regiment
  - No. 36 Wing, SLAF Regiment
  - No. 37 Wing, SLAF Regiment
  - No. 38 Wing, SLAF Regiment
  - No. 39 Wing, SLAF Regiment
  - No. 40 Wing, SLAF Regiment
  - No. 41 Wing, SLAF Regiment
  - No. 42 Wing, SLAF Regiment
  - No. 43 Wing, SLAF Regiment
  - No. 44 Wing, SLAF Regiment
  - No. 45 Wing, SLAF Regiment
- Air Defence Squadrons
  - No 4 Air Defence Radar Squadron
  - No. 32 Land Based Air Defence Wing
- Other Units
  - SLAF Band

== Weapons ==
SLAF Regiment gunners on combat patrol.

Air Surveillance Radars

- YLC-2 Radar
- INDRA Mk-II - 4 units provided by India in 2011

Surface to Air Missiles

- SA-18 Grouse (9K38 Igla) provided by India in 2007, 54 operational as of 2020
- SA-16 Gimlet

Air Defense Artillery

- Bofors L40/70 40 mm AA guns
- ZSU-23-2 twin 23 mm AA guns
- TCM-20 twin 20 mm AA guns

Land vehicles

- Unibuffel – Mine-protected IMV
- Unicorn – Mine-protected APC
- Land Rover Defender

Mortars

- Type 84 (W84) 82 mm mortars
- Type 89 60 mm mortars

Small arms

Handguns

- Glock 17
- Beretta M9 Pistol
- Enfield revolver
- CZ P-10 C

Assault Rifles

- Type 81 Assault rifles
- AK-47 Assault rifles
- M16 Assault rifles
- QBZ-95 Assault rifles
- SAR-21 Assault rifles
- EMTAN MZ-47 Assault rifles

Sub-Machine guns

- Uzi Submachine Guns
- CZ Scorpion Evo 3

Machine guns

- PK machine guns (Chinese version of Russian PKM)
- Type 56 LMG (Chinese version of Russian RPD)

Sniper Rifles

- Dragunov Sniper Rifles

Grenade launchers

- M203 Grenade launcher

Rocket launchers

- Type 69 RPG Rocket launchers (Chinese version of RPG-7)

== See also ==
- Sri Lanka Air Force Regiment Special Force
- Nigerian Air Force Regiment
