= Special Task Force (Sri Lanka) =

- විශේෂ කාර්ය බලකාය
- Active: 1983; 43 years ago
- Country: Sri Lanka
- Branch: Sri Lanka Police
- Type: Police tactical unit
- Size: ~8000 (2017)
- Nickname: STF
- Mottos: නියතයි ජය; (English: Absolute Victory)
- Colours: Marine Green; Gold
- Anniversaries: 1 March
- Engagements: Sri Lankan Civil War; Second JVP Insurrection; Operation Yukthiya
- Website: https://stf.lk/

Commanders
- Commandant: Samantha de silwa
- Inspector General of Police: Priyantha Weerasooriya

Insignia
- Ensign

The Special Task Force (STF) (Sinhala: විශේෂ කාර්ය බලකාය Visesha Karya Balakaya; Tamil: சிறப்பு அதிரடிப் படை) is a police tactical unit of the Sri Lanka Police specialising in anti-irregular military, apprehension of armed and dangerous criminals, clandestine and covert operations, combat and patrolling in urban areas, counterterrorism and hostage rescue crisis managements, crowd control, executive protection, high-risk tactical law enforcement situations, indirect fire for support operations, irregular warfare, operating in difficult to access terrain, protecting high-level meeting areas, search and rescue people who are in distress or imminent danger from disaster, support crowd control and riot control, tactical special operations, and other tasks requiring special training. It was formed in 1983 not as a military force, but rather as a highly specialised armed police unit.

== Function ==
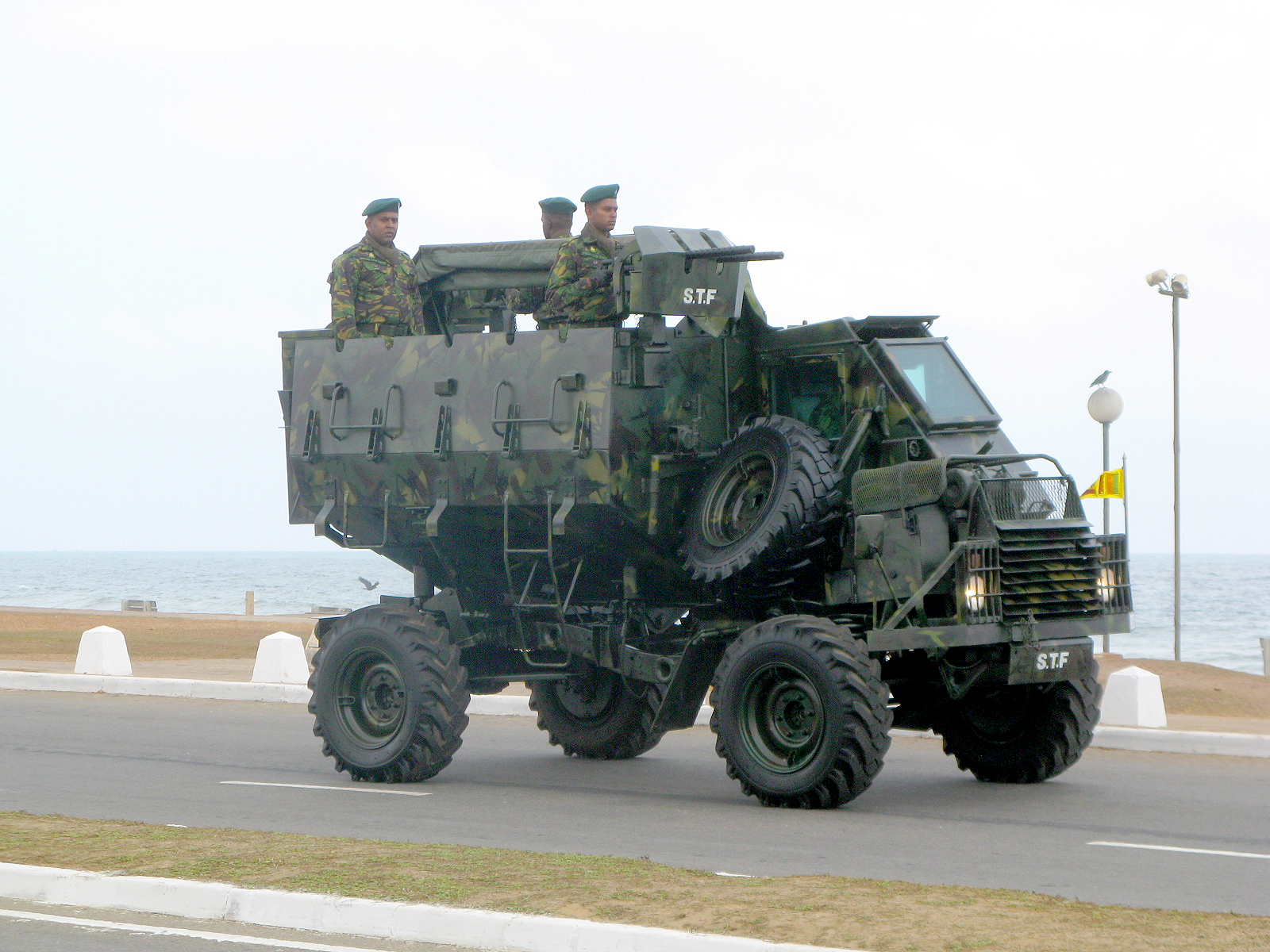
STF Unicorn Armored Personnel Carrier

The STF is spearhead primarily involve anti-irregular military, counterinsurgency, counterterrorism and hostage rescue crisis managements, executive protection, high-risk tactical law enforcement situations, operating in difficult to access and extremely dangerous areas, protecting high-level meeting areas, serving high-risk arrest and search warrants, and special operations that are extremely high-risk and dangerous – as the most highly trained police organisation in Sri Lanka – it would be the lead unit whenever law enforcement forces engaged the Liberation Tigers of Tamil Eelam (LTTE). The STF is mostly stationed in the Eastern Province of Sri Lanka where the LTTE was wiped out. Some small number of units are placed in Mannar District and Vavuniya District.

Other units are based in Colombo and provide VIP security. The STF is internationally recognised for its expertise in these areas and it is often invited to assist foreign law enforcement agencies with planning major events such as the 2008 Beijing Olympics and in dealing with possible terrorist threats.

== Formation ==
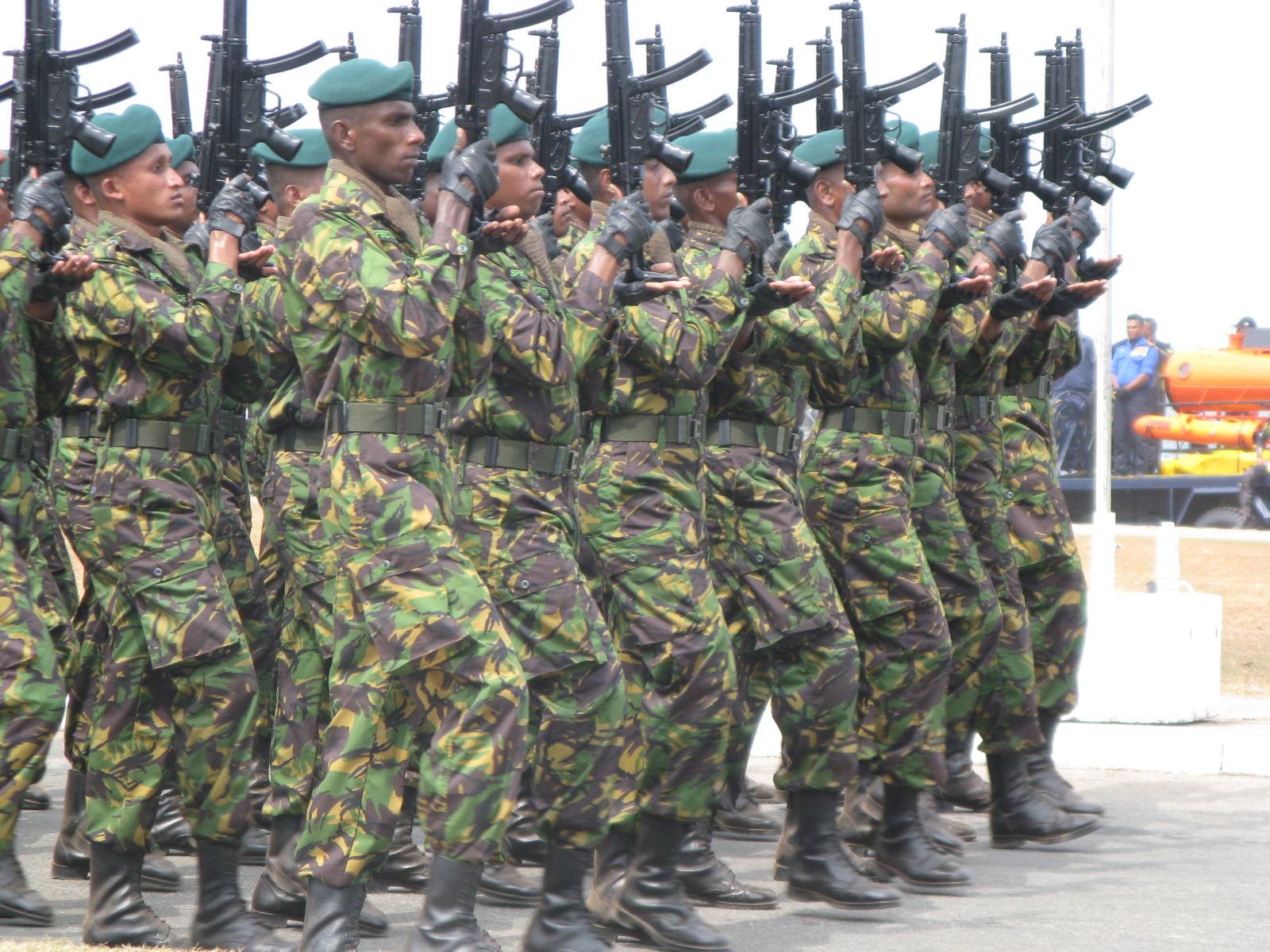
STF contingent (armed with MP5s) at the 2012 independence parade

When the Special Task Force (STF) was formed in 1983, it comprised mainly existing policemen. It was headed by the 1960 Rome Olympian and existing Senior Superintendent of Police, Dharmasiri Weerakoon. The STF were trained by the Sri Lanka Army (SLA) in the handling of small arms and light weapons and were given basic training in jungle warfare and small unit tactics.

They deeply resemble a paramilitary organisation and later separate training facilities for the STF have been established in Kalutara, 42 km (26 mi) south of Colombo. The first platoons formed were deployed in the North of Sri Lanka to provide additional support for police stations and to stem the LTTE separatists.

The STF was enhanced considerably in 1983 when former British Army Special Air Service (SAS) crack teams were brought in to provide specialised training in all aspects of counterinsurgency, counterterrorism and hostage rescue crisis managements, and executive protection. The SAS experts trained the STF troops at Katukurunda wing of the Police College, after making the training school into a sophisticated training complex. Further training was provided with assistance of Keenie Meenie Services in 1984.

Later, the STF experts took over from the SAS in 1988. Today the STF has a fully-fledged training wing, regarded as one of the best in South East Asia. 11 August 1984, that the Israel Security Agency Shin Beth was involved in the training of the Sri Lankan armed forces. Many officers belonging to Israel were also involved in the training of the Sri Lankan soldiers in Colombo.

In 2008, the STF received P2 APCs from Indonesia made by Sentra Surya Ekajaya to help the unit conduct their counterinsurgency operations against the LTTE.

== Operations ==
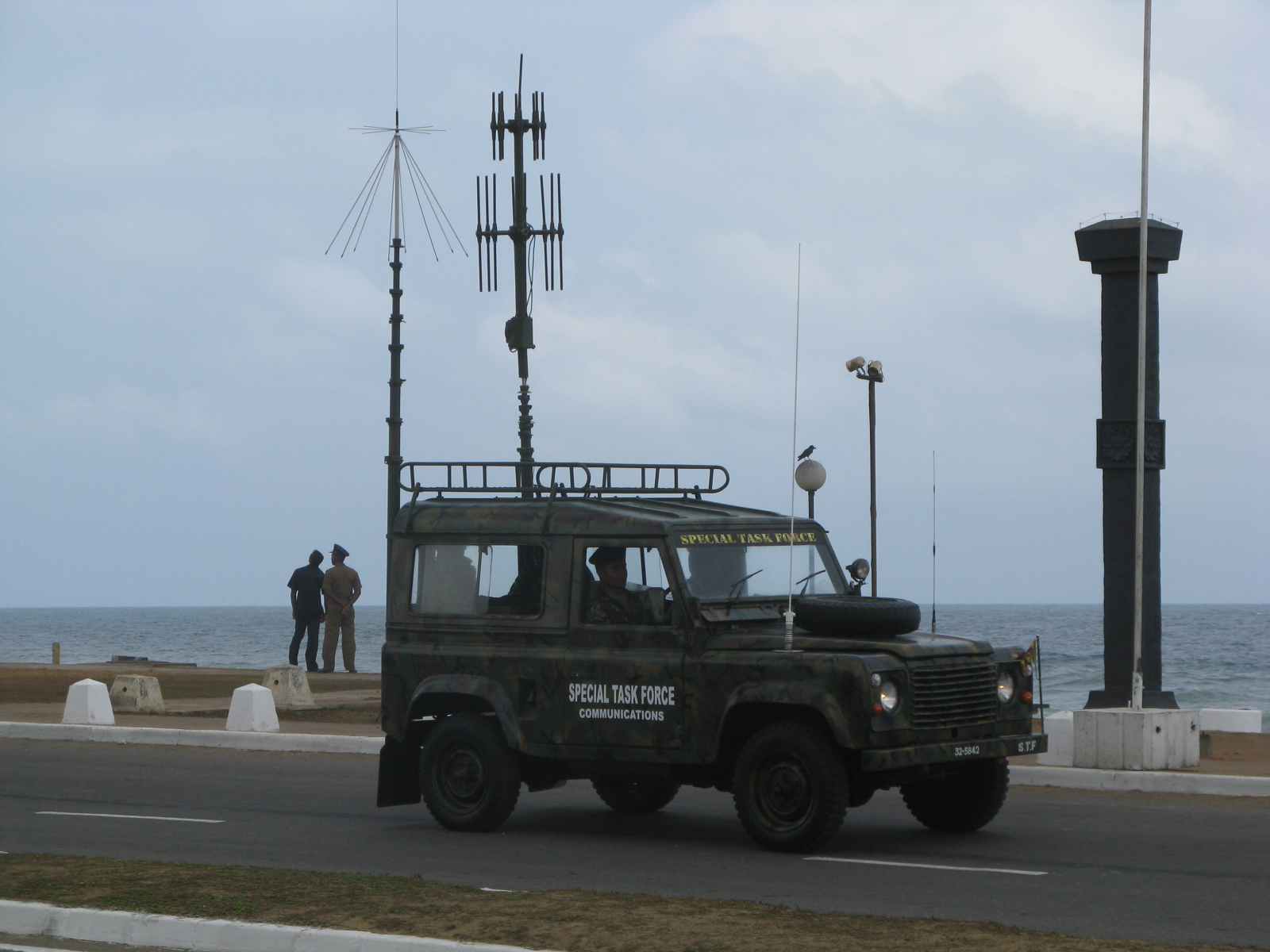
STF Communication Unit

By 1987, heavily involved in the Sri Lankan civil war, the STF was in control of the area from Kiran to Potuvil in the Batticaloa District. The STF was deployed in Company formation into 15 separate camps. When the Indian Peace Keeping Force was moved into the Batticaloa in 1987 as part of the ongoing peace process, the STF was in complete control of Batticoloa, and had restored a level of normalcy to the area. From 1983 to 1987 when the STF was in control over Batticoloa not a single STF camp had come under attack from the LTTE.

In 2019 STF involved in 2019 Kalmunai shootout.

=== Operation Niyathai Jaya (Definite Victory) ===
In its first major operation since the signing of the ceasefire agreement in 2002, Special Task Force troops launched a limited offensive named "Definite Victory" (In Sinhala: නියතයිි ජය) on January 4, 2007 against LTTE rebels in the Kanchikudichcharu and Thoppigala south regions of the Ampara District, as a reaction to the child abductions in Bakmitiyawa, Ampara and abduction of two teachers and 23 Tamil children in December 2006 while they were returning from extra classes to their homes.

As a result of this offensive, the elite police commandos were able to overrun more than fifteen (15) rebel camps including the Stanly Base, which was the main LTTE camp in the Ampara District and a regional intelligence and supply camp of the LTTE, Bagayadi Base, where local and foreign foodstuffs and sanitary material was stored, Janak Base, which made clothing identical to Sri Lanka Army and Special Task Force uniforms, Jeewan Base, which was another supply camp from which the STF was able to recover four vehicles and the Diana Base where LTTE leaders meet. This camp was furnished with luxury items which were denied to the ordinary LTTE cadres.

After the fall of Stanly Base, STF troops were able to find an explosive laden truck and a motor cycle that the rebels were planning to use to carry out suicide attacks in the capital of Colombo. And it is also reported that LTTE was housing a large number of child soldiers conscripted by them in this camp. Other than that, STF troops were able to recover a large quantity of arms and ammunition, coffins, large number of anti-personnel mines, vehicles , satellite and radio receivers, global positioning systems, power generators, boats with name and logo of the Non Governmental Organization "Save the Children", tents with the logo of "UNHCR" and a fully equipped hospital donated to the militants by a Dutch INGO named ZOA Refugee Care This NGO donated hospital is named by the tigers as Thileepan memorial hospital. STF also said that they also found a water tanker truck donated by, the Tamil Rehabilitation Organization (TRO) which is a front organisation of the LTTE, who collect funds especially in the United States and Canada purportedly for civilians, but actually for the militant group. However, aid workers argue that the supplies must have been taken after they evacuated their office due to heavy fighting. Jeevan Thiagarajah, the head of the Consortium for Humanitarian Agencies, has stated that the matter is simply a misunderstanding.

As a result of this mission STF troops able to kill four rebels and the STF commented that the militants were fleeing from the area without retaliating against their troops.

== Criticism ==
The Special Task Force has been accused of various human rights abuses including extrajudicial killings and involvement in the disappearance of individuals.

- According to a United Nations commissioned study conducted in 1997, the STF was the arresting agency in 5% of the 1219 reported cases of disappearances in the Batticaloa district in North Eastern Province between 1988 and 1996.
- Additionally, after a visit to Sri Lanka from 24 August to 5 September in the same year, UN Special Rapporteur Bacre Waly Ndiaye reported the existence of allegations that individuals had died "while in the custody of the Special Task Force of Sri Lanka in Colombo".
- At least two incidents of extrajudicial killings involving members of the STF have also been noted by the Sri Lankan government or outside observers. Following the newest round of fighting between the government and the LTTE starting in April 1994, the mutilated bodies of between 21 and 31 Tamil males were discovered in rivers and lakes near Colombo.
- On 17 August ten STF officers (and fifteen others) were charged with committing the murders, which allegedly took place at the STF headquarters in Colombo. In addition, at least 17 extrajudicial killings were carried out by Sri Lankan security forces (including the STF) in Eastern Province in retaliation for LTTE attacks. Human rights monitors determined the deceased to be civilians, but security forces maintained that they were LTTE members.

== Commandants of the Special Task Force ==
No	Rank	Commandant	Took office	Left office	Notes
1	SP	Bodhi Liayange	20 February 1983	30 November 1983	
2	SP	Dharmasiri Weerakoon	1 December 1983	31 August 1984	
3	SSP	Zerney Wijesuriya	1 September 1983	14 December 1986	
4	DIG	R.K. Lionel Karunasena	15 December 1986	5 September 1995	
5	DIG	Dharmasiri Weerakoon	6 September 1995	31 May 1998	
6	DIG	Nimal Gunatilleke	1 June 1998	9 September 2003	
7	DIG	Nimal Lewke	10 September 2003	23 March 2008	
8	DIG	K.M.L. Sarathchandra	24 March 2008	19 March 2011	
9	DIG	R.W.M.C.Ranawana	24 March 2011	14 May 2014	
10	DIG	J.K.R.A. Perera	14 May 2014	9 August 2016	
11	SDIG	M. R. Latheef	10 August 2016	7 February 2020	
12	DIG	M.G.L. Gunathilaka	7 February 2020	9 June 2020	
13	SDIG	Waruna jayasundara	11 June 2020	Up to date	

== Equipment ==
=== Armoured vehicles ===
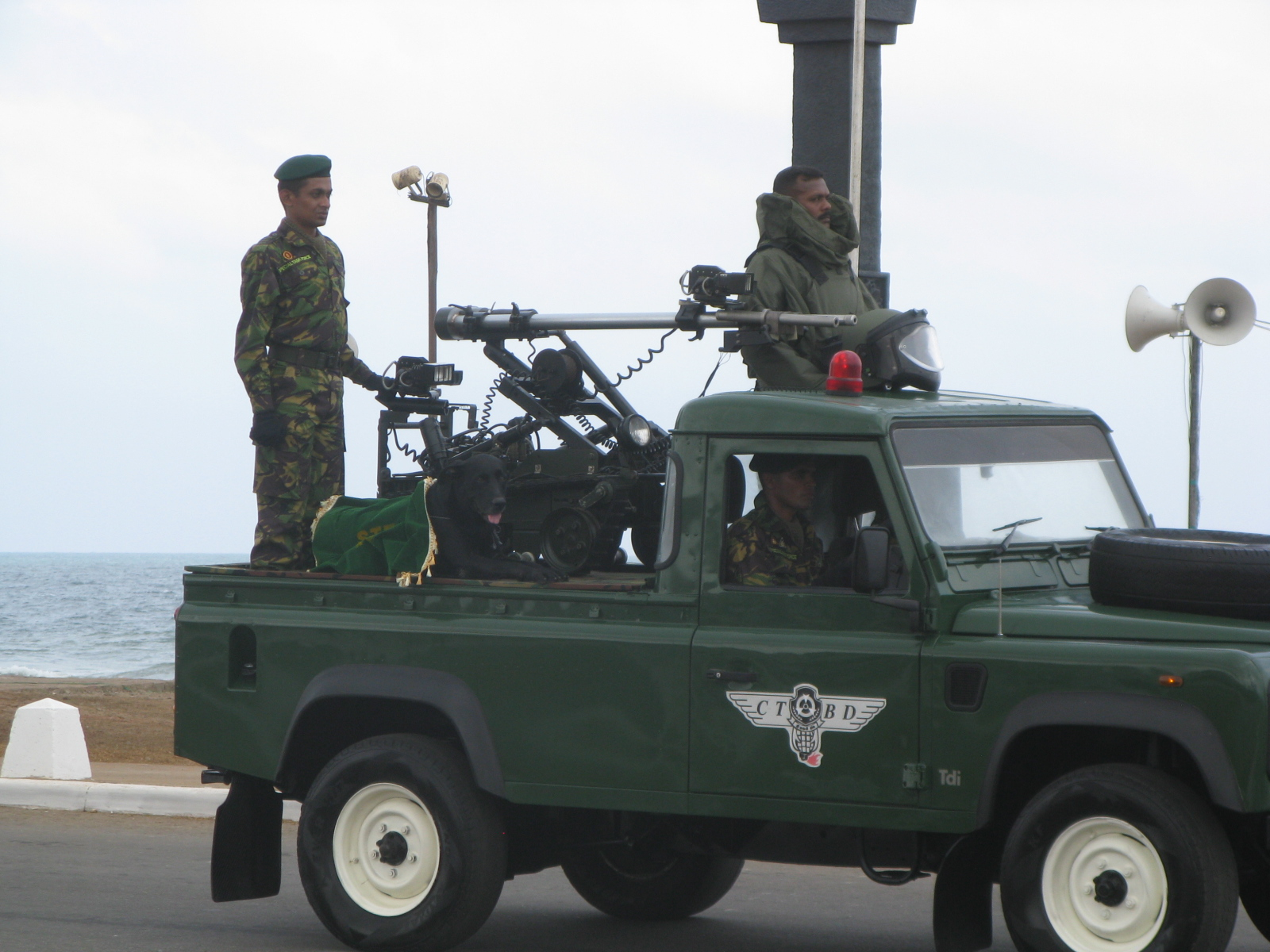
STF Counter-Terrorist Bomb Disposal Unit Bomb suit personal and Equipment

- Unibuffel – Mine-protected APC
- Land Rover Defender
- Unicorn APC
- P2 APC

=== Amphibious vehicles ===
- Disaster Management Amphibious Multi Unit Vehicles

== Weapons ==
Mortars

- Type 84 (W84) 82 mm mortars
- Type 89 60 mm mortars

Small arms

Handguns

- Glock 17
- Beretta 92
- Smith & Wesson M&P
- M1911 pistol
- Browning Hi-Power

Assault Rifles

- Type 56 assault rifle
- CAR-15
- M4 carbine
- SR 88
- QBZ-95
- FN FNC
- Type 81 assault rifle

Sub-machine guns

- Heckler & Koch MP5 and its variants (MP5A1, MP5A2, MP5A3, MP5K, MP5SD)
- Uzi Submachine Guns

Sniper Rifles

- Heckler & Koch PSG1 Sniper Rifles
- Heckler & Koch G3 (modified as a sniper rifle)
- AIAW sniper rifles
- IWI Galatz (sniper version of IMI Galil)
- Zastava M93 Black Arrow

Grenade launchers

- M203 Grenade launcher
- Heckler & Koch HK69A1 grenade launcher
- Milkor MGL

Rocket launchers

- Type 69 RPG Rocket launchers (Chinese version of RPG-7)
- RPG-7
- M72 LAW

Missile launchers

- SA-18 Missile launcher

Machine guns

- Ultimax 100 LMG
- Type 80 GPMG (Chinese version of Soviet PKM)
- PKM
- Heckler & Koch HK21 GPMG
- IWI Negev
- Type 56 RPD LMG
