= P2 (armoured vehicle) =

Commando

SSE P2
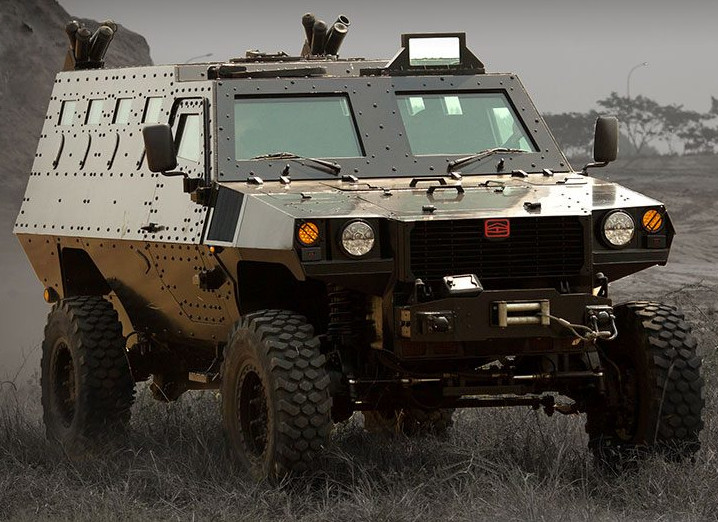
- P2 APC variant.
- Type: Armored car
- Place of origin: Indonesia

Production history
- Manufacturer: SSE Defence
- Produced: 2004 – present

Specifications
- Mass: 3,520 kilograms (7,760 lb) (empty); 4,500 kilograms (9,900 lb) (combat)
- Length: 3,890 mm (153.1 in)
- Width: 2,010 mm (79.1 in)
- Height: 1,950 mm (76.8 in)
- Crew: 2 + 2 troops
- Armor: STANAG 4569 level 1 to level 3, V-shape body
- Main armament: 7.62 to 12.7 mm machinegun
- Engine: Peugeot XD3T 2.5 L turbodiesel I4; 130 horsepower (97 kW)
- Operational range: 500 km
- Maximum speed: 130 kilometres per hour (81 mph)

The P2 is an Indonesian armored car produced by PT Sentra Surya Ekajaya (SSE Defence).

== Design ==
The P2 has a design similar to the French-made Panhard VBL 4×4 which is now used by the Indonesian Army Cavalry Company. In 2004, 2 units of P2 Pakci was produced for SAT-81 Gultor (a Kopassus detachment). APC variant has been around since at least 2006, while the commando variant's first public appearance was in the 2012 Indo Defense event. The P2 is equipped with a semi-open turret that can be mounted on a 7.62 mm caliber GPMG or 5.56 mm FN Minimi mount. Bearing the title of armored, the entire body, including the glass is said to be able to withstand the impact of 7.62 mm caliber projectiles. In NATO standards armor resistance is up to level III. The P2 Commando with a combat weight of 4.5 tons has been prepared to easily fit into the cargo compartment of the C-130 Hercules transport aircraft. The engine is supported by a 130 hp turbo diesel engine with an intercooler. With full tank, the P2 Commando can roam up to 500 km.

== Variants ==
=== P2 Pakci ===
Earliest type produced.

=== P2 Commando ===
Also known as P2 Cougar. It has a dimension of L×W×H: 4009×1900×1781 mm. The empty weight is 3 tons, powered by KE – Turbo Diesel, 4000 cc (145 hp). It can reach a maximum speed of more than 140 km/h. The P2 is designed with optional amphibious capability, like Panhard VBL.

=== P2 Commando 2 ===
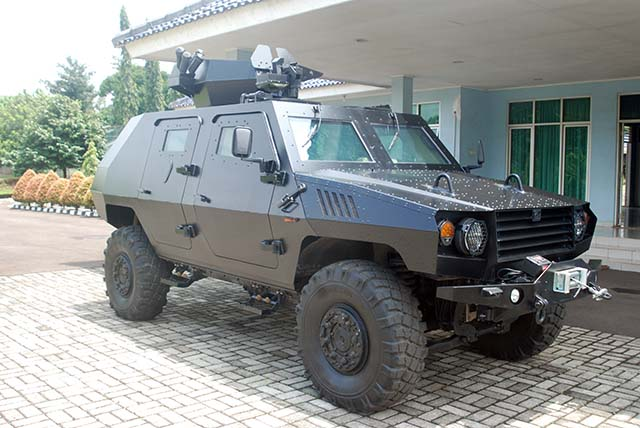
P2 Commando 2 of Indonesian Paskhas.

The second generation of P2 Commando, equipped with an Iveco F1D diesel engine that produces 182 hp. Vehicles can be driven on flat roads up to a speed of 130 km/h. Manned by four people, it has full protection against projectile impacts up to 7.62 mm caliber. For self-defense, this vehicle can carry 7.62 mm or 12.7 mm caliber machine guns mounted in the gun turret on the roof.

=== P2 APC ===
Armoured personnel carrier variant. This variant has been exported to Sri Lanka in 2006. Specifications:

Crew: 2+8 troops

Length: 5,500 mm

Width: 2,260 mm

Height: 2,210 mm

Wheel base: 3.4 m

Empty weight: 5.52 tons

Combat weight: 7 tons

Engine: Diesel 180 Hp

Range: 800 km

Gradient: 60%

Side slope: 40%

Obstacle: 0.30 meter

Fording: 0.70 meter

Armor protection: STANAG Level III

Air transport: C-130

=== P2 - KM ===
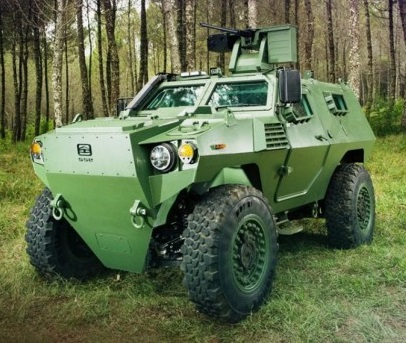
P2 KM

Armoured reconnaissance variant, first revealed during Indo Defence 2018. Using Steyr M16 3200 cc engine generating 217 hp of power, it is crewed by only 3 men: Driver, commander, and gunner. It is offered to replace aging VBL of Indonesian army, but an amphibious version also being offered to Indonesian navy, equipped with propellers.

== Users ==
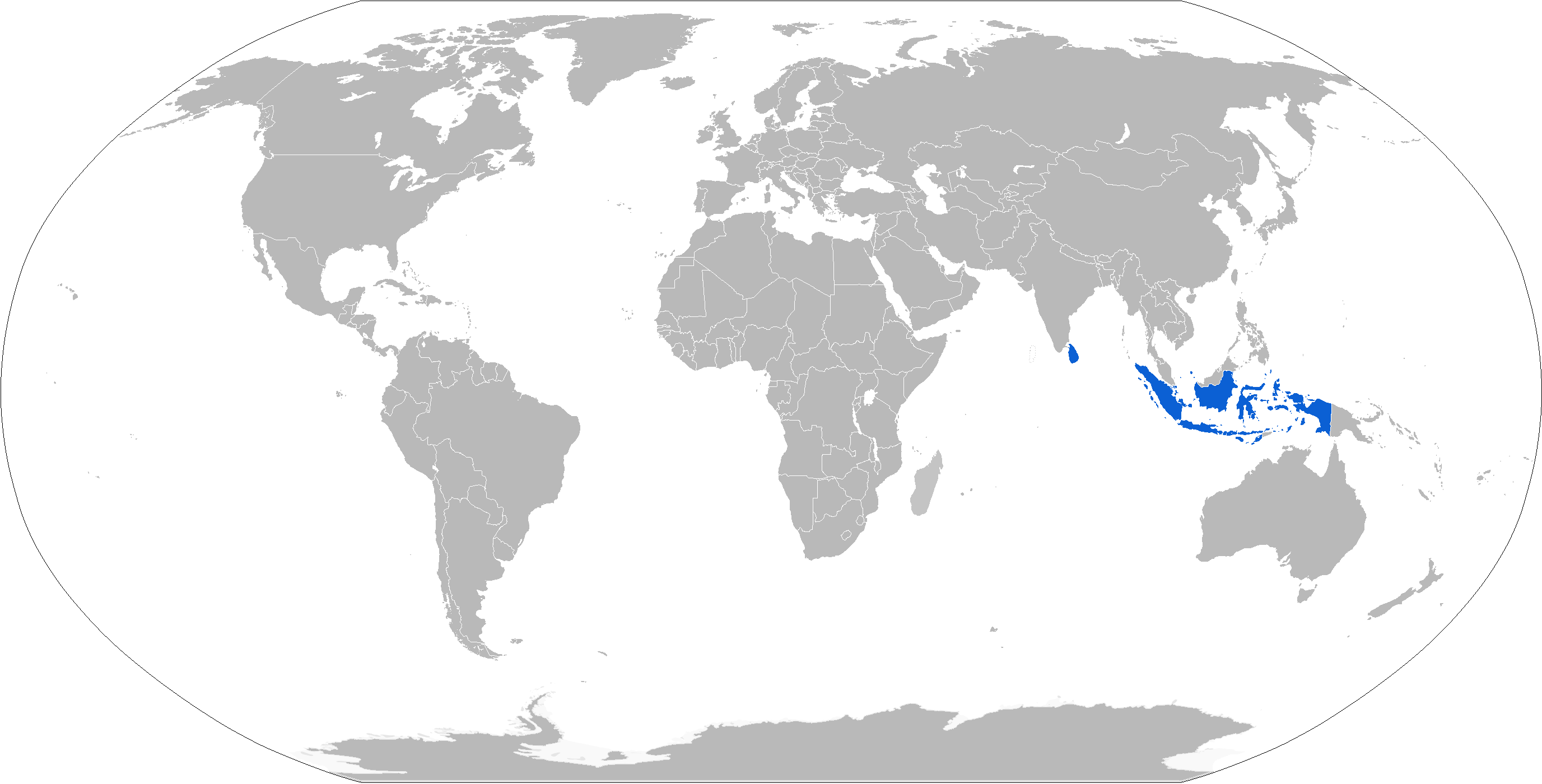

- Indonesia: Used by Kopaska and Paskhas. Presidential security force has 5 unit commando and 5 unit APC variant.
- Sri Lanka

== See also ==
- Komatsu LAV
- Véhicule Blindé Léger
