= Unicob =

UniCOB
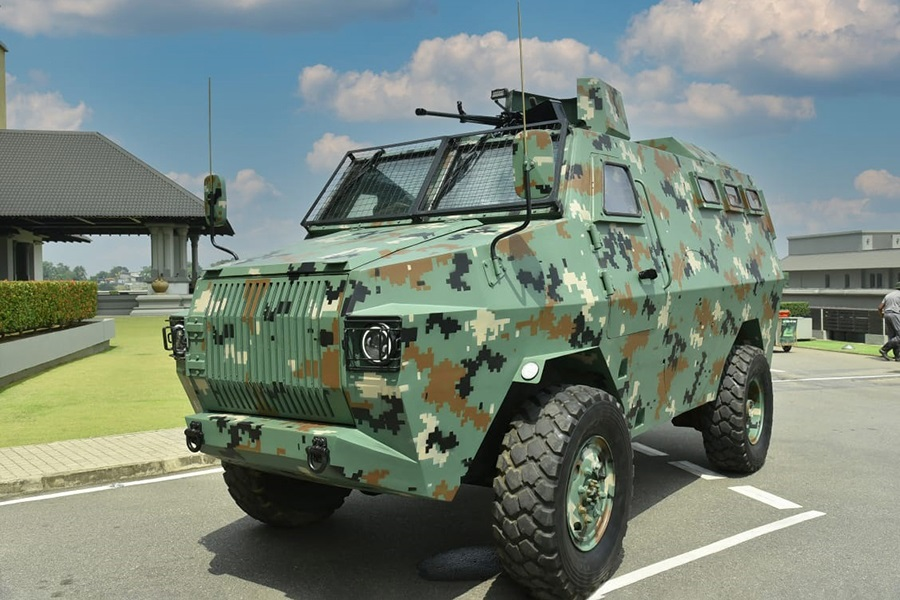
- Type: Mine-Resistant Ambush Protected Vehicle
- Place of origin: Sri Lanka

Service history
- In service: 2021 – present
- Used by: Sri Lanka army

Production history
- Designer: Sri Lanka Electrical and Mechanical Engineers
- Manufacturer: Sri Lanka Electrical and Mechanical Engineers
- Unit cost: LKR 10 000 000 (US$37.950)
- Produced: 2021 – present

Specifications
- Mass: 13 t
- Length: 5760mm
- Width: 2290mm
- Height: 3250mm
- Crew: 9 (Driver, Gunner, Commander + 6 Passengers)
- Main armament: 12.7 mm W85 machine gun
- Engine: 697 NA water-cooled direct injection diesel engine 130 hp
- Maximum speed: 72kmph in paved road

UniCOB, also known as Unicob, is a Sri Lankan 4x4 Mine-Resistant Ambush Protected Vehicle (MRAPV) produced by the Sri Lanka Electrical and Mechanical Engineers.

== History ==
Unicob began manufacturing in 2021 and was first publicly unveiled in February 2022 during Independence Day celebrations.

Initially, production of ten units is planned. But a demand for around fifty vehicles is expected.

== Design ==
The Unicob is a 4x4 vehicle with a capacity for 9 including driver, gunner and commander designed to withstand the impact of land mines and small arms fire. Units are equipped with an all-direction surveillance system and field to command real-time communication and monitoring capability as well as a fully air conditioned crew cabin. As it is designed to make use of locally available spare parts, it has much lower production and maintenance costs compared to imported equivalents.

It is armed with a turret for a 12.7mm machine gun. The vehicle is capable of handling disaster relief and MEDEVAC operations.
