= Unicorn APC =

Unicorn
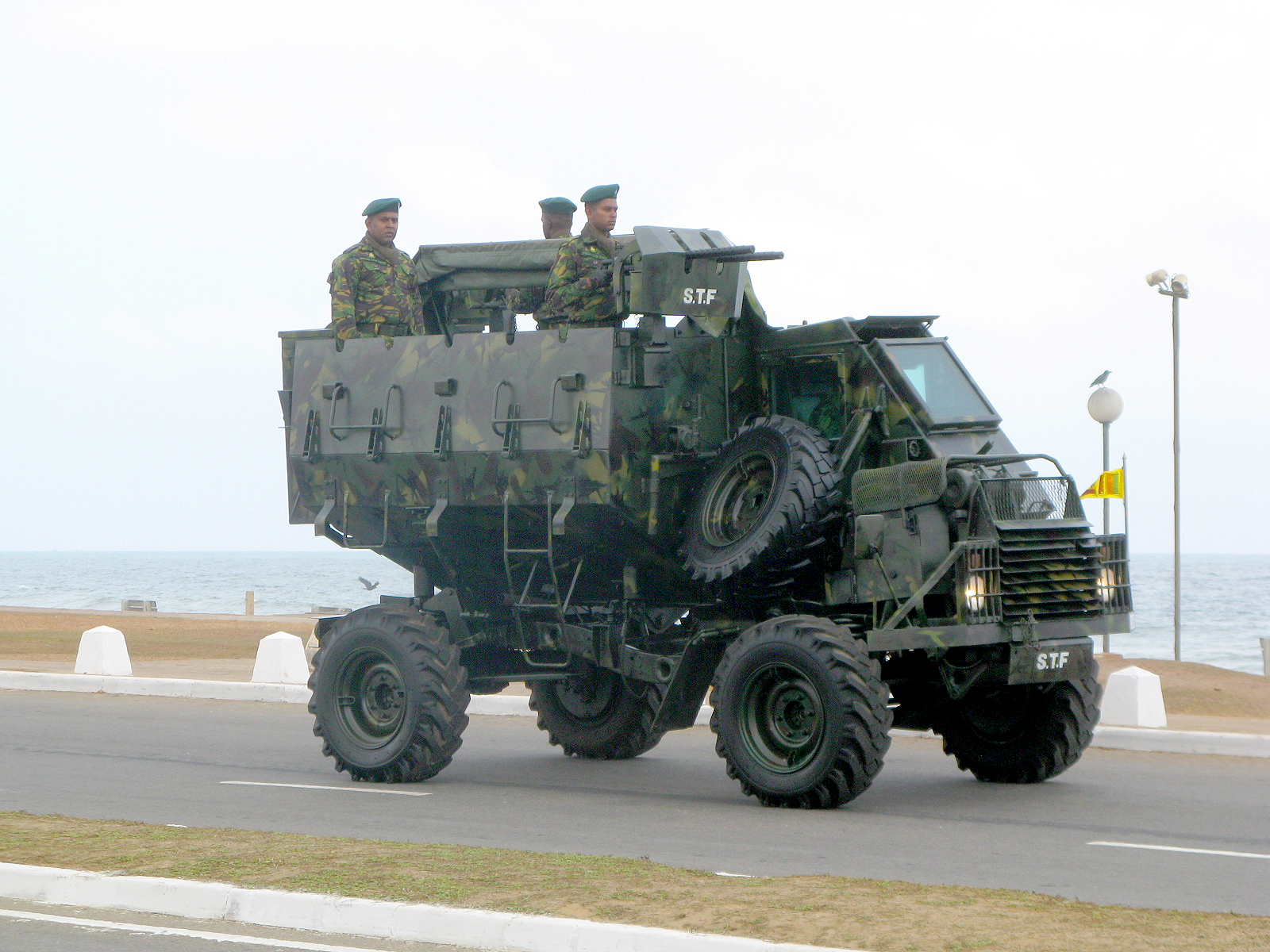
- A STF Unicorn
- Type: Armoured personnel carrier
- Place of origin: Sri Lanka

Service history
- In service: 1987–present
- Used by: See Operators
- Wars: Sri Lankan Civil War

Production history
- Designer: Sri Lanka Electrical and Mechanical Engineers
- Designed: 1985
- Manufacturer: Sri Lanka Electrical and Mechanical Engineers
- Produced: 1987–Present
- Variants: Mark I to Mark VI

Specifications
- Mass: 5.8 t
- Length: 4.8 m (16.73 ft)
- Width: 2 m (6.73 ft)
- Height: 2.6 m (9.68 ft)
- Crew: 2 + 12 passengers
- Armor: Classified
- Main armament: Twin 7.62mm MG (front)
- Engine: Diesel Engine
- Suspension: 4×4 wheeled
- Operational range: 1000 km (621.37 mi)
- Maximum speed: Road 96km/h (59.61 mph); Off-road 30km/h (18.64 mph)

The Unicorn is a MRAP used by the Sri Lankan military based on the Buffel, which is made by the Sri Lanka Electrical and Mechanical Engineers.

== History ==
Initial research into producing a "Blast Protected Vehicle" armoured personnel carrier was led by then Major Jayantha de Silva, who was concerned by the destruction caused by the Improvised Explosive Devices (IEDs) that the Tamil rebels began using on military troop transport vehicles. These IEDs became rampant in the north and eastern provinces with the escalation of the Sri Lankan Civil War. The many experiments Major de Silva carried out showed that explosive force dissipates in proportion to the distance travelled.

The research led to the production of vehicles based on a TATA commercial truck chassis with a strong metal hull about two metres from ground level in 1983, which was known under the name Yaka. It resulted in the backing of then-Minister for National Security, Hon Lalith Athulathmudali, who co-opted all engineering firms in Sri Lanka to build the vehicles to the specifications drafted by Major de Silva. The project was then handed over to the Electrical and Mechanical Engineers of the Army.

When the rebels found that their IEDs were ineffective against the Unicorns, they stopped using them and the production of these vehicles ceased. The rebels began using them again about two years later, and as the Army found itself short of suitable vehicles, a few consignments of the South African-made Buffel vehicles were imported, even though they provided protection only against land mines and proved ineffective against the IEDs. Further development continued in 1985, by both the Sri Lanka Electrical and Mechanical Engineers (SLEME) of the Sri Lanka Army and the General Engineering Wing of the Sri Lanka Air Force. Both designs were based on the South African Buffels which had been bought in 1985.

The air force developed its own APC for the SLAF Regiment in small numbers. SLEME developed the Unicorn Mark I by 1987, which, too, were produced in large numbers by SLEME for the Sri Lanka Army and for the other services as well.

In October 2024, the Unicorns were used with Unibuffels for humanitarian operations due to widespread flooding.

=== Combat history ===
It was known to be used in the 1990s during the civil war.

== Design ==
A distinct feature of the Unicorn was that the driver-passenger compartment was undivided. According to soldiers in the battlefield, this feature made communication among the two sections easier than that in a Buffel where the driver was separated from the passengers.

== Variants ==
There were several models that were developed as a result of continuous upgrading based on combat requirements. These include Unicorn Mark I to Mark VI.

Production continued until 2000 with a total of 93 Unicorns being produced by SLEME with the Mark VI being produced.

While production was largely stopped for the more advanced Unibuffel upgraded and modified ambulance variant of the Mark VI designed in 2010 entered mass production in 2016.

== Operators ==
- Sri Lanka
  - Sri Lanka Army: It's reported that 105 Unicorns are in active service.
  - Sri Lanka Navy
  - Sri Lanka Air Force
  - Special Task Force : Five Unicorns handed to the STF.

== See also ==
- Unibuffel
- Avalon MPV
- UniCOLT
