= UniCOLT =

- Type: 4x4 Truck
- Place of origin: Sri Lanka

Service history
- In service: 2020–present
- Used by: Sri Lanka Army

Production history
- Designer: Sri Lanka Electrical and Mechanical Engineers
- Designed: 2020
- Manufacturer: Sri Lanka Electrical and Mechanical Engineers
- Produced: 2020–Present
- Variants: UniCOLT MPT; UniCOLT GE; UniCOLT WB

Specifications
- Mass: 9500 kg
- Engine: Cummins 6BT 5.9-liter turbocharged diesel engine.
- Suspension: 4×4 wheeled

UniCOLT is a family of 4x4 military logistical vehicles manufactured by the Sri Lanka Electrical and Mechanical Engineers for use by the Sri Lankan Armed Forces.

== Design ==
UniCOLT is almost entire locally manufactured with Sri Lankan made parts except for their engines and chassis and comes in multiple variants for different roles . They are equipped with Air Conditioned Cabins, Audio system with reverse camera, GPS Tracking and Engine overheating sensors.

== Variants ==
- UniCOLT MPT: Multi Purpose Truck variant
- UniCOLT GE: Diesel Gully Emptier with 5000 litre capacity
- UniCOLT WB: Water Bowser variant with a tank capacity of 8000 litres
