= Unibuffel =

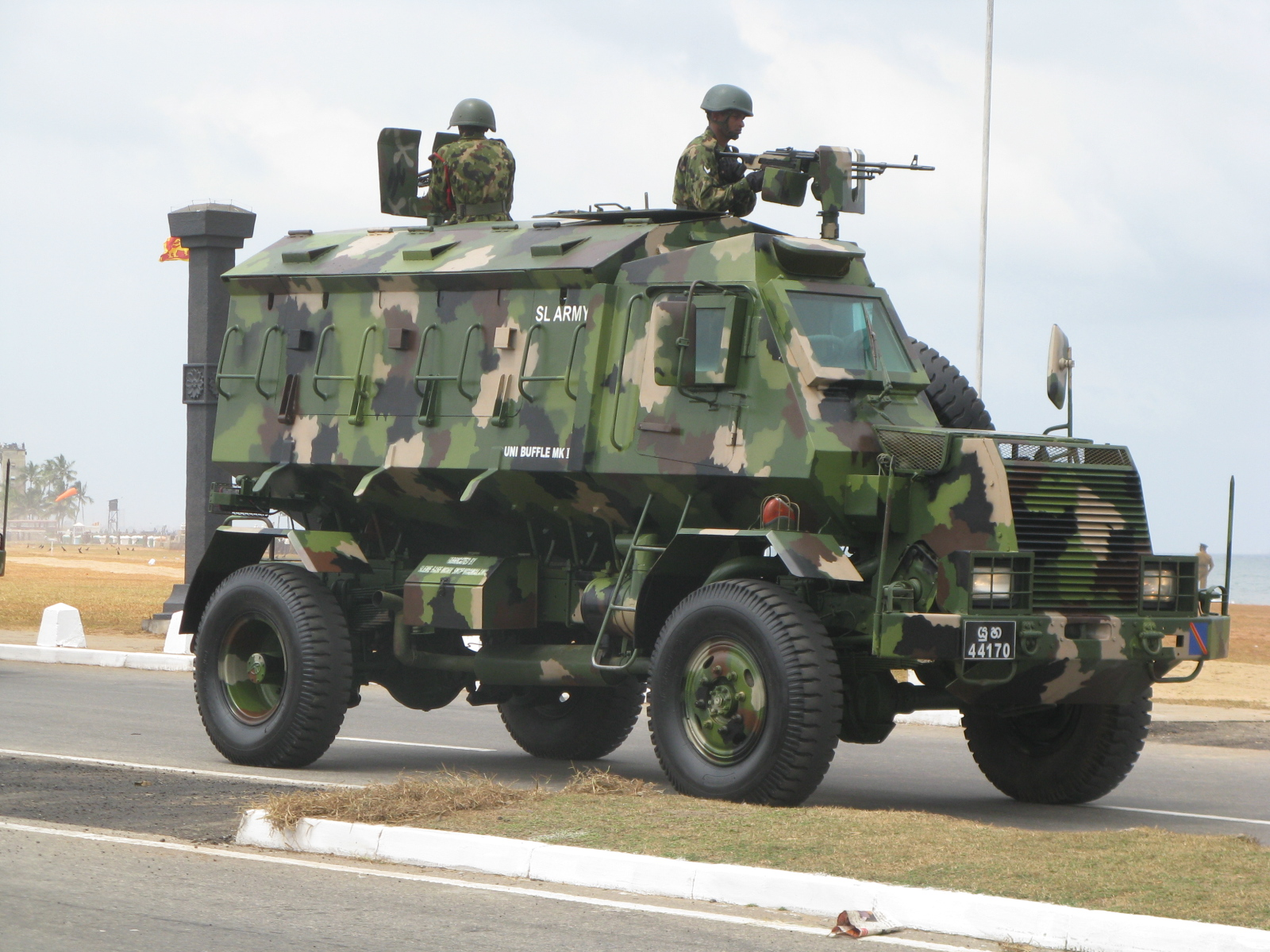
- Unibuffel Mk II of the Sri Lankan Army
- Type: Infantry mobility vehicle
- Place of origin: Sri Lanka

Service history
- In service: 2000 - Present
- Used by: See Operators

Production history
- Designer: Sri Lanka Electrical and Mechanical Engineers
- Manufacturer: Sri Lanka Electrical and Mechanical Engineers
- Unit cost: 3 million rupee ($29,646)
- Produced: 2000 - Present
- Variants: Mark I to Mark II

Specifications
- Mass: 6.14 t
- Length: 5.1 m (16.73 ft)
- Width: 2.05 m (6.73 ft)
- Height: 2.95 m (9.68 ft)
- Crew: 2 + 10 passengers
- Armor: Classified
- Main armament: Twin 7.62mm MG (front)
- Secondary armament: Twin 7.62mm MG (rear)
- Engine: TATA Diesel Engine; Hino V6 Turbo-charged Diesel Engine (MKII Improved Version); 180 hp (MKII Improved Version)
- Suspension: 4×4 wheeled
- Operational range: 1000 km (621.37 mi)
- Maximum speed: 96km/h (59.61 mph) on road 30km/h (18.64 mph) off-road

The Unibuffel is a mine-protected wheeled MRAP Infantry mobility vehicle used by the Sri Lankan military, which is an improved version of the Unicorn, made by the Sri Lanka Electrical and Mechanical Engineers.

More than 53 Unibuffels had been manufactured as of 2006.

== Production history ==
Although similar to the South African Buffel, it is built entirely by the Sri Lanka Electrical and Mechanical Engineers (SLEME). Initial research and development started in 1997 in an effort to field modernized MRAPs in Sri Lankan military service. First production started in 2000.

In 2019, SLEME began to upgrade Unibuffels with blast shock absorption seats and better protection. In 2020, air onditioning was added to those being sent for UN peacekeeping operations in Mali.

=== Combat usage ===
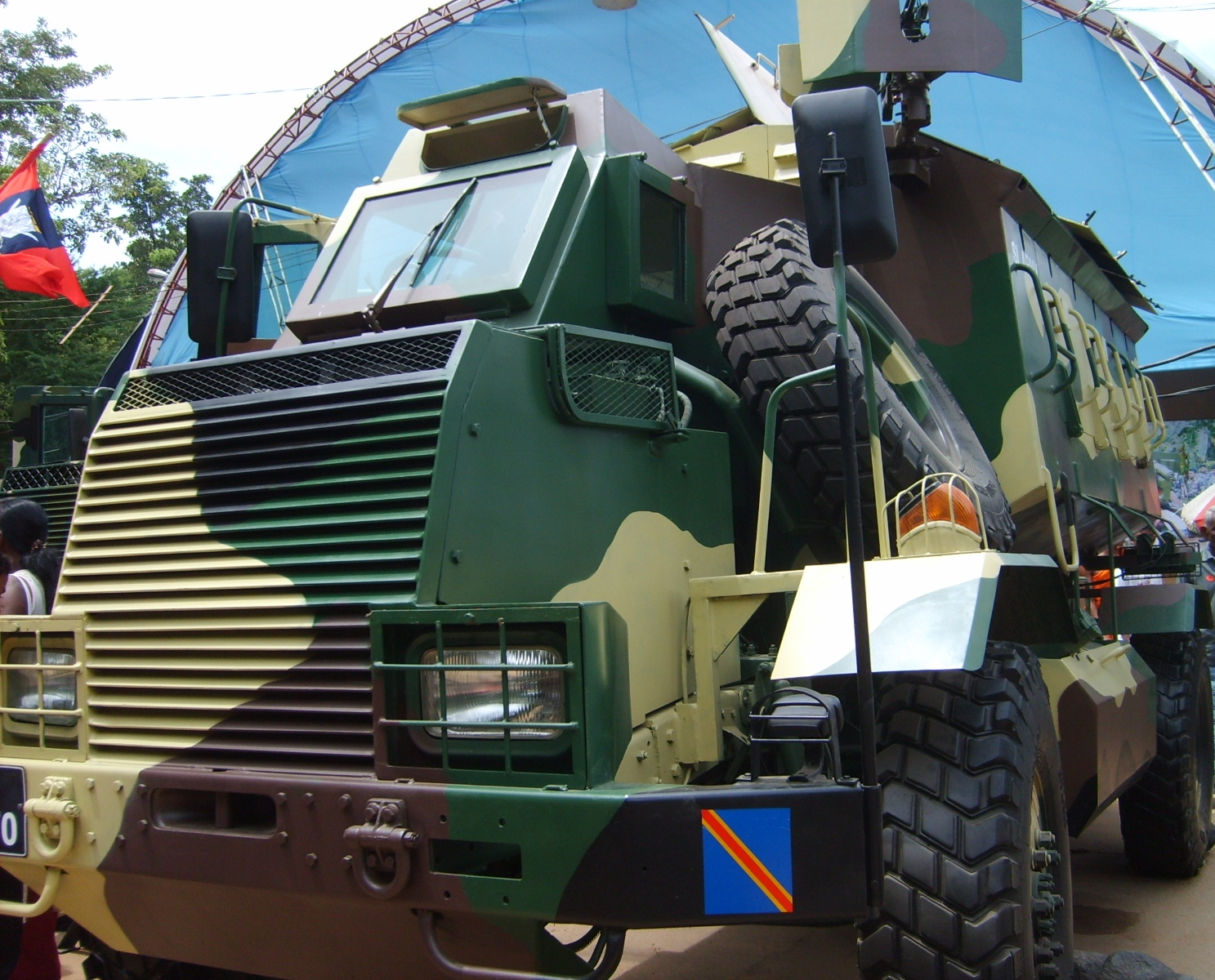
Unibuffel MK II

The Unibuffel proved quite successful in the Sri Lankan civil war, it could transport troops through rough terrain with ease, and had good protection, it participated in all Sri Lankan Army operations 2005 onwards.

When Sri Lankan troops joined United Nations Stabilisation Mission in Haiti, 16 Unibuffels was deployed to serve as their APC.

In June, 2020 nine Unibuffels were deployed to Mali under urgent operational requirements for peacekeeping operations.

== Design ==
The Unibuffel has an enclosed troop compartment and has gun mounts on the front and back to equip it with machine guns. The Typhoon 25mm cannon can also be equipped as a port defense weapon on a flatbed version.

Vehicles were powered by a TATA engine which can deal easily with rough terrain. Bulletproof glass was initially imported from China on a needed basis but later versions use glass manufactured by local suppliers. For the Unibuffels used in Mali, they were equipped with air conditioning.

== Variants ==
The variants of the Unibuffel consist of following categories,

- Mark I
- Mark II
- Mark II Improvised Version (Designed and Manufactured for UN Peacekeeping Missions)

== Operators ==
- Sri Lanka
  - Sri Lanka Army
  - Sri Lanka Navy: Known to be used by the Naval Patrolmen.
  - Sri Lanka Air Force
  - Special Task Force: 15 Unibuffels handed to the STF.

== See also ==
- Unicorn APC
- Avalon MPV
- UniCOLT
- Unicob
