= Buffel =

Infantry mobility vehicle

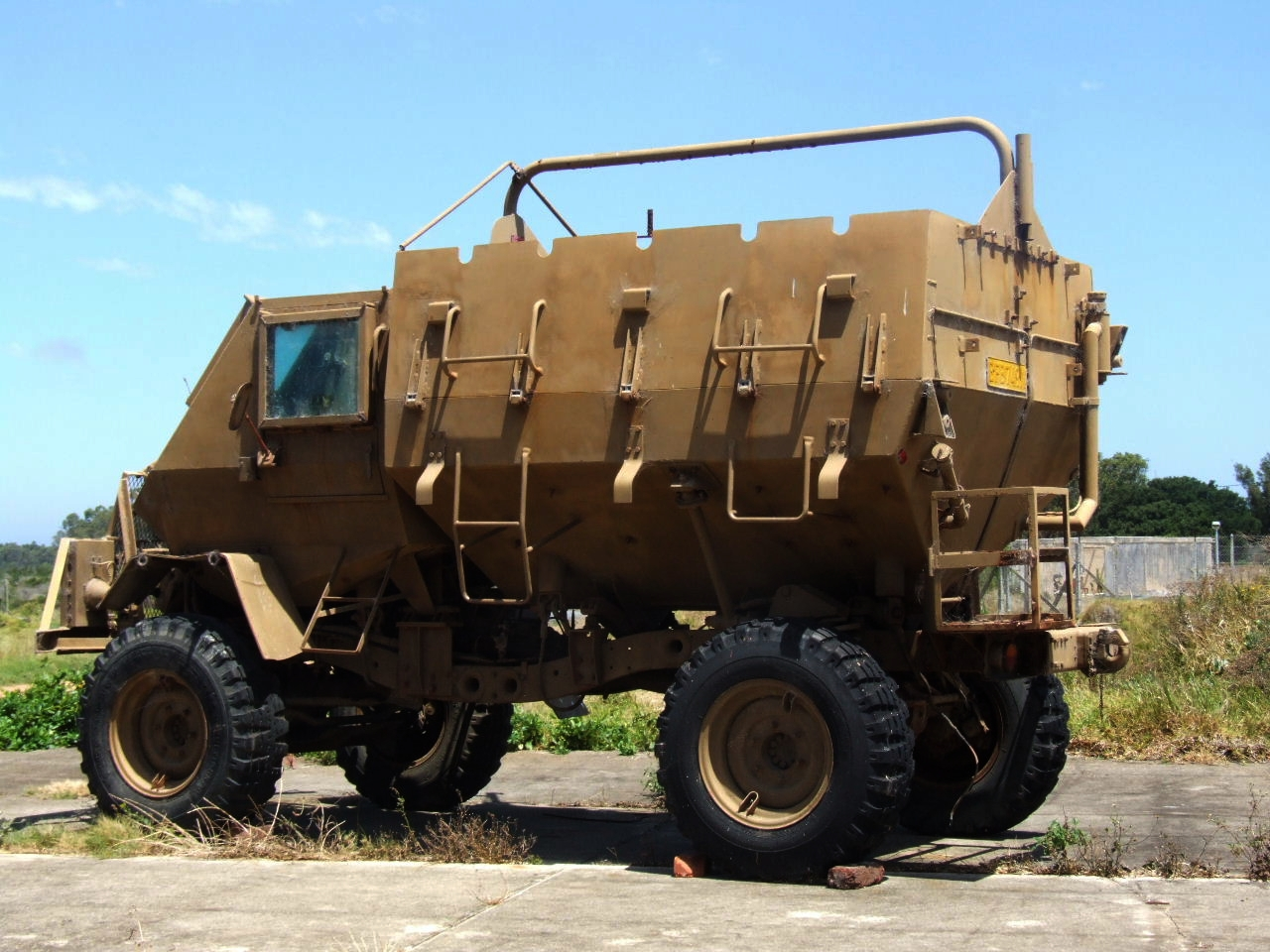
- Decommissioned Buffel in Port Elizabeth.
- Type: MPAV
- Place of origin: South Africa

Production history
- Designer: Council for Scientific and Industrial Research

Specifications
- Mass: 6.14 t
- Length: 5.1 m (16.73 ft)
- Width: 2.05 m (6.73 ft)
- Height: 2.95 m (9.68 ft)
- Crew: 1+10
- Main armament: Optional M1919A4 / FN MAG 7.62 mm MG
- Suspension: 4×4 wheeled
- Operational range: 1000 km (620 mi)
- Maximum speed: Road 96 km/h (60 mph); Off-road 30 km/h (19 mph)

The Buffel (English: Buffalo) is an infantry mobility vehicle used by the South African Defence Force during the South African Border War. The Buffel was also used as an armoured fighting vehicle and proved itself in this role. It replaced the older Bedford RL-based Hippo APC and itself was replaced by the Mamba from 1995 in South Africa, but remains in use elsewhere, notably Sri Lanka.

== Production history ==
The Buffel was the first truly effective landmine-protected armored personnel carrier to enter service anywhere. The South African Army began deploying it in the operational area from 1978. The Buffel was an improvement over the Bosvark which offered little protection to the driver. In 1974, 54 Mercedes-Benz Unimog 416–162 chassis had been hastily converted into Bosvarks by 61 Base Workshops in Pretoria. The Bosvark offered limited landmine protection to the crew, but compensated for this with good off-road mobility. It is estimated that around 2,400 Buffels were delivered before production stopped. Sri Lanka purchased Buffels in the 1980s, and in the early 1990s the vehicle was exported to Uganda.

The Buffel (Afrikaans for Buffalo) was not a wholly South African built vehicle, but made use of the chassis, engine and some other components of the Mercedes-Benz U416-162 Unimog, which were fitted with a domestically designed armoured driver's cab and separate armoured troop compartment. The cab was situated on the left with the engine compartment on the right. Later models replaced the original Mercedes-Benz OM352 engine with copies built under license by Atlantis Diesel Engines factory near Cape Town.

Land mine protection was provided by the V-shaped hull underneath these compartments, which quite effectively deflected the blast. The troop compartment contained two plastic tanks in the V-shape beneath the floor: a 200-litre fuel tank and a 100-litre water tank. The water tank provided drinking water to the occupants by means of a tap at the rear of the vehicle.

In order to help dissipate the energy from hitting a mine, the large tyres were sometimes filled with water, adding about 500 kg per wheel to the vehicle weight.

== Variants ==
SAA variants

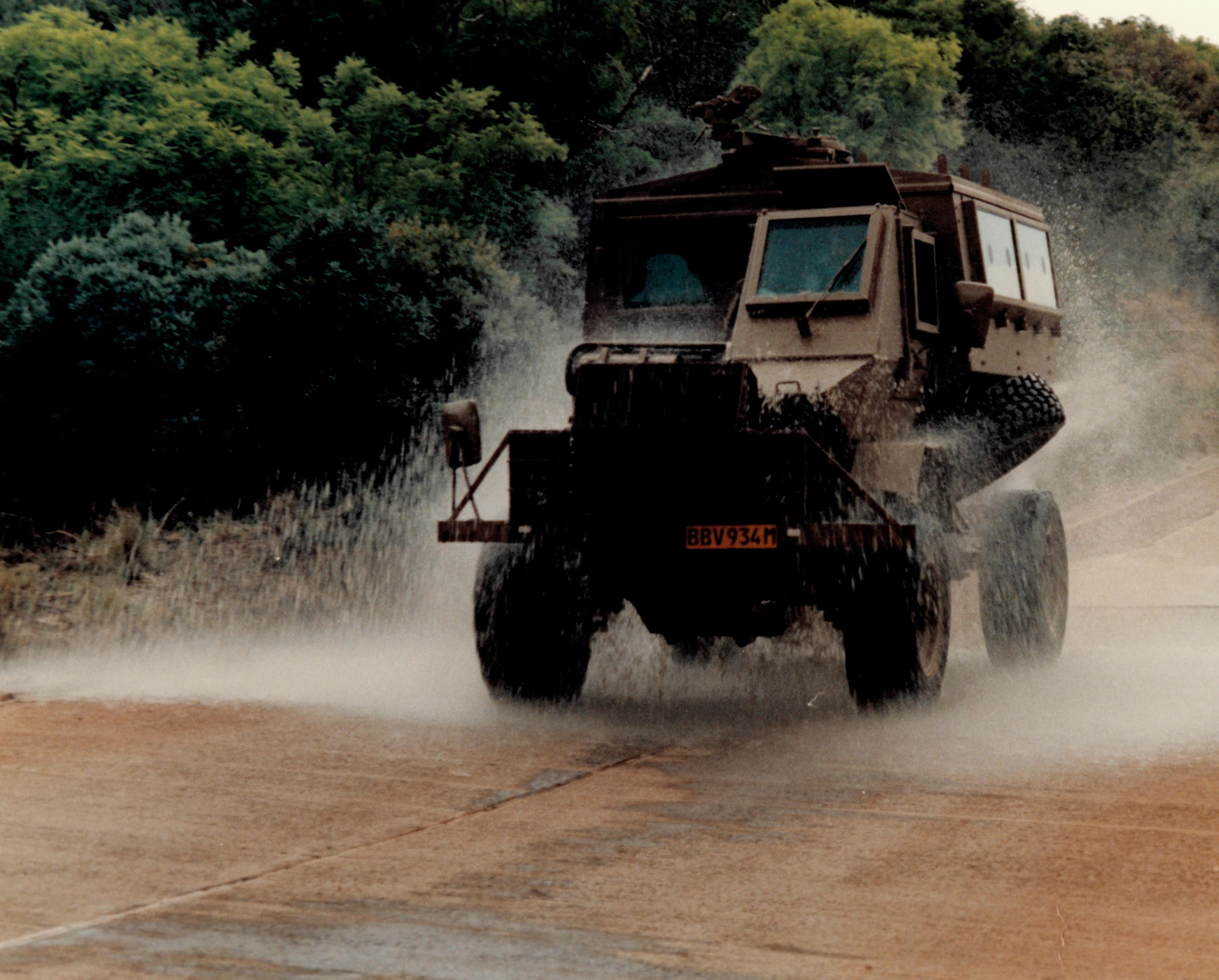
Buffel Mk IIA at the Gerotek Test site.

- Buffel - original
- Buffel Mk 1 - Improved engine and bush guard (bumper)
- Buffel Mk 1B - Disc brakes replaced drum brakes
- Log Buffel - Logistic/Cargo version, a standard Buffel with the seat assembly removed from the troop compartment
- Buffel Mk IIA - Essentially a rebuild of earlier Mk 1s with an enclosed troop compartment, a rear exit door and large bulletproof windows on the sides and rear. Referred to as Moffel.
- Buffel Mk IIB - Cargo carrier. The SA Army ordered 57 of these in the early 1980s. Payload capacity stated as 2.637 tons.

SAAF variants

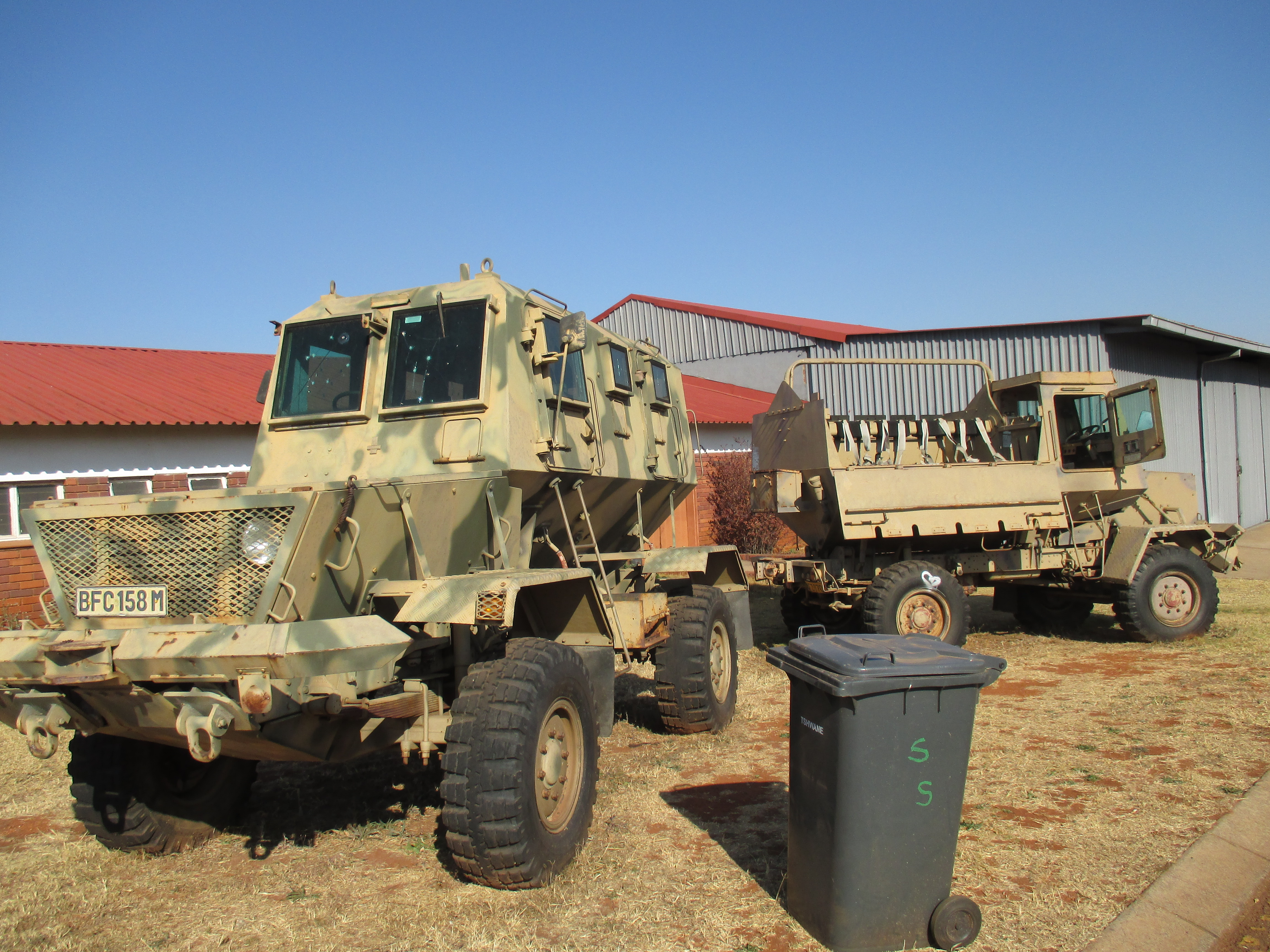
Rhino (left) and Bulldog (right) of the South African military, Swartkop Air Force Base.

- Bulldog - based on SAMIL 20 truck with the driver's cab on the right. The Bulldog was utilized by the SAAF for patrolling airfields. A variant called the Ystervark was produced and used in the anti-aircraft role.
- Rhino - A further development of the Bulldog but with the driver seated inside a fully enclosed troop compartment. 20 were produced for the SAAF.

Sri Lankan variants

- Unicorn - Sri Lanka Army produced version of the Buffel original.

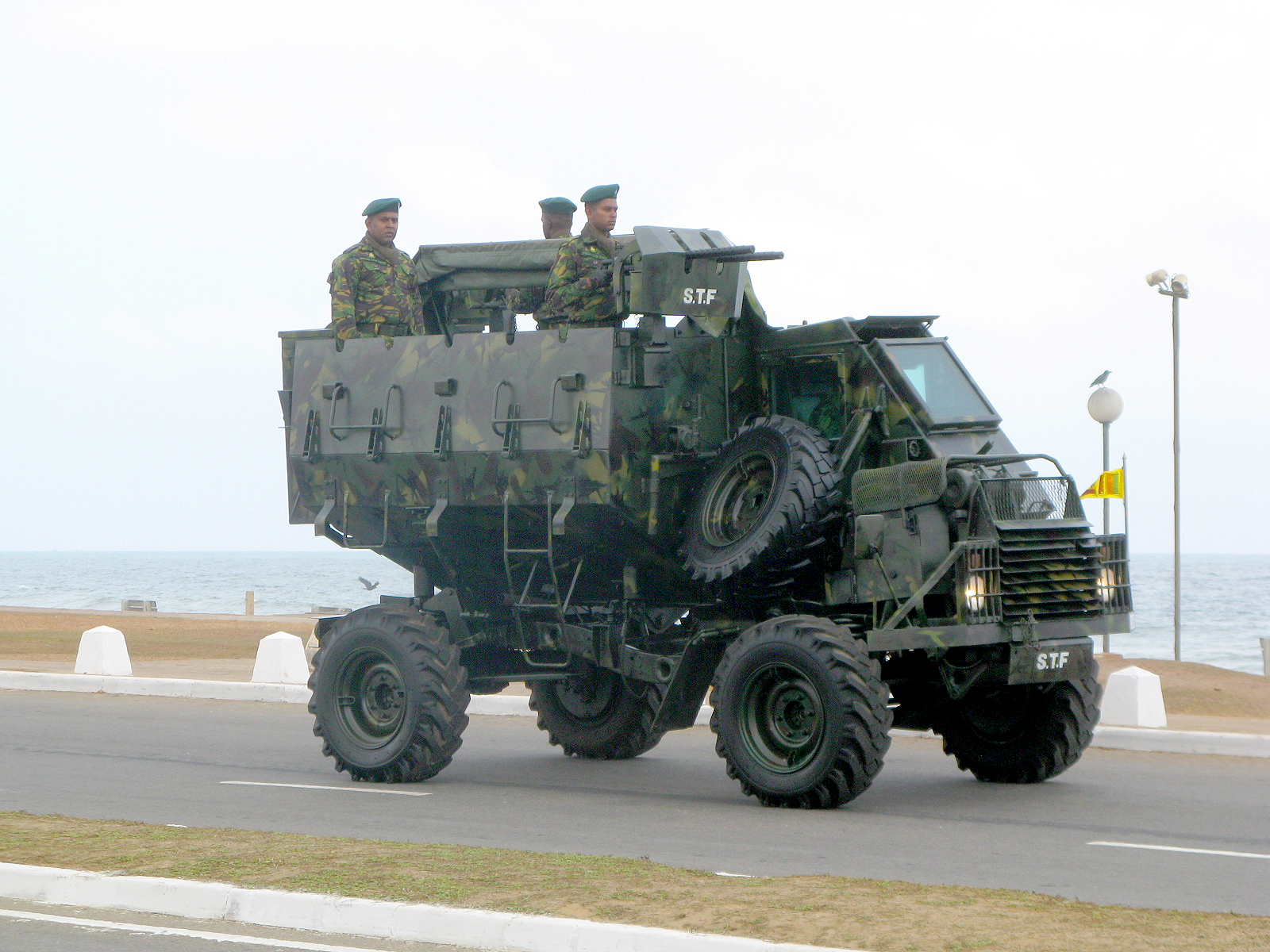
Sri Lanka Police Special Task Force Unicorn

- Unibuffel - Sri Lanka Army produced version of the Mk I and Mk II with Tata and Leyland engine and an enclosed troop compartment.

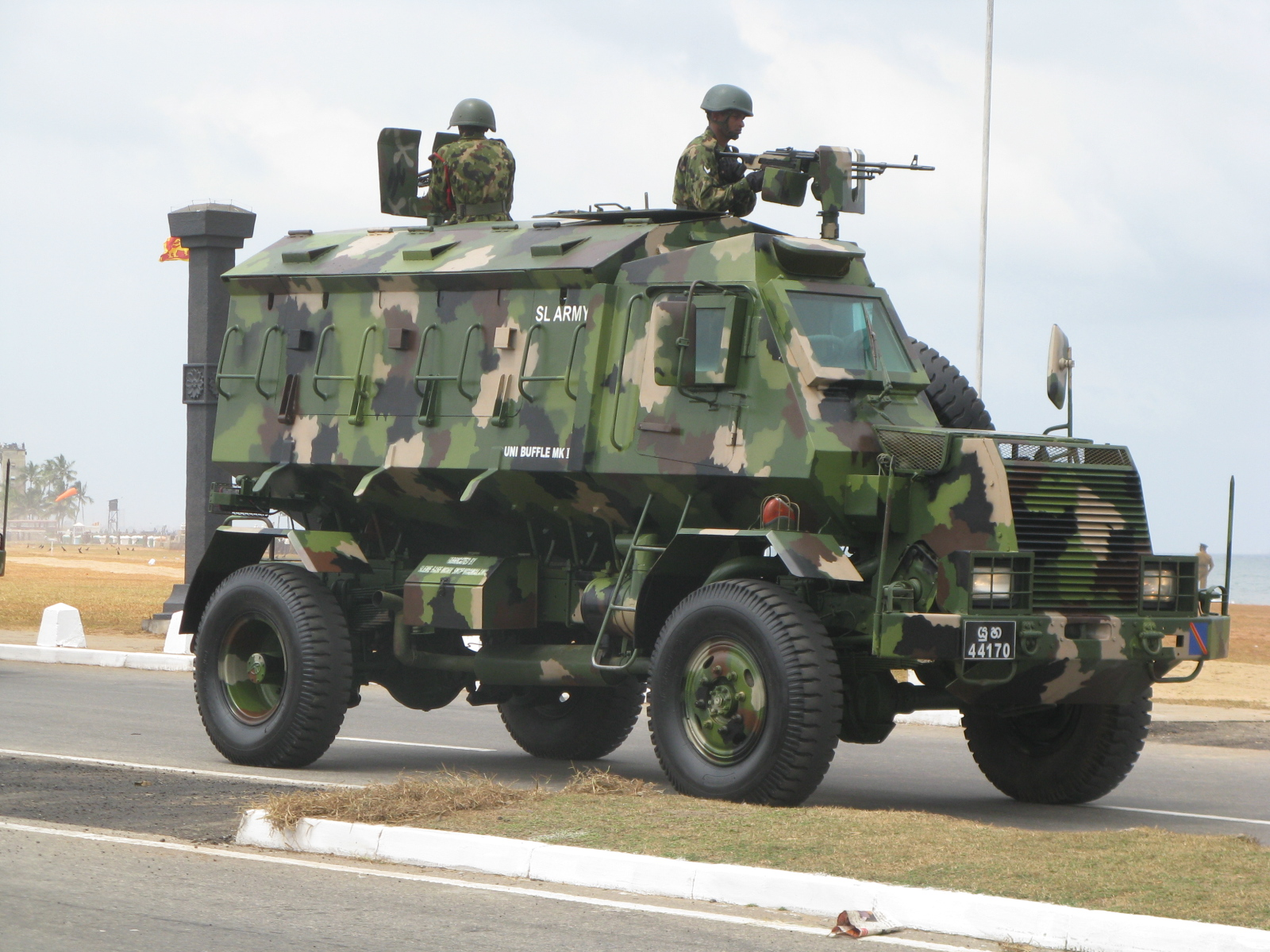
Unibuffel Mk II of the Sri Lankan Army

== Operators ==
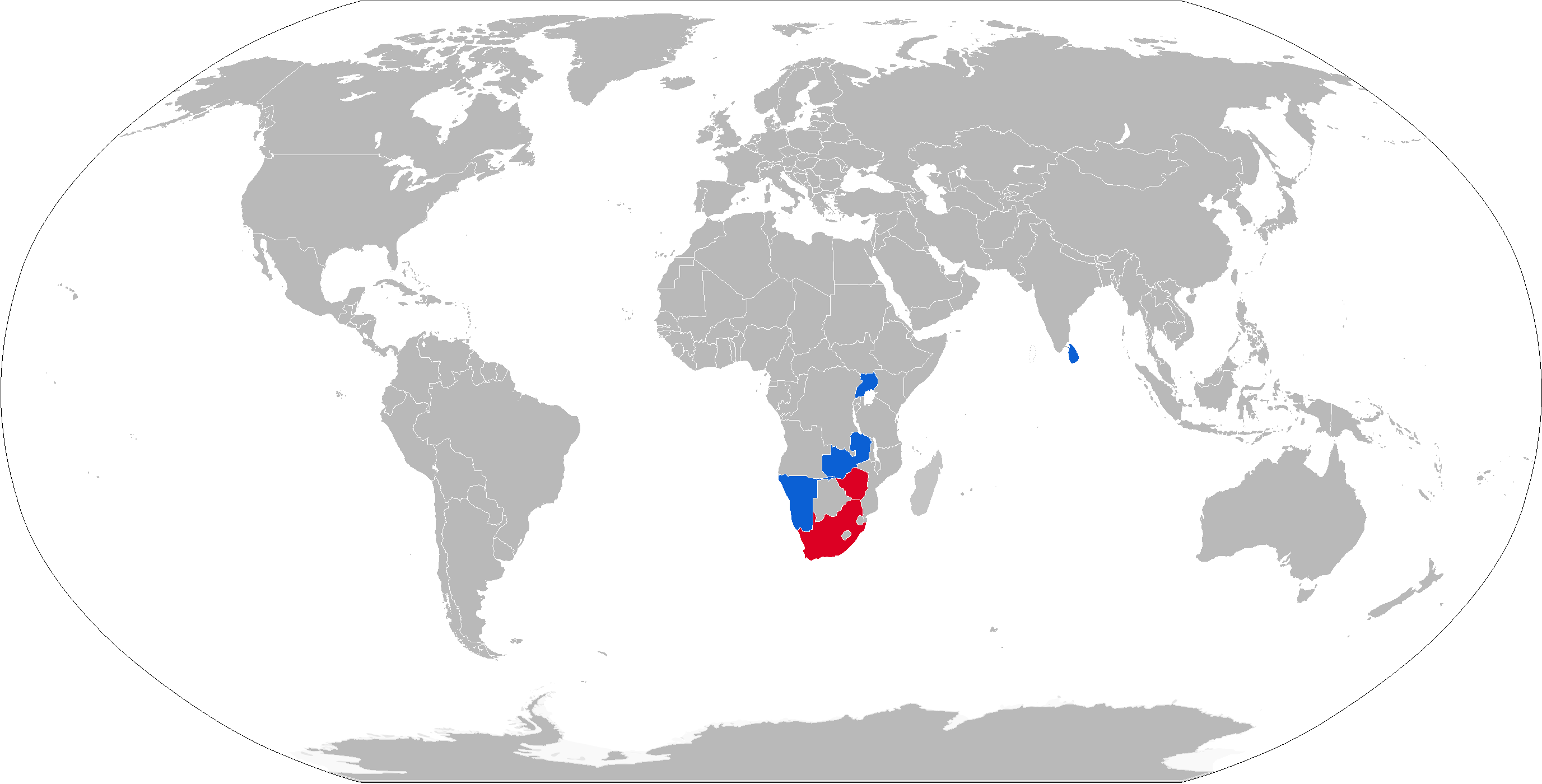
Map with Buffel operators in blue with former operators in red

=== Current operators ===
- Malawi: 1; Rhino variant.
- Sri Lanka: 47; other variants produced as the Unicorn and Unibuffel.
- Uganda: 55; 20 in service with the army and 35 in service with the national police.
- United Nations Mission in South Sudan: 3
- Zambia: 1; Rhino variant.
- United Nations Multidimensional Integrated Stabilization Mission in Mali; nine Unibuffels were deployed to Mail under urgent operational requirements for peacekeeping operations in Mali.

=== Former operators ===
- South Africa: Formerly around 2,400 in service; all retired and replaced by the Mamba.
- United Nations Transition Assistance Group: 1
- Zimbabwe: Possibly inherited from Rhodesia.

== Combat history ==
- Rhodesian Bush War
- Angolan Civil War
- South African Border War
- Second Congo War
- Sri Lankan Civil War

== See also ==
=== Vehicles of comparable role, performance, and era ===
- Unibuffel
- Unicorn APC
- Gazelle FRV
- Hippo APC
- Casspir

== Bibliography ==
- Steve Camp & Helmoed-Römer Heitman, Surviving the Ride – A Pictorial History of South African-Manufactured Armoured Vehicles, 30 Degrees South Publishers, Johannesburg (South Africa) 2014. ISBN 978-1-928211-17-4 –
- Jane's Land Warfare Platforms 2014/2015: Logistics, Support & Unmanned ISBN 0710631308 – Jane’s Land Warfare Platforms: Logistics, Support & Unmanned
- Jane's Land Warfare Platforms 2015-2016: Logistics, Support & Unmanned ISBN 0710631723
- Jane's Military Vehicles & Logistics 2004-2005 ISBN 0710626312 – Jane’s Land Warfare Platforms: Logistics, Support & Unmanned
