= Mine-resistant ambush protected vehicle =

Armoured vehicle designed to survive IED explosion

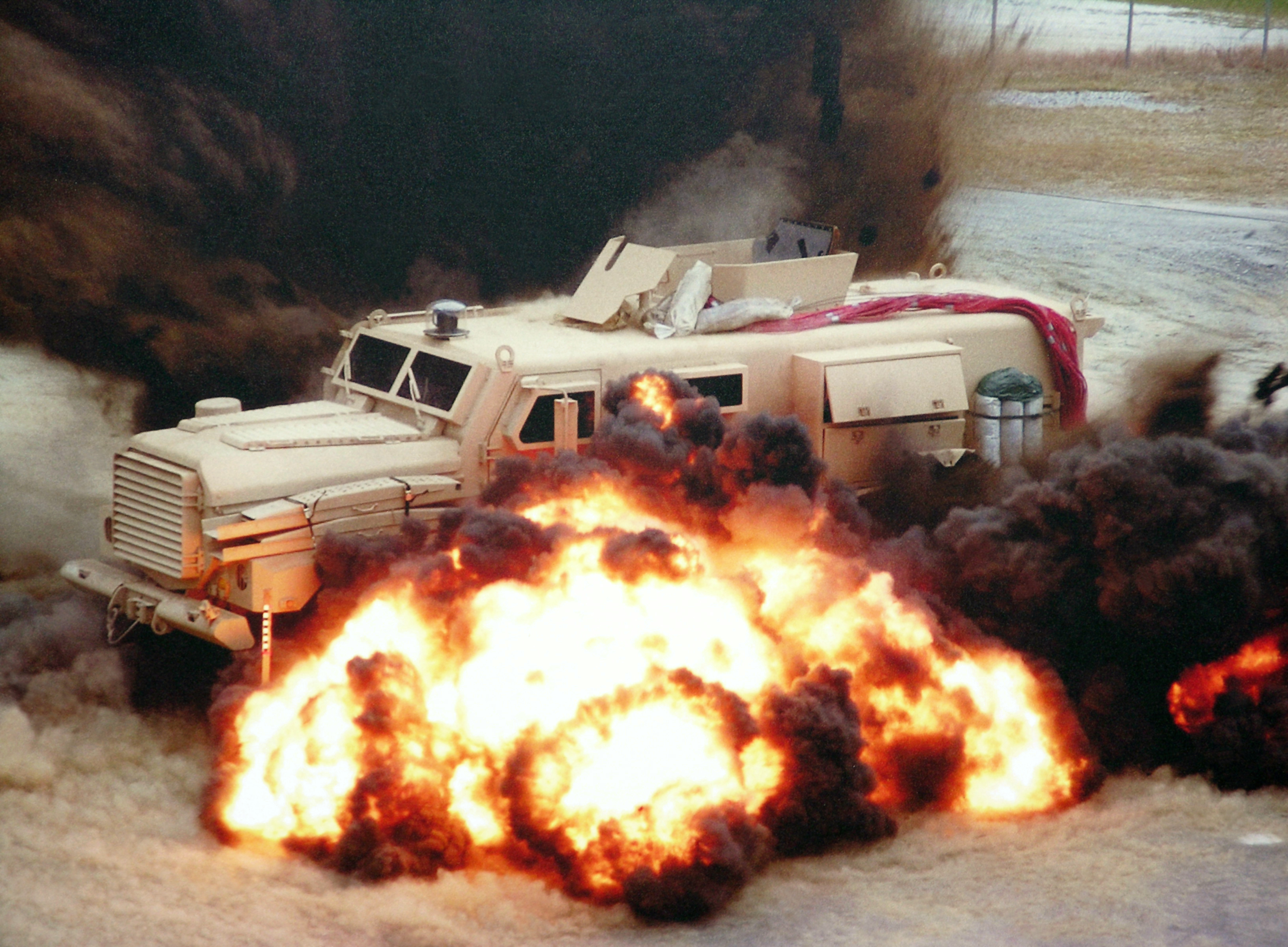
United States-made Cougar HE MRAPV being tested in January 2007 with landmines

Mine-resistant ambush protected vehicle (MRAPV), also known as MRAP vehicle, is a type of armoured personnel carrier that is designed specifically to withstand the impact of land mines, improvised explosive device (IED) attacks, and ambushes. Most modern infantry mobility vehicles also have a certain level of MRAP capabilities.

== History ==
Specialized light armored vehicles designed specifically to resist land mines were first introduced in the 1970s by the Rhodesian Army, and were further developed by South African manufactures in 1974 with the Hippo armored personnel carrier (APC). The first step by the South African Defence Force (SADF) was the Bosvark also known as a kwêvoël 100, a Unimog fitted with a shallow mine-deflecting tub on the chassis to protect the crew. Then came the first generation of purpose-built vehicles, including the Hippo and various other light vehicles. They were essentially armoured V-shaped hulls mounted on truck chassis.

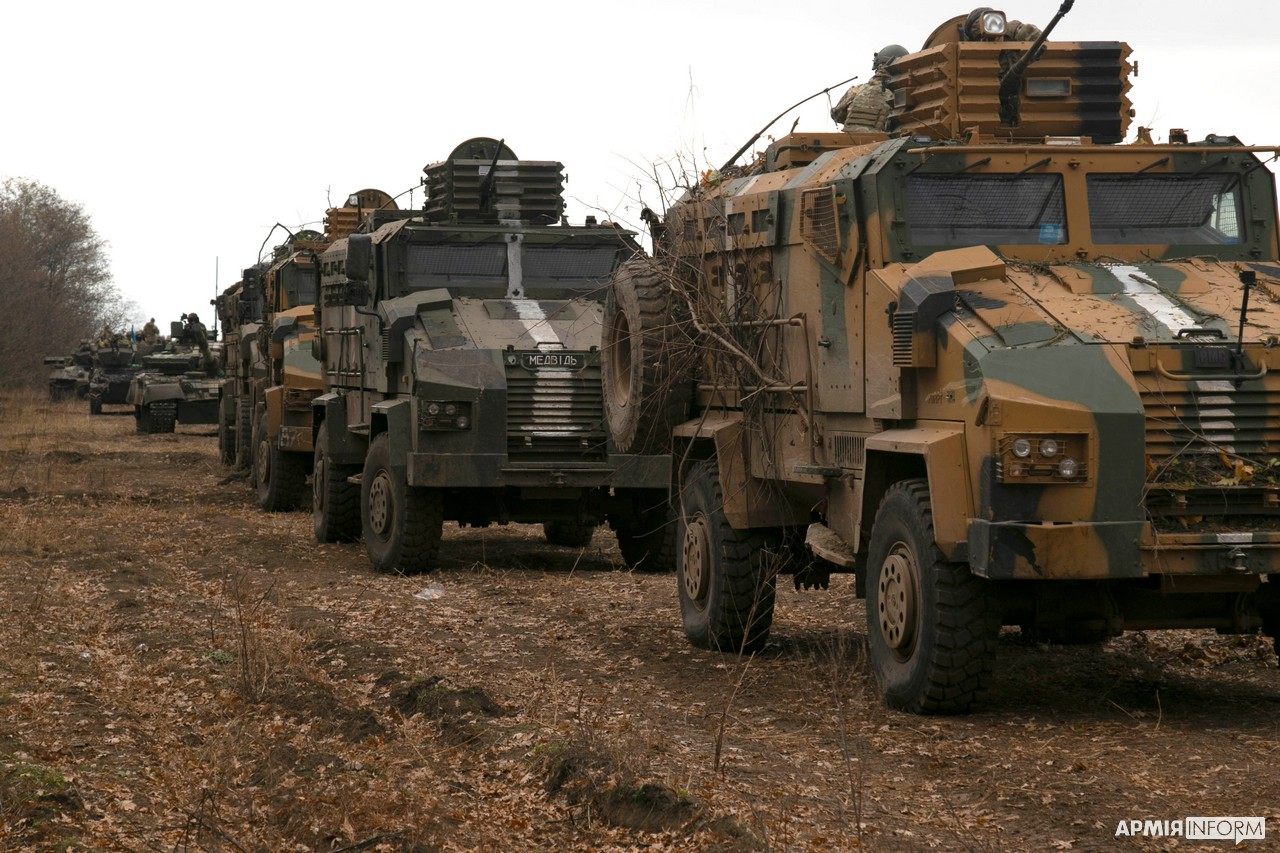
Turkish-made BMC Kirpi in Ukrainian Marine Corps service

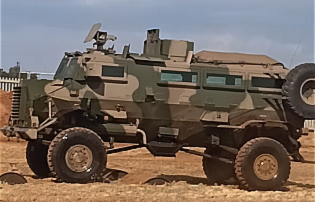
A Image of the South African Casspir MRAP

The next generation was represented by the Buffel, a Unimog chassis with a mine-protected cab and a mine-protected crew compartment mounted on it. These early vehicles overloaded their chassis and were clumsy off-road. The Casspir Mine-Resistant Ambush Protected Vehicle was developed for the SADF in May of 1979 and the first order was placed in 1980; It was commonly used for anti-insurgency operations by SWATF and Koevoet that took place on the border of South West Africa (Namibia), as well as military operations in Angola during the Angolan Civil War and by the South African Police for protest dispersion/ large scale deployment. The Casspir was the inspiration for America's and the other military MRAPV programs and is the basis for most of the program's high grade vehicles.

== Design ==
These vehicles have good off-road mobility, and armor protection against small-arms fire, IEDs, and antipersonnel mines. These armored vehicles generally have a distinctive V-shaped hull (for mine protection) and a wheeled chassis.

== List of MRAP vehicles ==
Dedicated MRAPV
Name	Country of origin	Entered service	Image
Hippo	South Africa	1974	
Buffel	South Africa	1978	
MPCV "Spook"	Rhodesia	1979	
Casspir	South Africa	1979-1981	
Mamba	South Africa	1990	
ATF Dingo	Germany	2000	
Unibuffel	Sri Lanka	2000	
Cougar	United States	2002	
RG-31 Nyala	South Africa	2006	
BAE Caiman	United States	2007	
Gaz Tigr	Russia	2007	
International MaxxPro	United States	2007	
RG-33	South Africa	2007	
Marauder	South Africa	2008	
BMC Vuran	Turkey	2009	
Nexter Aravis	France	2009	
Oshkosh M-ATV	United States	2009	
First Win	Thailand	2010	
Force Protection Ocelot	United Kingdom	2011	
CS/VP3 MRAP	China	2012	
BMC Kirpi	Turkey	2014	
Kamaz Typhoon	Russia	2014	
Protolab Misu	Finland	2017	
Cavalier Hamza	Pakistan	2017	
Roshel Senator	Canada	2018	Roshel Senator
Sisu GTP	Finland	2018	
Toofan	Iran	2018	
Ezugwu MRAP	Nigeria	2019	
JLTV	United States	2019	
Unicob	Sri Lanka	2021	
Kalyani M4	India	2022	
Zastava M20 MRAP	Serbia	2023	

=== Infantry mobility vehicle with MRAP capabilities ===
- AMZ Żubr – (Poland)
- M16 Miloš – (Serbia)
- Bushmaster IMV – (Australia)
- COMBATGUARD – (Israel)
- Didgori series – (Georgia)
- Grizzly APC – (United States)
- Hunter TR-12 – (Colombia)
- Iveco LMV – (Italy) – several thousand ordered by Italian and other European militaries
- Kozak (armored personnel carrier) – (Ukraine)
- Lenco BearCat G5 – (United States)
- Nurol Ejder – (Turkey)
- Mahindra Armored Light Specialist Vehicle – (India)
- Mungo ESK – (Germany)
- Oshkosh L-ATV – (United States) – selected to meet US military's JLTV – (United States) requirement on 25 August 2015
- Otokar Cobra – (Turkey)
- Otokar Cobra II – (Turkey)
- RG-33 – (South Africa) (4×4)
- Roshel Senator – (Canada) – MRAP variant
- Shota – (Albania)
- STREIT Group Spartan – (Canada, Ukraine)
- URO VAMTAC – (Italy)
- Varta – (Ukraine)
