= Kabir Hashim =

Sri Lankan politician and economist

Hon. Kabir Hashim MP
- කබීර් හෂීම් கபீர் ஹாசிம்

General Secretary of United National Party
- In office 8 December 2014 – 5 April 2018
- Leader: Ranil Wickremesinghe
- Preceded by: Tissa Attanayake
- Succeeded by: Palitha Range Bandara

Minister Public Development
- In office 4 September 2015 – 17 November 2019
- President: Maithripala Sirisena
- Prime Minister: Ranil Wickremesinghe

Minister of Highways, Higher Education and Investment Promotion
- In office 12 January 2015 – 22 March 2015
- President: Maithripala Sirisena
- Prime Minister: Ranil Wickremesinghe
- Preceded by: Mahinda Rajapaksa

Minister of Highways and Investment Promotion
- In office 22 March 2015 – 17 August 2015
- President: Maithripala Sirisena
- Prime Minister: Ranil Wickremesinghe

Minister of Tertiary Education, Training

Minister of Higher Education
- In office 2001–2004

Member of Parliament for Kegalle District
- Incumbent
- Assumed office 2001

Personal details
- Born: 19 May 1959 (age 67)
- Party: Samagi Jana Balawegaya (since 2020)
- Other political affiliations: United National Party (before 2020)
- Education: Royal College Colombo, Trinity College, Kandy, University of Kelaniya
- Occupation: Politician and economist

Mohamed Hashim Mohamed Kabir (Sinhala: කබීර් හෂීම්, Tamil: கபீர் ஹாசிம்; born 19 May 1959) popularly known as Kabir Hashim is a Sri Lankan politician and economist. He is a former member of the Parliament of Sri Lanka representing the Kegalle District and former Minister of Highways, Higher Education and Investment Promotion. Kabir was formerly the General Secretary of the United National Party.

Kabir was educated at Royal College Colombo and Trinity College Kandy. Kabir has obtained a Bachelor of Commerce degree with honors from the University of Peradeniya, Sri Lanka.

== Political career ==
Kabir was first elected as Member of Parliament in 2001 and had the highest preferential votes in the Kegalle District in 2004. He also served as Minister of Higher Education under former Prime Minister Ranil Wickremasinghe's Government from 2001 to 2004.

=== General Secretary of United National Party ===
On 8 December 2014, Kabir was appointed as General Secretary of United National Party by Ranil Wickremasinghe, On the same day former General Secretary Tissa Attanayake defected to the Sri Lanka Freedom Party.
