= Palitha Range Bandara =

Sri Lankan politician

Hon. Palitha Rangebandara
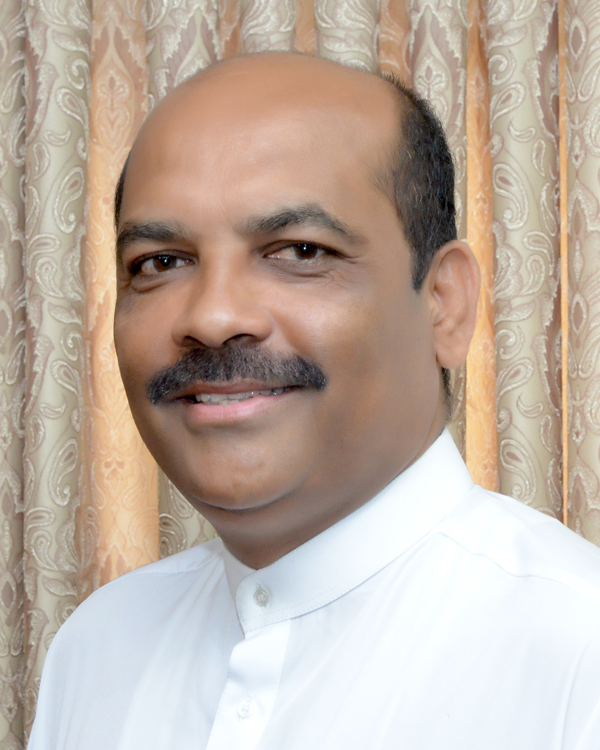

General Secretary of the United National Party
- In office 13 January 2021 – 29 August 2024
- Preceded by: Kabir Hashim
- Succeeded by: Thalatha Atukorale

Member of Parliament for Puttalam District
- In office 2000–2020

Ministry of Power and Energy
- In office 10 January 2015 – 09 August 2015

Ministry of Skills Development and Vocational Training (Sri Lanka)
- In office 9 August 2015 – 31 May 2017

Ministry of Irrigation
- In office 31 May 2017 – 2 May 2018

Personal details
- Born: 8 September 1962 (age 63) Puttalam
- Party: United National Party
- Other political affiliations: United National Front
- Spouse: Kanthi Senanayake
- Children: Yashoda Rangebandara Eranthi Rangebandara Tharushi Rangebandara
- Education: Ananda College, Puttlam
- Occupation: Politician, policeman
- Website: https://www.unp.lk/

Palitha Range Bandara (born September 8, 1962) is a Sri Lankan politician, retired police officer and current General Secretary of the United National Party.He is also the former State Minister of Irrigation and Water Resource Management and a former member of the Parliament of Sri Lanka from Anamaduwa.

== Professional career ==
Bandara claimed political victimization forced him to retire and the National Police Commission recommended that he be promoted to the grade of Assistant Superintendent of Police from his retirement grade of sub-inspector in December 2017.
