= CAHP Jayawardena =

Ceylonese forest conservator and military officer

Brigadier Christopher Allan Hector Perera Jayawardena
- Born: 29 March 1898
- Died: 6 January 1986 (aged 87)
- Military career
- Allegiance: Ceylon
- Branch: Ceylon Army
- Service years: 1925–1959
- Rank: Brigadier
- Unit: Ceylon Light Infantry

Brigadier Christopher Allan Hector Perera Jayawardena CMG CVO CStJ OBE ED (29 March 1898 – 6 January 1986) was a Ceylonese forest conservator and military officer. He was a Senior Assistant Conservator of Forests, Equerry to Queen Elizabeth II, Aide-de-camp to the Governor-General and Chief Commissioner of the Sri Lanka Scout Association.

== Education ==
Jayawardena was educated at Trinity College, Kandy, from 1904 to 1920. The college warden, Dr. B.J. Kidd, offered him a scholarship to study at Ripon College Cuddesdon, which he turned down to attend University of Oxford from 1920 to 1923. In 1923 he gained a Post Graduate Scholarship to Keble College, Oxford. He was an Oxford blue in Rugger, yet failed to gain a second blue for shooting in both .303 and .22 caliber, since he was not admitted to the Oxford UOTC because he was a man of colour.

== Forest conservator ==
On his return he joined the Forest Department as an Assistant Conservator of Forests in 1924. In 1929 he went back to England on a scholarship, taking with him 34 different species of Ceylon woods to the Forest Products Research Laboratory, for treatment with creosote and crude oil for wood preservation. He additionally obtained a Diploma in Forestry from the Imperial Forestry Institute and a diploma in anatomical structures of certain Ceylon woods. He gained the Carnegie Scholarship in 1933. Jayawardena also served as the first Ceylonese Deputy Warden of Wildlife, where he played a key role drafting the Wildlife Ordinance. He became the Senior Assistant Conservator of Forests before his retirement in 1949. He gained the Smith Mundt Scholarship in 1951 and was a Justice of the peace for the western province. Jayawardena was a Fellow of the Linnean Society of London.

== Private sector ==
Following his retirement he served as the General Manager, Aberdeen Cigarette Company, and Director, Godfrey and Partners.

== Military service ==
Jayawardena was commissioned as a second lieutenant in the Ceylon Light Infantry, as a volunteer officer in the Ceylon Defense Force in 1925. With the onset of World War II, the Ceylon Light Infantry was expanded for wartime service, and Major Jayawardena was appointed commanding officer of the 1st Battalion with Captain Anton Muttukumaru serving as his adjutant. He was soon promoted to rank of lieutenant colonel. With the formation of the Ceylon Army in 1949, he transferred to the Ceylon Volunteer Force Reserve with the rank of colonel and was appointed extra aide-de-camp to the governor-general in 1950, holding the appointment till 1959. In 1954, he served as equerry to Her Majesty Queen Elizabeth II during her Royal visit to Ceylon. He served as the commanding officer of the Home Guard Regiment when it was formed in 1955. On his retirement from the army in 1959, he was promoted to the honorary rank of Brigadier, the first volunteer officer to be promoted to the rank. He remained an honorary extra aide-de-camp to the governor-general till the late 1960s.

He was the President, Ceylon Rifle Association; the President, Small Bore Rifle Association and the Vice President, British Commonwealth Rifle Club.

== Social service ==
He served as the District Commissioner of the Colombo District Scout Association and was later the Chief Commissioner of the Sri Lanka Scout Association from 1948 to 1953, and was awarded the Silver Wolf Award in 1950. He was the Commissioner of the St. John Ambulance. Senior freemason in Irish, English and the Scottish masonic lodges in Ceylon, having served as the Grand Master of the Irish Masonic Temple in Ceylon and on the world governing body, and Grand Inspector for Irish Freemasonry in Sri Lanka. The first Governor of the Lions Club of Ceylon, he helped introduce the Lions Club to Ceylon and the white cane for the blind to Sri Lanka.

== Honors ==
He was appointed a Member of the Order of the British Empire (Military division) (MBE), an Officer of the Order of the British Empire (Military division) (OBE) in the 1944 New Year Honours, a Commander of the Order of St John (CStJ), a Commander of the Royal Victorian Order (CVO) in 1954 by the Queen during her visit to Ceylon and Companion of the Order of St Michael and St George (CMG) in the 1956 New Year Honours for public service.

His medals include the Efficiency Decoration, Defence Medal (1946), the War Medal 1939–1945 (1946) for wartime service in World War II with the Ceylon Defense Force; and for service in the Ceylon Army, he received the Ceylon Armed Services Long Service Medal, the Queen Elizabeth II Coronation Medal and the Ceylon Armed Services Inauguration Medal.

== Family ==
He married Sylvia Dorothy Samarasinghe. His sister Esther Jayawardena married Oliver Ernest Goonetilleke, who later became the third Governor-General of Ceylon. She died before her husband joined public service. Jayawardena had two children, Sita Helen Evelyn Parakrama (1925 – 1978) and Christopher Jayawardena. Both children predeceased him.
