= Sri Lanka Army Volunteer Force =

- ශ්‍රී ලංකා යුද්ධ හමුදා ස්වේච්ඡා බළසේනාව இலங்கை இராணுவ தொண்டர் படையணி
- SLAVF Emblem
- Active: 1881 – Present
- Allegiance: Sri Lanka
- Branch: Sri Lanka Army
- Type: Reserve force
- Size: 55,000 +
- Volunteer Force HQ: Salawa, Kosgama
- Colors
- Website: alt.army.lk/slavf

Commanders
- Commandant of the Volunteer Force: Major General K A W N H Bandaranayake USP
- Deputy Commandant: Maj Gen L W S R Wettasinghe
- Principal Staff Officer: Brig H W S K Galhenage RWP RSP USP psc

Insignia
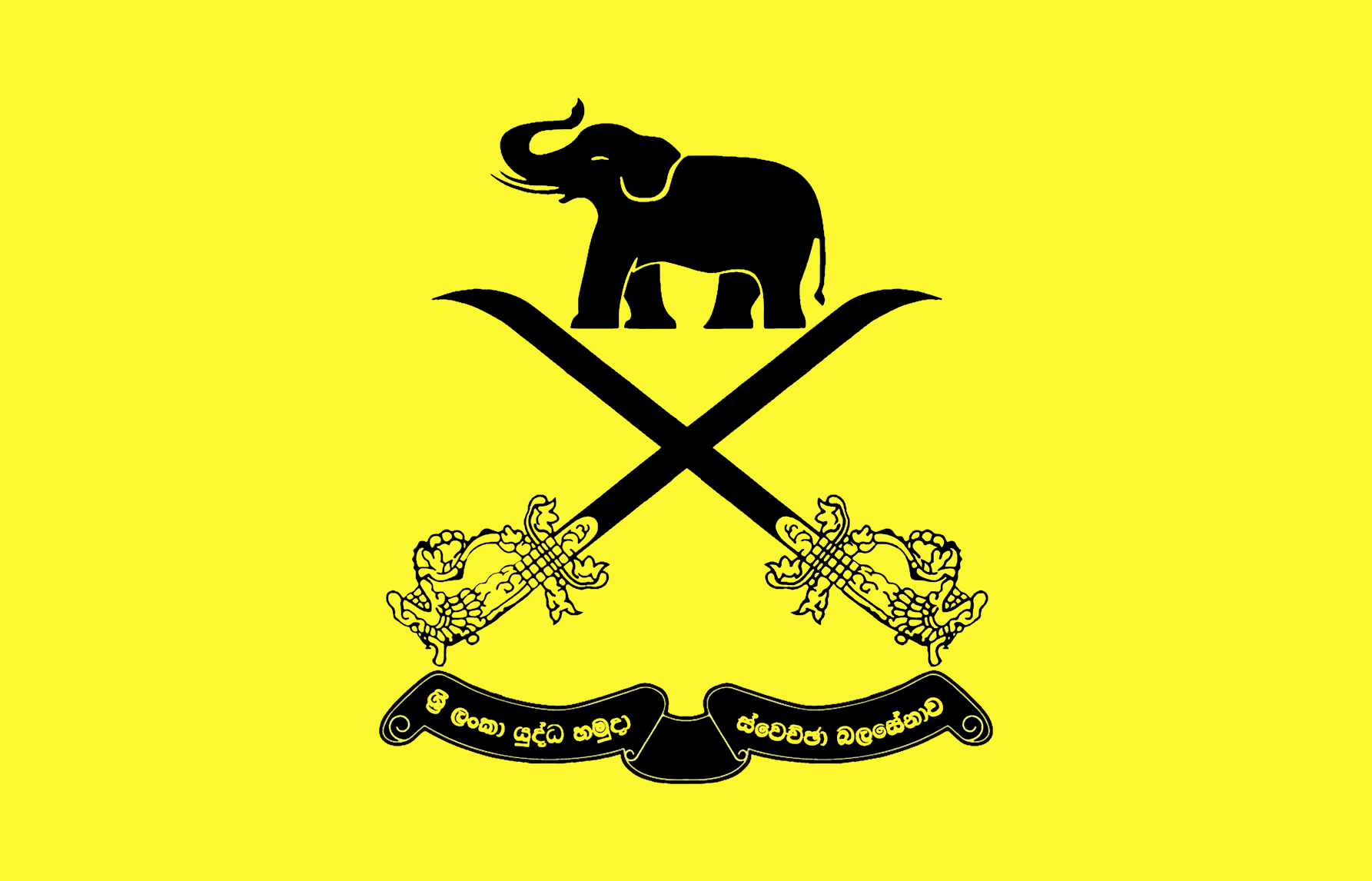
- Flag

The Sri Lanka Army Volunteer Force (SLAVF) is the active-duty volunteer reserve force of the Sri Lanka Army. The SLAVF is separate from the Regular Force (known as the regular army) which consists of personal who are professional soldiers and its Regular Reserve, which comprises personal who have a mobilization obligation following their service in the regular army. The SLAVF consists of the volunteer force and the volunteer reserve; administration and recruitment of reserve personal is carried out by the Volunteer Force Headquarters in Shalawa, Kosgama which is headed by the Commandant of the Volunteer Force. It has a current strength of about 55,000 personnel. The SLAVF was known as the Ceylon Volunteer Force from 1949 to 1972 and the Sri Lanka Volunteer Force from 1972 to 1985.

All regiments and corps of the army have volunteer battalions/regiments attached with the exception of the Commando Regiment, Special Forces Regiment, and the Sri Lanka Corps of Military Police which only consists of regular units, while the Sri Lanka Rifle Corps, the Sri Lanka Army Pioneer Corps, and the Sri Lanka National Guard consists only of volunteer units.

The SLAVF traces its origins to the Ceylon Light Infantry Volunteers which was formed in 1881 as a Volunteer Force and evolved into the Ceylon Defense Force. With the formation of the Ceylon Army under the Army Act of 1949, the Ceylon Volunteer Force was established to function as the reserve force of the newly formed Ceylon Army. It consisted of non-career officers and soldiers, who were only mobilized during national emergencies. These personal were attached to local units that trained on weekends and under took a two week long annual training camp held traditionally in Diyatalawa. With Sri Lanka becoming a republic in 1972, it was renamed as the Sri Lanka Volunteer Force. In 1985, following the Manpower Mobilization and Auxiliary Forces Act, No. 40 of 1985, it was renamed as the Sri Lanka Army Volunteer Force. Since the start of the Sri Lankan Civil War in 1983, the force has been in a continues state of mobilization and has functioned as a supplement force to booster the regular army, by means of short service tenures and reduced recruitment restrictions based on age and qualifications. The SLAVF officers and soldiers are paid at a similar rate, while engaged on military activities, as their regular counterparts. Since 2014, recruitment of civil professionals to the volunteer reserve had re-started with the army reverting to a peace time role.

== History ==
The SLAVF was founded in 1861 when the Ceylon Light Infantry Volunteers were created.

=== Ceylon Light Infantry Volunteers ===
The second phase in the employment of non-British military personnel commenced in 1861 after an ordinance authorized the creation of Volunteer Corps. This move addressed the disbanding of the Ceylon Rifle Regiment in 1874. The Ceylon Light Infantry Volunteers was originally administered as a single unit. However over the years various sections of the volunteers grew large enough to become independent. The different units that emerged from the Volunteer Force were:

- Ceylon Artillery Volunteers
- Ceylon Mounted Infantry (CMI)
- Ceylon Planters Rifle Corps (CPRC)
- Ceylon Volunteer Medical Corps
- Cadet Battalion Ceylon Light Infantry
- Ceylon Engineers
- Ceylon Supply & Transport Corps

=== Ceylon Defence Force ===
In 1910 the name of the military was changed to the Ceylon Defence Force (CDF). It continued to grow throughout the early 20th century. The CDF saw active service when a contingent of the Ceylon Mounted Infantry (CMI) in 1900, and a contingent of Ceylon Planters Rifle Corps (CPRC) in 1902, took part in the Second Boer War in South Africa. Their services were recognized by presentation, in 1902, of colors to the CMI, and a presentation in 1904, of a Banner to the CPRC. In 1922, the CDF was honored by the presentation of the King's and Regimental colors to the Ceylon Light Infantry (CLI).

During the First World War, many volunteers from the Defence Force traveled to England and joined the British Army, and many were killed in action. One of them mentioned by Arthur Conan Doyle was Private Jacotine of the CLI, who was the last man left alive in his unit at the Battle of Lys, and who fought for 20 minutes before he was killed.

In 1939, the CDF was mobilized and an enormous expansion took place that required raising new units such as the Post and Telegraph Signals, the Ceylon Railway Engineer Corps, the Ceylon Electrical and Mechanical Engineer Corps, the Auxiliary Territorial Service, the Ceylon Corps of Military Police, the Ceylon Signals Corps and the Colombo Town Guard Unit, which had been previously disbanded, but was re-formed to meet military requirements. During the Second World War Britain assumed direct control over the Armed Forces of Ceylon.

=== Ceylon Volunteer Force ===
Following the formation of the Army in 1949, the CDF became the nucleus of the Ceylon Army and all-volunteer units of the CDF—which was the majority—became the Ceylon Volunteer Force (CVF). Many Second World War veterans were serving in the CVF at the time and in the post-Independence years, the CVF played an important role while a new regular army was forming. During this time the CVF was mobilized repeatedly to counter riots and strikes.

=== 1962 attempted military coup ===
In 1962, senior officers CVF were implicated in a failed attempted coup. The government arrested and prosecuted the Commandant, Deputy Commandant, four volunteer battalion commanding officers, and junior officers including the staff officer, CVF HQ. Following the attempted coup, the two regular and three volunteer battalions suspected to be involved were disbanded along with the CVF headquarters. The functions of the CVF headquarters were transferred to the Army headquarters. Till 1962, volunteer regiments and battalion recruited officers and other ranks directly through sponsorships or applications. Which allowed for battalions to recruit from a particular geographical area such as the Kandy-based 2nd(v) Battalion, Sinha Regiment. This process was discontinued the Army headquarters undertaking recruitment and training centrally and allocations based on vacancies in each unit. Weekend training and annual training camps were reduced. Volunteer personal were further subjected to scrutinization in the internal security reviews in 1970.

=== Counter-insurgency operations ===
In 1971, there was a general mobilization with the start of the 1971 Insurrection undertaking counter-insurgency operations. With the start of the Sri Lankan Civil War, the volunteer force expanded along with the regular force and since 1993 remained mobilized throughout the war and after. The volunteer force proved to be a means of recruiting officers and other ranks that could not be otherwise be recruited into the regular force, due to age and qualification restrictions. Volunteer units played a vital role in Sri Lankan civil war in battles such as the Weli Oya, Kokavil, Mandaitivu and in the 1987–1989 JVP insurrection sustaining many casualties.

=== Cadet Corps ===
Since the formation of the first cadet platoon with students of the Royal College, Colombo which was attached to the Ceylon Light Infantry, the Cadet Battalion came under the Ceylon Defence Force. From 1949 the Ceylon Cadet Corps with its cadet battalions came under the Volunteer Force until 1988 when the National Cadet Corps was formed as a separate entity under the provisions of the Mobilization and Supplementary Forces Act, No. 40 of 1985.

== Units ==
The SLAVF consists of about 50,000 volunteer combat officers and other ranks attached to various units and regiments of the Sri Lanka Army.

Sri Lanka Armoured Corps

- 7th (v) Sri Lanka Armoured Corps

Sri Lanka Artillery

- 5th (v) Sri Lanka Artillery Regiment
- 12th (v) Sri Lanka Artillery Regiment

Sri Lanka Engineers

- 4th (v) Sri Lanka Engineers Regiment
- 15th (v) Sri Lanka Engineers Regiment

Sri Lanka Signals Corps

- 2nd (v) Sri Lanka Signals Corps Regiment

Sri Lanka Light Infantry

- 2nd (v) Sri Lanka Light Infantry
- 5th (v) Sri Lanka Light Infantry
- 9th (v) Sri Lanka Light Infantry
- 14th (v) Sri Lanka Light Infantry
- 16th (v) Sri Lanka Light Infantry
- 17th (v) Sri Lanka Light Infantry

Sri Lanka Sinha Regiment

- 2nd (v) Battalion, Sri Lanka Sinha Regiment
- 3rd (v) Battalion, Sri Lanka Sinha Regiment
- 5th (v) Battalion, Sri Lanka Sinha Regiment
- 11th (v) Battalion, Sri Lanka Sinha Regiment
- 15th (v) Battalion, Sri Lanka Sinha Regiment
- 17th (v) Battalion, Sri Lanka Sinha Regiment

Gemunu Watch

- 2nd (v) Gemunu Watch
- 3rd (v) Gemunu Watch
- 10th (v) Gemunu Watch
- 14th (v) Gemunu Watch
- 15th (v) Gemunu Watch
- 16th (v) Gemunu Watch

Gajaba Regiment

- 2nd (v) Gajaba Regiment
- 5th (v) Gajaba Regiment
- 7th (v) Gajaba Regiment
- 11th (v) Gajaba Regiment
- 15th (v) Gajaba Regiment
- 17th (v) Gajaba Regiment

Vijayabahu Infantry Regiment

- 2nd (v) Vijayabahu Infantry Regiment
- 3rd (v) Vijayabahu Infantry Regiment
- 10th (v) Vijayabahu Infantry Regiment
- 12th (v) Vijayabahu Infantry Regiment
- 17th (v) Vijayabahu Infantry Regiment
- 20th (v) Vijayabahu Infantry Regiment

Mechanized Infantry Regiment

- 5th (v) Mechanized Infantry Regiment

Military Intelligence Corps

- 3rd (v) Military Intelligence Corps
- 6th (v) Military Intelligence Corps

Engineer Services Regiment

- 4th (v) Engineer Service Regiment
- 6th (v) Engineer Service Regiment
- 7th (v) Engineer Service Regiment
- 8th (v) Engineer Service Regiment
- 9th (v) Engineer Service Regiment
- 10th (v) Engineer Service Regiment
- 12th (v) Engineer Service Regiment
- 14th (v) Engineer Service Regiment
- 15th (v) Engineer Service Regiment

Sri Lanka Army Service Corps

- 2nd (v) Sri Lanka Army Service Corps
- 9th (v) Sri Lanka Army Service Corps

Sri Lanka Army Medical Corps

- 2nd (v) Sri Lanka Army Medical Corps

Sri Lanka Army Ordnance Corps

- 4th (v) Ordnance Battalion

Sri Lanka Electrical and Mechanical Engineers

- 2nd (v) Sri Lanka Electrical and Mechanical Engineers

Sri Lanka Army General Service Corps

- 2nd (v) Sri Lanka Army General Service Corps
- 5th (v) Sri Lanka Army General Service Corps
- 6th (v) Sri Lanka Army General Service Corps

Sri Lanka Army Women's Corps

- 2nd (v) Sri Lanka Army Women's Corps
- 3rd (v) Sri Lanka Army Women's Corps
- 4th (v) Sri Lanka Army Women's Corps
- 5th (v) Sri Lanka Army Women's Corps

Sri Lanka Army Pioneer Corps

- 1st Bn Sri Lanka Army Pioneer Corps
- 2nd Bn Sri Lanka Army Pioneer Corps

Sri Lanka Rifle Corps

- 1st Bn Sri Lanka Rifle Corps
- 2nd Bn Sri Lanka Rifle Corps

Sri Lanka National Guard

- 1st Sri Lanka National Guard
- 2nd Sri Lanka National Guard
- 3rd Sri Lanka National Guard
- 4th Sri Lanka National Guard
- 5th Sri Lanka National Guard
- 6th Sri Lanka National Guard
- 7th Sri Lanka National Guard
- 8th Sri Lanka National Guard
- 9th Sri Lanka National Guard
- 10th Sri Lanka National Guard
- 11th Sri Lanka National Guard
- 12th Sri Lanka National Guard
- 13th Sri Lanka National Guard
- 14th Sri Lanka National Guard
- 15th Sri Lanka National Guard
- 16th Sri Lanka National Guard
- 17th Sri Lanka National Guard
- 18th Sri Lanka National Guard
- 19th Sri Lanka National Guard
- Sri Lanka National Guard (RFT)

Volunteer Force Training School

=== Former units ===
- Ceylon Railway Engineer Corps
- Post and Telegraph Signals
- Ruhunu Regiment
- Rajarata Rifles
- National Service Regiment
- Ceylon National Guard
- Home Guard Regiment
- 2nd (V) Antiaircraft Regiment, Ceylon Artillery
- 2nd (V) Field/Plant Regiment, Ceylon Engineers

== Training ==
SLAVF focuses on basic training for commissioned officers and other ranks, which is shorter in duration to the counterparts in the regular force and followed up with annual refresher training camps. Potential officers are mostly recruited between the ages of 18 and 26 years (regular force its 18 and 22 years) as officers cadets, who follow the Volunteer Commissioning Course (Volunteer Officer Cadet Intake) at the Sri Lanka Military Academy. The Volunteer Force Training School (VFTS) conducts shorted commissioning courses for direct entry and commissioning from other ranks selected as probationary officer. With the exception of commissioning from other ranks, all potential volunteer officers need to be processionals, employed as executive grades in public/private sector or have a private income of Rs.500,000 per year. Recruit training for other ranks takes place at regimental training battalions and units. VFTS conducts advance training programs such as staff and command courses for junior and senior volunteer officers.

== Awards and decorations ==
- Karyakshama Seva Vibhushanaya - Since 1972 for Commissioned Officers.
- Karyakshama Seva Padakkama - Since 1972 for other ranks.
- Sri Lanka Army Volunteer Force Centenary Medal - Awarded on the 100th Anniversary of the Volunteer Force
- Efficiency Decoration (Ceylon) - 1930 to 1972 for Commissioned Officers.
- Efficiency Medal (Ceylon) - 1930 to 1972 for other ranks.

== General of the Volunteer Force of the Army ==
Three former members of the volunteer force have been awarded the honorary rank of a General of the Volunteer Force of the Army.

- General Sir John Kotelawala — Former Prime Minister of Ceylon and Minister of Defense and External Affairs.
- General Ranjan Wijeratne — Former Minister of Foreign Affairs and Minister of State for Defence.
- General Anuruddha Ratwatte — Former Minister of Power and Energy and Deputy Minister for Defence

== Notable members ==
- Captain Saliya Upul Aladeniya - recipient of the Parama Weera Vibhushanaya
- Karu Jayasuriya - Former Speaker of Parliament and Minister
- Nissanka Wijeyeratne — Former Minister
- C. P. J. Seneviratne — Former Minister
- Ravi Jayewardene - Former National Security Adviser
- Brigadier Christopher Allan Hector Perera Jayawardena - Senior Assistant Conservator of Forests and Aide-de-camp to the Governor-General
- Colonel F. C. de Saram - Deputy Commandant of the Volunteer Force, an accused members of the attempted military coup
- Major Victor Gunasekara - Former Controller of Imports Exports, Government Agent of Kegalle and Secretary to the Board of Control for Cricket.
- Major Duncan White - First Ceylonese Olympic Silver Medalist
- Susanthika Jayasinghe - Sri Lankan Olympic Silver Medalist
- Major Dinesh Chandimal - former captain of the Sri Lanka national cricket team
- Major Thisara Perera - former captain of the Sri Lanka national cricket team
- Captain Bob Harvie - radio personality
- Lieutenant Colonel J.H.V. de Alwis — Commanding Officer, 2nd Volunteer Engineers, Ceylon Engineers, an accused members of the attempted military coup
- Lieutenant Colonel B.R. Jesudasan — Commanding Officer, 2nd Volunteer Signals, Ceylon Signals Corps, an accused members of the attempted military coup.
- Lieutenant Colonel Noel Mathyesz - Commanding Officer, Ceylon Electrical and Mechanical Engineers, an accused members of the attempted military coup in 1962.
- Captain J.A.R. Felix — Staff Officer, Ceylon Volunteer Force Headquarters, an accused members of the attempted military coup in 1962.

== See also ==
- Sri Lanka Army
- Sri Lanka Volunteer Naval Force
- Sri Lanka Volunteer Air Force
- Colombo Town Guard
