= Sri Lanka Army Pioneer Corps =

- Active: 5 July 1959 – Present
- Country: Sri Lanka
- Branch: Sri Lanka Army
- Type: Pioneer
- Size: 1595
- Part of: Sri Lanka Army Volunteer Force
- Garrison/HQ: Matugama
- Mottos: ශ්‍රමය ජාතියක ජීවයයි Shramaya Jathiyaka Jivayai (Sinhala: Work is the Lifeblood of a Nation)
- Colors
- Engagements: 1971 Insurrection; Insurrection 1987-89; Sri Lankan Civil War
- Website: https://alt.army.lk/pioneercorps/

Commanders
- Commanding Officer: Col Lasantha Jayasooriya
- Deputy Commanding Officer: Lt Col Nalaka Hettigoda
- Adjutant: Capt Dhananjaya Aththanayaka
- Regimental Sergeant Major: WO1 K G Gunasekara

Insignia
- Flag

The Sri Lanka Army Pioneer Corps (SLAPC) is a pioneer reserve regiment of the Sri Lanka Army that specialized in CBRN defense management, defusing and disposal of bombs and land mines, demolition and underwater demolition, engineer reconnaissance, military engineering, jungle and trench warfare, raiding with small unit tactics to destroy enemy defensive structures, and route clearance. Established as manpower reserve to be utilized in times of strikes and union action to maintain the functionality of essential services and other state functions, other such units that existed then and has since been disband include the Post and Telegraph Signals (PTS) and the Ceylon Railway Engineer Corps (CREC). With the escalation of the Sri Lankan civil war the regiment has taken up combat duties.

== History ==
The Ceylon Army Pioneer Corps was raised on 5 July 1959 with a large strength of 14,000 men. The unit is part of the Volunteer Force and was based on the Ceylon Pioneers. Lt Col M.W.F. Abayakoon of the Cadet Corps was appointed its commanding officer. The main reason to raise this unit with a large strength was the frequent breakdown of essential services at that time due to workers unrest and strikes. Members of the corps used to handle harbour duties and driving of public transport. The Pioneer Corps brought back normalcy in the harbour and other establishments, and the country was saved from starvation as foreign ships were threatening to bypass the Colombo harbor due to delays in unloading as a result of constant trade union action. When the workers’ unrest in the city was settled, in 1962 the Pioneers were employed in the Kantale Sugar Corporation to perform duties when the workers their went on strike.

In 1964 the pioneers assisted the field engineers of the Sri Lanka Engineers in constructing the Dambulla – Galewela Road and Katunayake Airport Road.

Since the 1971 Insurrection, the Pioneers have also been employed in internal security duties all over the island. Pioneer Corps was employed in building the New Defence Headquarters Complex.

== Units ==
=== Volunteers ===
- 1st Bn Sri Lanka Army Pioneer Corps (Formed on 5 July 1959)
- 2nd Bn Sri Lanka Army Pioneer Corps (Formed on 28 March 2016)

== Order of precedence ==
Preceded by Sri Lanka Rifle Corps	Order of Precedence	Succeeded by Sri Lanka National Guard

== See also ==
- Sri Lanka Army

== External links and sources ==
- Sri Lanka Army
- Sri Lanka Army Pioneer Corps
