= Ministry of Foreign Employment Promotion and Welfare =

Government ministry of Sri Lanka

State Ministry of Foreign Employment Promotions and Market Diversification

Government Ministry overview
- Formed: 1 January 2005; 21 years ago
- Type: Ministry
- Jurisdiction: Sri Lanka
- Headquarters: No. 34, Narahenpita Road, Nawala.
- Employees: 987
- Annual budget: Rs .561,650 Billion
- Minister responsible: Piyankara Jayaratne
- Government Ministry executives: Suntharam Arumainayaham, Secretary; Pradeep Saputhanthri, Additional Secretary
- Parent Government Ministry: Sri Lanka Government
- Child agencies: Sri Lanka Bureau of Foreign Employment; Sri Lanka Foreign Employment Agency
- Website: mfe.gov.lk

The State Ministry of Foreign Employment Promotions and Market Diversification is a ministry in the Government of Sri Lanka responsible “for converting the entire labour migration sector into a demand driven process and make it highly competitive by introducing required structural changes together with necessary promotional and welfare activities to meet the international market challenges considering the importance of its contribution to the national economy.”

== List of ministers ==
State Minister of Foreign Employment Promotions and Market Diversification of Sri Lanka
- Incumbent; Piyankara Jayaratne
- Appointer: The president on advice of the prime minister
- Formation: 1 January 2005
- Website: State Ministry of Foreign Employment Promotions and Market Diversification

The state minister of foreign employment promotions and market diversification is an appointment in the Cabinet of Sri Lanka.

Parties

Sri Lanka Freedom Party

United National Party

Sri Lanka Podu Jana Peramuna

Name	Portrait	Party	Tenure	President
Dilan Perera		Sri Lanka Freedom Party	22 November 2010 – 9 January 2015	Mahinda Rajapaksa
Thalatha Atukorale		United National Party	12 January 2015 – 25 February 2018	Maithripala Sirisena
Harin Fernando		United National Party	25 February 2018 – 1 November 2019	Maithripala Sirisena
Dinesh Gunawardene		Sri Lanka Podu Jana Peramuna	1 November 2019 - 20 August 2020	Gotabaya Rajapaksha
Piyankara Jayaratne		Sri Lanaka Podujana Peramuna	20 August 2020 – Present	Gotabaya Rajapaksha

== See also ==
- List of ministries of Sri Lanka
