= Lakshman Senewiratne =

Sri Lankan politician

Hon. Lakshman Senewiratne MP
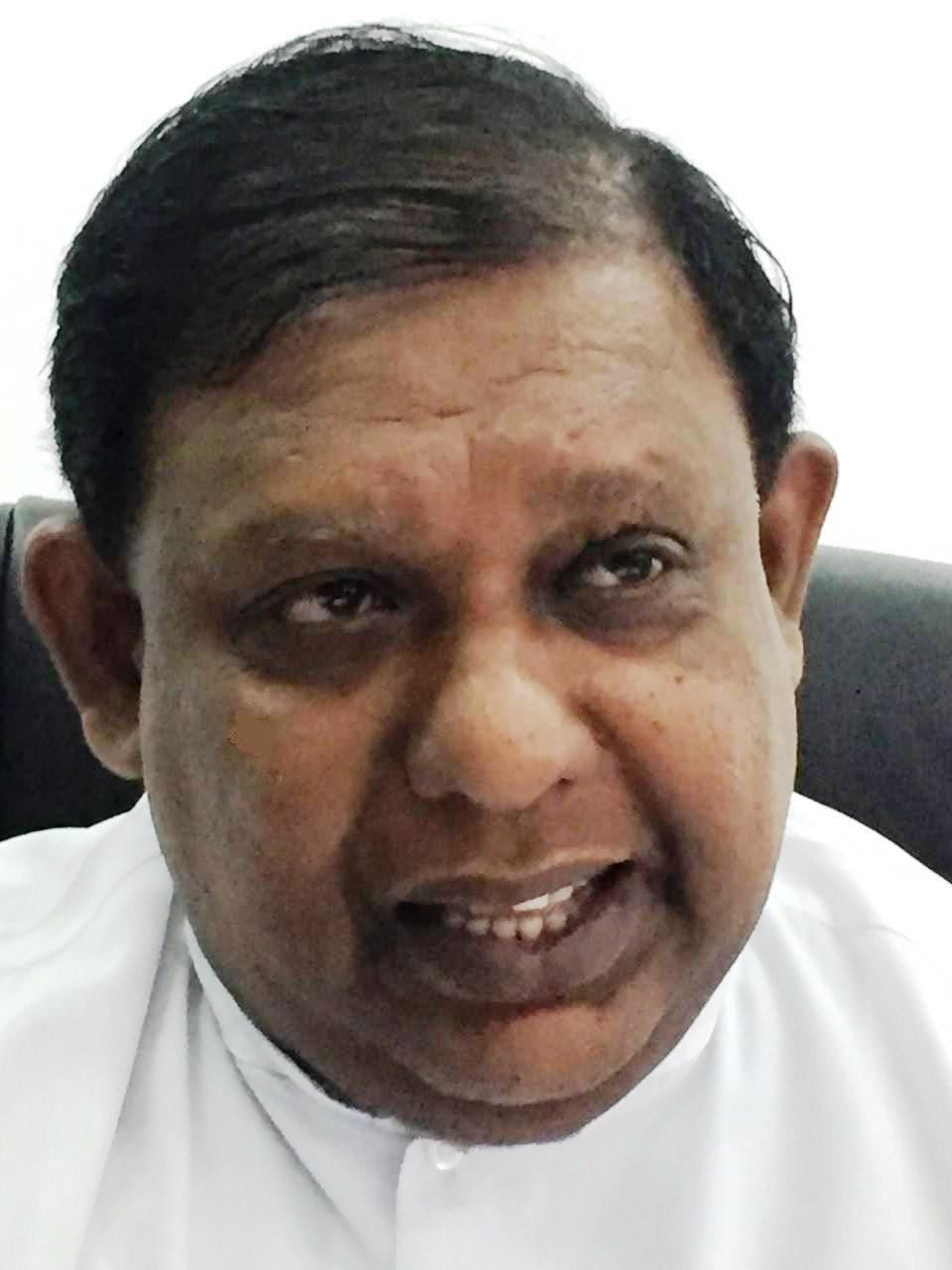

State Minister of Science Technology and Research
- In office 6 April 2016 – 2018
- President: Maithripala Sirisena
- Prime Minister: Ranil Wickremesinghe

Minister of Sugar Industries
- In office 28 January 2013 – 12 January 2015

Member of Parliament for Badulla District
- Incumbent
- Assumed office 22 September 2015
- Preceded by: Chamara Sampath Dassanayake

Personal details
- Born: 9 March 1957 (age 69)
- Party: Sri Lanka Freedom Party
- Other political affiliations: United National Party
- Spouse: Kanthi Senewiratne
- Profession: Politician

Lakshman Pinto Jayatilaka Senewiratne (born 9 March 1957) (known as Lakshman Senewiratne) is a Sri Lankan politician, former State Minister of Science, Technology and Research and a member of the Parliament of Sri Lanka representing the Badulla District. and former Cabinet Minister of Sugar Industries, His father C. P. J. Senewiratne was an MP for Mahiyangana electorate and former Cabinet Minister of Labour in the government of J.R. Jayewardene.

Lakshman was elected to parliament in the seat of Mahiyangana at a by-election on 18 April 1985, following the death of the sitting member, Lakshman's father, in December 1984. At the 1989 Sri Lankan parliamentary elections he was elected as the member for Badulla and has continuously represented the seat for 32 years.

== See also ==
- List of political families in Sri Lanka
