= Mahiyangana Electoral District =

Electoral district of Sri Lanka

Mahiyangana electoral district was an electoral district of Sri Lanka between March 1960 and February 1989. The district was named after the town of Mahiyangana in Badulla District, Uva Province. The 1978 Constitution of Sri Lanka introduced the proportional representation electoral system for electing members of Parliament. The existing 160 mainly single-member electoral districts were replaced with 22 multi-member electoral districts. Mahiyangana electoral district was replaced by the Badulla multi-member electoral district at the 1989 general elections.

== Members of Parliament ==
Key

Independent SLFP UNP

Election	Member	Party	Term
1960 (March)	C. P. J. Seneviratne	United National Party	1960
1960 (July)	C. P. J. Seneviratne	United National Party	1960–65
1965	C. P. J. Seneviratne	United National Party	1965–70
1970	D. D. E. Wickremaratne	Sri Lanka Freedom Party	1970–77
1977	C. P. J. Seneviratne	United National Party	1977–84
1985 By-election	Lakshman Senewiratne	United National Party	1985–89

== Elections ==
=== 1960 (March) Parliamentary General Election ===
Results of the 4th parliamentary election held on 19 March 1960:

Candidate	Party	Symbol	Votes	%
C. P. J. Seneviratne	United National Party	Elephant	3,164	35.94
K. D. Goonaratna	Sri Lanka Freedom Party	Hand	2,805	31.86
K. B. Herath	Mahajana Eksath Peramuna	Cartwheel	1,781	20.23
Marshall Perera	Lanka Sama Samaja Party	Key	606	6.88
B. P. Weerakoon	SLDP	Omnibus	171	1.94
Valid Votes			8,527	96.85
Rejected Votes			277	3.15
Total Polled			8,804	100.00
Registered Electors			15,909	
Turnout				55.34

=== 1960 (July) Parliamentary General Election ===
Results of the 5th parliamentary election held on 20 July 1960:

Candidate	Party	Symbol	Votes	%
C. P. J. Seneviratne	United National Party	Elephant	4,811	49.58
K. D. Goonaratna	Sri Lanka Freedom Party	Hand	4,135	42.61
K. B. Herath	Mahajana Eksath Peramuna	Cartwheel	599	6.17
Valid Votes			9,545	98.36
Rejected Votes			159	1.64
Total Polled			9,704	100.00
Registered Electors			15,909	
Turnout				61.0

=== 1965 Parliamentary General Election ===
Results of the 6th parliamentary election held on 22 March 1965:

Candidate	Party	Symbol	Votes	%
C. P. J. Seneviratne	United National Party	Elephant	7,296	51.12
R. M. G. Ratnayake	Sri Lanka Freedom Party	Hand	6,253	43.81
K. D. Gunaratne		Aeroplane	460	3.22
Valid Votes			14,009	98.15
Rejected Votes			264	1.85
Total Polled			14,273	100.00
Registered Electors			19,769	
Turnout				72.20

=== 1970 Parliamentary General Election ===
Results of the 7th parliamentary election held on 27 May 1970:

Candidate	Party	Symbol	Votes	%
D. D. E. Wickremaratne	Sri Lanka Freedom Party	Hand	11,886	54.98
C. P. J. Seneviratne	United National Party	Elephant	9,330	43.16
R. M. G. Ratnayake		Chair	219	1.01
Valid Votes			21,435	99.15
Rejected Votes			183	0.85
Total Polled			21,618	100.00
Registered Electors			26,811	
Turnout				80.63

=== 1977 Parliamentary General Election ===
Results of the 8th parliamentary election held on 21 July 1977:

Candidate	Party	Symbol	Votes	%
C. P. J. Seneviratne	United National Party	Elephant	14,105	70.45
Navaratna Banda Galketiya	Sri Lanka Freedom Party	Hand	5,304	26.49
Kiribanda Herath		Cartwheel	257	1.28
K. H. M. Apopuhamy Piyarapana		Lamp	188	0.94
Kingsley Kodippili		Key	74	0.37
Valid Votes			19,928	99.54
Rejected Votes			93	0.46
Total Polled			20,021	100.00
Registered Electors			23,026	
Turnout				86.95
