= Sri Lanka Army Ordnance Corps =

- Active: 14 October 1949 - Present
- Country: Sri Lanka
- Branch: Sri Lanka Army
- Role: Combat Support
- Size: 6 Battalions & 3 Base Depots
- Regimental Centre: Dombagoda
- Motto: To the Warrior His Arms
- Colors
- Anniversaries: 14 October (Regimental day)
- Engagements: 1971 Insurrection; Insurrection 1987-89; Sri Lankan Civil War
- Website: https://alt.army.lk/slaoc/

Commanders
- Colonel Commandant of The Regiment: Major General W M S N Wijekoon ndc AATO
- Director Ordnance Services: Brigadier Brig W M A N Warnasooriya ato
- Centre Commandant of The Regiment: Brigadier G T S Silva USP QLCO Lsc ato

The Sri Lanka Army Ordnance Corps (SLAOC) is a combat support corps of the Sri Lanka Army. The role of the corps is the procurement, receipt, storage, accounting, maintenance, control, issue and disposal of ordnance stores. It is made up of seven regular ordnance battalions, three Base Depots, one volunteer (reserve) ordnance battalion, and many independent ordnance depots. It is headquartered at the Regimental Centre, Dombagoda.

== History ==
=== 1949-1972 ===
The Regiment of the Sri Lanka Army Ordnance became a Corps on 14 October 1949. With the raising of Ceylon Army in 1949, munitions of the Royal Ordnance were accepted and stacked in government storerooms. The Ordnance storeroom was established on 1 February 1950 in Kirulapone.

Major B G Brecher was the first Director of the Sri Lanka Ordnance. He was dispatched to Sri Lanka on 11 March 1950. The initial plan was laid down by him with the advice of Wolly Rowi. Sri Lanka Corps of Ordnance was officially established as a Unit on 29 March 1950 with 2 Commissioned Officers, 2 Warrant Officers, 1 Staff Sergeant, and 3 Sergeants under the direction of Major B G Brecher. Its founder members were Captain ED Ebert, Lieutenant AADB Perera, WO I, BC Waisse, WO I, PM Rathnayake, Staff Sergeant Wickramaseka WEB, Sergeant Karunathilaka MLWB, Sergeant Ebert JAVD, Sergeant De Alwis CS.

Cylon Ordnance Corps was the youngest Commonwealth member to have been raised according to Royal Ordnance. Other ranks were first recruited to the Corps on 7 February 1950. During the initial years, the Corps operated as two units - the Directorate of Ordnance Services was at the Army Headquarters while the Ordnance Depot was located in Kirulapone.

Policy affairs, planning and inventorying were the responsibility of the Ordnance Directorate, while acceptance of goods, stocking, and issuance were the responsibilities of the issuing depot. The first-ever stock was what the Army purchased from the Royal Ordnance.

An Arms and Ammunition unit was established at Army Headquarters on 23 March 1950. Its first staff included one officer and three other ranks. As the responsibilities assigned to them were growing, the first ordnance depot was established as part Sri Lanka Electrical Mechanical Engineering Corp. This unit functioned according to the Royal Ordnance Depot which was part of the Royal Electrical and Mechanical Engineering Corps.

The Kirulapone Ordnance Depot was shifted to Panagoda Army Cantonment, Panagoda in July 1955 where it remained. In March 1956, the Sri Lanka Corps of Ordnance was separated from the Royal Army Ordnance Corps. The officers, therefore, returned to their country, and in the same month, Lt Col DFT Abeysinghe was appointed the unit's first Commanding Officer. At the time, the Corps consisted of 6 officers and 176 other ranks.

Thereafter, the SLAOC was functioning jointly with the Ordnance Director under the supervision of a senior Stock control officer and accounts officer. All duties pertaining to SLAOC were performed under the SLAOC Directorate and the Commanding Officer SLAOC was answerable to the Army Commander on all technical affairs related to ordnance services.

== Units ==
=== Regular Army ===
- School of ordnance at Dombagoda - Overlooking Commandant Lt Col W D P K Withana psc AATO
- Sri Lanka Army Ordnance Industries at Veyangoda - Commandant Col V D Warushavithana ato
- Base Ordnance Depot at Ragama - Commandant Col J I B W Pallekumbura ato
- Central Arms and Ammunition Depot at Veyangoda - Commandant Col N I R Silva ato
- Army Clothing Depot at Veyangoda - Commandant Lt Col A M R H B Abeysinghe USP Lsc AATO
- 1st Ordnance Battalion at Panagoda - Commanding Officer Maj J G S Eranda Lsc AATO
- 2nd Ordnance Battalion at Anuradapura - Commanding Officer Maj H H K Halloluwage Lsc AATO
- 3rd Ordnance Battalion at Mineriya - Commanding Officer Maj H L D G P Senarathne USP psc AATO
- 5th Ordnance Battalion at Kankasanturei - Commanding Officer Maj S P R Dissanayaka Lsc AATO
- 6th Ordnance Battalion at Kilinochchi - Commanding Officer Maj H K S S Dilantha USP psc ato
- Regional Ordnance Depot Complex at Mulathiv - Commandant Lt Col P S C Prasad USP QLCO Lsc AATO

=== Volunteers ===
- 4th Ordnance Battalion at Kandy (Formed on 1 December 1995) - Commanding Officer Maj U L P K Udawatta ato

== Notable members ==
- Brigadier G. R. Jayasinghe - founder of the Sri Lanka Rifle Corps
- Brigadier Jupana Jayawardena

== Order of precedence ==
Preceded by Sri Lanka Army Medical Corps	Order of Precedence	Succeeded by Sri Lanka Electrical and Mechanical Engineers

== External links and sources ==
- Sri Lanka Army
- Sri Lanka Army Ordnance Corps
- ordnan cecricket
