= Mallory Evan Wijesinghe =

Sri Lankan engineer and entrepreneur

- Born: June 25, 1918; Sri Lanka
- Died: December 27, 2002 (aged 84); Sri Lanka
- Occupation(s): Engineer and Entrepreneur

Mallory Evan Wijesinghe, KStJ (June 25, 1918 – December 27, 2002) was a Sri Lankan engineer and entrepreneur. He served as the chairman of the Ceylon Chamber of Commerce, the Bartleet Group and was the founding chairman of the state-owned Ceylon Hotels Corporation(1967–70).

Educated at the Royal College Colombo, Wijesinghe obtained his B.Sc.(Eng) degree in Civil Engineering from King's College London, and joined the Public Works Department in 1941 as a civil engineer. In 1956, he decided to leave his career in the public sector and join a privately held company involved in the tea trade.

In November 1958, Wijesinghe was appointed the first Ceylonese Director of Bartleet and Co. Ltd., a leading company in tea broking, and in the 1960s became the company's first Ceylonese Managing Director. In 1972, he led a trade delegation from Sri Lanka to Bangladesh and Pakistan during his tenure as the Chairman of the Ceylon Chamber of Commerce.

In 1973, Wijesinghe was appointed the Honorary Consul-General of the Netherlands to the Republic of Sri Lanka and of the Maldives and was later honoured by her Majesty Queen Beatrix by being made an Officer in the Order of Orange Nassau in 1985.

Wijesinghe was the founder chairman of the Colombo Stock Exchange, Chairman of the Employers' Federation of Ceylon (1960–71), Chairman of the Ceylon Chamber of Commerce (1964–70) and Chairman of the Colombo Brokers' Association (1960, 1965, 1970 and 1984). He was the founding President of the Federation of the Chambers of Commerce and Industry in Sri Lanka (1970–77), and the President of the Institute of Management of Sri Lanka, which he was involved in establishing. Wijesinghe was popularly called 'Mr Private Sector' as a result of his extensive involvement in a multitude of positions and assignments involving the 'mercantile' sector of Ceylon, and later Sri Lanka.

A devoted Anglican, he was President of the Colombo YMCA, chairman of the Salvation Army Advisory Board and chairman of the National St. John Council for Sri Lanka. In 1978, he was made Knight of The Most Venerable Order of the Hospital of St. John of Jerusalem by Queen Elizabeth II, the Sovereign Head of the Order. He also served as the Chairman of the Incorporated Trustees of the Church of England in Ceylon and a Trustee of the Royal College Union Trust even during his latter period of retirement.

Mallory was married to Joyce Wijesinghe and had three children. His son Eraj is currently the Chairman of the Bartleet Group, younger son Sunil, an electronics engineer by profession, is the former Deputy Chairman of the Bartleet Group (now retired) and his only daughter Dr. (Mrs) Hiranthi Wijemanne, a qualified specialist in public health served in various capacities in both governmental and non-governmental organisations (formerly Programme Officer/UNICEF).

== Books authored ==
- The Economy of Sri Lanka 1948–75
- Sri Lanka's Development Thrust 1977–80

== Honors ==
- Knight of The Most Venerable Order of the Hospital of St. John of Jerusalem
- Officer in the Order of Orange Nassau
