= Japana Jayawardena =

Sri Lankan army officer

Brigadier Jayadeva Prakrama Amarasekera Jayawardena also simply known as Japana Jayawardena or Jupana Jayawardena (born 25 October 1947) is a former Sri Lankan rugby union player, administrator and military officer. During his playing career, he predominantly played in the position of scrum half. He had served in as the director of the Sri Lanka Army Ordnance Corps.

== Biography ==
His original birthname was Jayadeva Prakrama Amarasekera Jayawardena but it was shortened to Japana Jayawardena, as one of his friends called him at Trinity College as Japana, referring to his first letters that feature in his fullname J-P-A and ending letters of his fullname NA. It was also revealed that due to his short stature, he was nicknamed as Japan Bonikka which was also coincidental in adjusting his name as Japana. He was born in Botale, Pahala Waluwa, Ambepussa.

== Career ==
He plied his trade in rugby during his schooling days at Trinity College, and he drew first blood in his first year of school rugby in 1966 at Trinity College, as he made rapid strides as a scrum half in his first year, which eventually propelled him to secure the prestigious Trinity Lion Award. After his schooling years, he ventured into club rugby. Japana represented Havelock Sports Club from 1967 to 1969, before switching his allegiance for Sri Lanka Army Sports Club in 1970. He turned up for Sri Lanka Army Sports Club until 1974 and captained the side in his final year with the club.

He served in an important capacity in the Sri Lankan Army Sports Board for a two year stint from 1995 to 1997. In January 2000, he returned to the role at Sri Lankan Army Sports Board. Jupana also underwent special training as a rugby coach in England, Wales and in New Zealand. In 2008, Minister of Sports and Public Recreation Gamini Lokuge appointed Jupana as the chairman of the national selection committee of the Sri Lanka Rugby Football Union.

He also endured a stint as the chairman of the Sri Lanka Rugby Football Union. He also received membership of the Sri Lanka Rugby Referees Association and he also went onto serve as the President of Sri Lanka Rugby Referees Association for a brief stint. He was at the forefront in laying a foundation to form the Central Provincial Referees Society, and he served as its founder president. Reportedly, he was also the fulcrum of the women's rugby in Sri Lanka, having spearheaded the effort to play a pivotal role in introducing the sport to women in Sri Lanka when the sport was only played among men due to it being a physical contact sport played with endurance and stamina.

In 2014, he was conferred with the life membership of the Sri Lanka Rugby Football Union as it was announced during its Annual General Meeting in recognition of his contributions towards the development and uplifting of the standards of rugby in Sri Lanka.

== See also ==
- List of Sri Lankan generals and brigadiers
