= Ceylon Pioneers =

Ceylon Pioneers was a paramilitary unit formed as a skilled labor force with military type discipline in British Ceylon. Raised in 1821, with recruits from India, personal from the unit were used by the Public Works Department in construction of railways, road and bridges in Ceylon and Malaya till 1947. Ceylonese serving with the force in Malaya were eligible for the General Service Medal with the Malaya Clasp

== Notable personal ==
- C. P. J. Seneviratne

== See also ==
- Sri Lanka Army Pioneer Corps
