= C. P. J. Seneviratne =

Sri Lankan military officer and politician

Hon. C. P. J. Seneviratne

Member of Parliament for Mahiyangana
- In office 30 March 1960 – April 1970
- Preceded by: Constituency created
- Succeeded by: D. D. E. Wickremaratne
- In office August 1977 – 26 December 1984
- Preceded by: D. D. E. Wickremaratne
- Succeeded by: Lakshman Senewiratne

Personal details
- Born: Cyril Pinto Jayatilake Seneviratne; 23 April 1918 Gampaha
- Died: 26 December 1984 (aged 66) Colombo
- Party: United National Party
- Children: Lakshman

Captain Cyril Pinto Jayatilake Seneviratne (23 April 1918 - 26 December 1984) was a Sri Lankan military officer and politician. He was the Member of Parliament for Mahiyangana from 1960-1970 and 1977-1984 and served as the Minister of Labour in the Jayewardene cabinet (1977-1984).

== Education ==
Seneviratne attended school at Gampaha and 1942 he obtained a certificate as an instructor from the Physical Training Institute in Ambala, India.

== Military service ==
Following his return he gained a commission as an officer of Ceylon Engineers Corps. In 1947 Seneviratne was appointed a Captain of the Ceylon Pioneers and served with the Corps when they were sent to Malaysia to oversee the construction of the railway line from Taiping to Port Weld (now known as Kuala Sepetang). While in Malayasia he played a leading part in the construction of Lankaramaya, the Buddhist Vihara in Singapore. Seneviratne claims that in 1949 he obtained a sapling of the Sri Maha Bodhi tree in Anuradhapura, which he planted at Lankaramaya. He left the army in 1950.

== Political career ==
Senerviratne contested the 4th parliamentary elections, held on 19 March 1960, in the newly created seat of Mahiyangana, representing the United National Party. He was successful, polling 3,164 votes (36% of the total vote) defeating the Sri Lanka Freedom Party candidate by 359 votes. At the subsequent parliamentary elections in July 1960 he retained the seat receiving 4,811 votes (50% of the total vote).

He won the seat again at the 6th parliamentary elections, held on 22 March 1965, increasing his vote to 51% of the total vote. At the subsequent parliamentary election, held on 27 May 1970, he was defeated by the Sri Lanka Freedom Party candidate, D. D. E. Wickremaratne, by 2,556 votes, only obtaining 43% of the total vote.

Senerviratne however was successful in regaining the seat of Mahiyangana at the 8th parliamentary election, held on 21 July 1977, where he defeated the Sri Lanka Freedom Party candidate, Navaratna Banda Galketiya, by 8,801 votes (obtaining 70% of the total vote).

== Death ==
Senerviratne died at the Colombo Hospital on 26 December 1984, whilst still serving as the Minister for Labour. Senerviratne's son, Lakshman, was subsequently elected to parliament representing his father's seat of Mahiyangana at a by-election on 18 April 1985. His son is a current Minister and Member of Parliament for Badulla.

== See also ==
- List of political families in Sri Lanka
