= Leader of the United National Party =

Leader of the United National Party of Sri Lanka
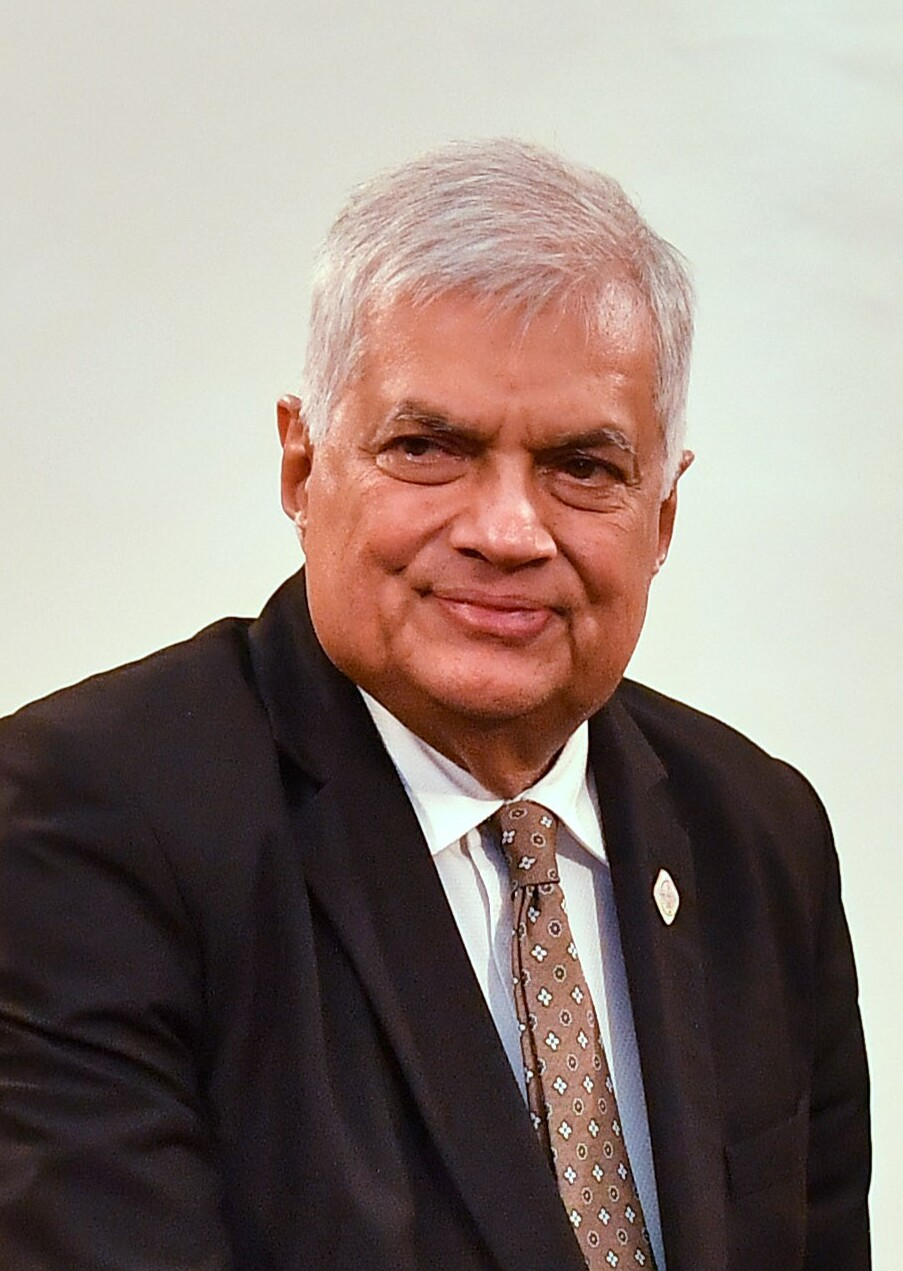
- Incumbent; Ranil Wickremesinghe since 12 November 1994; 31 years, 9 months and 26 days
- United National Party
- Type: Political party office
- Appointer: Working committee
- Term length: None
- Inaugural holder: D. S. Senanayake
- Formation: 1947
- Succession: Deputy Leader
- Deputy: Ruwan Wijewardene
- Website: www.apiunp.com

The United National Party (UNP) (Sinhala: එක්සත් ජාතික පක්ෂය, romanized: Eksath Jāthika Pakshaya, Tamil: ஐக்கிய தேசியக் கட்சி, romanized: Aikkiya Tēciyak Kaṭci) is one of the oldest political parties in Sri Lanka. It has been the main ruling party in Sri Lanka on several occasions. The leader of the United National Party is the highest position in the party. The leader is appointed by the majority vote of the working committee of the party who meets at Sirikotha, when the position is vacant.

The party had seven leaders since 1947. Former President Ranil Wickremesinghe has been the leader of the UNP since 1994. Ruwan Wijewardene is the current deputy leader of the UNP.

Name	Portrait	Province	Periods In Party Leadership	Highest Position Held
D. S. Senanayake		Western	1947–1952	Prime Minister
Dudley Senanayake		Western	1952–1953	Prime Minister
John Kotelawala		North Western	1953–1956	Prime Minister
Dudley Senanayake		Western	1956–1973	Prime Minister (Note: Two terms.)
J. R. Jayewardene		Western	1973–1989	President
Ranasinghe Premadasa		Western	1989–1993	President
Dingiri Banda Wijetunga		Central	1993–1994	President
Ranil Wickremesinghe		Western	1994–present	President
