= Sri Lanka National Guard =

- ශ්‍රී ලංකා ජාතික ආරක්ෂක බළමුළුව
- Active: 1 November 1989 – Present
- Country: Sri Lanka
- Branch: Sri Lanka Army
- Type: National Guard
- Role: Infantry
- Size: 35 volunteer battalions
- Part of: Sri Lanka Army Volunteer Force
- Regimental Centre: Kurunegala
- Mottos: ස්වාර්ථයට පෙර දේශය; Swarthayata Pera Deshaya (Sinhala: Country before Self)
- Colors
- Anniversaries: 1 November
- Engagements: Sri Lankan Civil War

Commanders
- Centre Commandant: Colonel HA Keerthinatha RSP KSP psc
- Colonel of the Regiment: Lieutenant General H L V M Liyanage RWP RSP ndu

Insignia
- Unit flag

The Sri Lanka National Guard (SLNG) is the largest regiment in the Sri Lanka Army. It is a volunteer regiment currently made up of 35 battalions coming under the Sri Lanka Army Volunteer Force.

== History ==
The number of battalions was gradually increased to 16 and named the "Sri Lanka National Guard". They were under the command of then- Lieutenant Colonel D. W. Hapuarachchi (who was also a major general) SLSR as Commandant SLNG, thus becoming the largest Regiment in the Sri Lanka Army at the time.

== Units ==
No	Unit	Formed	Disbanded	Notes
1	1st Sri Lanka National Guard	1 November 1989		
2	2nd Sri Lanka National Guard	15 July 1990		
3	3rd Sri Lanka National Guard	14 July 1990		
4	4th Sri Lanka National Guard	17 August 1990		
5	5th Sri Lanka National Guard	1 November 1990		
6	6th Sri Lanka National Guard	1 November 1990		
7	7th Sri Lanka National Guard	1 November 1990		Later converted as 7 (V) Sri Lanka Armoured Corps on 23 April 1998 and re-established on 23 July 2007
8	8th Sri Lanka National Guard	1 November 1990		Later converted as 12 (V) Sri Lanka Artillery on 23 April 1998 and re-established on 15 August 2007
9	9th Sri Lanka National Guard	1 November 1990		
10	10th Sri Lanka National Guard	31 January 1991		
11	11th Sri Lanka National Guard	1 November 1990		
12	12th Sri Lanka National Guard	27 May 1993		
13	13th Sri Lanka National Guard	15 November 1992		
14	14th Sri Lanka National Guard	21 May 1993		
15	15th Sri Lanka National Guard	25 December 1992		
16	16th Sri Lanka National Guard	1 November 1992		
17	17th Sri Lanka National Guard	1 September 1996		
18	18th Sri Lanka National Guard	18 January 1997		
19	19th Sri Lanka National Guard	18 January 1997		
20	20th Sri Lanka National Guard	29 October 1996	20 July 2018	
21	21st Sri Lanka National Guard	28 July 1998		Later converted as 5 (V) Mechanized Infantry Regiment on 01 June 2010
22	22nd Sri Lanka National Guard	28 July 1998	20 July 2018	
23	23rd Sri Lanka National Guard	1 July 2006	31 August 2018	
24	24th Sri Lanka National Guard	1 December 2007	10 August 2018	
25	25th Sri Lanka National Guard	1 December 2007	31 August 2018	
26	26th Sri Lanka National Guard	30 March 2008	20 July 2018	
27	27th Sri Lanka National Guard	1 August 2008	5 March 2015	
28	28th Sri Lanka National Guard	27 September 2008	15 February 2015	
29	29th Sri Lanka National Guard	4 November 2008	2 June 2015	
30	30th Sri Lanka National Guard	7 December 2008	19 June 2015	
31	31st Sri Lanka National Guard	26 December 2008	7 September 2015	
32	32nd Sri Lanka National Guard	3 January 2009		Later converted as 6 (V) Sri Lanka Army General Service Corps on 5 May 2012
33	33rd Sri Lanka National Guard	8 March 2009		Later converted as 15 (V) Sri Lanka Engineers on 3 February 2014
34	34th Sri Lanka National Guard	8 March 2009	25 March 2015	
35	35th Sri Lanka National Guard	15 March 2009	25 February 2012	
36	36th Sri Lanka National Guard	28 April 2009	14 January 2011	
37	37th Sri Lanka National Guard	17 November	9 October 2010	
38	1RFT Sri Lanka National Guard	12 June 2009	9 October 2010	
39	HQ Bn Sri Lanka National Guard	29 October 1999		

== Order of precedence ==
Preceded by Sri Lanka Army Pioneer Corps	Order of Precedence	Succeeded by Last in the Order of Precedence

== See also ==
- Sri Lanka Army
- Ceylon National Guard
- Colombo Town Guard
- Sri Lanka Home Guard

== External links and sources ==
- Sri Lanka Army
- Sri Lanka National Guard
