= List of general secretaries of the United National Party =

General Secretary of United National Party
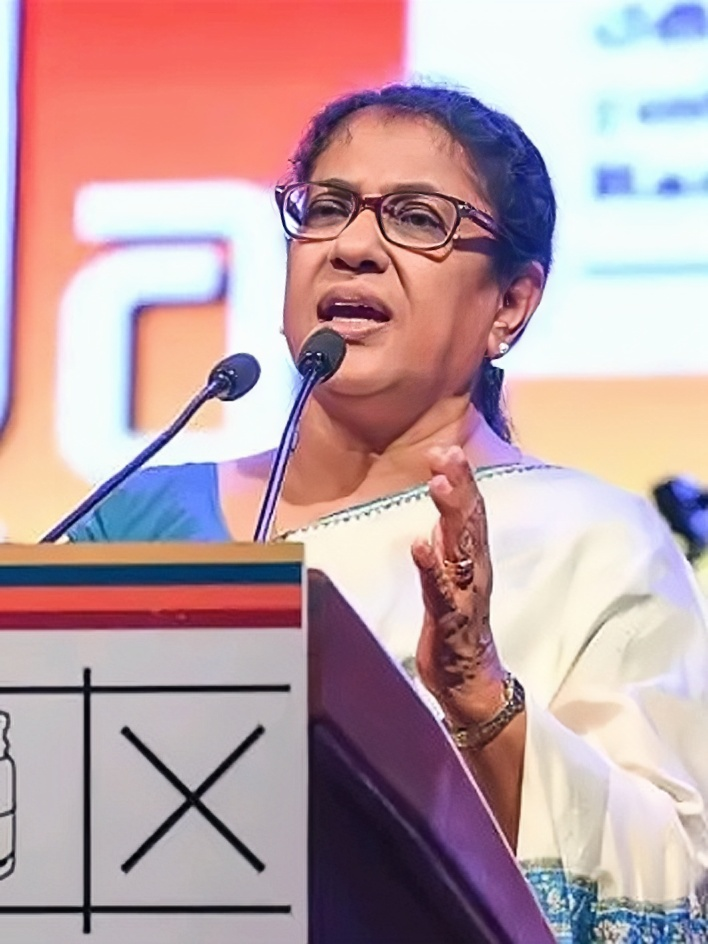
- Incumbent; Thalatha Atukorale since 03 January 2025
- Sirikotha
- Nominator: Leader of the United National Party
- Appointer: Working Committee of the United National Party
- Formation: 1947
- First holder: H. W. Amarasuriya
- Website: www.unp.lk

The General Secretary of the United National Party is one of the highest positions in the 80-year-old Sri Lankan party. The General Secretary holds the powers of calling working committee meetings of the party and singing nominations for the elections.

Thalatha Atukorale is the current General Secretary of the UNP.

== Appointment ==
The General Secretary is appointed with the approval of the other working committee members of the party. The party leader nominates a suitable member to the post when the post is vacant.

== Past Secretaries ==
H. W. Amarasuriya was the first general secretary of the United National Party. Harsha Abeywardena, Sirisena Cooray, Gamini Wijesekere, Senarath Kapukotuwa and Tissa Attanayake are some of the party members who were the general secretaries in the past. Kapukotuwa held the General Secretary position of UNP from 2001 to 2004. Tissa Attanayake was one of the longest serving secretaries of the party but resigned from the position days before the presidential elections of 2015.
