= Tissa Attanayake =

Sri Lankan politician

Hon. Tissa Attanayake
- තිස්ස අත්තනායක திஸ்ஸ அத்தநாயக்க

Minister of Heath
- In office 2014 December – 2015 January
- Preceded by: Maithripala Sirisena
- Succeeded by: Rajitha Senaratne

Minister of Central Region Development
- In office 2001–2004

Member of Parliament for Kandy
- In office 1989–2010

Member of Parliament for National List
- In office 20 August 2020 – 24 September 2024
- In office 2010–2015

General Secretary of United National Party
- In office 2007–2014
- Succeeded by: Kabir Hashim

Personal details
- Born: Attanayake Mudiyanselage Kudabanda Tissa Attanayake; 17 May 1961 (age 64)
- Party: Samagi Jana Balawegaya (2020 - ) United National Party (1989-2014)
- Other political affiliations: United National Front (1989-2014)

Attanayake Mudiyanselage Kudabanda Tissa Attanayake is a Sri Lankan politician, who is a National List member of the Parliament of Sri Lanka. He was first elected to parliament in 1989. Former general secretary of United National Party, Attanayake was appointed a Minister under the UNP government in 2001 and later by Rajapaksa in 2014. He only served 20 days under Rajapaksa. He resides in Colombo.

Attanayake a loyal member of the United National Party member served as the General Secretary under Ranil Wickramasinghe until he resign from the post just months before the 2015 presidential election to support then president Rajapaksa. He alleged that in addition to the agreements reached with various political parties and organizations in public, Common Candidate Maithripala Sirisena has also signed different deals with those parties in private. UNP Leader Ranil Wickremesinghe also said that he wrote to the IGP requesting an inquiry into the concocted agreement and forgery as it carries similar signatures of the duo.

He was later arrested by the Criminal Investigation Department (CID).

He was released on bail, following the courts ruling that they did not have enough evidence to hold him in remand captivity.
