= Thalatha Atukorale =

Sri Lankan politician (born 1963)

Hon. Thalatha Atukorale
- තලතා අතුකෝරල தலதா அத்துக்கோரல
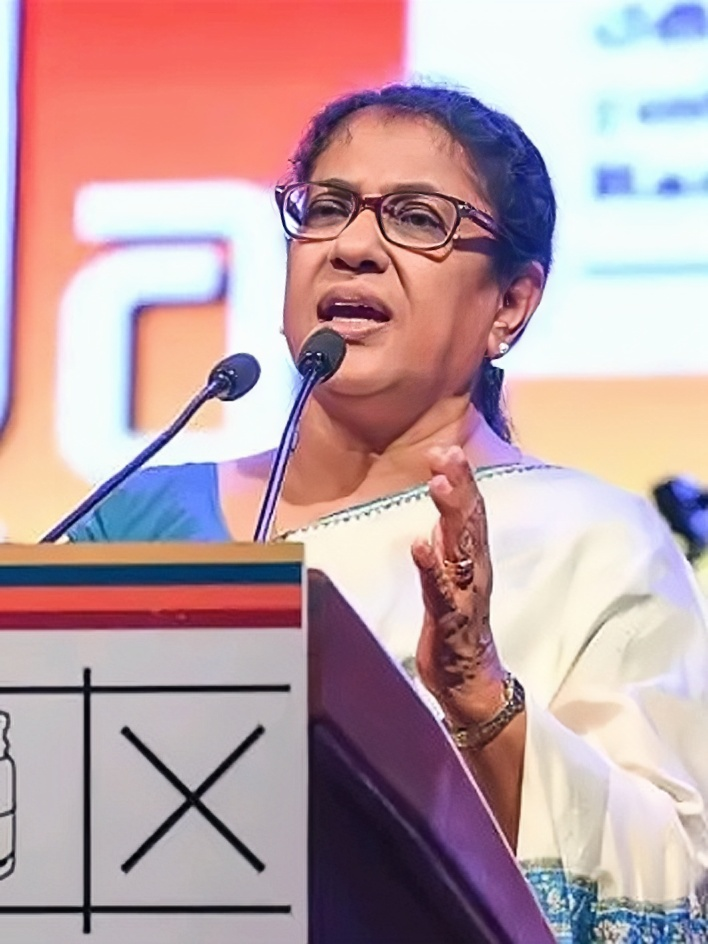
- Atukorale in 2024

General Secretary of the United National Party
- Incumbent
- Assumed office 03 January 2025
- Preceded by: Palitha Range Bandara

Chairwoman of the Samagi Vanitha Balawegaya
- In office 13 July 2020 – 22 August 2024
- Preceded by: Position established
- Succeeded by: Rohini Kumari Wijerathna

Minister of Justice
- In office 25 August 2017 – 22 November 2019
- President: Maithripala Sirisena
- Prime Minister: Ranil Wickremesinghe
- Preceded by: Wijeyadasa Rajapakshe
- Succeeded by: Nimal Siripala de Silva

Minister of Prison Reforms
- In office 1 May 2018 – 22 November 2019
- President: Maithripala Sirisena
- Prime Minister: Ranil Wickremesinghe
- Preceded by: D.M. Swaminathan

Minister of Foreign Employment Promotion & Welfare
- In office 12 January 2015 – 25 February 2018
- President: Maithripala Sirisena
- Prime Minister: Ranil Wickremesinghe
- Preceded by: Dilan Perera
- Succeeded by: Harin Fernando

Member of Parliament for Ratnapura District
- In office 22 April 2004 – 21 August 2024
- Majority: 113,617 preferential votes

Personal details
- Born: 30 May 1963 (age 62)
- Party: United National Party (2004–2020, since 2024)
- Other political affiliations: Samagi Jana Balawegaya (2020–2024)
- Profession: Attorney-at-Law

Thalatha Atukorale (born 30 May 1963) is a Sri Lankan politician and attorney-at-law. She has served as the current General Secretary of the United National Party (UNP) since January 2025, becoming the first woman to hold the position.

Atukorale previously served as the Minister of Foreign Employment Promotion and Welfare from 2015 to 2018 under president Maithripala Sirisena, and as Minister of Justice from 2017 to 2019, the first woman to hold the portfolio in Sri Lanka.

She also chaired the Samagi Vanitha Balawegaya, the women’s wing of the Samagi Jana Balawegaya, from May 2020 until her resignation in August 2024.

== Political career ==
Atukorale entered active politics in 2004 following the death of her brother, Gamini Atukorale, a former cabinet minister and deputy leader of the United National Party. She was elected to parliament in 2004, 2010, 2015, and 2020 from the Ratnapura Electoral District.

She resigned from parliament on 21 August 2024, delivering a parliamentary address that included a strong critique of her party’s leader and presidential candidate, Sajith Premadasa.

== Electoral history ==
Electoral history of Thalatha Atukorale
Year	Constituency	Party	Alliance	Votes	Result
2004	Ratnapura District	UNP	UNF	113,617	Elected
2010	Ratnapura District	UNP	UNF	64,592	Elected
2015	Ratnapura District	UNP	UNFGG	145,828	Elected
2020	Ratnapura District	SJB	SJB	45,105	Elected

== See also ==
- List of political families in Sri Lanka
- Minister of Justice (Sri Lanka)
