= Ruwan Wijewardene =

Sri Lankan politician (born 1975)

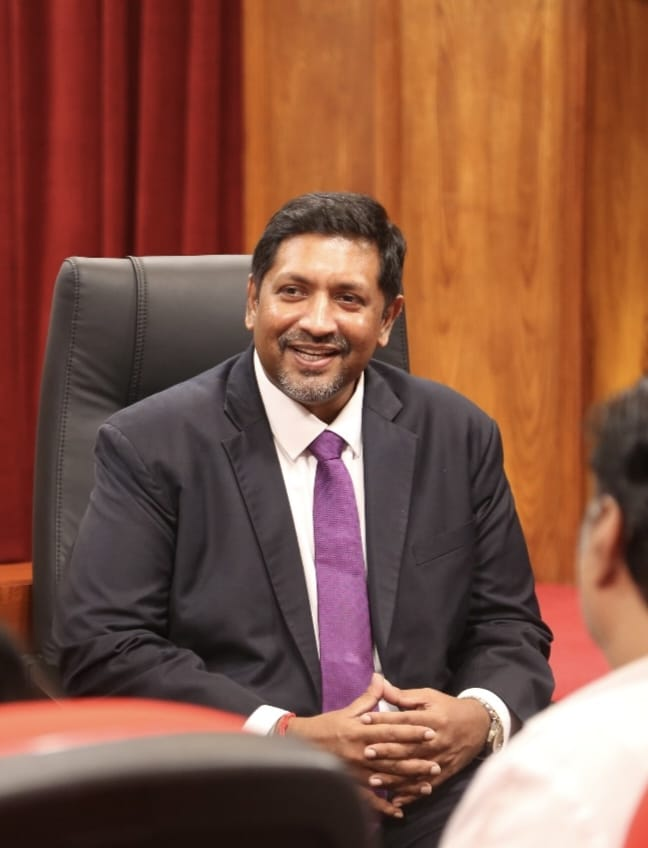

Deputy Leader of the United National Party
- Incumbent
- Assumed office 14 September 2020
- Preceded by: Sajith Premadasa

Member of Parliament for Gampaha District
- In office 22 April 2010 – 3 March 2020
- Majority: 157,932 Preferential Votes

State Minister of Defence
- In office 12 January 2015 – 17 November 2019
- President: Maithripala Sirisena
- Prime Minister: Ranil Wickremesinghe

Non-cabinet Minister of Mass Media
- In office 22 February 2019 – 17 November 2019
- President: Maithripala Sirisena
- Prime Minister: Ranil Wickremesinghe

Personal details
- Born: 4 August 1975 (age 51)
- Party: United National Party
- Education: S. Thomas' Preparatory School, Colombo, Sri Lanka; University of Sussex
- Occupation: Politician

Dinendra Ruwan Wijewardene (Sinhala: දිනේන්ද්‍ර රුවන් විජෙවර්ධන) (born 4 August 1975) is a Sri Lankan politician and served as the Senior advisor to then president Ranil Wickremesinghe on Climate change. He was the former State Minister of Defence and former Mass Media non-cabinet Minister. He was a former Member of Parliament for Gampaha District. Also he is the Deputy Leader of the United National Party and chief organiser for Kelaniya Electorate.

Prior to entering parliament in 2010, he was a member of the Western Provincial Council. He was appointed as the acting minister of defence few times after 2019.

== Early life ==
Born to a political dynasty, he is the youngest son of Ranjani Senanayake and Ranjith Wijewardene (Chairman of Wijeya Newspapers). His maternal great-grandfather, Rt Hon D.S Senanayake, was the first prime minister of Ceylon and his grand uncle, Dudley Senanayake, was the second prime minister of Ceylon and went on to become prime minister two more times during the 1950s and 1960s. His paternal grandfather, D. R. Wijewardena, was a press baron who was a leader in the Sri Lankan independence movement. A successful entrepreneur, he established Lake House newspapers and played a major role in the independence movement. Ruwan Wijewardene is a nephew of the first executive president J.R. Jayewardene of Sri Lanka and the cousin of Ranil Wickremesinghe, the former President of Sri Lanka.

== Education ==
Wijewardene completed his primary and secondary education at St. Thomas' Preparatory School. He then pursued further studies at the University of Sussex in the United Kingdom, where he earned a BA in Political science.

== Political career ==
Wijewardene contested the Western Provincial elections in 2009 and was a member of the Western Provincial Council until 2010. He stood for parliamentary elections 2010 and secured the highest number of preference votes from Gampaha District. He lost his seat in parliament in 2020 general elections. He was elected as deputy leader of the UNP on 14 September 2020 and he is tipped to be the next Leader of the United National Party.

== See also ==
- List of political families in Sri Lanka
- List of Govigama people
