= Sri Lanka Rifle Corps =

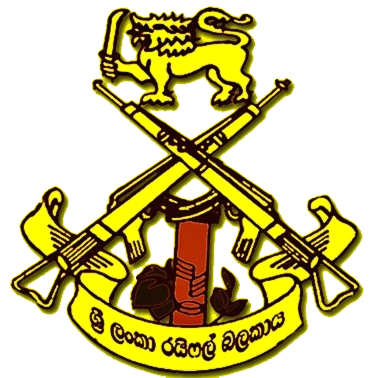
- Sri Lanka Rifle Corps crest
- Active: 1984.12.10 - Present
- Country: Sri Lanka
- Branch: Sri Lanka Army
- Type: Infantry
- Role: Infantry
- Size: 2 Battalion
- Part of: Sri Lanka Army Volunteer Force
- Garrison/HQ: 1st Battalion Headquarters, Pallekele 2nd Battalion Headquarters,Buddankotte
- Motto: "Serve to Others" "පරාර්ථයේ යෙදෙමි"
- Colors: Bottle Green & Golden Yellow
- March: Colonel Bogey March
- Mascot: The Great Horse "Rifle"
- Anniversaries: 1984/12/10 - 1 SLRC & 2006/02/15 - 2 SLRC
- Engagements: Insurrection 1987-89; Sri Lankan Civil War; Digana RIOTS 2018

Commanders
- Commanding Officer 1 SLRC: Lieutenant Colonel BWGPHK Bandara USP SLAC
- Second in Command: Major HMRPB Herath SLRC
- Adjutant: 2/Lt KMPVW Bandara SLRC
- Intelligence Officer: 2/Lt MATD Mallawage SLRC
- Commanding Officer 2 SLRC: Lt Col TMDD Meegolla RWP RSP psc SLLI
- Second in Command: Major CC Mudannayake SLRC
- Adjutant: Lt Deemantha Jayasinghe SLRC
- Coordinating Officer SLRC/SLAPC: Col ARD De Silva KSP SLAPC
- Notable commanders: General Ranjan Wijeratne Lt col Lucky (laxshman) Ratnaweera.

Insignia
- Abbreviation: SLRC

The Sri Lanka Rifle Corps (SLRC) is a regiment of the Sri Lanka Army. It is made up of two volunteer (reserve) battalions. It has been formed with personnel from the central highlands and the many plantations in the Central Province of Sri Lanka. It is the only regiment of the Sri Lanka Army that recruits its personnel from a particular geographical area and protecting the central higlands vital/key points.

== History ==
The origins of the Rifle Corps can be traced back to the colonial era when the British planters in the central highlands of Ceylon formed a volunteer regiment called the Ceylon Planters Rifle Corps in 1887 which was attached to the Ceylon Defence Force. This regiment was disbanded when the Ceylon Army was formed in 1949.

In the 1980s the management of the many plantations called for the recreation of a volunteer Rifle Corps in the highlands. Due to these requests two battalions were raised in Pallekele and Neuchatel Estate Neboda on 15 February 1985 by Brigadier G. R. Jayasinghe, assisted by Lt-Colonel Wettasinghe and Captain P. Abeyratne. The first commanding Officers were Lieutenant Colonel (later General) Ranjan Wijeratne (2nd Battalion) who was the Chairman of the State Plantations Corporation and Lieutenant Colonel P.R Seneviratne (1st Battalion) who was the Chairman of the Janatha Estate Development Board.

These two battalions have deployed in the Northern and Eastern Provinces due to the Civil War. Currently, the regiment is deployed in the Central Province provides security to the vital sectors of dams and hydroelectric projects of the Mahaweli Development programme. A detachment is maintained by the regiment in Kandy for the protection of the Temple of the Tooth.

== Units ==
- 1st Battalion, Sri Lanka Rifle Corps (Formed on 10 December 1984)
- 2nd Battalion, Sri Lanka Rifle Corps (Formed on 15 February 2006)

== Notable members ==
- General Ranjan Wijeratne - Former Minister of Foreign Affairs & Minister of State for Defence.
- Major Surendra Lal Wijewardene - Former Adjutant of the SLRC
- Lt col Lakshman Ratnaweere, (SLRC) - Board 4 and 5 chairman JEDB

== Order of precedence ==
Preceded by Sri Lanka Army Women's Corps	Sri Lanka Rifle Corps	Succeeded by Sri Lanka Army Pioneer Corps

== See also ==
- Sri Lanka Army
- Ceylon Planters Rifle Corps
