= Ceylon National Guard =

- Active: 1962 - 1980
- Country: Sri Lanka
- Branch: Sri Lanka Army
- Type: Volunteer
- Role: Infantry
- Size: 2 Battalions
- Part of: Sri Lanka Army Volunteer Force
- Nickname: CNG
- Engagements: Task Force Anti Illicit Immigration, 1971 Insurrection

The Ceylon National Guard (CNG) was a former Volunteer regiment of the Sri Lanka Army that existed from 1963 to 1980. The CNG was formed in 1962 as part of the reforms to the Ceylon Volunteer Force in the Ceylon Army following the 1962 Ceylonese coup d'état attempt in which several volunteer units were implicated. The 2nd (Volunteer) Coastal Artillery Regiment, Ceylon Artillery and the 2nd (Volunteer) Signals, Ceylon Signals Corps were disbanded and personal from these units who were found to be not part of the attempt coup were re-grouped as the 1st Battalion, CNG and 2nd Battalion, CNG. The CNG was mobilized for duty with the Task Force Anti Illicit Immigration and during the 1971 JVP Insurrection. It was finally disbanded in 1980 after the 1st Battalion was transferred to the Sri Lanka Armoured Corps as the 2nd (Volunteer) Regiment, Sri Lanka Armoured Corps in 1979 and the 2nd Battalion was transferred to the Sri Lanka Artillery as the 5th (Volunteer) Regiment, Sri Lanka Artillery in 1980.

== Units ==
- 1st Battalion, Ceylon National Guard
- 2nd Battalion, Ceylon National Guard

== Notable members ==
- Karu Jayasuriya - Former Speaker of Parliament and Minister

== See also ==
- Sri Lanka National Guard
