= Ceylon Railway Engineer Corps =

- Active: 1943 - 1945, 1955 - 1956
- Country: Ceylon (Sri Lanka)
- Branch: Ceylon Army
- Role: Rail Transport

Ceylon Railway Engineer Corps was a departmental corps of the Ceylon Defense Force from 1943 to 1945 and of the Ceylon Volunteer Force 1955 to 1956 consisting of staff from the Ceylon Government Railway. The government hoped to minimized the effects to the Post and Telegraph services in the event of trade union action (strikes were common) by mobilizing the personnel attached to this unit. However it was disbanded in 1956 when the leftist S.W.R.D. Bandaranaike became prime minister.
