= Sirikotha =

Sirikotha Mandiraya සිරිකොත මන්දිරය

General information
- Location: Kotte, No. 400, Sri Jayawardenepura Kotte, Sri Lanka, Colombo, Sri Lanka
- Client: United National Party
- Owner: United National Party

Sirikotha also known as the Srikotha Mandiraya located at No. 400, Sri Jayawardenepura Kotte, Sri Lanka is the official headquarters of the United National Party. The building was built and open in the early 1980s by then party leader President J.R. Jayawardene.

The general secretary of the United National Party is the official trustee of the building,

The building is use for all party activities of the United National Party including the Working Committee, Trade Union, Students' wing and women's meetings. The party also holds the Annual General Meetings and Party Elections in this location. Sirikotha has a media and election operation room.

Sirikotha was damaged from clashes between party supporters in 2012 during a leadership election and was redesigned by renowned architect Mihindu Keertirante. In 2014 Opposition Common Presidential Candidate Maithripala Sirisena received a rousing welcome when he arrived at the UNP headquarters.
