= St John Sri Lanka =

St. John Ambulance Association & Brigade of Sri Lanka
- Active: 1906 - Present
- Role: Volunteer Non-Governmental Organisation
- Headquarters: No. 65/11, Sir Chittampalam A. Gardiner Mawatha, Colombo 02
- Motto: Pro Utilitate Hominum (For The Service of Mankind)
- Web Site: www.stjohnsrilanka.lk

Commanders
- Chief Commander: Prasanthalal De Alwis,

The St. John Ambulance Association and Brigade of Sri Lanka (also often referred to as the St. John Ambulance of Sri Lanka) is a charitable organisation providing healthcare services to the Sri Lankan public. Its members also perform voluntary first aid coverage duties during national events. The headquarters is located at 65/11, Sir Chittampalam A.Gardiner Mawatha, Colombo 02.

== History ==
St. John Ambulance was established in Ceylon in 1906. The National St. John Council was formed in 1967 to govern St. John's activities in Sri Lanka. St. John Sri Lanka has some 50,000 volunteers.

== Former Chief Commanders ==
- Dr. Sarath Samarage
- Dr.Palitha Abeykoon
- Dr. D.W.Weerasuriya
- Dr.J.G.Jayatilake
- Brig.Dr.H.I.K.Fernando
- G.A.Piyadasa

== Activities ==
- First aid training
- Disaster preparedness
- Relief work
- Occupational health & safety
- First-aid in schools
- Public duties - festivals, cricket tests
- Community based nutrition projects

== Cadet Movement ==
St John Ambulance in Sri Lanka largely consists of cadet members - i.e. secondary school students who joined St John as their Co-curricular activity. Currently, various schools are as follows:

Colombo

- Royal College, Colombo
- Hindu College, Colombo
- Prince of Wales' College, Moratuwa
- St. Anthony's College, Kandy
- St. Benedict's College
- Gothami Balika Vidyalaya, Colombo 10
- St. Anthony's Tamil Maha Vidiyalayam, Colombo 14
- Mutuwal Hindu College, Colombo 15
- Zahira College Maradana, Colombo 10

Kalutara

- Sri Sumangala College
- Kalutara Vidyalaya

Nuwara Eliya

- Poramadulla Central College

Kandy

- Zahira College, Gampola
- St.Mary's College, Nawalapitiya

Galle

- Mahinda College

== Awards and Commendations ==
Officers and Members of the Brigade are eligible for the following Awards and Commendations:

=== Local Awards ===
- 5 Years First Aid Efficiency Medal (for 5 years' service)
- Commendation Medal (which carries the post-nominal letters CMSJ)

=== International (Order) Awards ===
- Service Medal of the Order of St John (for 10 years' service)
- Bar to the Service Medal (for each subsequent 5 years' service up to 45 years)
- Gilt Laurel Leaf (for 50 years' service)
- Admission to the Venerable Order of Saint John
  - Serving Brother / Serving Sister (SBStJ or SSStJ)
  - Officer Brother / Officer Sister (OStJ)
  - Commander Brother / Commander Sister (CStJ)
  - Knight / Dame of Grace (KStJ or DStJ), note that this does not entitle the holder to Sir

The grades of the Order are numbered 1 through 6, however, this is not to be confused with the grading of Brigade Officers.

The highest grade in the Order, GCStJ is limited only to the Great Officers of the Order and 21 other individuals. The lowest grade in the Order, Esq StJ is for Personal Esquires for KStJ and above who probably play a role similar to that of an Aide-de-Camp.

== Alliances ==
- United Kingdom - Royal County of Berkshire
- Australia - St. John Australia

== See also ==
- Order of St. John
- St John Ambulance Ranks and Insignia
- Insignia of the Venerable Order of St John
- St. Andrew's Ambulance Association
