= Regimental centre =

The regimental centre of a regiment is its administrative center in the context of a multi-battalion regiment. Common in British Commonwealth such as in the Indian Army and the Sri Lanka Army, regimental centres are similar to regimental depots of the British Army. Many regimental centres started off as a headquarters company or battalion, becoming the regimental headquarters tasked with administration of personal, logistics and training. It is headed by the Regimental Centre Commandant.

== List of regimental centres of the Sri Lanka Army ==
- Rock House Army Camp, Colombo (Sri Lanka Armoured Corps)
- Panagoda Cantonment, Panagoda (Sri Lanka Artillery, Sri Lanka Engineers, Sri Lanka Signals Corps, Sri Lanka Light Infantry)
- Ambepussa Camp, Ambepussa (Sri Lanka Sinha Regiment
- Kuruwita Army Camp, Ratnapura (Gemunu Watch)
- Saliyapura Camp, Anuradhapura (Gajaba Regiment)
- Boyagane Camp, Kurunegala (Vijayabahu Infantry Regiment)

== See also ==
- Regimental depot
- Large regiment
