= Bandara (name) =

Bandara is both a given name and a surname. Notable people with the name include:

- Bandara Wijethunga (1939–1990), Sri Lankan poet
- Ajith Bandara, Sri Lankan singer
- Aravinda Bandara (born 1995), Sri Lankan cricketer
- Ashen Bandara (born 1998) Sri Lankan cricketer
- Asiri Bandara (born 1991), Sri Lankan cricketer
- Chamika Bandara (born 1980), Sri Lankan cricketer
- Chaminda Bandara (born 1987), Sri Lankan cricketer
- Chandima Vijaya Bandara (born 1995), Sri Lankan cricketer
- Chandrarathna Bandara, Sri Lankan novelist
- Danusika Bandara (born 1986), Sri Lankan cricketer
- H. G. S. Bandara (died 2009), Sri Lankan soldier
- Janaka Priyantha Bandara (born 1968), Sri Lankan governor and diplomat
- Jayavira Bandara, King of Kandy
- Jayaweera Bandara (cricketer) (born 1970), Sri Lankan cricketer
- Karalliyadde Bandara, King of Kandy
- Kaveen Bandara (born 1997), Sri Lankan cricketer
- Kavindu Bandara (born 1997), Sri Lankan cricketer
- Mahesh Bandara (born 1982), Sri Lankan cricketer
- Malinga Bandara (born 1979), Sri Lankan cricketer
- Nalin Bandara (born 1974), Sri Lankan politician
- Nikapitiye Bandara of Sitawaka, king of Sitawaka
- Nimal Bandara, Sri Lankan politician
- Nimesh Bandara (born 1997), Sri Lankan cricketer
- Palitha Bandara, Sri Lankan para athlete
- Palitha Range Bandara (born 1962), Sri Lankan politician
- Praveena Bandara, 18th Chairperson of the Sri Lanka Army Women's Corps Seva Vanitha Unit
- Raigama Bandara, ruler of Raigama
- Ranjith Bandara (born 1961), Sri Lankan economist
- Ranjith Madduma Bandara (born 1954), Sri Lankan politician
- Rohana Bandara (born 1977), Sri Lankan politician
- Senesh Dissanaike Bandara, Sri Lankan film director
- Shantha Bandara (1951−1990), Sri Lankan rebel
- Sugath Chandrasiri Bandara (died 2009), Sri Lanka Army soldier
- Veediya Bandara, commander-in-chief of the Kingdom of Kotte
- Vidanalange Bandara (born 1991), Sri Lankan boxer
- Wasantha Yapa Bandara, Sri Lankan politician
- Yamasinghe Bandara, son in law of Karaliyadde Bandara
- Madduma Bandara Ehelapola, national hero of Sri Lanka
- Chandrani Bandara Jayasinghe, Sri Lankan politician
- Tikiri Bandara Panabokke I, Ceylonese legislator
- Tikiri Bandara Panabokke II (1883–1963), Ceylonese legislator
- Janaka Bandara Tennakoon (born 1953), Sri Lankan politician and minister
- Dingiri Bandara Welagedara (1915–1989), Sri Lankan politician
