= Chandrasiri =

Chandrasiri චන්ද්‍රසිරි
- Pronunciation: Candrasiri
- Language: Sinhala

Origin
- Region of origin: Sri Lanka

Chandrasiri (Sinhala: චන්ද්‍රසිරි, romanized: Candrasiri) is a Sinhalese surname. It is also a male given name.

== Notable people ==
=== Given name ===
- Chandrasiri Gajadeera (1946–2019), Sri Lankan politician
- Chandrasiri Kodithuwakku (1949–2016), Sri Lankan actor
- Sarath Chandrasiri Mayadunne, Sri Lankan politician
- Sarath Chandrasiri Muthukumarana, Sri Lankan politician
- Sugath Chandrasiri Bandara (died 2009), Sri Lankan army officer

=== Surname ===
- G. A. Chandrasiri, Sri Lankan army officer
- Jayantha Chandrasiri (born 1959), Sri Lankan journalist
- Sarath Chandrasiri, Sri Lankan actor
- Somaweera Chandrasiri (1909–1971), Ceylonese politician
- Vindika Chandrasiri (born 1988), Sri Lankan cricketer
