= Rathna Ella =

Coordinates: 7°00′N 80°59′E

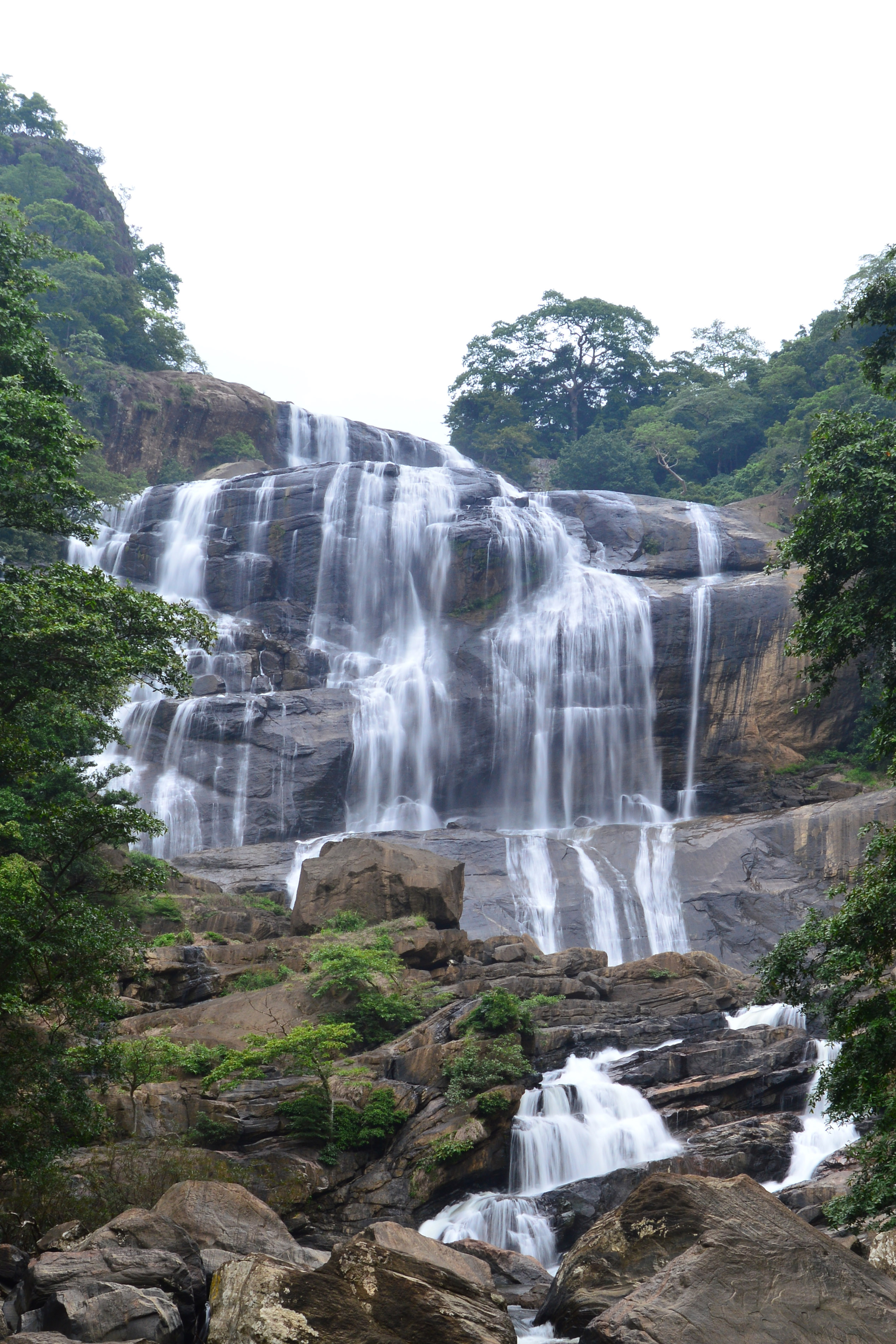
- Rathna Ella Falls
- Interactive map of Rathna Ella
- Location: Hasalaka, Sri Lanka
- Total height: 101 m (331 ft)

Rathna Ella is a waterfall in Hasalaka, Sri Lanka. It is 101 meters (331 ft), and is the 14th tallest waterfall in Sri Lanka. It springs from the Knuckles mountain range, and supplies water for irrigation and paddy cultivation to the local community, sustaining approximately 200 farmers.

The waterfall is protected by an organization called "Soba Mithuro of Rathna Ella", which was registered officially in 2018.

== See also ==
- List of waterfalls of Sri Lanka
