= Sugath =

Sugath is a given name. Notable people with the name include:

- Sugath Chandrasiri Bandara (died 2009), Sri Lankan soldier
- Sugath Thilakaratne (born 1973), Sri Lankan athlete
