= Regimental depot =

Home base of a regiment

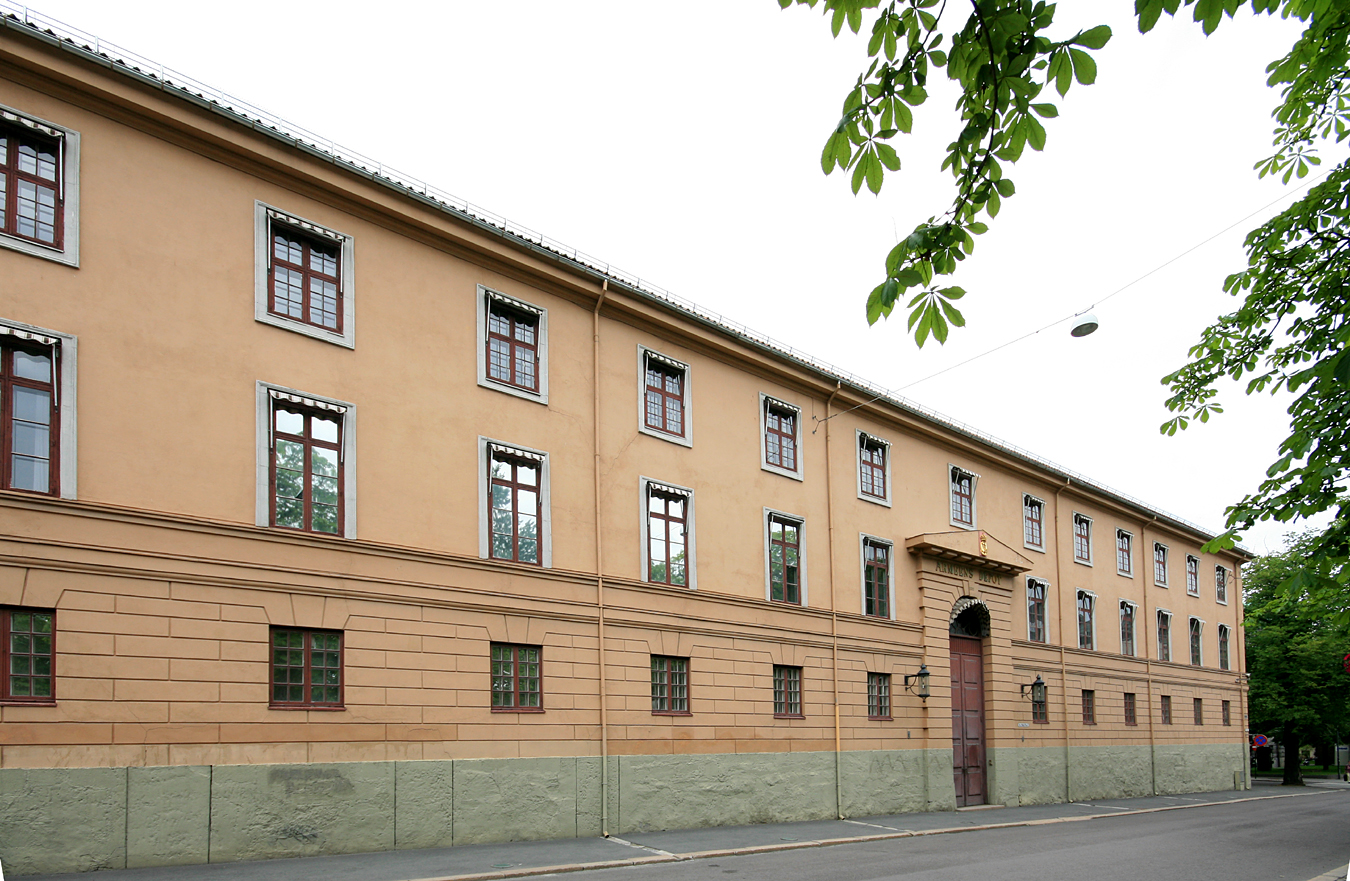
Armeens depot, Akershus fortress

The regimental depot of a regiment is its home base for recruiting and training. It is also where soldiers and officers awaiting discharge or postings are based and where injured soldiers return to full fitness after discharge from hospital before returning to full duty. Normally, a variety of regimental stores will also be kept at the depot. The regimental depot is not the same as the regimental headquarters (where the main officers' mess and certain central functions are based), though in practice the two will often be co-located.

== United Kingdom ==
In a military dictionary of 1802, the word Depot is given multiple meanings: primarily it is said to describe 'any particular place in which military stores are deposited for the use of the army'; but 'it also signifies an appropriated fort, or place, for the reception of recruits, or detached parties, belonging to different regiments'. At that time Maidstone Barracks served as depot for the British Cavalry; while the depot for the Infantry (established at Chatham Barracks in the 1770s) had moved in 1801 to Albany Barracks on the Isle of Wight. Later, the depot at Maidstone served specifically as a recruitment centre for cavalry regiments stationed in India (and in 1830 a similar arrangement was established at Chatham for infantry regiments stationed in India and New South Wales). A second Cavalry Depot was later established at Canterbury; in 1865 the Maidstone depot closed and Canterbury alone then served as home depot for the cavalry regiments overseas (with additional accommodation provided when necessary in Colchester). In 1897 the Cavalry Depot at Canterbury was closed, with responsibility for recruitment devolving on the home-based regiments (which began to be affiliated with regiments serving overseas for the purpose of recruitment).

=== List of UK Infantry Regimental Depots in the 1880s ===
A list of barracks in Britain and Ireland, either designated or newly built to serve as localization depots for infantry regiments in the wake of the Cardwell Reforms of the 1870s and the Childers Reforms which followed.

- Caterham Barracks, Surrey (Foot Guard regiments)
- Glencorse Barracks, Midlothian (Royal Scots (Lothian Regiment))
- Stoughton Barracks, Guildford (Queen's (Royal West Surrey Regiment))
- Canterbury Barracks (Buffs (East Kent Regiment))
- Bowerham Barracks, Lancaster (King's Own (Royal Lancaster Regiment))
- Fenham Barracks, Newcastle upon Tyne (Northumberland Fusiliers & Durham Light Infantry)
- Budbrooke Barracks, Warwick (Royal Warwickshire Regiment)
- Hounslow Barracks (Royal Fusiliers (City of London Regiment) & The (Duke of Cambridge's Own) Middlesex Regiment)
- Peninsula Barracks, Warrington (King's (Liverpool Regiment) & Prince of Wales's Volunteers (South Lancashire Regiment))
- Britannia Barracks, Norwich (Norfolk Regiment)
- Sobraon Barracks, Lincoln (The Lincolnshire Regiment)
- Topsham Barracks, Exeter (Devonshire Regiment)
- Gibraltar Barracks, Bury St Edmunds (Suffolk Regiment)
- Jellalabad Barracks, Taunton (Prince Albert's (Somersetshire Light Infantry))
- Imphal Barracks, York (Prince of Wales's Own (West Yorkshire Regiment))
- Victoria Barracks, Beverley (East Yorkshire Regiment)
- Kempston Barracks (Bedfordshire Regiment)
- Glen Parva Barracks (Leicestershire Regiment)
- Victoria Barracks, Clonmel (The Royal Irish Regiment)
- Richmond Barracks, North Yorkshire (Princess of Wales's Own (Yorkshire Regiment))
- Wellington Barracks, Bury (Lancashire Fusiliers)
- Ayr Barracks (Royal Scots Fusiliers)
- Chester Castle (Cheshire Regiment)
- Hightown Barracks, Wrexham (Royal Welch Fusiliers)
- The Barracks, Brecon (South Wales Borderers)
- Berwick Barracks (King's Own Borderers)
- Hamilton Barracks (The Cameronians (Scotch Rifles))
- St Lucia Barracks, Omagh (Royal Inniskilling Fusiliers)
- Horfield Barracks, Bristol (Gloucestershire Regiment)
- Norton Barracks (Worcestershire Regiment)
- Burnley Barracks (East Lancashire Regiment)
- The Barracks, Kingston upon Thames (East Surrey Regiment)
- Victoria Barracks, Bodmin (Duke of Cornwall's Light Infantry)
- Wellesley Barracks, Halifax (Duke of Wellington's (West Riding Regiment))
- Carlisle Castle (Border Regiment)
- The Barracks, Chichester (Royal Sussex Regiment)
- Lower Barracks, Winchester (Hampshire Regiment)
- Whittington Barracks, Lichfield (South Staffordshire Regiment) & (The (Prince of Wales's) North Staffordshire Regiment)
- Dorchester Depot Barracks (Dorsetshire Regiment)
- Maindy Barracks, Cardiff (Welch Regiment)
- Queen's Barracks, Perth (Black Watch)
- Bullingdon Barracks, Cowley (Oxfordshire Light Infantry)
- Warley Barracks (Essex Regiment)
- Normanton Barracks, Derby (Sherwood Foresters (Derbyshire Regiment))
- Fulwood Barracks, Preston (Loyal North Lancashire Regiment)
- Northampton Barracks (Northamptonshire Regiment)
- Brock Barracks, Reading (Princess Charlotte of Wales's (Berkshire Regiment))
- Maidstone Barracks (Queen's Own (Royal West Kent Regiment))
- Pontefract Barracks (King's Own Light Infantry (South Yorkshire Regiment) & York and Lancaster Regiment)
- Copthorne Barracks, Shrewsbury The King's Light Infantry (Shropshire Regiment)
- Upper Barracks, Winchester (King's Royal Rifle Corps & The Prince Consort's Own Rifle Brigade)
- Le Marchant Barracks, Devizes (The (Duke of Edinburgh's) Wiltshire Regiment)
- Ladysmith Barracks, Manchester (Manchester Regiment)
- Garrioch Barracks, Glasgow (Highland Light Infantry)
- Fort George, Ardersier (Seaforth Highlanders (Duke of Albany's/Ross-shire Buffs))
- Castlehill Barracks, Aberdeen (Gordon Highlanders)
- Cameron Barracks, Inverness (Queen's Own Cameron Highlanders)
- Victoria Barracks, Belfast (Royal Irish Rifles)
- Gough Barracks, Armagh (Princess Victoria's (Royal Irish Fusiliers))
- Castlebar Barracks (Connaught Rangers)
- Stirling Castle (Princess Louise's (Argyll and Sutherland Highlanders))
- Birr Barracks (Prince of Wales's Leinster Regiment (Royal Canadians))
- Ballymullen Barracks, Tralee (Royal Munster Fusiliers)
- Naas Barracks (Royal Dublin Fusiliers)

=== List of UK Cavalry Regimental Depots in the 1910s ===
A list of barracks in Britain and Ireland designated to serve as depots for cavalry regiments.

- The Cavalry Depot at Howe Barracks
- No.1 (Eastern) Cavalry Depot later No.1 (Lancers) Cavalry Depot at Shrapnel Barracks, Woolwich (5th Royal Irish Lancers, the 9th Queen's Royal Lancers, the 12th Royal Lancers, the 16th The Queen's Lancers, the 17th Lancers and the 21st Lancers)
- No.2 (Irish) Cavalry Depot later No.2 (Hussars) Cavalry Depot at Richmond Barracks, Dublin (4th Queen's Own Hussars, the 8th King's Royal Irish Hussars, the 11th Hussars and the 13th Hussars)
- No.3 (Northern) Cavalry Depot later No.3 (Hussars) Cavalry Depot at Burniston Barracks (10th Royal Hussars, the 14th King's Hussars, the 18th Royal Hussars and the 20th Hussars)
- No.4 (Western) Cavalry Depot later No.4 (Dragoons) Cavalry Depot at Newport Barracks (2nd Dragoon Guards (Queen's Bays), the 3rd Dragoon Guards, the 4th Royal Irish Dragoon Guards, the Carabiniers (6th Dragoon Guards), the 7th Dragoon Guards and the 6th (Inniskilling) Dragoons)
- No.5 (Southern) Cavalry Depot later No.5 (Hussars) Cavalry Depot at Horfield Barracks (3rd The King's Own Hussars, the 7th Queen's Own Hussars, the 15th The King's Hussars and the 19th Royal Hussars)
- No.6 (Scottish) Cavalry Depot later No.6 (Dragoons) Cavalry Depot at Castle Park Barracks (1st King's Dragoon Guards, the 5th Dragoon Guards, the 1st Royal Dragoons and the 2nd Dragoons (Royal Scots Greys))

== French Army ==
In the French Royal Army and Imperial Army, in addition to many of the empire's many puppet states, a dépôt was a battalion in size and would provide drafts to the regular 'field battalions' on a regular basis. If mobilised, the depot itself would become a field battalion led by the depot's second in command, typically a senior captain. Each depot battalion comprised four companies and was commanded by a Major.

== See also ==
- Regimental centre
