= Bandara (disambiguation) =

Bandāra was a Great Officer in the Amātya Mandalaya, or Sinhalese Council of State, in the Sinhalese Kingdoms of premodern Sri Lanka. Bandara may also refer to:

- Bandara (name), people named Bandara
- Bandara (Star Wars), Star Wars creature
- Bandara (genus), the leafhoppers genus in the subfamily Deltocephalinae
