= Sri Lanka Army Special Forces Regiment =

Special Force Regiment
- Special Forces Regiment cap badge
- Active: December 1988 – Present
- Country: Sri Lanka
- Branch: Sri Lanka Army
- Type: Special Forces
- Size: Four Regiments (Fifth Regiment 2009-2012)
- Regimental Headquarters: Naula
- Nickname: SF
- Mottos: අධිෂ්ඨානයෙන් අභීතව අරමුණ කරා Adhisthanayen Abhithawa Aramuna Kara (Sinhala: To the target with determination and bravery Determined, Dared and Done
- Colors: Rana Parashuwa
- Engagements: Sri Lankan Civil War
- Decorations: 5 Parama Weera Vibhushanaya; 51 Weera Wickrama Vibhushanaya; 1212 Rana Wickrama Padakkama; 2417 Rana Sura Padakkama

Commanders
- Brigade Commander, Special Forces Brigade: Brigadier Thushara Mahalekamge
- Colonel of the Regiment: Major General W.T.W.G.IHALAGE
- Notable commanders: General Mahesh Senanayake; Major General G. Hettiarachchi; Colonel A.F. Lafir; Colonel Raj Vijayasiri; Major General W.T.W.G.Ihalage; Lieutenant Colonel J.A.L Jayasinghe Major J.Y Mohotti

The Special Forces Regiment (SF) (Sinhala: විශේෂ බලකාය Visēsha Balakāya;) is a special forces unit of the Sri Lanka Army. Founded in 1986 as a combat tracker team, it was established as a regiment in 1988, and later expanded into a brigade. The unit specialises in a number of roles including counter-terrorism, direct action and covert reconnaissance. Much like the British Army Special Air Service, much of the information about the SF is highly classified due to the secrecy and sensitivity of its operations. The regiment is widely recognized by military analysts as an experienced and highly capable jungle warfare and long-range reconnaissance force due to its extensive combat history.

The Special Forces Regiment currently consists of four regular battalions organized into the Special Forces Brigade, under the operational command of I Corps forming its Special Operations Force along with the Commando Brigade.

== History ==
With the escalation of the Sri Lankan Civil War in the mid-1980s the Sri Lanka Army formed a "Combat Tracker Team" in 1985 to conduct direct action and covert reconnaissance against LTTE units operating in the thick jungles in the northern part of the island in small groups. At its inception this unit was made up of two officers and 38 men under the command of Major Gamini Hettiarachchi from the Sri Lanka Armoured Corps. The Combat Tracker Team became the reconnaissance element of the short-lived Special Service Group (SSG) and was renamed as the Rapid Deployment Force (RDF) (Special Force) in 1985 which operated independently, during which time Lieutenant (later Colonel) A. F. Lafir joined the RDF from the Gajaba Regiment. Following several successful operations, the RDF was gradually expanded to four squadrons. On 10 December 1988, the RDF (SF) was officially designated as the 1 Special Forces Regiment (1 SF) Naula in the Central province under the command of Major G. Hettiarachchi. With the view of increasing its mobility and stroke capacity 1 SF formed Combat Rider Team with assistance from South Africa. The 2 Special Forces Regiment (2 SF) was formed on 18 February 1994 at Monkey Bridge Camp in Trincomalee with detached B, D, and E squadrons of 1 SF under the command of Major Raj Wijesiri. 2 SF soon raised a Combat Diver Team to specializing in amphibious warfare and later moved to Nayaru on the eastern seaboard. On 18 July 1996 the 25 Brigade HQ of the Sri Lanka Army at its base at Mullaitivu came under attack in what is known as the Battle of Mullaitivu. 1SF and 2SF were dropped by helicopter to spearhead in the rescue operation which reached the base on 23 July. Both units suffered heavy casualties including the commanding officer of 1SF, Lieutenant Colonel A. F. Lafir who was posthumously awarded the Parama Weera Vibhushanaya. In August 1996, the 3 Special Forces Regiment (3 SF) was formed with personal from the other two SF regiments to develop amphibious warfare capability to counter activity of the Sea Tigers, it was soon re-tasked to carryout long-range penetration missions in deep into LTTE controlled areas. This resulted in the start of Long Range Reconnaissance Patrol (LRRP) concept in September 1996 with 3 SF based at Vavuniya under the command of Major Mahesh Senanayake. 3 SF rescinded J and K Squadrons and created M Squadron. In December 1996, the Special Forces Brigade was formed bringing 1SF, 2SF and 3SF under its operational command. On 15 June 2008, 4 Special Forces Regiment (4 SF) was raised at SF Training School in Maduru Oya under the command of Major J.P.C. Peiris support the demands of the new northern offensive.

== Organisation ==
The Special Forces Regiment consists of four regular battalions. The Regimental Headquarter which includes the Regimental Centre and the Regimental Headquarter Battalion handles administration while the four regular battalions are organised into the Special Forces Brigade (SF BDE) which comes under the operational command of I Corps.

=== Formations ===
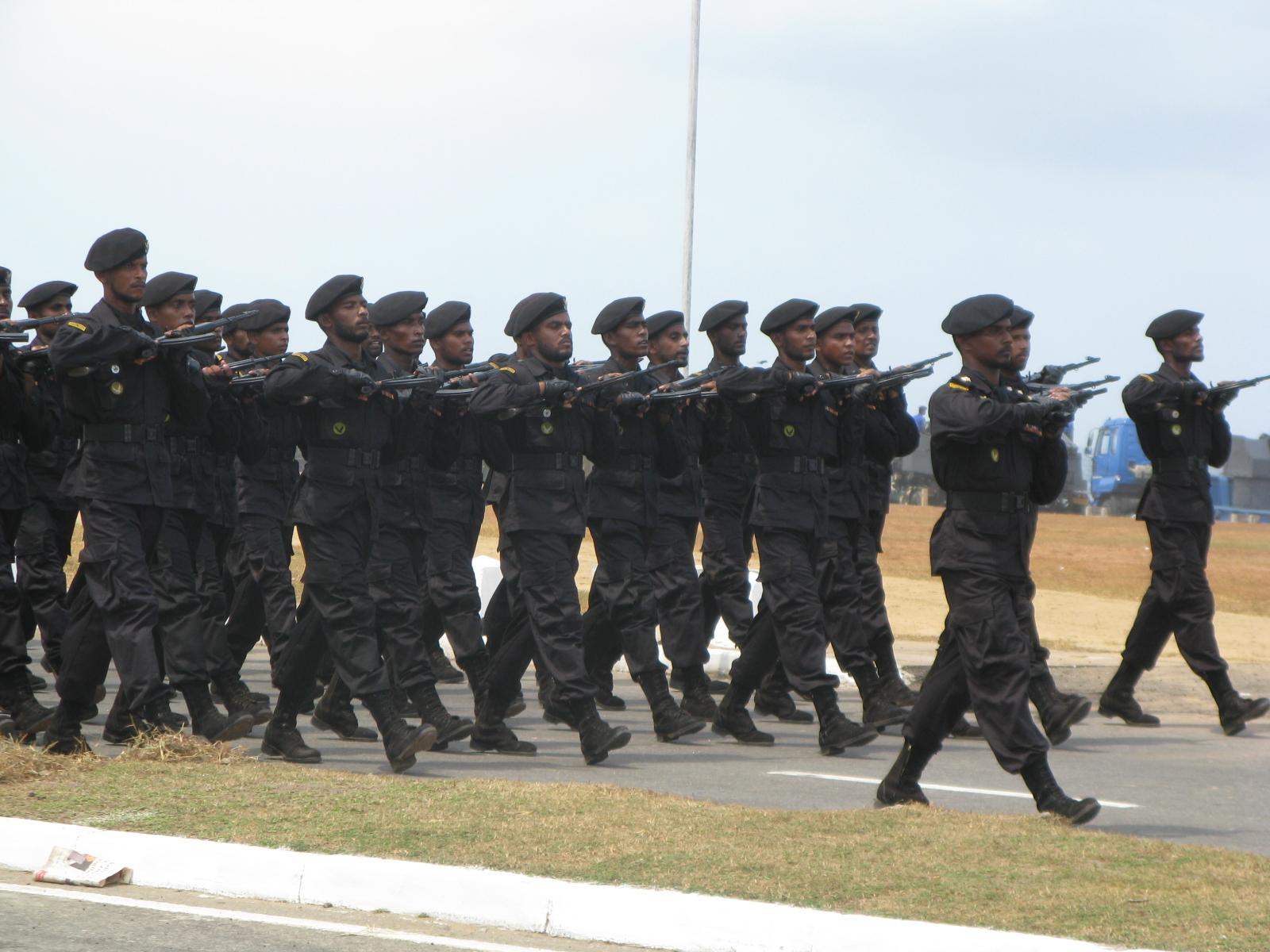
Special Forces soldiers at the Independence day parade.

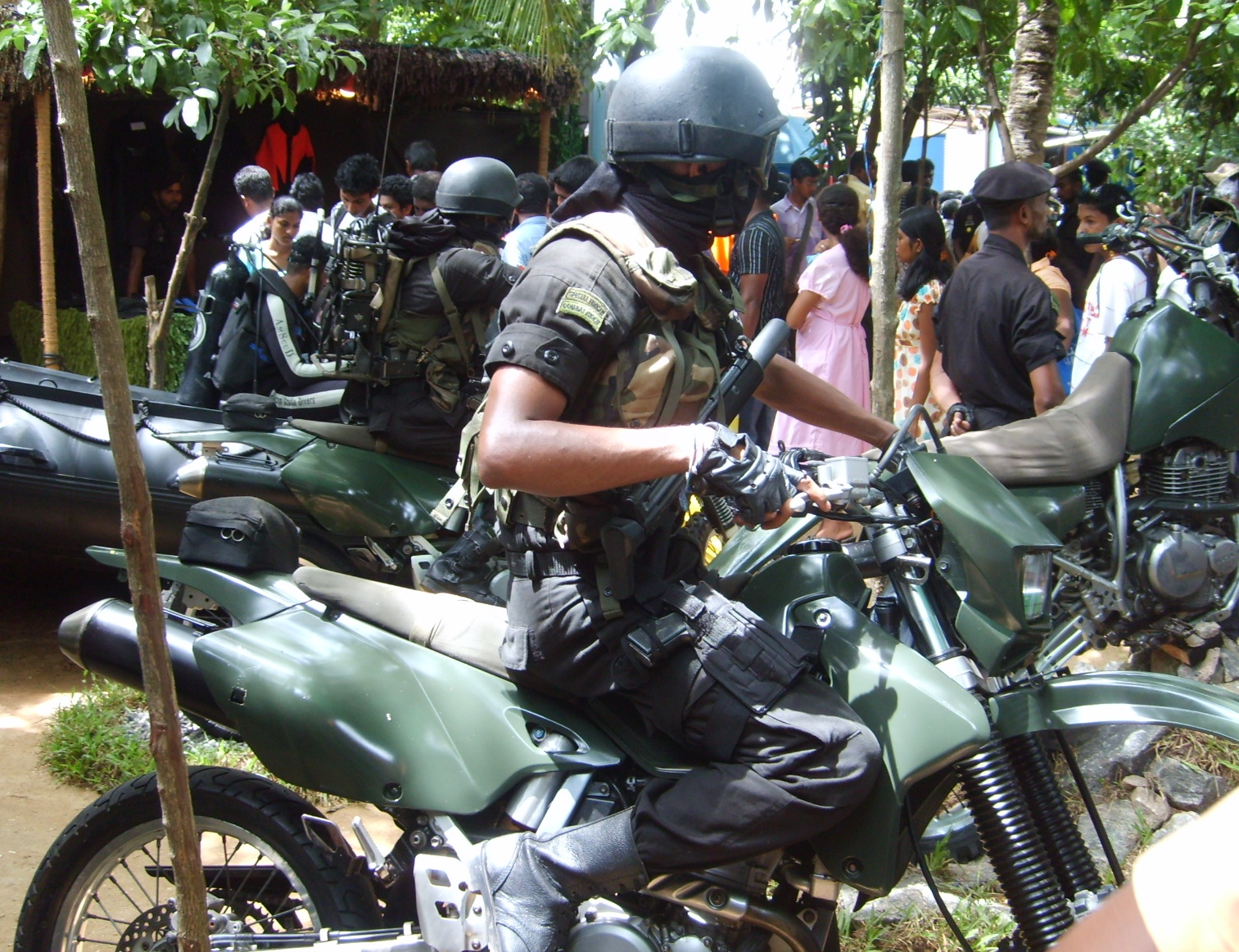
Special Force Combat Rider.

- Special Forces Brigade (SF BDE)
  - 1st Special Forces Regiment (1 SF) - specialists in high mobility direct action
    - C Squadron
    - F Squadron
    - G Squadron
    - J Squadron
    - Combat Rider Squadron
    - Support Squadron
    - Administrative Squadron
  - 2nd Special Forces Regiment (2 SF) - specialists in amphibious, small boat and underwater demolition.
    - B Squadron
    - D Squadron
    - E Squadron
    - H Squadron
    - Combat Diving Squadron
    - Support Squadron
    - Administrative Squadron
  - 3rd Special Forces Regiment (3 SF) - specialists in long range reconnaissance (LRP)
    - M Squadron
    - I Squadron
    - Support Squadron
    - Administrative Squadron
  - 4th Special Forces Regiment (4 SF) - specialists in counter terrorism and urban warfare
    - A Squadron
    - K Squadron
    - L Squadron
    - S Squadron
    - Urban Fighting Squadron - formed on 16 April 2012
    - Support Squadron
    - Administrative Squadron
  - 5th Special Forces Regiment (5 SF) - formed in 2009 and disbanded on 1 April 2012.

== Recruitment and training ==
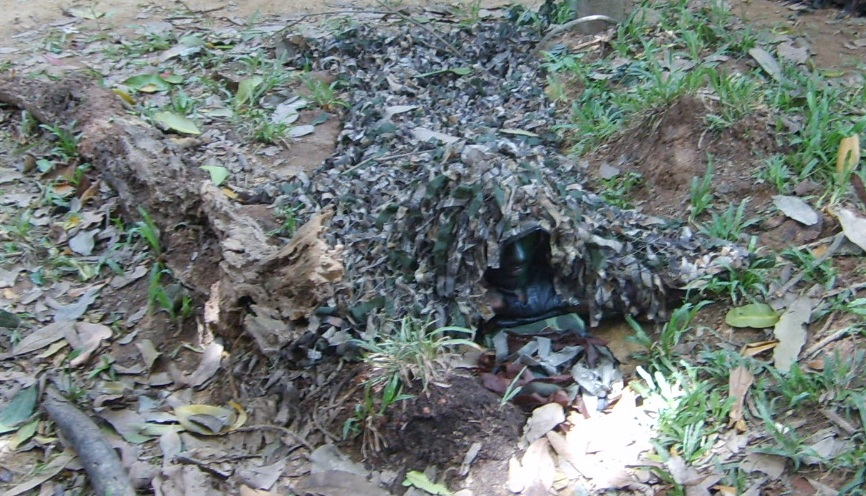
Soldier of the Sri Lanka Army Special Forces Regiment demonstrating the use of a Ghillie suit for camouflage

Any member of the Sri Lanka Army can apply for the Special Forces Regiment. Applicants need to pass the 28 day selection course. Candidates who successfully complete this course are then enrolled to complete the basic Special Forces course which lasts between 10–12 months. After graduating the Special Forces course, the candidates are inducted as members of the Special Forces Regiment and are offered training programs of occupational specialities offered by the Regiment.

=== Training Schools ===
Special Forces Training School was established on 15 February 1992 and it is conducting the basic and specialized training for all Special Forces personnel. It also conducts special courses to train instructors from other battalions in the Army and has also helped to train Navy Special Boat Squadron personnel and Sri Lanka Air Force Regiment Special Force.

- Special Forces Training School - SFTS
- Special Forces Combat Diving Training School - SFCDTS
- Special Forces Jungle Warfare Training School - SFJWTS

== Colors and insignia ==
=== Rana Parashuwa ===
Unlike other regiments in the Sri Lanka Army, the Special Forces Regiment has been awarded Rana Parashuwa which are a ceremonial battle hatchets that represent President's and regimental colors in 2019.

=== Insignia ===
The Special Forces Regiment cap badge depicts an Eagle and has been regarded as a symbol of the SF along with the black-colored beret and the Jolly Roger skull-and-crossed-bones arm patch with the "Special Forces" shoulder tab.

== Parama Weera Vibhushanaya recipient ==
- Colonel A.F. Lafir, PWV, RWP, RSP † – Former Commanding Officer of the 1st Regiment Special Forces
- Lieutenant Colonel J.A.L Jayasinghe, PWV, WWV, RWP, RSP † – Former Officer Commanding of M Sqn, 3rd Regiment Special Forces.
- Major Ajith Gamage, PWV, RWP, RSP † – Former Officer Commanding of C Sqn
- Sergeant Sugath Chandrasiri Bandara, PWV † - 2nd Special Forces Regiment
- Corporal K. Chandana, PWV † - 3rd Special Forces Regiment

== Notable members ==
- Major General Gamini Hettiarachchi - Father of the Special Forces Regiment
- General Mahesh Senanayake - former Commander Of the Army and Special Forces Brigade Commander
- Major General Prasanna De Silva - Former Special Forces Brigade Commander
- Colonel Raj Vijayasiri, RWP, RSP - Founder of the Long Range Reconnaissance Patrol (LRRP) Concept for Special Forces and former Special Forces Brigade Commander
- Major General Nirmal Dharmaratne -Former Special Forces Brigade Commander
- Major General Harendra Ranasinghe – Former Special Forces Brigade Commander
- Major General Sujeewa Senarathyapa – Special Forces Brigade Commander

== Order of precedence ==
Preceded by Commando Regiment	Order of Precedence	Succeeded by Military Intelligence Corps

== See also ==
- Long Range Reconnaissance Patrol (Sri Lanka)
- Commando Regiment
- List of military special forces units
