= Jayaweera Bandara =

Jayaweera Bandara may refer to:

- Jayavira Bandara, King of Kandy (r. 1511–1552)
- Jayaweera Bandara (cricketer) (born 1970), Sri Lankan cricketer
