= Hassalaka =

Coordinates: 7°21′N 80°57′E

Hasalaka
- town
- Interactive map of Hasalaka
- Country: Sri Lanka
- Province: Central Province
- District: Kandy District
- Time zone: UTC+5:30 (Sri Lanka Standard Time)
- Postal code: 20960

Hasalaka is a small town in Sri Lanka. It is located within Central Province.

This is the hometown Corporal Gamini Kularatne, Parama Weera Vibhushanaya recipient of Sri Lanka Army.

== See also ==
- List of towns in Central Province, Sri Lanka
