= President's Truncheon =

The President's Truncheon is a ceremonial staff carried by the Sri Lanka Sinha Regiment that serves as the equivalent of and is carried as the Presidential colours having been modeled after the Queen's Truncheon. The President's Truncheon is carried along with the Regimental Truncheon which is the equivalent of Regimental colours.

== See also ==
- Rana Parashuwa
