= G. S. Jayanath =

Major in Sri Lanka Army

Major Ginimalage Samantha Jayanath † PWV
- ගිණිමැලගේ සාමන්ත ජයනාත්
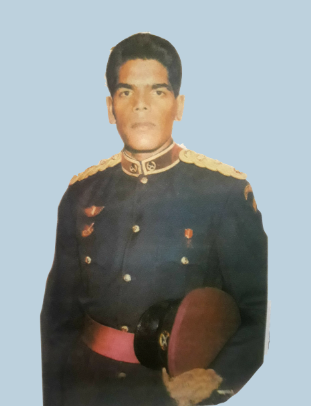
- Born: January 21, 1971
- Died: December 4, 1997 (aged 26); Maankulam, Sri Lanka
- Military career
- Allegiance: Sri Lanka
- Branch: Sri Lanka Army
- Service years: 1989 – 1997
- Rank: Major
- Service number: (O/61736)
- Unit: Commando Regiment
- Conflicts: Operation Jayasikurui
- Awards: Parama Weera Vibhushanaya

Major Ginimalage Samantha Jayanath PWV, CR (Sinhala: ගිණිමැලගේ සාමන්ත ජයනාත්), was a major in the Sri Lanka Army and a member of the army's elite Commando Regiment. He posthumously received the Parama Weera Vibhushanaya, the country's highest military award for gallantry, for his actions during Operation Jayasikurui in the Sri Lankan Civil War.

== Action during Operation Jayasikurui ==
In May 1997, the Sri Lankan government forces launched an offensive named Operation Jayasikurui against the Liberation Tigers of Tamil Eelam (commonly known as LTTE or Tamil Tigers). This operation was intended to regain the main supply route to the isolated Jaffna Peninsula by linking up the towns of Kilinochchi and Vavuniya.

By December 1997, the offensive had reached Maankulam. At the time, Jayanath was a captain in the 2nd Commando Regiment attached to the army's elite 53 Division. On 4 December, he led a squadron of commandos to destroy an identified artillery position in Tamil Tiger-held Maankulam. However, upon arriving at their target, they discovered that the artillery position was a decoy, and immediately came under direct and artillery fire from Tamil Tiger units who had been waiting in ambush. Jayanath pressed forward with a small group, attempting to draw their fire and allow the rest of his men to escape. The group was soon pinned down and Jayanath ordered a defensive perimeter and radioed for reinforcements, expressing confidence that his group could hold out until they arrived.

However, the reinforcements met with heavy resistance and failed to reach the group, and Jayanath was ordered to attempt to break through the Tamil Tiger positions. By this time, his group had taken heavy casualties from the constant artillery fire and repeated assaults on their positions. Attempting to break out in that situation would have meant leaving behind the wounded, and Jayanath refused the order. He informed his commanding officer that he would not leave as long as even one of his men were alive, and that they would hold out against the enemy assaults as long as possible and would not surrender. Jayanath kept fighting until he was shot in the head and killed, and the group was almost completely destroyed when their positions were eventually overrun. The mission ended in disaster for the army with approximately 180 men killed.

== Parama Weera Vibhushanaya ==
Jayanath was posthumously promoted to the rank of Major and recommended for the Parama Weera Vibhushanaya, Sri Lanka's highest military award for gallantry, for his actions during the mission to assault artillery positions during Operation Jayasikurui. The award was approved over a year later in 2001. Chandrika Kumaratunga, the then President of Sri Lanka, awarded the medal to his next-of-kin on 24 April 2001.

To date, Jayanath is one of five Commandos who has received the Parama Weera Vibhushanaya. Along with Colonel Fazly Lafir who was posthumously awarded the medal at the same time, Jayanath was one of the first members of a special operations unit and also one of the first army officers to receive the award.
