= A. F. Lafir =

Sri Lankan Army officer

Colonel Aslam Fazly Laphir † PWV, RWP, RSP
- Born: 26 December 1958; Kandy, Sri Lanka
- Died: 19 July 1996 (aged 37); Mullaitivu, Sri Lanka
- Military career
- Allegiance: Sri Lanka
- Branch: Sri Lanka Army
- Rank: Colonel
- Service number: (O/50981)
- Unit: Special Forces Regiment
- Commands: 1st Special Forces Regiment
- Conflicts: Sri Lankan civil war
- Awards: Parama Weera Vibhushanaya; Rana Wickrama Padakkama; Rana Sura Padakkama

Colonel Aslam Fazly Laphir, PWV, RWP, RSP, SF (last name also spelled Laffeer;26 December 1958 – 19 July 1996) was a Sri Lankan Army officer and posthumous recipient of the Parama Weera Vibhushanaya (PWV). He was awarded the PWV for his actions while leading the 1st Special Forces Regiment during the Battle of Mullaitivu in which he was killed. Colonel Laphir played a major role in the formation and development of the Special Forces Regiment from the original Combat Tracker Team.

== Early life ==
Laphir was born in Madawala, Kandy to a Muslim family. He was the eldest son of seven children born to Dr Mohammad Laphir and Siththi Hanul. He was educated at St. Anthony's College, Kandy where he was an all-round student, playing cricket and taking part in scouting. Having passed his advanced level examination in the math stream, the family wanted to send him to Libya to study engineering.

== Military career ==
Laphir instead opted to join the Sri Lanka Army and was selected as a cadet officer of the cadet intake no 14 (long course) of the Army Training Center in Diyatalawa on 11 August 1980. The course officer for intake no 14 was Captain Gamini Hettiarachchi. Graduating from the Sri Lanka Military Academy second in order of merit in his batch, he was commissioned as a Second Lieutenant on 27 February 1982 into the 1st Rajarata Rifles. As a young subaltern, he requested to join the Commando Regiment which was turned down by his commanding officer. Following the amalgamation of the Rajarata Rifles with the Vijayabahu Infantry Regiment to create the Gajaba Regiment, he was transferred to the A company, 1st Battalion under the command of Lieutenant Colonel Vijaya Wimalaratne. With the Gajaba Regiment, Lieutenant Laphir served in the North and Eastern provinces as the Sri Lankan Civil War escalated. He was thereafter transferred to the newly formed 3rd Battalion as officer commanding B company. During this time, he was attached to the military intelligence unit functioning under the Security Forces Headquarters – Jaffna due to his proficiency in the Tamil language. When this unit was absorbed into the newly formed National Intelligence Bureau, Lieutenant Laphir was transferred to it. He was invited by Major Gamini Hettiarachchi to join the newly formed Rapid Deployment Force (RDF) – Special Forces in 1985 which became the forerunner to elite Special Forces Regiment. Lieutenant Laphir led the B "Bravo" Squadron of the RDF and played a major role in the development of the Special Forces operations in the early days developing it into a formidable Special Forces unit, which specialized in rapid deployment operations, counterinsurgency and counter-terrorism warfare, reconnaissance and battlespace preparation in the medium and deep battle-space and jungle warfare. He took part in the Vadamarachchi Operation with the RDF. Promoted to Captain and then Major he remained in command of the B "Bravo" Squadron taking part in major operations against the LTTE which included Operation Thrividha Balaya, Operation Sea Breeze and Operation Riviresa. He served as group commander, squadron commander, battalion second in command, chief instructor of the Special Forces Training School and then was appointed commanding officer of the 1st Special Forces Regiment (1 SF) on 8 February 1996.

== Battle of Mullaitivu ==
On 18 July 1996 the Sri Lanka Army base at Mullaitivu came under heavy attack by LTTE, following a rescue operation code-named Operation Thrivida Pahara was launched to relieve the besieged base by landing troops by both air and sea. The initial landings were carried out on the 19th by an all-volunteer force of 275 elite commandos from the 1st special forces regiment led by their commanding officer, Lieutenant Colonel Lafir, who were heli-dropped under heavy fire and made radio contact with the besieged troops. Personally leading the attack under heavy fire, Lafir was wounded by severe gunshot injuries, yet continued to lead his men until he was killed by shrapnel from a nearby explosion. His men recovered his body and transported it back in a SLAF helicopter that had landed the second batch of commandos. For his courageous action on that day, he was awarded the Parama Weera Vibhushanaya, the highest award for valour in Sri Lanka and promoted to the rank of colonel posthumously.

== Honors and decorations ==

	Parama Weera Vibhushanaya	Rana Wickrama Padakkama	
Rana Sura Padakkama	Desha Putra Sammanaya	Purna Bhumi Padakkama	
North and East Operations Medal	Vadamarachchi Operation Medal	Riviresa Campaign Services Medal	Sri Lanka Armed Services Long Service Medal

His badges include: the Special Forces Regiment Badge and Tab, the Special Forces Badge, and the Parachute Badge. The Colonel Fazly Laphir Memorial Auditorium of the Sri Lanka Military Academy was named after Laphir in 2014.

== Family ==
He married Anoma Wickramasuriya, granddaughter of D. M. Rajapaksa in 1992. Her brothers are Lieutenant Colonel Prasanna Wickramasuriya and Jaliya Wickramasuriya. She is a first cousin of Mahinda Rajapaksa who served as President of Sri Lanka from 2005 to 2015 and of Lieutenant Colonel and also former President of Sri Lanka Gotabaya Rajapaksa

== See also ==
- Awards and decorations of the military of Sri Lanka
