= Throxenby =

Suburb of Scarborough, North Yorkshire, England

Coordinates: 54.285°N 0.442°W

- Suburb
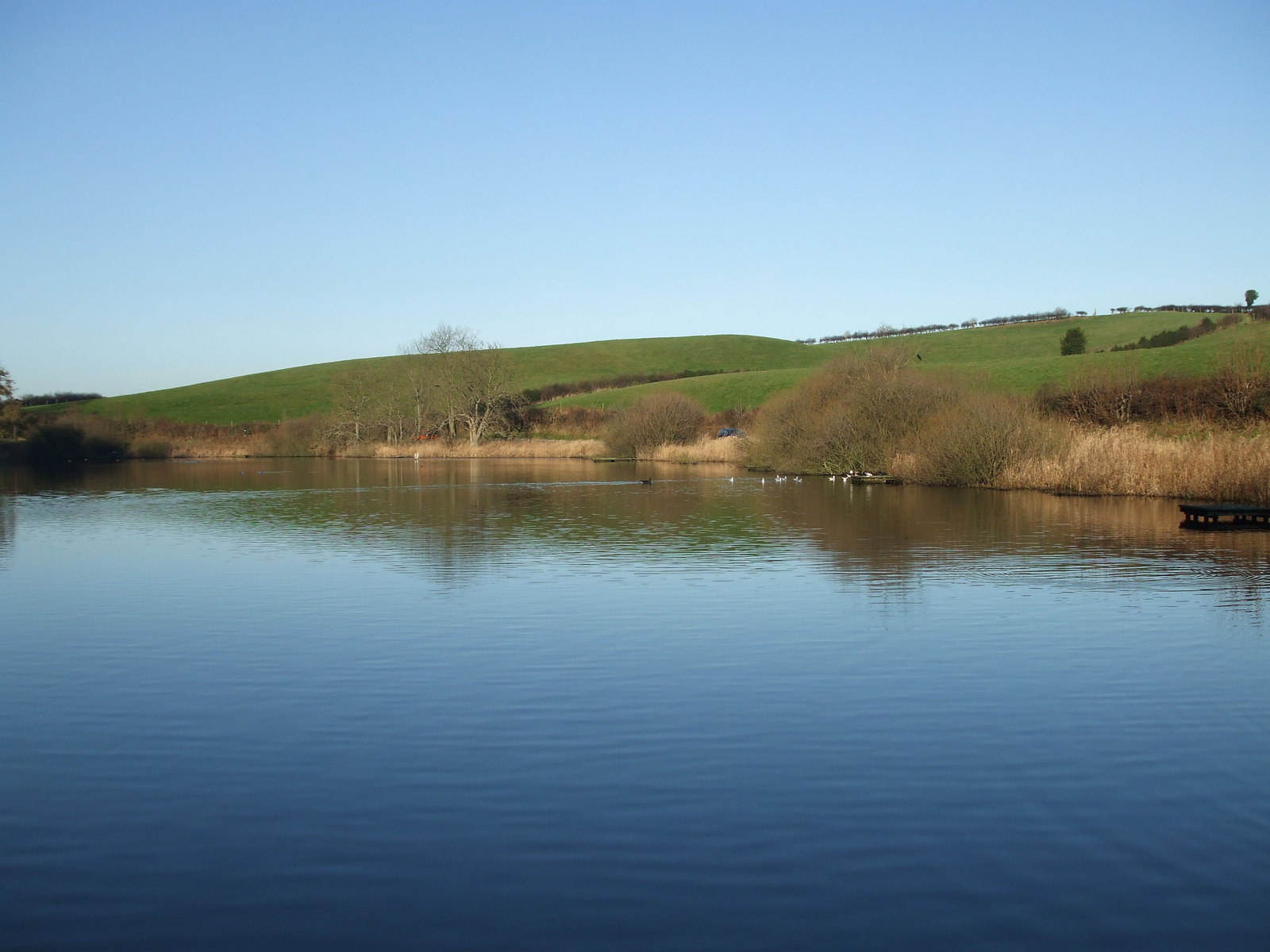
- Throxenby Mere

- Location within North Yorkshire
- OS grid reference: TA 014890
- Civil parish: Newby and Scalby
- Unitary authority: North Yorkshire
- Ceremonial county: North Yorkshire
- Region: Yorkshire and the Humber
- Country: England
- Sovereign state: United Kingdom
- Post town: SCARBOROUGH
- Postcode district: YO12
- Police: North Yorkshire
- Fire: North Yorkshire
- Ambulance: Yorkshire
- UK Parliament: Scarborough and Whitby Constituency

Throxenby is a suburb of Scarborough, in North Yorkshire, England. Historically the settlement of Throxenby was a hamlet, separated from Scarborough by countryside.

== History ==
Throxenby is not mentioned in the Domesday Book, and is first recorded as T'Stanebi in 1167. The name derives from a personal name and means Thorstan's Farm. Throxenby was a township covering a large area in 1859, (some 400 acres (160 ha)), but was also listed as a hamlet 2 miles (3.2 km) north-west of Scarborough. Post the Conquest, the land that formed the eventual Scalby Parish belonged to the crown, but was donated by Henry III to his son Edmund in 1257. However, in 1276, William de Morers gave his land at Throxenby and the manor to Henry de Percy.

Lady Edith's Drive was built to connect the main road at Scalby with Throxenby Mere by the 1st Earl of Londesborough, who named it after his wife. Whilst the Londesborough family were the principal landowners in the area, the lord or lady of the manor is given to those who hold the title of the Duchy of Lancaster, which is the ruling monarch of the time as the estates belong to the crown. It has been suggested by archaeological surveys that the settlement in medieval times never had an official manor house or church, and that it was populated by tenant farmers, with houses strung out along Throxenby Lane. However, in 1660, Christopher Keld of Newby built a manorial house, which was again replaced. and became known as Throxenby Hall.

c. 1831–1832, a military barracks was built in the township, around the same time that Burniston Barracks were built. In 1946, North Riding County Council (later North Yorkshire County Council from 1974), acquired Throxenby Hall and turned it into a home for boys from across the county. The home was closed in 1991, and was later converted into flats.

In 2004, a new St Catherine's Hospice as opened in Throxenby, having previously being located on Scalby Road.

Within the area formerly covered by Throxenby parish, is the deserted Medieval village of Hatterboard (at TA017887).

== Governance ==
Historically, Throxenby and the surrounding area was part of the wapentake of Pickering Lythe.

Population of Throxenby parish 1801–1901
1801	1811	1821	1831	1841	1851	1861	1871	1881	1890	1891	1901
48	58	66	54	71	57	45	130	128	202	225	253

In 1831, Throxenby was a township in parish of Scalby, in 1866 Throxenby became a separate civil parish, in 1894, it was partnered with Newby in that civil parish. In 1901 the parish had a population of 253. On 1 April 1909, the parish of Newby was subsumed into the neighbouring Scalby civil parish. It is now in the Newby and Scalby civil parish, and is represented at Westminster as part of the Scarborough and Whitby Constituency.

== Throxenby Mere ==
Throxenby Mere is a body of water to the west of the village immediately below Raincliff Woods and Irton Moor. Early maps do not show a body of water, though the ground being a natural hollow, it is thought to have been quite marshy and prone to flooding. The mere was dammed in the 19th century, and the outflow now runs along the southern edge of Lady Edith's Drive in the area. The mere is designated as a mesotrophic lake, and covers an area of 4.3 acres (1.76 ha). Wildlife observed on the mere includes mallards, tufted ducks and smews.
