= Roy Douglas Jayetileke =

Sri Lankan military leader

Roy Douglas Jayetileke MBE
- Born: Ceylon (now Sri Lanka)
- Military career
- Allegiance: Sri Lanka
- Branch: Ceylon Army
- Service years: 1942–1964
- Rank: Brigadier
- Units: Ceylon Light Infantry, Sri Lanka Sinha Regiment
- Commands: Army Recruit Training Depot; Sri Lanka Sinha Regiment
- Conflicts: World War II
- Awards: Member of the Order of the British Empire (MBE)

Brigadier Roy Douglas Jayetileke, MBE was a Sri Lankan military leader. He served as the first Commandant of the Army Recruit Training Depot and founding commanding officer of the Sri Lanka Sinha Regiment.

Jayetileke received a wartime commission as a second lieutenant in the Ceylon Light Infantry in 1942 with the onset of World War II in the Far East. After the war, Jayetileke joined the Ceylon Army at its formation in 1949 with the rank of captain in the 1 Battalion, Ceylon Light Infantry. Major Jayetileke became the first Officer Commanding, Army Recruit Training Depot in February 1950 when it was established at the Ceylon Volunteer Force Camp in Diyatalawa. On 1 October 1956, Lieutenant Colonel Jayetileke was appointed the first commanding officer of the Ceylon Sinha Regiment at Imperial camp at Diyatalawa. Establishing the Sinha Regiment, Jayetileke served as its commanding officer till March 1964 having been promoted to the rank of colonel. He retired from the army with the rank of brigadier. He was appointed a Member of the Order of the British Empire in the 1953 New Year Honours.
