= Pasan Gunasekera =

Sri Lankan Army non-commissioned officer

Warrant Officer Class 2 Pasan Gunasekera † PWV, WWV, RSP, GR
- Warrant Officer 2nd Class H.B.P. Gunasekera
- Born: 9 November 1964; Millewa, Sri Lanka
- Died: 29 November 1995 (aged 31); Jaffna, Sri Lanka
- Military career
- Allegiance: Sri Lanka
- Branch: Sri Lanka Army
- Service years: 1985–1995
- Rank: Warrant Officer Class 2
- Service number: (S/77304)
- Unit: Gajaba Regiment
- Conflicts: Sri Lankan civil war
- Awards: Parama Weera Vibhushanaya; Weera Wickrama Vibhushanaya; Rana Wickrama Padakkama; Rana Sura Padakkama

Warrant Officer Class 2 H.B. Pasan Gunasekera (පසන් ගුණසේකර) PWV, WWV, RWP, RSP, GR (November 9, 1964 – November 29, 1995) was a non-commissioned officer in the Sri Lanka Army who was posthumously promoted to the rank of Warrant Officer Class 2 from Staff Sergeant, and awarded the Parama Weera Vibhushanaya (PWV) medal, Sri Lanka's highest military decoration, for his heroic deeds in Jaffna, Sri Lanka during Operation Riviresa.

== Early life ==
Pasan Gunasekera was born at Millewa, and was the youngest son of his family. After his father died in 1981, Gunasekera had worked for a while at a local Ayurveda medicine factory. He met a retired Army officer working there and became very keen to join the Sri Lankan Army.

== Military service ==
He joined the army in 1985 and served mostly in the North. He had fought in several major operations such as Vadamarachchi, Haye Para, Balavegaya 1 and 2 and Wanni Wickremaya 1,2,3. Even he had been shot in the stomach at Vavuniya earlier and at that stage, his commanding officer had tried to transfer him to Colombo but Gunasekera requested to get back to Jaffna.

In 1995, while he was on leave, he was urgently recalled to Jaffna. He had been ready to go on a course abroad but that too was cancelled because he was needed in Jaffna for the fore coming Operation Riviresa, which was his fate resolved.

== Citation ==
November 29, 1995 the Sri Lankan forces was on the edge of capturing Jaffna Town in Operation Riviresa. At this stage the LTTE were fighting a fierce battle in the town and they were supported by the Sea Tigers who were using boats to bring in supplies and to evacuate casualties. The Sea Tigers did this under the cover of darkness from 1800 hrs to 0500 hrs. On some days about 200-300 boats were involved in this operation. It facilitated the LTTE in resisting the main operational force which was attempting to capture Jaffna Town.

The movement of these boats were covered by a group of terrorists who were stationed in Chiruthivu Island which was between Jaffna Town and Mandathivu Island where 10th Gajaba Regiment troops were located. It was therefore necessary to evict the terrorists from Chiruthivu if the army were to stop this boat movement. Gunasekara volunteered to take part in this mission, and with the help of improvised rafts he entered the Chiruthivu Island at about 0200 hrs with 16 men and occupied the Island after evicting the terrorists. Having done this he established a fire base to engage the terrorist boats moving in the Lagoon. By about 2100 hrs on November 30, 1995 he was able to immobilize a large number of terrorist boats moving in the lagoon.

Gunasekara died due to terrorist gunfire during this operation. He volunteered for the task with a small group of men unmindful of the danger to his life against the greater terrorist force who were moving in boats in strength armed to the teeth. This facilitated the isolation of terrorist fighting in the Jaffna Town and eventually helped the army to capture it.
