= K. W. T. Nissanka =

Sri Lankan army officer

Second Lieutenant K. W. T. Nissanka † PWV
- Born: 21 October 1971
- Died: 11 November 1993 (aged 22); Pooneryn, Sri Lanka
- Military career
- Allegiance: Sri Lanka
- Branch: Sri Lanka Army
- Service years: 1990–1993
- Rank: Second Lieutenant
- Service number: O/61672
- Unit: Gajaba Regiment
- Conflicts: Sri Lankan civil war
- Awards: Parama Weera Vibhushanaya

Second Lieutenant K. W. T. Nissanka PWV, GR was a Sri Lankan army officer who was the platoon commander of his platoon. He fought with courage in the face of an enemy attack, sacrificing his life to enable his troops to withdraw with their injured. He was awarded the Parama Weera Vibhushanaya, the highest award for valour of the Sri Lanka Army.

== Early life ==
K. W. T. Nissanka who was born in Colombo to KW Karunarathne and KP Dayawathi as the second child to the family after his elder sister Indrani Wickramarachchi. He attended D.S. Senanayake College and joined the army as a cadet officer soon after leaving school in 1990. After completing his training at the Sri Lanka Military Academy, he was commissioned as a Second Lieutenant in the 3rd Battalion, Gajaba Regiment.

== The battle of Pooneryn ==
In November 1993 2nd Lt Nissanka and his platoon was assigned to the Pooneryn Camp and deployed facing Pooneryn just outside the town. Due to pooneryn being a strategic stronghold it was under constant attack by the LTTE. On November 11, 1993, at about 1.30 a.m., the LTTE unleashed a sudden and major offensive on the Pooneryn Camp in order to capture it. The brunt of this attack fell on the lines 2nd Lt. Nissanka's platoon was defending. The first wave was successfully repulsed by the 2nd Lt. Nissanka and his platoon. A second more powerful attack soon followed which came from both the front and the rear of the line. During this time 2nd Lt Nissanka moved from bunker to bunker, encouraging his men, paying no heed to the risk to his own life. He called for reinforcements from the battalion headquarters, but reinforcements couldn’t be sent as the headquarters itself was under attack. By around 5 a.m. 2nd Lt Nissanka was wounded badly, yet even in great pain he continued to command his men. Then with the enemy advancing towards his position, 2nd Lt Nissanka ordered the surviving members of his platoon to withdraw with their wounded. After giving the order he removed the pins on two grenades and ran towards the enemy, the grenades exploded killing him and the attacking terrorists instantly. This gallant action allowed the remainder of his platoon to withdraw to safety with their wounded.

For this heroic deed 2nd Lt Nissanka was posthumously honoured with the Parama Weera Vibhushanaya medal in 1996.

== Citation ==
"It is recommended that 0/61672 2/Lt KWT Nissanka of the Gajaba Regiment, be awarded the Parama Weera Vibushanaya as a reward for his individual acts of gallantry and conspicuous bravery of the most exceptional order in the face of the enemy, performed voluntarily whilst on active service and with no regard to the risks to his own life and security with the objective of safeguarding thereby, the lives of his comrades or facilitating the operational aim of his force,"

== See also ==
- Awards and decorations of the military of Sri Lanka
