= A. M. B. H. G. Abeyrathnebanda =

Sri Lankan Army soldier

Lance Corporal A. M. B. H. G. Abeyrathnebanda † PWV
- A. M. B. H. G. අබේරත්න බණ්ඩා
- Born: c. 1989; Sri Lanka
- Died: 29 January 2009 (aged 19); Visuamadu, Sri Lanka
- Cause of death: Explosion
- Military career
- Allegiance: Sri Lanka
- Branch: Sri Lanka Army
- Service years: 2009
- Rank: Lance Corporal
- Service number: S/198852
- Unit: Sri Lanka Sinha Regiment
- Conflicts: 2008–2009 Sri Lankan Army Northern offensive
- Awards: Parama Weera Vibhushanaya

Lance Corporal Abeykoon Musiyanselage Birahene Gedara Abeyrathnebanda (also spelled Abeyrathne Banda, Sinhala: A. M. B. H. G. අබේරත්නබණ්ඩා, c. 1989 — 29 January 2009) was a soldier in the Sri Lanka Army. He was killed in action during a battle against the Liberation Tigers of Tamil Eelam during the final stages of the Sri Lankan Civil War. He was posthumously awarded the Parama Weera Vibhushanaya, the country's highest military award for gallantry, and is the youngest recipient of the medal, at just 19 years old.

== Military career ==
After finishing basic military training, Abeyrathnebanda was assigned to the 21st battalion of the Sri Lanka Sinha Regiment. The 21st Sinha Regiment was part of the 584 Brigade of the 58 Division. He joined the unit on 1 January 2009. His citation and army records identify him as a recruit.

=== Action on 29 January 2009 ===
Mullaitivu, the main military and administrative base of the Tamil Tigers, fell to the army on 25 January 2009. The Tamil Tigers were then surrounded in the Puthukkudiyiruppu and Visuamadu areas. The 58 Division was advancing towards Visuamadu along the A35 highway, and the task of attacking Visuamadu from the west was given to the 21st Sinha Regiment.

The army launched their attack on the dawn of 29 January. A skirmish party was sent to capture a section of the Tamil Tiger defensive line in order to allow the rest of the regiment to launch the main offensive. Abeyrathnebanda was part of an eight-man team in this group. They reached the defensive line undetected under the cover of darkness, and assaulted a heavily fortified bunker, which was their assigned target. The resistance was heavy, and although they managed to capture the bunker, Abeyrathnebanda was injured in the process due to gunfire.

However, they soon came under attack from positions in the Tamil Tigers' secondary defensive lines. As his team were pinned down and taking casualties, Abeyrathnebanda realised that their position would soon be overrun. At once, he jumped out of the captured bunker and ran to the adjacent bunker along the connecting trench. Rushing amongst the attacking Tamil Tigers, he detonated a hand grenade, killing them and himself. This caused the Tamil Tigers' attack to be delayed long enough for the main force of the 21st Sinha Regiment to arrive and reinforce the skirmish party.

The battle ended in victory for the army. They captured the town of Visuamadu, as well as a number of military hardware from the Tamil Tigers.

== Recognition ==
Abeyrathnebanda was posthumously promoted to the rank of Lance Corporal. Three years later, he was approved to receive the Parama Weera Vibhushanaya, Sri Lanka's highest military award for gallantry. President Mahinda Rajapaksa awarded Abeyrathnebanda's medal to his next-of-kin on 19 May 2012, which was the third anniversary of the end of the war. The citation for his medal commends him for fighting with "courage and valour... disregarding risk to his own life and security" despite sustaining injuries, and for sacrificing his life for the sake of his comrades and country. He was 19 years old at the time of his death, and is the youngest recipient of the Parama Weera Vibhushanaya.
