= Rana Parashuwa =

The President's Rana Parashuwa and the Regimental Rana Parashuwa are ceremonial hatchets carried by the Special Forces Regiment that serves as the equivalent of and is carried as the colours.

== See also ==
- President's Truncheon
