= K. Chandana =

Sri Lanka Army soldier

Corporal K. Chandana † PWV
- K. චන්දන
- Born: 22 February 1980; Morayaya, Weeraketiya, Hambantota
- Died: 25 July 2008 (aged 28); Maankulam, Mullaitivu District
- Military career
- Allegiance: Sri Lanka
- Branch: Sri Lanka Army
- Service years: 2002 – 2008
- Rank: Corporal
- Service number: S/467722
- Unit: Special Forces
- Awards: Parama Weera Vibhushanaya

Corporal K. Chandana, PWV (Sinhala: K. චන්දන, died June 2008) was a soldier in the Sri Lanka Army. He was part of a Long Range Reconnaissance Patrol from the army's elite Special Forces Regiment, which infiltrated deep behind territory held by the Liberation Tigers of Tamil Eelam (commonly known as LTTE or Tamil Tigers) in June 2008. He was killed in a firefight during this operation and was posthumously awarded the Parama Weera Vibhushanaya, the country's highest military award for gallantry, for his actions which enabled the rest of his team to withdraw to safety.

== Military service ==
Chandana joined the Sri Lanka Army on 20 August 2002 and successfully completed Recruit Course No. 43 at the Sri Lanka Infantry Training School. Subsequently, he successfully completed Special Forces Basic Training Course No. 31 and was inducted into the Special Forces.

== Action in June 2008 ==
A Lance Corporal attached to the army's 3rd Special Forces, Chandana was part of a six- or eight-man Long Range Reconnaissance Patrol (LRRP) team that infiltrated into Tamil Tiger-held territory in northern Sri Lanka in June 2008. (Note: The exact composition of the team and dates of the operation are unclear.) The team carried out a successful ambush on the A9 highway between Mankulam and Kilinochchi, approximately 30 kilometres (19 mi) to 40 kilometres (25 mi) deep inside enemy territory at the time, and killed two Tamil Tiger leaders.

Having completed their mission, the team was on their way back to the army lines when they were spotted by Tamil Tiger units while crossing the Mankulam–Thunukkai road. They came under heavy fire, which injured one of the soldiers in the team. Chandana and the team leader, a Sergeant named Jayakodi, provided covering fire while the rest of the team withdrew, carrying the injured soldier. However, Chandana was severely injured in the firefight and was left unable to move by himself. He insisted that his team leader withdraw with the rest of the team lest he also be captured or killed, and kept fighting by himself against the Tamil Tiger units which were converging on their position.

The team later returned to find Chandana, and found that he had been killed by a shot through his chest. However, they soon came under attack again and had to leave his body behind, and managed to reach the government-held area after several days.

== Recognition ==
Chandana was posthumously promoted to the rank of Corporal and recommended for the Parama Weera Vibhushanaya, Sri Lanka's highest military award for gallantry. The approval of his medal was announced in The Sri Lanka Gazette on 16 May 2012. It was presented to his next-of-kin on 19 May 2012 by President Mahinda Rajapaksa, at the celebrations marking the third anniversary of the end of the war. The citation for his Parama Weera Vibhushanaya states:

He voluntarily faced the enemy to receive firing bullets that were directed to destroy his comrades and sacrificed his life for protection of his own comrades and the beloved motherland. The entire nation is indebted to a war hero of this exceptional nature and his memory is thus immortalized.

Chandana's name is engraved on a memorial plaque at the Brigade Headquarters of the Special Forces in Vavuniya, along with the other recipients of the Parama Weera Vibhushanaya from the unit.
