= Listed buildings in Burniston =

Burniston is a civil parish in the county of North Yorkshire, England. It contains 14 listed buildings that are recorded in the National Heritage List for England. All the listed buildings are designated at Grade II, the lowest of the three grades, which is applied to "buildings of national importance and special interest". The parish contains the village of Burniston and the surrounding countryside, and the listed buildings consist of houses, cottages, farmhouses and farm buildings, and a bridge.

== Buildings ==
Name and location	Photograph	Date	Notes
32 High Street; 54.32292°N 0.44599°W	—	17th century	A house, at one time a post office, in sandstone, with a pantile roof and a coped gable and kneeler on the right. There are two storeys and two bays. The house contains two doorways, a shop window, sash windows, a fixed-light window, a blocked fire window, and a re-set datestone.
Barn and stable south of South End Farm Cottages; 54.32037°N 0.44265°W	—	17th century	The barn and stable are in sandstone with a cruck-framed core, and have a pantile roof and a coped gable with kneelers. There are three bays and lean-to cowsheds at the rear. The building contains doors, pitching openings and a cart entrance.
Cherry Tree Cottage; 54.32062°N 0.44245°W	—	1690	The cottage was extended in the early 19th century by the addition of a bay to the right. It is in sandstone and has a pantile roof, with coped gables and moulded kneelers on the right bay. The original part has a single storey and attics and four bays, and the added bay has two storeys. The windows in the original part are fixed, and in the right bay they are sashes with lintels and keystones.
Range north of South End Farm Cottages; 54.32056°N 0.44251°W	—	1690	The range is in sandstone with a pantile roof and a single storey. It contains a doorway and a two-light horizontally-sliding sash window.
Sykes Farmhouse; 54.32832°N 0.46147°W	—	Mid 18th century	A farmhouse and barn, later a private house, it is in sandstone, and has a pantile roof with stone coping and plain kneelers. There are two storeys and two bays. The doorway is in the centre, the windows are horizontally-siding sashes, and all the openings have plain lintels.
Overgreen Farmhouse and outbuildings 54.32360°N 0.44954°W	—	Mid to late 18th century	The house has been extended into a former dairy at the rear and a barn to the left, and there are attached former farm buildings to the rear. The buildings are in sandstone with quoins, and a pantile roof with coped gables and moulded kneelers. There is a single storey and attics, and three bays. The windows are horizontally-sliding sashes with lintels, one with a keystone. In the roof are three gabled dormers with pierced and scalloped bargeboards and finials.
Beck Farmhouse; 54.32299°N 0.44176°W	—	Late 18th century	A farmhouse and cottage later combined into a house, it is in sandstone and has a pantile roof with coped gables and moulded kneelers. There are two storeys and four bays. Steps lead up to the doorway in a gabled lattice porch, and the windows are sashes, those in the ground floor with lintels and keystones.
Cliff Top House; 54.32928°N 0.42564°W		Late 18th century	A farmhouse, later a private house, it is in sandstone and has a pantile roof with coped gables and moulded kneelers. There are two storeys and three bays, and a rear outshut. In the centre is a canopied porch, and the windows are sashes with lintels and keystones.
Low Farm; 54.32209°N 0.44443°W	—	Late 18th century	A stone farmhouse that has a pantile roof with coped gables and moulded kneelers. There are two storeys and three bays. The doorway has a lattice canopied porch, and the windows are sashes, some with lintels and keystones.
Prickybeck Bridge; 54.32249°N 0.44210°W	—	Late 18th century (probable)	The bridge carries Field Lane over Burniston Beck. It is in sandstone and consists of two semicircular arches. The bridge has a cutwater on the north side, voussoirs, a band with rounded ends, a parapet and a keystone.
Rose Cottage; 54.32327°N 0.44647°W	—	Late 18th century	The house is in sandstone, and has a pantile roof with coped gables and kneelers. There are two storeys and two bays, and a single-storey extension to the left. The doorway has a gabled lattice porch, there is one small casement window, and the other windows are horizontally-sliding sashes.
Barn House; 54.32093°N 0.44209°W	—	Early 19th century	A sandstone house that has a pantile roof with coped gables and moulded kneelers. There are two storeys and three bays. The central doorway has a rectangular fanlight, the windows are sashes, and all the openings have wedge lintels with keystones. In the roof are two later flat-roofed dormers.
Corner House; 54.32569°N 0.45104°W		Early 19th century	A farmhouse, later a private house, it is in sandstone, and has a pantile roof with coped gables and moulded kneelers. There are two storeys and attics, two bays, and a rear outshut. The central doorway has a plain surround, and the windows are sashes with wedge lintels and keystones. In the roof are two later gabled dormers with plain bargeboards.
Three Jolly Sailors; 54.32182°N 0.44407°W		Early 19th century	A farmhouse, later a public house, it is in sandstone and has a slate roof with coped gables and moulded kneelers. There are two storeys and four bays. The doorway is approached by steps, and the windows in the ground floor are two sashes with lintels and keystone, and a fire window and a casement window, both with plain lintels. In the upper floor are horizontally-sliding sashes.
