= Burniston =

Village and civil parish in North Yorkshire, England

Coordinates: 54.323300°N 0.447100°W

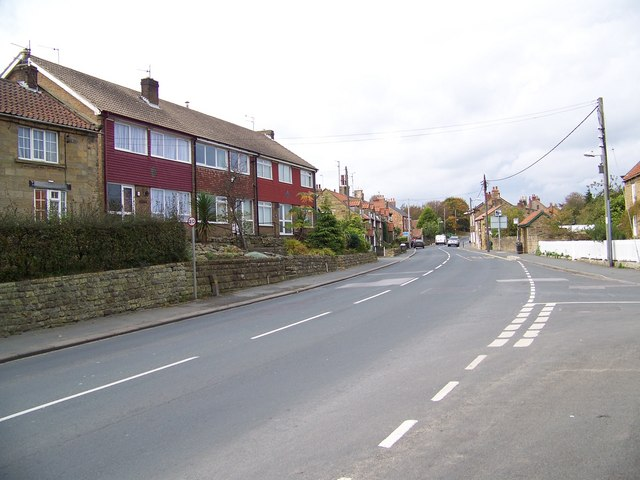
- High Street, Burniston

- Location within North Yorkshire
- Population: 1,523 (2011 census)
- OS grid reference: TA010930
- Civil parish: Burniston
- Unitary authority: North Yorkshire
- Ceremonial county: North Yorkshire
- Region: Yorkshire and the Humber
- Country: England
- Sovereign state: United Kingdom
- Post town: SCARBOROUGH
- Postcode district: YO13
- Police: North Yorkshire
- Fire: North Yorkshire
- Ambulance: Yorkshire
- UK Parliament: Scarborough and Whitby

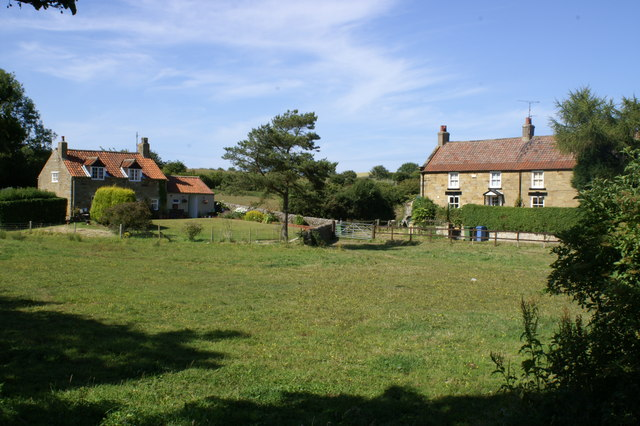
Beck Farm Cottages

Burniston is a village and civil parish in the county of North Yorkshire, England. It is situated about four miles north of Scarborough, on the A171 road. According to the 2011 UK census Burniston parish had a population of 1,523, an increase on the 2001 UK census figure of 1,389. With all the new houses at River Meadows, the population is now roughly 1,500. The parish council is Burniston Parish Council.

From 1974 to 2023 it was part of the Borough of Scarborough, it is now administered by the unitary North Yorkshire Council.

== History ==
The area is known for its prehistoric legacy. Dinosaur footprints have been found in the rocks at Burniston.

The village appears as Brennigston in Domesday Book. The name means "farmstead of a man named Brýningr" in Old Norse. The first church was built in 1235, and the first record of a pub was in 1782 when there were three alehouse keepers.

During the early hours of 14 February 1823 a smugglers dispute led to William Mead shooting James Law with a pistol from his bedroom window. Law and three associates had stopped beneath Meads window to sing taunting songs as Mead was informant and had caused Law many legal troubles. After being shot Law died a week later and Mead was charged with murder. At the trial he was found guilty of manslaughter and sentenced to 2 years in jail.

A permanent military presence was established in the village with the completion of Burniston Barracks in 1861.

Burniston has held an annual agricultural show since 1888.

In the mid-1990s, the 17th century blacksmith's forge, one of the oldest buildings in the village, was demolished for safety reasons. In 1995, the parish council celebrated its centenary by distributing mugs decorated with the village crest in gold and blue to village schoolchildren.

== Amenities ==
The village has two pubs, the Three Jolly Sailors and the Oak Wheel. It also has two garages - Burniston Motor Works and England's Garage. There are no petrol stations in the village. Burniston Village Hall and its land include a park and tennis courts. It has one guest house, Harmony Country Lodge, which has an octagonal design. There are two churches, the Methodist chapel in the High Street and Harmony Church and Healing Sanctuary at the top of Limestone Road, which is non-religious Christian. The Methodist chapel has recently undergone redevelopment to accommodate an increasing membership. The expansion included a more modern design which complements the retained old building.

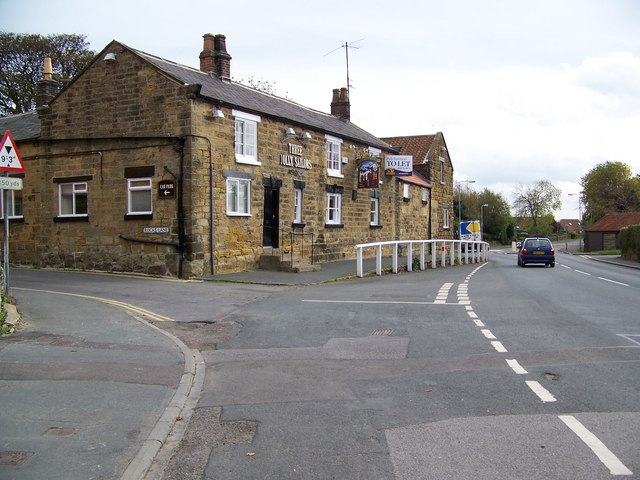
The Three Jolly Sailors Pub

The village school (Lindhead) attracts families from outside the area and is the centre of much community activity. The village hall in Burniston is shared with the adjoining area of Cloughton, and the two areas are linked in many ways. The annual pantomime is usually a sell-out, and the hall is used by many community groups. Generations of villagers help organise an important range of community activities.

More recently, the village has become a commuter area — being surrounded by greenery but near enough to town.

== See also ==
- Listed buildings in Burniston
