= Parama Weera Vibhushanaya =

- Medal, obverse (right) and reverse (left)
- Type: Medal
- Awarded for: "individual acts of gallantry and conspicuous bravery of the most exceptional order in the face of the enemy"
- Presented by: President of Sri Lanka
- Eligibility: Persons of any rank in the Sri Lankan regular or volunteer forces of the Army, Navy and Air Forces
- Post-nominals: PWV
- Status: Currently awarded
- Established: 1981
- First award: 1991
- Final award: 2016

Highlights
- Total: 32
- Total awarded posthumously: 32 (including awards to MIA personnel later declared KIA)
- Total recipients: 32
- Ribbon bar

Precedence
- Next (higher): None (Highest)
- Next (lower): Weerodara Vibhushanaya (Non-combat)
- Related: Uththama Pooja Pranama Padakkama

The Parama Weera Vibhushanaya (PWV) (Sinhala: පරම වීර වීභූෂණය parama vīra vibhūṣaṇaya; Tamil: பரம வீர விபுஷனைய) is Sri Lanka's highest military decoration, awarded for acts of exceptional valour in wartime. Parama Weera Vibhushanaya translates as the "Order of the Supreme Valour", and the award is granted for "individual acts of gallantry and conspicuous bravery of the most exceptional order in the face of the enemy". Corporal Gamini Kularatne, was the first recipient. As of January 2021, the medal has been awarded 32 times, of which all were posthumous and arose from actions in the Sri Lankan Civil War. Of the 32 awardees, 29 have been from the Sri Lanka Army, two have been from the Sri Lanka Navy and one has been from the Sri Lanka Air Force.

Ceylon used the British awards system and continued post-independence until 1956, when British imperial honours were suspended. New awards were instituted in 1981. PWV is equivalent to the Victoria Cross in the United Kingdom, the Medal of Honor in the United States and Param Vir Chakra in India.

== History ==
From its formation the Ceylon Defence Force used British military decorations. The practice was continued after Ceylon gained independence in 1948 and the formation of the Ceylon Army in 1949, the Royal Ceylon Navy in 1950, and the Royal Ceylon Air Force in 1951. Following up on his election promise, S. W. R. D. Bandaranaike suspended imperial honours. This meant only service medals such as the Ceylon Armed Services Long Service Medal, the Efficiency Decoration (Ceylon) and the Efficiency Medal (Ceylon) were awarded. No gallantry medals were award during the 1971 JVP Insurrection. In 1972, Ceylon became a republic as the Republic of Sri Lanka. On 1 September 1981, President J. R. Jayewardene instituted new Sri Lankan awards for gallantry the Parama Weera Vibhushanaya (PWV), Weerodara Vibhushanaya (WV), Weera Wickrama Vibhushanaya (WWV), Rana Wickrama Padakkama (RWV), and the Rana Sura Padakkama (RSP) by the Gazette Extraordinary No. 156/5 of 1982.

== Authority and privileges ==
As the highest award for valour in Sri Lanka, Parama Weera Vibhushanaya is always the first award to be presented at an awards ceremony by the President of Sri Lanka which includes the medal and a sanasa (award scroll). Recipients of the decoration can use the post-nominal letters "PWV" and it is always the first decoration worn in a row of medals and it is the first set of post-nominal letters used to indicate any decoration. Since all awards have been posthumous no tradition exists that require "all ranks to salute a bearer of the Parama Weera Vibhushanaya", nor does it provide for any annuity or monitory benefits for the recipient or next of kin other than statuary pension or WNOP pension as with other similar awards such as the Victoria Cross.

== Award process ==
The medal can be awarded to all ranks of the tri services, to both regular and volunteer forces, in recognition of:

...individual acts of gallantry and conspicuous bravery of a non-military nature of the most exceptional order performed voluntarily with no regard to his own life and security with the objective of saving or safeguarding the life or lives of a person or personnel imperiled by death or for a meritorious act or a series of acts of a humane nature of an exceptional order displayed in saving life from drowning, fire and rescue operations in mines, floods and similar calamities under circumstances of grave bodily injury or great danger to the life of the rescuer...

—

Field commanders report actions that fulfill the conditions for a PWV to their respective service commanders, who review these reports and, if satisfactory, forward an official recommendation to an awards board composed of officers from the three armed services branches for further review. The board's report is sent to the office of the President who, as commander in chief, has final authority on the award.

As of 2018, all recipients of this award were killed or missing in action- no living serviceperson has ever worn the medal or the ribbon bar, or used the post-nominal letters to date, effectively making the PWV an exclusively posthumous award.

== Recipients ==
Busts of recipients	Name	Rank^{**}	Unit	Date of action	Conflict	Place of action	Citations
	Saliya Aladeniya	Captain	Sri Lanka Sinha Regiment	11 June 1990	Battle of Kokavil	Kokavil, Northern Province, Sri Lanka	
	Gamini Kularatne	Corporal	Sri Lanka Sinha Regiment	14 July 1991	First Battle of Elephant Pass	Elephant Pass, Northern Province, Sri Lanka	
	K. W. T. Nissanka	Lieutenant	Gajaba Regiment	14 November 1993	Battle of Pooneryn	Pooneryn, Northern Province, Sri Lanka	
	Pasan Gunasekera	Warrant Officer II	Gajaba Regiment	29 November 1995	Operation Riviresa	Jaffna, Northern Province, Sri Lanka	
	Jude Lakmal Wijethunge	Lieutenant Commander	Sri Lanka Navy	30 March 1996	Defending a Navy transport from a Sea Tiger attack	Seas off Northern Province, Sri Lanka	
	W. I. M. Seneviratne	Lance Corporal	Sri Lanka Light Infantry	4 July 1996	Suicide bombing	Jaffna, Northern Province, Sri Lanka	
	A.F. Lafir	Colonel	Special Forces Regiment	19 July 1996	Battle of Mullaitivu (1996)	Mullaitivu, Northern Province, Sri Lanka	
	G. S. Jayanath	Major	Commando Regiment	4 December 1997	Operation Jayasikurui	Maankulam, Northern Province, Sri Lanka	
	Tyron Silvapulle	Wing Commander	Sri Lanka Air Force	17 December 1999	Sri Lankan Civil War	Seas off Thamilamadam, Elephant Pass, Northern Province, Sri Lanka	
	P.N. Suranga	Sergeant	Vijayabahu Infantry Regiment	14 August 2006	Battle of Jaffna (2006)	Muhamalai-Nagarkovil defense line, Northern Province, Sri Lanka	
	G. N. Punsiri	Captain	Gajaba Regiment	2 July 2007	2008–2009 Sri Lankan Army Northern offensive	Uvarakkulam, Northern Province, Sri Lanka	
	K. Chandana	Corporal	Special Forces Regiment	June 2008	LRRP action	Northeast of Mankulam, Northern Province, Sri Lanka	
	A. M. N. P. Abesinghe	Corporal	Sri Lanka Light Infantry Regiment	25 June 2008	2008–2009 Sri Lankan Army Northern offensive	Thunukkai, Northern Province, Sri Lanka	
	T. G. D. R. Dayananda	Lance-Corporal	Sri Lanka Light Infantry Regiment	16 September 2008	2008–2009 Sri Lankan Army Northern offensive	Kilinochchi-Akkarayankulam Road, Northern Province, Sri Lanka	
	K. G. Shantha	Chief Petty Officer	Sri Lanka Navy	1 November 2008	Battle against sea Tigers between Point Pedro and Nagar Kovil	Seas off Point Pedro, Northern Province, Sri Lanka	
	Lalith Jayasinghe	Lieutenant Colonel	Special Forces Regiment	26 November 2008	LRRP action	Oddusuddan, Northern Province, Sri Lanka	
	A. M. B. H. G. Abeyrathnebanda	Lance Corporal	Sri Lanka Sinha Regiment	29 January 2009	2008–2009 Sri Lankan Army Northern offensive	Visuamadu, Northern Province, Sri Lanka	
	H. A. Nilantha Kumar	Corporal	Commando Regiment	29 January 2009	2008–2009 Sri Lankan Army Northern offensive	Puthukuduiruppu, Northern Province, Sri Lanka	
	P. M. Nilantha Pushpa Kumara	Corporal	Gemunu Watch	1 February 2009	2008–2009 Sri Lankan Army Northern offensive	Vishvamadu, Northern Province, Sri Lanka	
	U. G. A. S. Samaranayake	Captain	Gemunu Watch	2 February 2009	2008–2009 Sri Lankan Army Northern offensive	PTK Junction, Northern Province, Sri Lanka	
	H. G. M. H. I. Megawarna	Captain	Gemunu Watch	2 February 2009	2008–2009 Sri Lankan Army Northern offensive	PTK Junction, Northern Province, Sri Lanka	
	Sugath Chandrasiri Bandara	Sergeant	Special Forces Regiment	3 February 2009	2008–2009 Sri Lankan Army Northern offensive	Puthukkudiyiruppu, Northern Province, Sri Lanka	
	K. G. D. Gunasekara	Sergeant	Commando Regiment	16 February 2009	2008–2009 Sri Lankan Army Northern offensive	Dara Point, Northern Province, Sri Lanka	
	K. A. Gamage	Major	Special Forces Regiment	20 April 2009	2008–2009 Sri Lankan Army Northern offensive	Ampalavanpokkanai, Northern Province, Sri Lanka	
	W. T. Jayatillake	Lieutenant	Gemunu Watch	20 April 2009	2008–2009 Sri Lankan Army Northern offensive	Iranamadu, Northern Province, Sri Lanka	
	K. G. N. Perera	Staff Sergeant	Commando Regiment	21 April 2009	2008–2009 Sri Lankan Army Northern offensive	Puthumatalan, Northern Province, Sri Lanka	
	S. P. M. L. Pushpama	Corporal	Commando Regiment	21 April 2009	2008–2009 Sri Lankan Army Northern offensive	Puthumatalan, Northern Province, Sri Lanka	
	W.M.I.S.B. Walisundara	Major	Gajaba Regiment		2008–2009 Sri Lankan Army Northern offensive		
	A.M. Anura	Sergeant	Sinha Regiment		2008–2009 Sri Lankan Army Northern offensive		
	K.G.M. Rajapaksha	Lance Corporal	Sinha Regiment		2008–2009 Sri Lankan Army Northern offensive		
	R. M. D. M. Rathnayake	Lance-Corporal	Sri Lanka Light Infantry Regiment	11 May 2009	2008–2009 Sri Lankan Army Northern offensive	Nandikadal Lagoon, Northern Province, Sri Lanka	
	H. G. S. Bandara	Staff Sergeant	Vijayabahu Infantry Regiment	17 May 2009	2008–2009 Sri Lankan Army Northern offensive	Nanthikadal, Northern Province, Sri Lanka	
