= Vindika Chandrasiri =

Sri Lankan cricketer (born 1988)

Vindika Chandrasiri (full name Hewa Kahakandage Don Vindika Nadeera Chandrasiri; born 28 January 1988) is a Sri Lankan cricketer. He is a left-handed batsman and right-arm medium-fast bowler who plays for Sri Lanka Navy Sports Club. He was born in Ragama.

Chandrasiri, who made his cricketing debut for Moors Sports Club Under-23s, made his List A debut for Sri Lanka Navy in the 2009–10 season, against Singha Sports Club. From the opening order, he scored a single run.
