= Ambepussa Army Camp =

Military base in Sri Lanka

- Ambepussa, Kegalle District, Sabaragamuwa Province

Site information
- Type: Military Base
- Controlled by: Sri Lanka Army

Site history
- In use: 1979 – present

Garrison information
- Garrison: Sri Lanka Sinha Regiment

Ambepussa Army Camp is a military base located in Ambepussa, the Sabaragamuwa Province, Kegalle District of Sri Lanka. It serves as the regimental headquarters of the Sinha Regiment of Sri Lanka Army.

== See also ==
- Sri Lanka Sinha Regiment
