= H. G. S. Bandara =

Staff Sergeant H. G. S. Bandara † PWV
- H. G. S. බණ්ඩාර
- Died: 17 May 2009; Nanthikadal, Sri Lanka
- Military career
- Allegiance: Sri Lanka
- Branch: Sri Lanka Army
- Service years: Unknown – 2009
- Rank: Staff Sergeant
- Service number: S/511904
- Unit: Vijayabahu Infantry Regiment
- Conflicts: 2008–2009 Sri Lankan Army Northern offensive
- Awards: Parama Weera Vibhushanaya

H. G. S. Bandara (Sinhala: H. G. S. බණ්ඩාර, died 17 May 2009) was a soldier in the Sri Lanka Army. He was killed in a battle against the Liberation Tigers of Tamil Eelam (commonly known as LTTE or Tamil Tigers), two days before the civil war ended. Three years later, he was posthumously awarded the Parama Weera Vibhushanaya, the country's highest military award for gallantry, for his actions during that battle.

== Action on 17 May 2009 ==
The battle took place in Nanthikadal, two days before the war ended.

By 16 May 2009, the Sri Lankan Civil War was nearing its end, with the government military assault having confined and surrounded the remnants of the Tamil Tigers to an area of approximately 4 square kilometres (1.5 sq mi) around the Nanthikadal lagoon in north-eastern Sri Lanka. The army expected the Tamil Tigers to attempt to break through their lines, and had stationed several small groups around the lagoon. One of these, an eight-man team stationed on a small islet in the lagoon, was led by Bandara. At the time, he was a sergeant attached to the 4th Vijayabahu Infantry Regiment.

The expected attack by the Tamil Tigers came on the dawn of 17 May. Bandara's team spotted a group of about 150 Tamil Tigers attempting to cross the lagoon. Although heavily outnumbered, they ambushed the advancing group, taking them by surprise. The Tamil Tigers soon returned fire after recovering from the initial attack, and all members of Bandara's team, including Bandara himself, were wounded. He personally evacuated the more seriously wounded members of his unit away from the battlefield. However, he ignored his own injuries and returned to lead his team every time, despite having the opportunity to stay back and receive medical attention. With the help of army reinforcements, Bandara and his team eventually managed to repulse the Tamil Tiger attack. By the time the battle ended, Bandara had suffered severe blood loss from his wounds, and died shortly after.

According to claims by the army, more than 70 Tamil Tigers were killed in the battle on 17 May. Two days later on 19 May 2009, the Tamil Tigers were militarily defeated by the Sri Lankan forces, and the government declared victory in the war.

== Recognition ==
Bandara was later promoted to the rank of Staff Sergeant. On 16 May 2012, it was announced in The Sri Lanka Gazette that Bandara would be posthumously awarded the Parama Weera Vibhushanaya, the country's highest military award for gallantry, along with 14 other recipients. The citation for his medal commends him for evacuating injured soldiers and returning to the battlefield repeatedly despite his own injuries:

Whilst leading the battle, he [Bandara] took action to evacuate injured soldiers to the rear for medical attention and went on fighting continuously displaying excellent fighting spirit with the support of reinforcement troops, without considering the security of his own life, though he had the opportunity to withdraw to the rear for medical treatment.

The medal was received by his next-of-kin from President Mahinda Rajapaksa on 19 May 2012, at the Victory day celebrations marking the third anniversary of the end of the war. It was the last Parama Weera Vibhushanaya awarded in the war.
