= Mahesh Bandara =

Sri Lankan cricketer (born 1982)

Mahesh Bandara (born Herath Mudiyanselage Mahesh Bandara Herath on 18 September 1982) was a Sri Lankan cricketer. He was a left-handed batsman and left-arm bowler who played for Moors Sports Club. He was born in Dehiwala.

Bandara made a single first-class appearance for the side, during the 2001–02 season, against Tamil Union Cricket and Athletic Club. In the only innings in which he batted, he scored 13 runs.

Bandara's only List A appearance came in the same season, against Colombo Cricket Club, against whom he scored 2 runs.
