= Boyagane Camp =

Military base in Sri Lanka

Boyagane Army Camp
- Kurunegala, North Western Province

Site information
- Type: Military Base
- Controlled by: Sri Lanka Army

Site history
- In use: 19?? – present

Garrison information
- Garrison: Vijayabahu Infantry Regiment

Boyagane Army Camp is a military base located close to the town of Kurunegala in the North Western Province of Sri Lanka. It serves as the regimental headquarters of the Vijayabahu Infantry Regiment of Sri Lanka Army.

== See also ==
- Vijayabahu Infantry Regiment
