= Gamini Kularatne =

Sri Lankan soldier

Corporal Gamini Kularatne † PWV
- ගාමිණී කුලරත්න
- Kularatne at Elephant Pass Siege, 1991
- Born: September 4, 1966
- Died: 14 July 1991 (aged 25); Elephant Pass, Sri Lanka
- Relatives: S.G Babanis (Father); S.G Juliet (Mother)
- Military career
- Allegiance: Sri Lanka
- Branch: Sri Lanka Army
- Service years: 1987-1991
- Rank: Corporal
- Nickname: Hasalaka Gamini
- Service number: (S/34553)
- Units: Sixth Battalion, Sri Lanka Sinha Regiment
- Conflicts: Sri Lankan civil war
- Awards: Parama Weera Vibhushanaya

Corporal Gamini Kularatne PWV, SLSR (S/34553) (Sinhala: ගාමිණී කුලරත්න; 4 September 1966 – 14 July 1991) (commonly known as Hasalaka Gamini or Hasalaka Sri Lankan Hero) was a Sri Lankan soldier. He was the first recipient of the Parama Weera Vibhushanaya, the highest award for gallantry awarded by the Sri Lanka Army, for his actions during the Elephant Pass Siege, in which he was killed.

== Early life ==
Gamini Kularatne was the second son of a family of four brothers and a sister. He obtained his primary education at Ranasinghe Premadasa Madhya Maha Vidyalaya at Hasalaka (a farming hamlet in the salubrious Kandy District of Sri Lanka). Some claim that he was a survivor of the Aranthalawa Massacre on 2 June 1987 while known as Mahiyangane Dhammajothi Thero. After seeing the brutality of the Tiger massacre he pleaded with the chief Thero and relinquished robes to join the Sri Lanka Army on 27 August 1987 with the blessings of his father S.G. Babanis and mother S.G. Juliet.

== Death ==
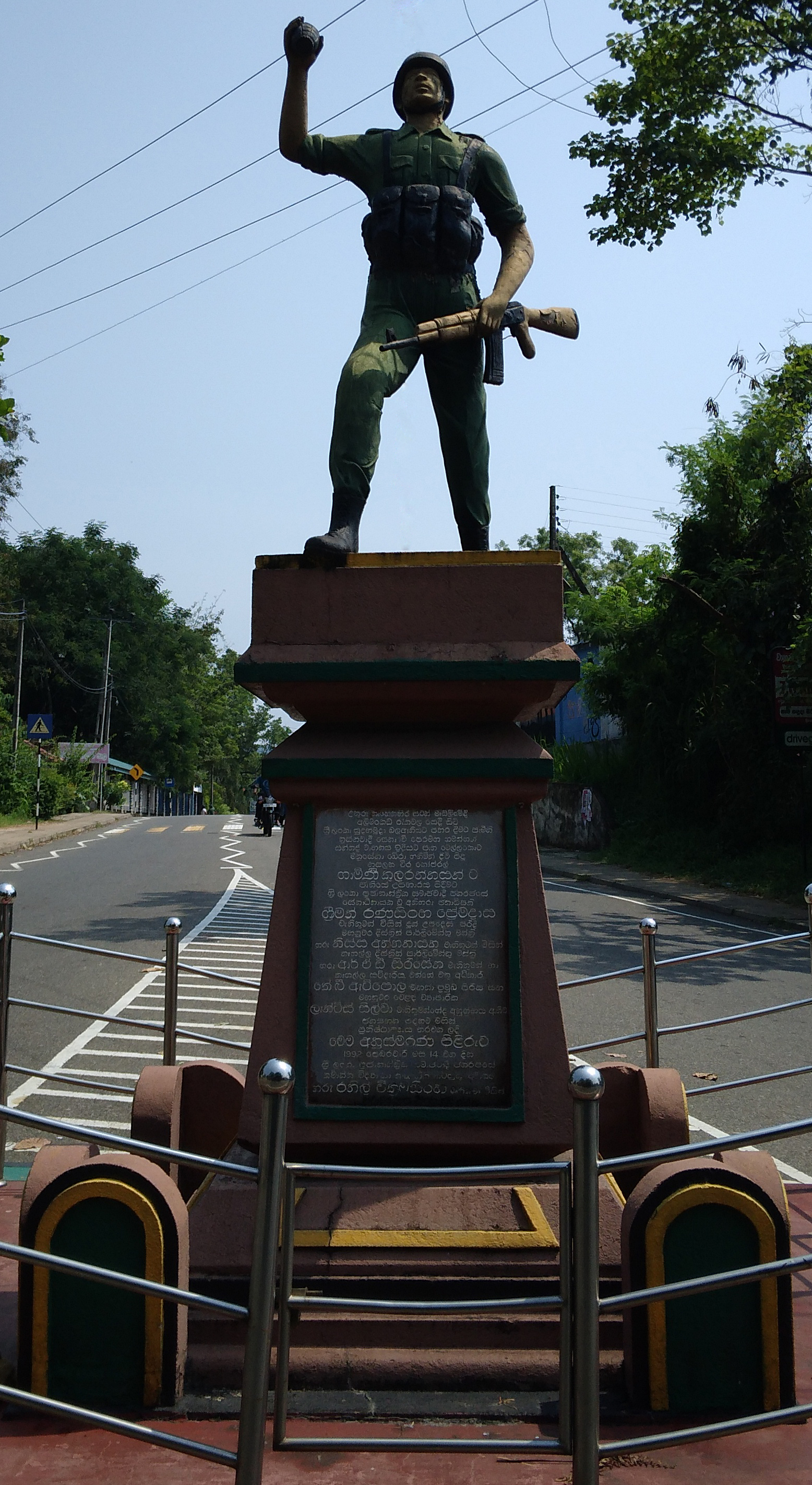
Corporal Gamini Kularatne Statue at Hasalaka.

On the night of 10 July 1991 over 5000 LTTE fighters surrounded the 600 strong army garrison located at Elephant Pass. The base was known as the gateway to the northern Jaffna Peninsula. Enlisted to the Sri Lankan Army Sinha Regiment Sixth Battalion as a Rifleman, Lance Corporal Gamini Kularatne, along with the rest of his regiment, was tasked with watching for possible LTTE infiltrators.

As dusk fell the LTTE launched several human wave attacks. Flanked by hundreds of armed fighters, they surrounded the Army's fortifications. As the battle ensued a previously unknown armored bulldozer resembling a tank advanced on the military installation.

Equipped with a machine gun and containing a haul of arms and ammunitions inside, the armored bulldozer rumbled towards the southern entrance of the camp. Lance Corporal Kularatne recognized the heavily armored rolling weapon would be able to break through the garrison's defenses. Above all the fall of Elephant Pass to the enemy would be catastrophic and counterproductive at a national level.

Although the LTTE began pounding the Army camp with heavy mortars and weapons to the cries of injured and dying soldiers amidst deafening explosions, all eyes were still centered on the enemy's approaching bulldozer.

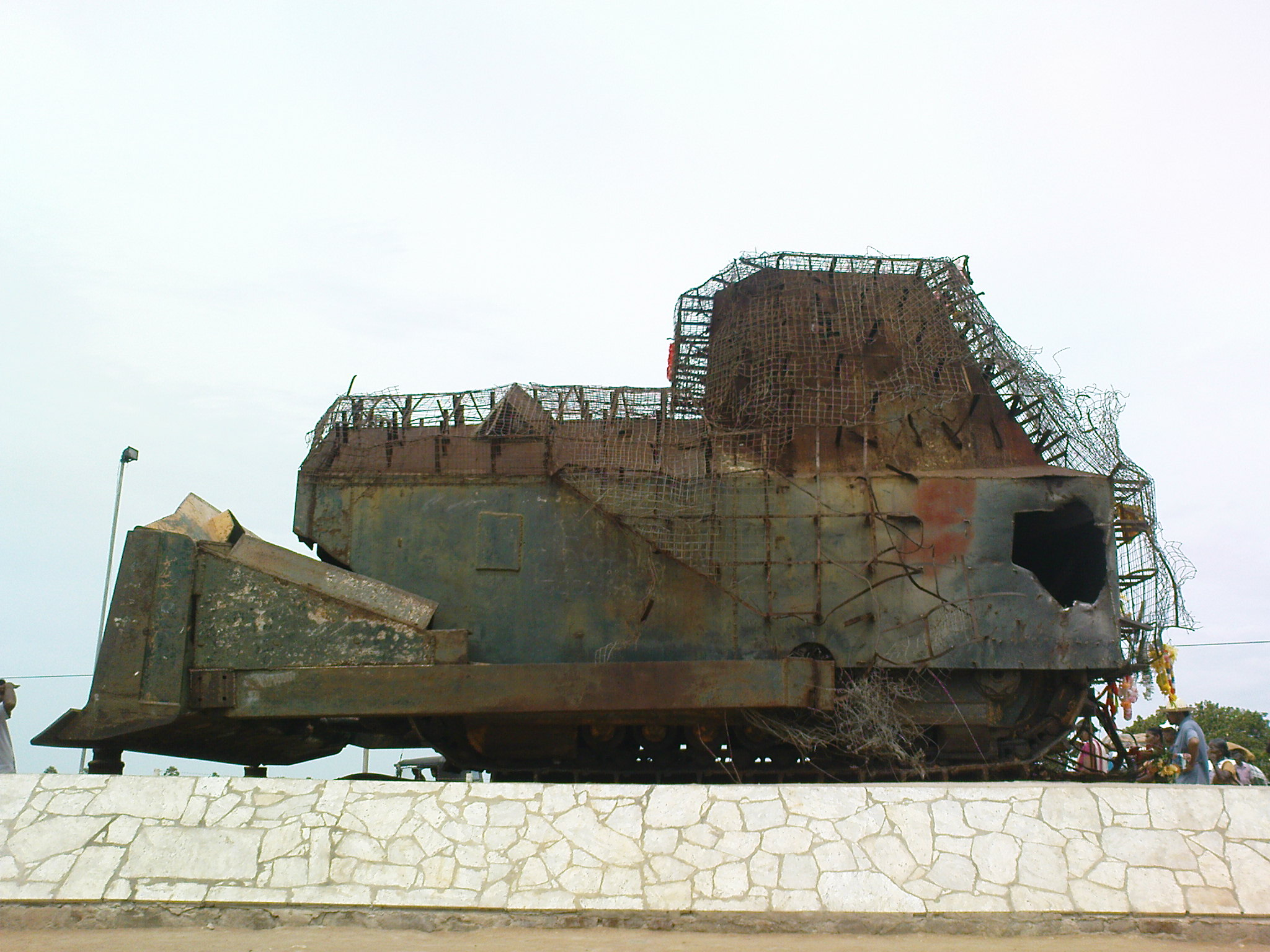
The Memorial to Gamini in Elephant Pass

Lance Corporal Kularatne, holding two grenades in his hands, dashed out towards the oncoming bulldozer tank, clambered up the tank's ladder and tossed the two grenades inside it, disregarding the LTTE bullets hitting him. The grenades disabled the bulldozer amidst bursts of fire accompanied by a series of explosions. Lance Corporal Kularatne was flung to the ground, only to lay motionless in the aftermath.

As the siege of Elephant Pass Army Camp was broken, one of the most ferocious battles in Sri Lanka's modern history ended. The camp had been saved from being overrun by the LTTE in part by Corporal Kularatne's bravery.

In recognition of his act of gallantry Lance Corporal Gamini Kularatne was promoted to the rank of Corporal posthumously and honored with the award of "Parama Weera Vibhushanaya" on 10 October 1991, the highest gallantry award in Sri Lanka for the first time in the history of Sri Lanka Army.

Later he came to be known as the Hasalaka Weeraya (Hasalaka Hero).

== Memorial ==
After the war was over, a memorial to Corporal Gamini was later set up in Elephant Pass with the remains of the bulldozer he destroyed. The memorial, as well as the destroyed vehicle, can be seen on the A9 road on the way to Jaffna. A statement made by Dambara Amila Thero in March, 2015 in recommending the removal of this memorial sparked massive public outcry and widespread condemnation.

The Sri Lankan baila music singer Dhanapala Udawatta sang "Hasalaka Gamini", a song tribute to the famous war hero.

== Honours and decorations ==

Parama Weera Vibhushanaya

== See also ==
- Awards and decorations of the military of Sri Lanka
- Elephant Pass
