= Naula =

Naula නාඋල
- Town
- Location within Sri Lanka
- Coordinates: 7°42′27″N 80°39′13″E
- Country: Sri Lanka
- Province: Central Province
- Elevation: 301 m (988 ft)
- Time zone: UTC+5:30 (Sri Lanka Standard Time)
- Postal code: 21090

Naula is a town in Sri Lanka. It is located within Matale district, Central Province. It is located in A9 road (Kandy-Jaffna) about 53 kilometers from Kandy. It is situated in an intermediate climate zone. The roads in the vicinity of Naula are known for picturesque scenery. Tourist attractions in the area include Bowathenna Dam, tank & Power station, Nalanda Gedige, Nalanda tank and the Nitre caves.

== See also ==
- List of towns in Central Province, Sri Lanka
