= Bandara Wijethunga =

Sri Lankan lyricist and radio announcer

Bandara Wijethunga බණ්ඩාර විජේතුංග
- Born: Senarath Bandara Ananda Kulathilaka Wijethunga; 28 January 1939; Kurunegala, Sri Lanka
- Died: 3 January 1990 (aged 50)
- Education: Ananda College
- Occupations: poet, short story writer, creative publisher, songwriter
- Years active: 1960–1990
- Spouse: Kalyani Piyasomi Samaraweera (m. 1969)
- Children: 1
- Parents: Wijetunga Mudiyanselage Punchi Banda Wijayatunga (father); Herath Mudiyanselage Bandara Menike Herath (mother)

Senarath Bandara Ananda Kulathilaka Wijethunga (born 28 January 1939 – 3 January 1990) (Sinhala: බණ්ඩාර විජේතුංග), popularly known as Bandara K. Wijethunga, was a poet, short story writer, creative publisher, songwriter and radio artist.

== Personal life ==
Wijetunga was born on 28 January 1939 in Pallegama Weliganwatta, Weauda Korale, Kurunegala. His father Wijetunga Mudiyanselage Punchi Banda Wijayatunga was a teacher by profession. His mother, Herath Mudiyanselage Bandara Menike Herath was a housewife. He has one sister Chinta Padmini, who was also a teacher. Wijetunga received his primary education at St. Beed College, Badulla. Then he attended Ananda College, Colombo in 1953 to complete studies from English medium. His classmates at the school are, J. B. Disanayake, D.B. Nihalsinghe, Sunanda Mahendra, Asoka Ponnamperuma and Wijeratne Warakagoda.

He was married to longtime partner Kalyani Piyasomi Samaraweera, who was an old girl at Devi Balika Vidyalaya. They married on August 6, 1969. The couple has one daughter, Uma Indeewari. Kalyani worked as an English lecturer at the Teacher Training College, Maharagama.

After losing his job at Radio Ceylon, he became a drunken person. Wijetunga died on January 3, 1990, after being admitted to the hospital at noon and died around 5 pm following a brief illness at the age of 50. The funeral took place on 6 January 1990 at the Borella Cemetery.

== Career ==
He was known as a talented artist, poet, short story writer and songwriter during school times. In 1957 he won first place in the Inter-school Art Exhibition. In 1958, he was the editor of Sinhala Lamaya magazine as well as the English magazine Enchanted. He has also won the Sivaguranathan Award for Best Autonomous Design. He attended radio announcements while in school and appeared as Ananda K. Wijethunga. Later, he opened the doors of the radio programs with his deep voice by editing the commemorative brochures of the films like Ran Muthu Duwa, Getavarayo, Saravita and Narilatha with the name Bandara K. Wijethunga. He first started as a relief announcer at Radio Ceylon. Wijetunga along with Tissa Liyanasuriya and K.A.W. Perera performed the radio magazine called Radio Sangarava.

His first job was as a Data Officer in the Exchange Control Department of the Bank of Ceylon. After a few years, he was chosen as the Publicity Officer of the State Film Corporation. During this period, all Hindi films imported by the Film Corporation have been promoted by Wijethunga.

He was also a talented poet, where he wrote the poetry Neth Dahasa. He also made cover titles, film catalogs and movie backgrounds for Amaranath Jayathilake's "Chithrapata Adyanaya" and Ajantha Ranasinghe's "Thivanka Rekha". Later he worked as a dubbing artist for many film characters. In 1965, he acted in the film Sweep Ticket and then in 1979 in the film Handaya.

As a radio songwriter, he became very popular with the songs "Mahada Namathi Wana Bambara" by H.R. Jothipala, "Ruwan Thoran Thana" and "Mulu Loke Pura" by Christopher Paul, "Ayubowan Ayubowan" by G. S. B. Rani. Apart from them, he also made lyrics to popular singers W.D. Amaradeva, Sanath Nandasiri, Milton Mallawarachchi, Victor Rathnayake, Neela Wickramasinghe and Sunil Edirisinghe. In 1984, Wijethunga won the award for the Best film lyricist at Presidential film festival for the film Ridee Nimnaya. He made lyrics for the films Podi Malli, Sri Madara, Sudda, Asha Dasin, Biththi Hathara, Madhusamaya. In 1992, the song "Sagara Weralaka Piya Satahan" in the film Madhusamaya won the award for the Best Lyricist at Sarasaviya and the Presidential award festivals. In 2001, his glossary work Sulanga Wage Awidin won State Literary Award for Best Lyricist of the Year.

After Sirimavo Bandaranaike was deprived of her civic rights, the artists signed a petition which included Wijethunga as well. The publication of songs and names of signatories was banned by the radio whereas Wijayatunga lost his radio job as well as the propaganda work of the National Film Corporation. He received the job after few years under the guidance of Nihal Silva.

== Filmography ==
=== As lyricist ===
| Year | Film | Other roles | Ref. |
|---|---|---|---|
| 1966 | Sudu Duwa | Screenwriter | |
| 1978 | Asha Dasin | | |
| 1979 | Podi Malli | | |
| 1980 | Mal Kekulu | | |
| 1981 | Bangali Walalu | | |
| 1981 | Sudda | | |
| 1982 | Bicycle | | |
| 1982 | Ridee Nimnaya | | |
| 1982 | Biththi Hathara | | |
| 1982 | Newatha Hamuwemu | | |
| 1984 | Jaya Sikurui | | |
| 1985 | Rajina | | |
| 1986 | Prarthana | Screenwriter | |
| 1986 | Dinuma | Screenwriter | |
| 1986 | Avurududa | | |
| 1987 | Hitha Honda Chandiya | | |
| 1987 | Yukthiyada Shakthiyada | | |
| 1988 | Rasa Rahasak | | |
| 1988 | Satana | | |
| 1989 | Randenigala Sinhaya | | |
| 1990 | Dedunnen Samanaliyak | | |
| 1991 | Sihina Ahase Wasanthaya | | |
| 1991 | Madhusamaya | | |
| 1991 | Salambak Handai | | |
| 1991 | Dhanaya | | |
| 1992 | Roomathiyay Neethiyay | | |
| 1993 | Sargent Nallathambi | | |
| 1993 | Sasara Sarisarana Thek Oba Mage | | |
| 1993 | Yasasa | | |
