= Gamini Hettiarachchi (military officer) =

Former Sri Lankan army officer

Major General Gamini Hettiarachchi
- Military career
- Allegiance: Sri Lanka
- Branch: Sri Lanka Army
- Service years: 1973 – 2006
- Rank: Major General
- Service number: O/50662
- Units: Special Forces Regiment; Sri Lanka Armoured Corps
- Commands: Security Forces Headquarters – East; 21 Division; Special Forces Brigade; 1st Special Forces Regiment
- Conflicts: Sri Lankan Civil War; Insurrection 1987-89
- Awards: Weera Wickrama Vibhushanaya; Rana Wickrama Padakkama; Rana Sura Padakkama; Vishista Seva Vibhushanaya; Uttama Seva Padakkama

Major General Gamini Hettiarachchi, WWV, RWP, RSP, VSV, USP is a retired Sri Lankan Army officer who served as the Commander, Security Forces Headquarters – East, General Officer Commanding, 21 Division and Brigade Commander, Special Forces Brigade. Having founded the Special Forces Regiment of the Sri Lankan Army, he is known as the "Father of the Special Forces Regiment".

Hettiarachchi joined the Sri Lanka Army as a cadet officer in 1973 and received his basic training at the Army Training Center in Diyatalawa. On completing his training he was commissioned as a Second Lieutenant in the Sri Lanka Armoured Corps (SLAC). He served as a Troop Commander and a Squadron Commander in the 1st Reconnaissance Regiment, SLAC. In 1985, the army formed a Combat Tracker Team under the command of Major Hettiarachchi consisting of two officers and 38 men to conduct direct action and covert reconnaissance against LTTE units operating in the thick jungles in the northern part of the island in small groups. This team was renamed the Rapid Deployment Force (RDF) (Special Force). This was the inception of the Special Forces Regiment which was officially formed on 10 December 1988 with Major Hettiarachchi as its commanding officer. With the formation of the Special Forces Brigade in 1996, Brigadier Hettiarachchi served as its second brigade commander in 1998. In March 2000, he was appointed General Officer Commanding of the 21 Division and was promoted to the rank of Major General on 1 February 2001. He then served as Colonel Commandant of the Sri Lanka Armoured Corps from 2001 to 2003. Commander, Security Forces Headquarters – East from 2004 to 2005. He retired from the army in 2006. A graduate of the Army War College, Mhow and the National Defence College, India; he has been awarded the Weera Wickrama Vibhushanaya, the Rana Wickrama Padakkama, the Rana Sura Padakkama, the Vishista Seva Vibhushanaya and the Uttama Seva Padakkama.

In July 2005, the President of Sri Lanka appointed Major General Hettiarachchi as the Director General of the Disaster Management Centre (DMC) tasked with establishing the Disaster Management Centre following the 2004 Indian Ocean earthquake and tsunami, in which capacity he served till May 2014. In December 2014, he was awarded the National Leadership Award for Disaster Resilience by the Ministry of Disaster Management along with the Asian Disaster Preparedness Centre, Bangkok. He is also a Fellow of the Academic Commons of the Disaster Resilience leadership Academy of the Tulane University. From 2015 to 2017, he served as the Chairmen of the Vocational Training Authority of Sri Lanka and thereafter Director Security of the [[Sri Lanka Ports Authority]].
