= Burniston Barracks =

Former military installation in England

- Burniston
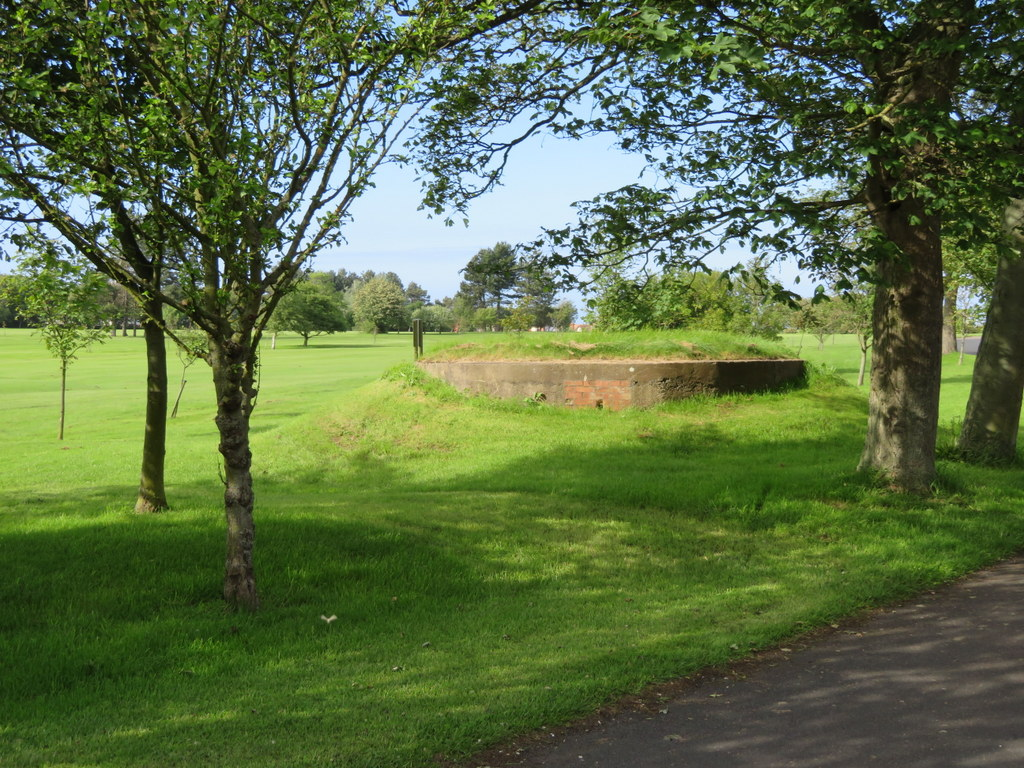
- A pillbox which is all that remains of Burniston Barracks

Site information
- Type: Barracks
- Owner: Ministry of Defence
- Operator: British Army

Location
- Location within North Yorkshire
- Coordinates: 54.295653°N 0.415699°W

Site history
- Built: 1861; 165 years ago
- Built for: War Office
- In use: 1861–1992

Burniston Barracks was a military installation on Burniston Road in Scarborough, North Yorkshire, England.

== History ==
The barracks were built as a training base for the Royal Artillery and were completed in 1861. The barracks were reallocated for wider military use in 1906 and during the First World War they served as the 3rd cavalry depot providing accommodation for the 10th Royal Hussars, the 14th King's Hussars, the 18th Royal Hussars and the 20th Hussars. Between the wars units of the Royal Corps of Signals were based at the barracks.

In April 1940, during the Second World War, five German airmen who had been rescued after their aircraft had been shot down were held at the barracks. The barracks were decommissioned in January 1992 and demolished in December 1993. A housing estate, waterpark and hotel now occupy most of the site.
