= Jayaweera Bandara (cricketer) =

Sri Lankan cricketer (born 1970)

Personal information
- Born: 5 February 1970 (age 56); Mawanella, Sri Lanka
- Source: Cricinfo, 10 February 2016

Jayaweera Bandara (born 5 February 1970) is a Sri Lankan former first-class cricketer who played for Colombo Cricket Club.
