= Vijayabahu Infantry Regiment =

- Active: 1 December 1980 – October 1983; 15 November 1988 – present
- Country: Sri Lanka
- Branch: Sri Lanka Army
- Type: Infantry
- Role: Counterinsurgency; Forward observer Jungle warfare Raiding; Reconnaissance
- Size: 27 battalions
- Regimental Headquarters: Boyagane Camp, Kurunegala.
- Nickname: Archers
- Mottos: "What – cannot they bear, those who are adept and well versed in their arts and crafts and professions"
- Colors: Maroon and Gold
- Mascot: Danurdha – Archer (Centaur)
- Anniversaries: 26 September
- Engagements: Sri Lankan Civil War, United Nations Stabilization Mission in Haiti; United Nations Stabilization Mission in Lebanon
- Decorations: 2 Parama Weera Vibhushanayas; 1 Weerodara Vibhushanaya
- Website: alt.army.lk/vir

Commanders
- Centre Commandant: Brigadier P M R H S K Herath RWP RSP
- Colonel of the Regiment: Major General R K B S Ketakumbura RSP

Insignia
- Cap badge of the Vijayabahu Infantry Regiment: "VIJAYABAHU INFANTRY REGIMENT" shoulder tab

The Vijayabahu Infantry Regiment is an infantry regiment of the Sri Lankan Army. Formed on 22 March 1988, it is named after Vijayabahu I of Polonnaruwa (King Vijayabahu, 1055 to 1110 AD). The regiment consists of 17 regular battalions, 9 volunteer battalions and a headquarters battalion. Since 1993, its Regimental Centre is located at the Boyagane Camp, Kurunegala.

== History ==
Originally formed in 1982 and disbanded in 1983 follow its amalgamated with the 1st Battalion, Rajarata Rifles form the Gajaba Regiment, the regiment was reformed on 22 March 1990. The first colonel of the regiment was W. J. V. K Wimalarathna. The regimental centre commandant was H. S. A. Perera. On 23 April 1993, the regiment was relocated to Boyagane Camp in Kurunegala District. The Regiment consists of 25 battalions, the first of which was established in 1988. The Regiment numbers 655 officers and 16,501 other ranks. A new Regimental office was opened in January 2010. It features a herbal garden in remembrance of the soldiers from the regiment who have been killed in service.

The Vijayabahu Infantry Regiment has deployed two contingents in December 2006 and June 2009 to the United Nations stabilisation mission in Haiti. and on 10 December 2011, one company to the United Nations peacekeeping mission in Lebanon.

== Training school ==
The Vijayabahu Infantry Training School was formed at Sinhavilluwaththa Puttlam on 15 January 1991. The first chief instructor was Upali Fernando. The school has conducted over sixty courses with nearly three hundred recruits per course. Over 13,127 recruits have been trained for distribution to various regiments. Special arms courses for officers and men have also been conducted at the school.

== Welfare activities ==
The regiment provides death insurance for officers and other ranks. The Regiment Centre also runs the Vijayabahu Motocross, a popular annual motor racing event. The regiment has its own motor racing track, built in 1998. The aim of the motocross is to generate funds to provide welfare facilities for the families of the officers and other ranks killed or missing in action. It also aims to improve infrastructure facilities and rehabilitation work for disabled soldiers.

== Sports activities ==
The regiment sports a volleyball team who won the champions of the Army "A" Division volleyball tournament of 2011. Disabled soldiers of the regiment participated in the Asian Para Games – 2011, as well as Commonwealth Para Games 2011.

== Seva Vanitha activities ==
The Vijayabahu Seva Vanitha Branch (wives' auxiliary) supports the families of fallen soldiers. They have taken steps to facilitate the constructions work of Abimansala – Brave Hearts Wellness Resort for totally disabled war heroes by donating Rs 1.5 million on 2 September 2010, Rs 100,000.00 on 1 October 2010, Rs 5.45 million on 4 October 2010 and Rs 6 million on 11 July 2011. The total fundraising was Rs 13.05 million. The Branch has held commemoration ceremonies for the families of the killed and missing officers on 3 July 2010 and 14 May 2011 and has built 19 houses for the families of fallen and missing soldiers. The women visit Ranaviru Sevana, Military and Mental Hospital, Mullariyawa.

== Recipients of the Parama Weera Vibhushanaya ==
- Major K. A. Gamage †
- Staff Sergeant H. G. S. Bandara †
- Sergeant P. N. Suranga †

== Recipients of the Weerodara Vibhushanaya ==
- Corporal W. M. Karunaratne - 1998

== Fallen Officers ==
- Colonel Gamini Fernando † 1 June 1995 – Commanding Officer of 1st Vijayabahu Infantry Regiment
- Colonel Nizam Dane † 24 June 1997– Commanding Officer of the 10th Battalion of the Vijayaba Infantry Regiment
- Lt. Colonel T. R. A. Aliba † 18 July 1996- Commanding Officer of the 6th Battalion of the Vijayaba Infantry Regiment in the Battle of Mullaitivu (1996)
- Lt. Colonel N. H. K Silva † 18 July 1996
- Major Janaka Kasturiarachchi † 18 July 1996 – Brigade Major, 25 Brigade in the Battle of Mullaitivu (1996)
- Major C. N. Siyambalangoda †

== Units ==
| No | Unit | Formed | Formed at | Disbanded | Notes |
|---|---|---|---|---|---|
| 1 | 1st Battalion of the Vijayabahu Infantry Regiment | 10 November 1988 | Malay Street | | |
| 2 | 2nd (V) Battalion of the Vijayabahu Infantry Regiment | 12 November 1988 | Tissawewa | | |
| 3 | 3rd (V) Battalion of the Vijayabahu Infantry Regiment | 4 December 1989 | Sandunpura, Dehiattakandiya | | First commanding officer was Lieutenant Colonel S.D. Lankadeva |
| 4 | 4th Battalion of the Vijayabahu Infantry Regiment | 1 August 1989 | Kandy | | |
| 5 | 5th Battalion of the Vijayabahu Infantry Regiment | 20 March 1990 | Sinahavilluwatta, Puttlam | | |
| 6 | 6th Battalion of the Vijayabahu Infantry Regiment | 17 August 1990 | Army Training School at Maduruoya | | First commanding officer was Major G.M. Rockwood. |
| 7 | 7th Battalion of the Vijayabahu Infantry Regiment | 3 November 1992 | Sinhavilluwatta, Puttlam | | |
| 8 | 8th Battalion of the Vijayabahu Infantry Regiment | 23 August 1993 | Sinhavilluwatta, Puttlam | | 5th (Reinforcement) Battalion Vijayabahu Infantry Regiment raised on 23 August 1993, re-designated as 8th Battalion of the Vijayabahu Infantry Regiment on 23 August 1993 |
| 9 | 9th Battalion of the Vijayabahu Infantry Regiment | 6 September 1996 | Elephantpass | | |
| 10 | 10th (V) Battalion of the Vijayabahu Infantry Regiment | 1 June 1994 | Monkeybridge Camp at Trincomalee | | |
| 11 | 11th Battalion of the Vijayabahu Infantry Regiment | 10 January 1997 | Achchuveli, Jaffana | | This Battalion was amalgamated with 4th Battalion Vijayabahu Infantry Regiment on 10 October 1990 and was de-amalgamated on 15 November 2007 |
| 12 | 12th (V) Battalion of the Vijayabahu Infantry Regiment | 10 January 1997 | Nunavil | | |
| 13 | 14th Battalion of the Vijayabahu Infantry Regiment | 8 January 2008 | Nelumwewa | | |
| 14 | 15th (V) Battalion of the Vijayabahu Infantry Regiment | 1 December 2007 | Sadunpara, Dehiaththakandiya | 22 January 2019 | |
| 15 | 16th (V) Battalion of the Vijayabahu Infantry Regiment | 7 July 2008 | Punani | 04 February 2019 | |
| 16 | 17th (V) Battalion of the Vijayabahu Infantry Regiment | 2 January 2009 | Boyagane | | |
| 17 | 18th Battalion of the Vijayabahu Infantry Regiment | 21 October 2008 | Mallavi | | |
| 18 | 19th Battalion of the Vijayabahu Infantry Regiment | 1 January 2009 | Kilinochchi | | |
| 19 | 20th (V) Battalion of the Vijayabahu Infantry Regiment | 13 March 2009 | Kokeliya Army Camp in Vauniya | | |
| 20 | 21st (V) Battalion of the Vijayabahu Infantry Regiment | 12 August 2009 | Jaffna | 30 March 2012 | |
| 21 | 22nd Battalion of the Vijayabahu Infantry Regiment | 23 September 2009 | Kallar | | |
| 22 | 23rd Battalion of the Vijayabahu Infantry Regiment | 24 November 2009 | Vellikkulam, Nedunkerny | | |
| 23 | 24th Battalion of the Vijayabahu Infantry Regiment | 4 March 2010 | Panagoda | | |
| 24 | 25th Battalion of the Vijayabahu Infantry Regiment | 1 December 2008 | | Disbanded | 1st Reinforcement Battalion of the Vijayabahu Infantry Regiment raised on 1 December 2008 and later renamed as the 25th Battalion Vijayabahu Infantry Regiment. |
| 25 | 26th Battalion of the Vijayabahu Infantry Regiment | | | Disbanded | |
| 26 | 27th Battalion of the Vijayabahu Infantry Regiment | 20 May 2009 | Gajasinghepura | Disbanded | 3rd Reinforcement Battalion of the Vijayabahu Infantry Regiment which was later renamed as the 27th Battalion Vijayabahu Infantry Regiment |
| 27 | Headquarters battalion of the Vijayabahu Infantry Regiment | 23 August 1993 | Sihavilluwatta, Puttlam | | |

== Order of precedence ==
| Preceded by Gajaba Regiment | Order of Precedence | Succeeded by Mechanized Infantry Regiment |

== See also ==
- Sri Lanka Army
- Gajaba Regiment

== External links and sources ==
- Sri Lanka Army
- Vijayabahu Infantry Regiment
- Unsung VIR Soldiers Commended
