= Sri Lanka Sinha Regiment =

- ශ්‍රී ලංකා සිංහ රෙජිමේන්තුව
- SLSR Crest
- Active: 1 October 1956 – present
- Country: Sri Lanka
- Branch: Sri Lanka Army
- Type: Infantry
- Size: 21 battalions
- Regimental Centre: Ambepussa Camp
- Mottos: නිර්භීත වේගවත් Nirbhitha Vegavath (Sinhala: Swift and Bold)
- Colors
- Mascot: Cougar the lion
- Anniversaries: 1 October (regimental day)
- Engagements: Sri Lankan Civil War; United Nations Stabilization Mission in Haiti; Insurrection 1987-89; 1971 Insurrection
- Decorations: 5 Parama Weera Vibhushanayas, 2 Weerodara Vibhushanayas
- Website: alt.army.lk/slsr/

Commanders
- Centre Commandant: Brigadier PMS Karunaratne psc
- Colonel of the Regiment: Major General AMC Abeykoon RWP RSP USP ndc

Insignia
- Flag

The Sri Lanka Sinha Regiment (SLSR) (Sinhala: ශ්‍රී ලංකා සිංහ රෙජිමේන්තුව Śrī Laṃkā Sinha Rejimēnthuva) is an infantry regiment of the Sri Lanka Army; it is the second oldest infantry regiment in the army.

== History ==
Sri Lanka Sinha Regiment was the first rifle regiment of the Sri Lanka Army and was formed on 1 October 1956 at the Imperial camp at Diyatalawa. The first battalion primarily consisted of 60 officers and other ranks from the Ceylon Light Infantry with Lt Col R. D. Jayathilaka MBE as the first commanding officer.

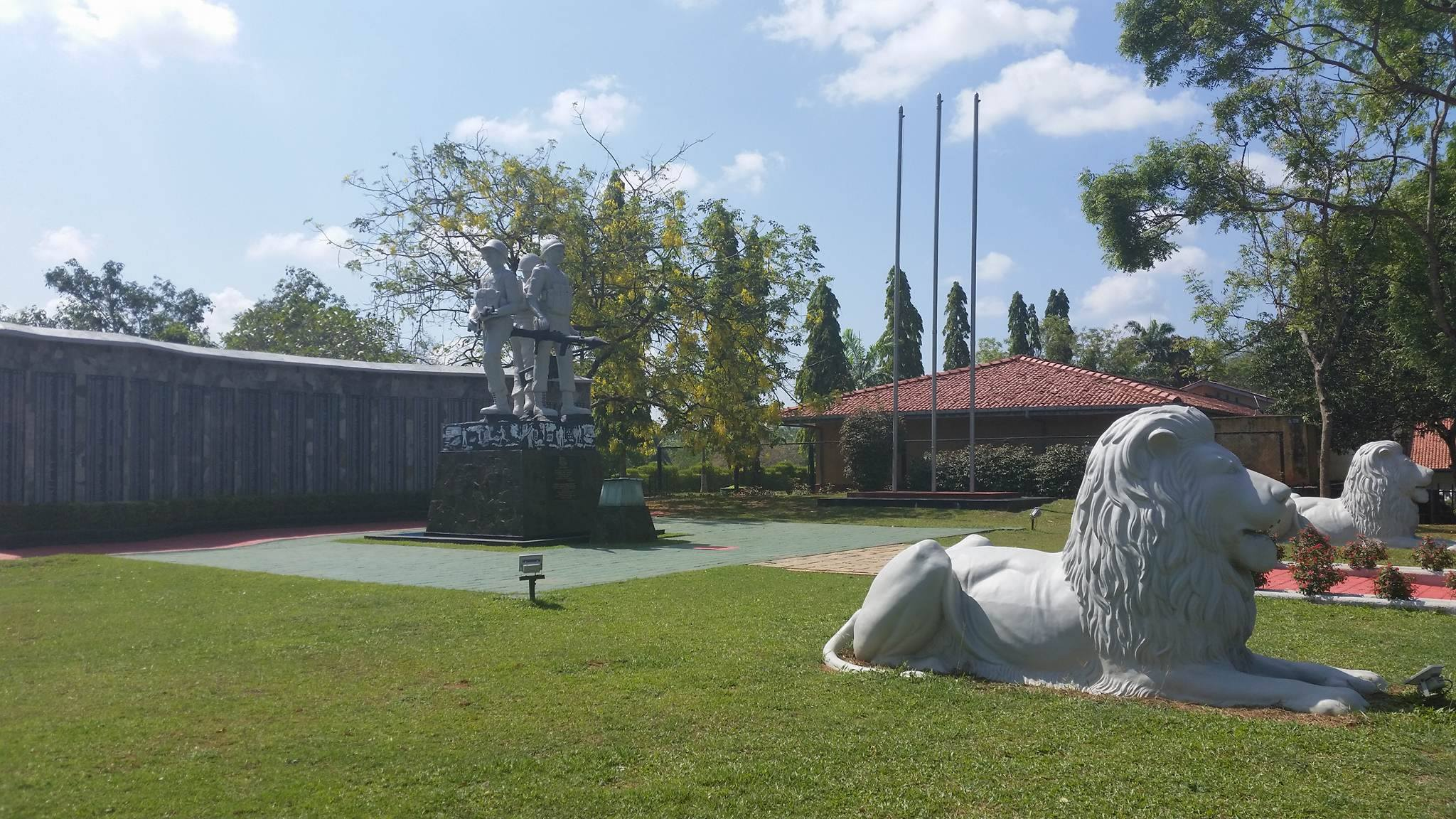
Sinha Regiment War Memorial of Ambepussa Army Camp.This memorial dedicated to all military personnel of Sinha Regiment killed in action

The D company of the volunteer Ceylon Light Infantry was transformed into the Rajarata Rifles under the leadership of Lt Col (later Colonel) S.D. Ratwatte, and went on to become the 2nd Volunteer Battalion of the Sinha Regiment on 1 October 1956. On 1 October 1969 the 3rd Volunteer Battalion of the Sinha Regiment was formed at Hill School in Nuwara Eliya.

The regiment first saw action during the 1971 Insurrection and underwent an expansion with escalation of the Sri Lankan Civil War. With the expansion of the regiment the Regimental Centre of Sri Lanka Sinha Regiment was established on 9 May 1988 at Diyatalawa at the same location where the 1st Battalion of the Sinha Regiment was raised. Brig D Wijesingha was the first regimental commander. Later, on 21 October 1989 the Regimental Centre was relocated to Ambepussa Camp where the 1st Battalion of the Sinha Regiment was at that time. The regiment distinguished itself greatly during the Sri Lankan Civil War including having three Parama Weera Vibhushanaya and one Weerodara Vibhushanaya recipients. In 1990 the elements of the 6th Battalion successfully held the old Dutch fort of Jaffna for two months while surrounded and under siege until it was relieved by the subsequent Operation Thrividha Balaya. July 1991 the 6th Battalion garrisoned Elephant Pass base when it came under siege with the LTTE launching a massive attack on the base. The battalion held out what was termed the battle of all battles until it was relieved following Operation Balavegaya 18 days later.

On 3 May 2005 a contingent of troops from the regiment took part in the United Nations Stabilization Mission in Haiti.

The Sri Lanka Sinha Regiment is the only regiment in the history of the Sri Lanka Army to produce an army commander holding the rank of a full general (four star) and later a Field Marshal as indicated in the notable members area.

As a rifle regiment it marches in 140 steps a minute during parade when it is involved, together with the regimental band - the only Sri Lanka Army regiment to do so.

General Officer Commanding 54 Infantry Division Major General AMC Abeykoon RWP RSP USP ndc assumed duties as the 20th Colonel of the Regiment of the Sri Lanka Sinha Regiment on 29 December 2025. Brigadier PMS Karunaratne psc assumed duties as the 27th Commandant of the Regimental Centre Sri Lanka Sinha Regiment on 19 December 2025 during a charm ceremony held at the Regimental Centre, Ambepussa.

== Units ==
No	Unit	Formed	Formed at	Disbanded	Notes
1	1st Battalion, Sri Lanka Sinha Regiment	1 October 1956	Imperial Camp in Diyatalawa		
2	2nd (V) Battalion, Sri Lanka Sinha Regiment	1 October 1956			Disbanded Rajarata Rifles was re-activated and re-designated as 2nd (V) Battalion, Sri Lanka Sinha Regiment
3	3rd (V) Battalion, Sri Lanka Sinha Regiment	1 October 1969	Hill School, Nuwara Eliya		
4	4th Battalion, Sri Lanka Sinha Regiment	1 December 1985	Ambepussa Camp		
5	5th (V) Battalion, Sri Lanka Sinha Regiment	1 February 1987	Kandy Camp		
6	6th Battalion, Sri Lanka Sinha Regiment	10 August 1987	CTS Ampara		First commanding officer was Lieutenant Colonel A.G. Weerasekara
7	7th Battalion, Sri Lanka Sinha Regiment	12 May 1990	Ambepussa Camp		First commanding officer was Major K.M.D.U.M. Kendaragama
8	8th Battalion, Sri Lanka Sinha Regiment	16 October 1992	Konduwatuwana Camp		First commanding office was Major J.C. Kotelawala
9	9th Battalion, Sri Lanka Sinha Regiment	1 January 1993	Welioya Camp		
10	10th Battalion, Sri Lanka Sinha Regiment	23 January 1994	Sankattaravayal Camp		On 12 March 2012 re-designated as the 2nd Mechanized Infantry Regiment
11	11th (V) Battalion, Sri Lanka Sinha Regiment	16 April 1994	Dewahuwa Camp		
12	12th Battalion, Sri Lanka Sinha Regiment	9 December 1996	Ambepussa Camp		
13	14th Battalion, Sri Lanka Sinha Regiment	16 December 1996	Ambepussa Camp		
14	15th (V) Battalion, Sri Lanka Sinha Regiment	16 April 1994	Ponnalei Camp		
15	16th Battalion, Sri Lanka Sinha Regiment	17 February 1997	Ambepussa Camp		
16	17th (V) Battalion, Sri Lanka Sinha Regiment	1 December 2007	Kataragama Camp		
17	18th (V) Battalion, Sri Lanka Sinha Regiment	30 March 2008	Kalawanchikudai Camp	3 August 2018	
18	19th (V) Battalion, Sri Lanka Sinha Regiment	31 August 2008	Katukeliyawa Camp	03 September 2018	
19	20th Battalion, Sri Lanka Sinha Regiment	1 October 2008	Vavunikulam Camp		
20	21st Battalion, Sri Lanka Sinha Regiment	1 December 2008	Ambepussa Camp		
21	22nd (V) Battalion, Sri Lanka Sinha Regiment	1 July 2009	Ambepussa Camp	10 March 2012	
22	23rd Battalion, Sri Lanka Sinha Regiment	1 August 2009	Pooneryn Camp		
23	24th Battalion, Sri Lanka Sinha Regiment	1 October 2009	Alampil Camp		
24	25th Battalion, Sri Lanka Sinha Regiment	20 September 2010	Pampeimadu Camp	Disbanded	2nd RFT Battalion Sinha Regiment re-designated as 25th Battalion, Sri Lanka Sinha Regiment
25	26th Battalion, Sri Lanka Sinha Regiment	20 September 2010	Vedivettukallu Camp	Disbanded	3rd RFT Battalion Sinha Regiment re-designated as 26th Battalion, Sri Lanka Sinha Regiment
26	27th Battalion, Sri Lanka Sinha Regiment	20 September 2010	Gajasinghepura Camp	29 February 2012	4th RFT Battalion Sinha Regiment re-designated as 27th Battalion, Sri Lanka Sinha Regiment
27	28th Battalion, Sri Lanka Sinha Regiment	20 September 2010	Madu Camp	29 February 2012	1st RFT Battalion Sinha Regiment re-designated as 28th Battalion, Sri Lanka Sinha Regiment
28	RHQ Battalion, Sri Lanka Sinha Regiment	25 November 1999			

== Recipients of the Parama Weera Vibhushanaya ==
- Corporal Gamini Kularatne †
- Captain Saliya Upul Aladeniya †
- Lance-Corporal A. M. B. H. G. Abeyrathnebanda †
- Sergeant A. M. Anura †
- Lance Corporal K. G. M. Rajapaksha †

== Recipients of the Weerodara Vibhushanaya ==
- Captain (QM) P. L. S. L. Cooray - 1989
- Corporal R. P. R. Wickramapala - 1998

== Commanders ==
- Field Marshal Sarath Fonseka, RWP, RSP, VSV, USP, rcds, psc – 18th Commander of the Sri Lanka Army
- General G. H. de Silva, RWP, VSV, USP – 13th Commander of the Sri Lanka Army

== Chiefs of Staff ==
- Major General H.S Hapuarachchi – 26th Chief of Staff of the Sri Lanka Army.
- Major General Dinesh Nanayakkara, RSP, VSV, USP, ndu – 65th Chief of Staff of the Sri Lanka Army.

== Deputy Chiefs of Staff ==
- Major General Gemunu Kulatunge, RSP, USP † – 4th Deputy Chief of Staff of the Sri Lanka Army.
- Major General Jaliya Nammuni, RSP, VSV, USP – 6th Deputy Chief of Staff of the Sri Lanka Army.
- Major General Kumudu Perera, RWP, RSP, VSV, USP, ndu– 31st Deputy Chief of Staff of the Sri Lanka Army.
- Major General G.R.R.P Jayawardena, RWP, RSP, ndu – 42nd Deputy Chief of Staff of the Sri Lanka Army.

== Notable Members ==
- General Anuruddha Ratwatte – Former Cabinet Minister and Deputy Minister of Defence
- Major General E. G. Thevanayagam
- Major General MAM Dias RWP, RSP, VSV, USP, PSC – Former General Officer Commanding, 54 Division in Mannar
- Major General Laksiri Waduge RWP RSP VSV USP ndu – Former Commander Security Forces Headquarters – Central
- Major General Susantha Mendis † – Former Brigade Commander, 512 Brigade.
- Major General D.W. Hapuarachchi – Commanding Officer - 1st Bn SLSR, Founder Commanding Officer Sri Lanka National Guard
- Brigadier T.S.B. Sally - Commanding Officer – 1st Bn SLSR, Chief of Staff, Sri Lanka Army.
- Brigadier S.B. Miyanadeniya – Commanding Officer - 1st Bn SLSR, Director Training SL Army
- Major D.M.L.B.Dissanayake RSP – Commanding Officer - 15th Bn SLSR
- Staff Sergeant Pradeep Sanjaya, – Bronze medalist 400m London Paralympics 2012, 4th Battalion Sri Lanka Sinha Regiment.

== Order of precedence ==
Preceded by Sri Lanka Light Infantry	Order of precedence	Succeeded by Gemunu Watch

== See also ==
- Sri Lanka Army

== External links and sources ==
- Official website
