= Sugath Chandrasiri Bandara =

Sri Lankan soldier and Parama Weera Vibhushanaya recipient

Sergeant Sugath Chandrasiri Bandara † PWV
- සුගත් චන්ද්‍රසිරි බණ්ඩාර
- Born: Dissanayake Mudiyanselage Sugath Chandrasiri Bandara; 10 June 1977; Bibile, Sri Lanka
- Died: 3 February 2009 (aged 31); Puthukkudiyiruppu, Sri Lanka
- Spouse: Mangalika (wife)
- Relatives: 1 daughter
- Military career
- Allegiance: Sri Lanka
- Branch: Sri Lanka Army
- Service years: 1997–2009
- Rank: Sergeant
- Service number: S/462696
- Unit: Sri Lanka Army Special Forces
- Awards: Parama Weera Vibhushanaya

Dissanayake Mudiyanselage Sugath Chandrasiri Bandara, PWV (Sinhala: දිසානායක මුදියන්සේලාගේ සුගත් චන්ද්‍රසිරි බණ්ඩාර; died 3 February 2009) was a Sri Lanka Army soldier. He served with the army's elite Special Forces Regiment during Eelam War IV, the final stage of the Sri Lankan Civil War. Chandrasiri Bandara received the Parama Weera Vibhushanaya, Sri Lanka's highest military award for gallantry, for thwarting a suicide attack by the Liberation Tigers of Tamil Eelam (commonly known as LTTE or Tamil Tigers) against the army at the cost of his own life.

== Early life and education ==
Chandrasiri Bandara was born and raised in Bibile, a town in the Monaragala District. He later married Mangalika and moved to Ratmalana. The couple had one daughter.

== Career ==
In 1996, Chandrasiri Bandara joined the Police Department as a Police Constable. Later, on 15 June 1997, he joined the Sri Lanka Army and underwent Training No. 1 at the Special Forces Training School as a recruit soldier. Recognizing his exceptional abilities and performance in the Special Forces, he subsequently went on to successfully complete the challenging Special Forces Course No. 22.

=== Action on 3 February 2009 ===
The battle and Chandrasiri Bandara's death occurred near Puthukkudiyiruppu.

By early February 2009, the Sri Lankan military had confined the Tamil Tigers to a small area around Puthukkudiyiruppu. On 3 February, the Tamil Tigers launched an attack, pushing back the army's Task Force 4 (later 64th Division). Units of the 2nd Special Forces were called in to halt this attack. At the time, Chandrasiri Bandara was serving as a corporal in this unit.

The Tamil Tigers sent an explosive laden armour-plated truck against the Special Forces, in an attempted suicide attack. Small arms fire was ineffective against the vehicle, and Chandrasiri Bandara, who was armed with a RPG-7 rocket launcher, went forward to engage it. Although he fired a rocket at the vehicle, it failed to detonate and he was forced to reload.

By this time, the vehicle was too close for Chandrasiri Bandara to fire the RPG safely without getting caught in the blast himself. However, he promptly fired at the truck for the second time. The rocket penetrated through the armour plating and detonated, blowing up the explosive-laden vehicle. The explosion killed Chandrasiri Bandara, but the majority of the group of soldiers targeted by the suicide attack were saved.

== Legacy ==
=== Recognition ===
Chandrasiri Bandara was posthumously promoted to the rank of Sergeant. He was also recommended for the Parama Weera Vibhushanaya for his actions, and on 16 May 2012, the Defence Secretary announced in The Sri Lanka Gazette that Chandrasiri Bandara and 14 others would receive the medal.

President Mahinda Rajapaksa presented the medal to his next-of-kin on 19 May 2012, the third anniversary of the end of the war. Chandrasiri Bandara was the fourth recipient of the medal from the Special Forces. In the citation for his Parama Weera Vibhushanaya, he is commended for his actions in the face of imminent death, "without any retreating to defend his own life and with the intention of safeguarding the lives of his comrades". His name, along with other recipients from the regiment, is engraved on a special monumental plaque at their Brigade Headquarters in Vavuniya.
