= Navya Shekhawat =

Indian Army officer

Major Navya Shekhawat
- Alma mater: Officers Training Academy
- Military career
- Allegiance: India
- Branch: Indian Army
- Service years: 2021–present
- Rank: Major
- Unit: Army Service Corps
- Known for: First woman Indian Army officer appointed as Aide-de-Camp (ADC) to the President of India

Major Navya Shekhawat, ADC, is an officer of the Indian Army. She is the first women officer from the Indian Army to serve as the Aide-de-Camp to the President of India.

== Background ==
She was commissioned into the Indian Army in 2021. She underwent pre-commission training at the Officers Training Academy, Chennai. In July 2026, Shekhawat was appointed as the first woman officer from the Indian Army to serve as an Aide-de-Camp (ADC) to the President of India, Droupadi Murmu.

== See also ==
- Pooja Thakur
