= Pooja Thakur =

Pooja Thakur may refer to:

- Pooja Thakur (Indian Airforce) (born 1979), Indian Air Force officer
- Pooja Thakur (kabaddi) (born 1990), Indian kabaddi player
