= Indian Air Force: A Cut Above =

Indian combat mobile game

- Developer: Threye Interactice Pvt Ltd (Threye: Military Games)
- Publisher: Indian Air Force
- Platforms: Android iOS
- Release: July 31, 2019; 7 years ago
- Genre: Combat flight simulator
- Modes: Single-player, multiplayer

Indian Air Force: A Cut Above is an Indian combat mobile game, based on Indian Air Force, developed by Threye Interactice, based in New Delhi, India. It was officially launched on 31 July 2019 by the Air Chief Marshal B. S. Dhanoa for Android and iOS. In November 2019 Google picked the game to be part of the Best Game 2019 awards (in the 'Users Choice Game' category). The Vice Chief of Air Staff Air Marshal Harjit Singh Arora released the multiplayer version of the game.

The game has three training levels where the user is taught the various intricacies of the game such as taking off, landing gear operations, air-control, target hitting and various other things. The game features a character similar to Abhinandan Varthaman's featuring his gunslinger mustache, however customization is possible. The game has three difficulty levels. The game allows the user to control a variety of the IAFs arsenal including the MI-17 V5 helicopter, the Mirage 2000, Sukhoi Su 30, BAE Hawk, C-17, AH-64 Apache as well as the Rafale. In the Multiplayer option in both deathmatch and team battle, the Indigenous HAL TejasMig 29 as well as the venerable Mig-21 appears . Also the S-400 missile system, Bofors anti aircraft guns and Stinger MANPADS make appearances. The controls however have been described as "clunky" and a few errors and loopholes have enabled the players to land on and take off from enemy carrier battle groups and even the water surface . the gameplay has been compared to the "arcade style of simulation found in games like Ace Combat and Tom Clancy’s H.A.W.X.".

The game, as explained in the information section of Google Play Store, "allows IAF aspirants to experience first hand the roles of an air warrior, as well as means to apply and appear for recruitment from the comfort of a mobile phone". An IAF spokesperson reiterated this saying that "the primary aim of this game is to get youth attracted to the profession of military aviation, while providing information about career options in the Indian Air Force."

A Cut Above is a follow-up to the 2014 game called Guardians of the Skies which was also produced by the IAF. Guardians of the Skies had won various awards such as "Best mobile application (game) in 2014 from Microsoft India" and was also awarded by Unity3D. Threye, a Delhi-based game development studio, won the contract from the Air Force from a bid of over 120 participants in 2013.

== Gameplay ==
The game has ten missions in total as part of its storyline:

1.Humanitarian Mission:

The game starts with the player flying an Mi-17 helicopter in a flooded area by a dam breach.The player has to drop 3 supply drops at different locations to complete the mission.

2.Combat Strike Operation:

It is later revealed that the dam breach was caused by a foreign terrorist group. As that unnamed country denies to prosecute them, the player is assigned to fly a Mirage-2000 to conduct surgical strikes of a terrorist camp in that country along with a group of Garud Commandos who would raid the camp later on. As they leave, the player has to provide them top cover by shooting down any aircraft attempting to intercept them.

3.Air Defence Operation:

In response to the strikes, the enemy country retaliates by striking the airbase from which, the operation was launched. This time, the player flies a Sukhoi Su-30 MKI and interceps the incoming enemy fighters and bombers.

4.Combat Support Operation:

As war efforts spread out on both sides, the player gets the task of flying a C-17 Globemaster strategic airlifter to resupply the forward bases with critical supplies and equipment. The player has to evade enemy surface-to-air missiles and a fighter jet in order to land the aircraft on a forward airbase.

5.Anti-tank and SEAD:

In this mission, the player gets the order to destroy a group of enemy tanks attempting to capture a critical bridge with his Ah-64 Apache attack helicopter. Once this is done, he has to destroy some tactical radars posing a threat to the air ops in the area.

6.Deep Strike Operation:

In this mission, the player gets to fly the advanced Dassault Rafale in a mission to destroy a major enemy airbase. This mission also features the uses of electronic weaponry in jamming a radar site, and the long-range SCALP/Storm Shadow to destroy its air defence systems. As the enemy scrambles its fighter jets to shoot him down, he has to intercept and neutralize the jets.

7.Mid-air Refueling:

This mission is a sequel to the previous one. After completing the airstrike on the base, the player eventually runs low on fuel along with another Rafale and tries to refuel from an IL-78 tanker. However, enemy jets are detected in between and he has to neutralize them before refueling from his buddy as the tanker exits the area.

8.Maritime Strike Operation:

As the war escalates, enemy deploys its aircraft carrier. The player is tasked with sinking it with Brahmos missile, launched from his Sukhoi Su-30 and later, destroy the few enemy jets that managed to take off.

9.Base Defence Operation:

The enemy manages to secure few more planes from another country and launches another major strike on an Indian airbase. In this mission, the player gets the command of various anti-aircraft defence systems to neutralize the strike, including the long-range S400 Triumph, medium-range L-70 gun and the short-range MANPADS.

10.Futuristic Weapons:

In the last mission, the enemy acquires an advanced enemy drone mothership that attempts to destroy a major nuclear reactor and the player is tasked with bringing it down with his Dassault Rafale while encountering enemy fighter jets and a swarm of UCAVs.
