= Pooja Thakur (Indian Airforce) =

Indian Air Force officer

Wing Commander Pooja Thakur
- Born: 1979 (age 46–47)
- Military career
- Allegiance: India
- Branch: Indian Air Force
- Service years: 2001-2016
- Rank: Wing Commander
- Other work: Guardians of the Skies

Wing Commander Pooja Thakur is a retired Indian Air Force Officer. She was the first female commanding officer of the Tri-Services Guard of Honour, which was inspected by then-US President Barack Obama at the Rashtrapati Bhawan in January 2015.

Thakur also contributed during the development stage of the Guardians of the Skies, a video game that features Indian Air Force pilots. She gave two Tedx Talks, one in 2015 and the other in 2017.

== Military career ==
Thakur is from the 17 SSC (W) G Course. She was commissioned into the Administrative Branch of the Indian Air Force on 16 Jun 2001 and was promoted to the rank of Wing Commander on 16 June 2014.

=== Controversies ===
She was refused a permanent commission, so she went to the AFT and filed a case.
