= Guardians of the Skies =

2014 video game

- Developer: Threye Interactice Pvt Ltd (Threye: Military Games)
- Publisher: Indian Air Force
- Platforms: Android, iOS, Microsoft
- Release: 3 July 2014
- Genre: Combat flight simulator
- Modes: Single-player, multiplayer

Guardians of the Skies is the first video game produced by the Indian Air Force, released in 2014. After an open tender process a private developer based in New Delhi, Threye, was chosen to develop the game. Air Marshal S. Sukumar launched the first phase of game on 3 July 2014. The first phase went onto get over a million downloads and won the "Best Indian Game" on its app store award from Microsoft in 2014 before the second phase was launched. On 12 December 2014 Chief of the Air Staff Air Chief Marshal Arup Raha launched phase two at the IAF Auditorium, New Delhi.

During the launch event Air Marshal Sukumar said the game is "a significant milestone in our consorted campaign to connect to the best of the boys and the girls among the nation's youth and motivate them to join the air force."

The game presents a fictional storyline and enemy, and is based on the IAF having mission against an imaginary rogue nation called Zaruzia, which is politically unstable and economically under-developed and has also witnessed a coup d'état. The game provides ten missions and lets the user experience the "pilot's seat of Indian Air Force's every platform - fighters, bombers, transports, choppers and special forces." Training missions help the user get a hang of the interface and controls. Difficulty settings can also be changed. However a review in Windows Central noted that "there are also times when the aircraft veers off course, straying randomly across the sky."

After Guardians of the Skies, the IAF launched another game called "Indian Air Force: A Cut Above" on 31 July 2019 for Android and iOS. Both games are similar in many ways and puts the player in the role of the IAF pilot completing missions. There are various other similarities also in the sense of overall graphics, but on the other hand user-interface and game design has changed.
