= Indian Air Force =

Aerial service branch of the Indian Armed Forces

- Bhāratīya Vāyu Senā
- Emblem of the Indian Air Force
- Founded: 26 January 1950; 76 years ago (as current service) 8 October 1932; 94 years ago (as Royal Indian Air Force)
- Country: India
- Type: Air force
- Role: Aerial warfare
- Size: 149,000 active personnel 140,000 reserve personnel 1,750 aircraft (approx)
- Part of: Indian Armed Forces
- Headquarters: Vayu Sena Bhawan, Motilal Nehru Marg, New Delhi.
- Mottos: Nabhaḥ Spr̥śaṁ Dīptam (ISO) transl. "Touch the Sky with Glory" (Taken from Bhagavad Gita)
- Colours
- March: Quick: Dēśa Pukārē Jaba Saba Kō (When the Country Calls Everyone); Slow: Vāyu Sēnā Niśāna (The Air Force Emblem)
- Anniversaries: Air Force Day: 8 October
- Engagements: Notable operations: World War II; Indo-Pakistani War of 1947; Congo Crisis; Operation Vijay; Indo-Pakistani War of 1965; Operation Cactus-Lilly; Battle of Boyra; Bangladesh Liberation War; Operation Meghdoot; Operation Poomalai; Operation Pawan; Operation Cactus; Kargil War; Pakistan Navy Atlantic shootdown; 2019 Balakot airstrike; India–Pakistan border skirmishes (2019); 2020–2021 China–India skirmishes; Operation Ganga; 2025 India–Pakistan conflict
- Website: indianairforce.nic.in

Commanders
- Commander-in-Chief: (India) President Droupadi Murmu
- Chief of the Air Staff (CAS): Air Chief Marshal Ashutosh Dixit
- Vice Chief of the Air Staff (VCAS): Air Marshal Inderpal Singh Walia
- Deputy Chief of the Air Staff (DCAS): Air Marshal Tejpal Singh
- Notable commanders: Marshal of the Indian Air Force Arjan Singh; Air Chief Marshal Pratap Chandra Lal; Air Marshal Subroto Mukherjee

Insignia
- Roundel

- Fin flash

- Flag

- President's Colour

Aircraft flown
- Attack: Jaguar, Eitan, Harop
- Electronic warfare: A-50E/I, Netra AEW&C
- Fighter: Rafale, Su-30MKI, Tejas, Mirage 2000, MiG-29, Jaguar
- Helicopter: CH-47 Chinook, Dhruv, Chetak, Cheetah, Mi-8, Mi-17, Mi-26
- Attack helicopter: Prachand, Apache AH-64E, Mi-25/35, Rudra
- Reconnaissance: Searcher II, Heron
- Trainer: Hawk Mk 132, HJT-16 Kiran, Pilatus C-7 Mk II
- Transport: C-130J, C-17 Globemaster III, CH-47F (I) Chinook, Il-76, An-32, HS 748, Do 228, EADS CASA C-295, Boeing 737, ERJ 135, Boeing 777
- Tanker: Il-78 MKI

The Indian Air Force (IAF) (ISO: Bhāratīya Vāyu Senā) is the air arm of the Indian Armed Forces. Its primary mission is to secure Indian airspace and to conduct aerial warfare during armed conflicts. It was officially established on 8 October 1932 as an auxiliary air force of British India which honoured India's aviation service during World War II.

Since 1950, the IAF has been involved in four wars with neighbouring Pakistan. Other major operations undertaken by the IAF include Operation Vijay, Operation Meghdoot, Operation Cactus and Operation Poomalai. The IAF's mission expands beyond engagement with hostile forces, with the IAF participating in United Nations peacekeeping missions.

The President of India holds the rank of Supreme Commander of the IAF. As of 1 January 2025, 135,000 personnel are in service with the Indian Air Force. The Chief of the Air Staff, an Air chief marshal, is a four-star officer and is responsible for the bulk of operational command of the Air Force. There is never more than one serving ACM at any given time in the IAF. The rank of Marshal of the Air Force has been conferred by the President of India on one occasion in history, to Arjan Singh. On 26 January 2002, Singh became the first and so far, only five-star rank officer of the IAF.

== Mission ==
Evolution of the IAF roundel over the years: 1. 1933–1942; 2. 1942–1945; 3. 1947–1950; 4. 1950 – present

The IAF's mission is defined by the Armed Forces Act of 1947, the Constitution of India, and the Air Force Act of 1950. It decrees that in the aerial battlespace:

Defence of India and every part there of including preparation for defence and all such acts as may be conducive in times of war to its prosecution and after its termination to effective demobilisation.

- The Primary objective of IAF is to defend the nation and its airspace against Air threats in coordination with Army and Navy.
- The secondary purpose is to assist civil power during natural calamities and internal disturbances.
- The IAF provides close air support to the Indian Army troops in the battlefield and also provides strategic and tactical airlift capabilities.
- IAF also provides strategic air lift or secondary Airlift for the Indian Army.
- The IAF also operates the Integrated Space Cell together with the other two branches of the Indian Armed Forces, the Department of Space and the Indian Space Research Organization (ISRO).
- Rescue of civilians during natural disasters
- Evacuation of Indian nationals from foreign countries in case of instability or other problems

In practice, this is taken as a directive meaning the IAF bears the responsibility of safeguarding Indian airspace and thus furthering national interests in conjunction with the other branches of the armed forces. The IAF provides close air support to the Indian Army troops on the battlefield as well as strategic and tactical airlift capabilities. The Integrated Space Cell is operated by the Indian Armed Forces, the civilian Department of Space, and the Indian Space Research Organisation. By uniting the civilian run space exploration organisations and the military faculty under a single Integrated Space Cell the military is able to efficiently benefit from innovation in the civilian sector of space exploration, and the civilian departments benefit as well.

The Indian Air Force, with highly trained crews, pilots, and access to modern military assets provides India with the capacity to provide rapid response evacuation, search-and-rescue (SAR) operations, and delivery of relief supplies to affected areas via cargo aircraft. The IAF provided extensive assistance to relief operations during natural calamities such as the cyclone in 1998, the tsunami in 2004, and the floods in 2013. The IAF has also undertaken relief missions such as Operation Rainbow in Sri Lanka.

== History ==
=== Formation and early pilots ===
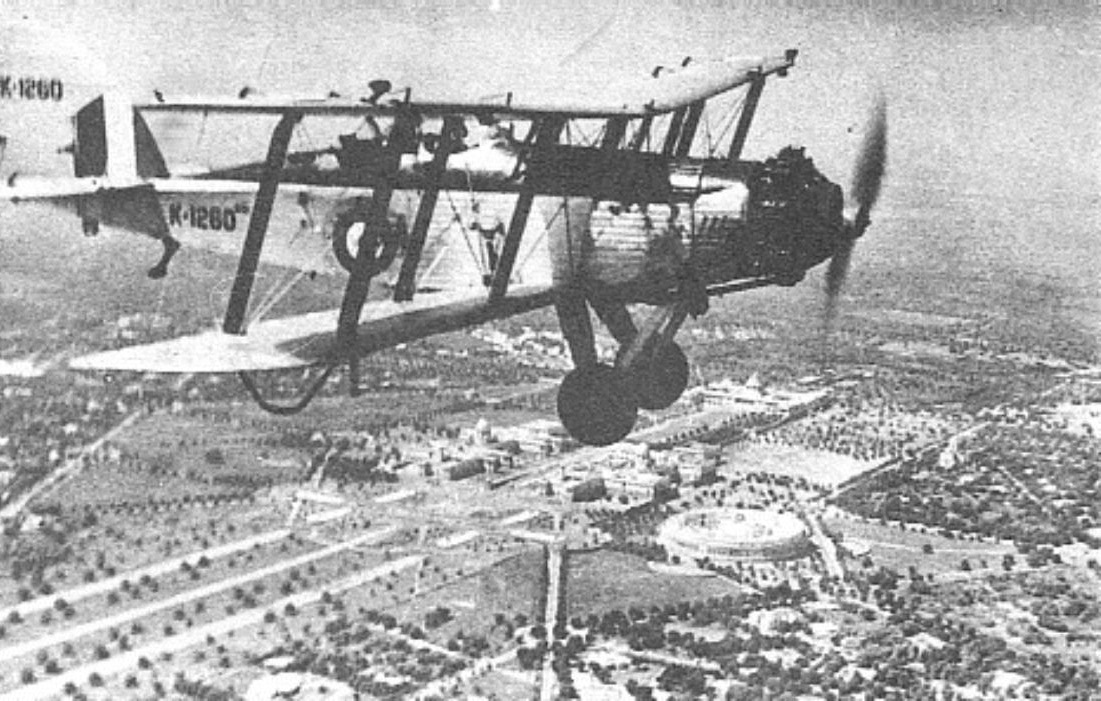
A Westland Wapiti, one of the first aircraft of the Indian Air Force

The Indian Air Force was established on 8 October 1932 in British India as an auxiliary air force of the Royal Air Force. The enactment of the Indian Air Force Act 1932 stipulated out their auxiliary status and enforced the adoption of the Royal Air Force uniforms, badges, brevets and insignia. On 1 April 1933, the IAF commissioned its first squadron, No.1 Squadron, with four Westland Wapiti biplanes and five Indian pilots. The Indian pilots were led by British RAF Commanding officer Flight Lieutenant (later Air Vice Marshal) Cecil Bouchier.

"A" flight of No 1. Squadron first saw action in April 1936, in Miranshah, in North Waziristan, flying reconnaissance missions and providing ground support against tribal insurgents in the North-West Frontier. No 1. Squadron was expanded in April 1939 to from a "B" flight, also equipped with Westland Wapiti biplanes, and "C" flight, raised in June 1938 brought the squadron to full strength.

=== World War II (1939–1945) ===
During World War II, the IAF played an instrumental role in halting the advance of the Japanese army in Burma, where the first IAF air strike was executed. The target for this first mission was the Japanese military base in Arakan, after which IAF strike missions continued against the Japanese airbases at Mae Hong Son, Chiang Mai and Chiang Rai in northern Thailand.

The IAF was mainly involved in strike, close air support, aerial reconnaissance, bomber escort and pathfinding missions for RAF and USAAF heavy bombers. RAF and IAF pilots would train by flying with their non-native air wings to gain combat experience and communication proficiency. Besides operations in the Burma Theatre IAF pilots participated in air operations in North Africa and Europe.

In addition to the IAF, many native Indians and some 200 Indians resident in Britain volunteered to join the RAF and Women's Auxiliary Air Force. One such volunteer was Sergeant Shailendra Eknath Sukthankar, who served as a navigator with No. 83 Squadron. Sukthankar was commissioned as an officer, and on 14 September 1943, received the DFC. Squadron Leader Sukthankar eventually completed 45 operations, 14 of them on board the RAF Museum's Avro Lancaster R5868. Another volunteer was Assistant Section Officer Noor Inayat Khan a Muslim pacifist and Indian nationalist who joined the WAAF, in November 1940, to fight against Nazism. Noor Khan served bravely as a secret agent with the Special Operations Executive (SOE) in France, but was eventually betrayed and captured. Many of these Indian airmen were seconded or transferred to the expanding IAF such as Squadron Leader Mohinder Singh Pujji DFC who led No. 4 Squadron IAF in Burma.

During the war, the IAF experienced a phase of steady expansion. New aircraft added to the fleet included the US-built Vultee Vengeance, Douglas Dakota, the British Hawker Hurricane, Supermarine Spitfire, and Westland Lysander. 22 Distinguished Flying Crosses were awarded to personnel of the IAF.

In recognition of the valiant service by the IAF, King George VI conferred the prefix "Royal" in 1945. Thereafter the IAF was referred to as the Royal Indian Air Force. In 1950, when India became a republic, the prefix was dropped and it reverted to being the Indian Air Force.

=== First years of independence (1947–1950) ===
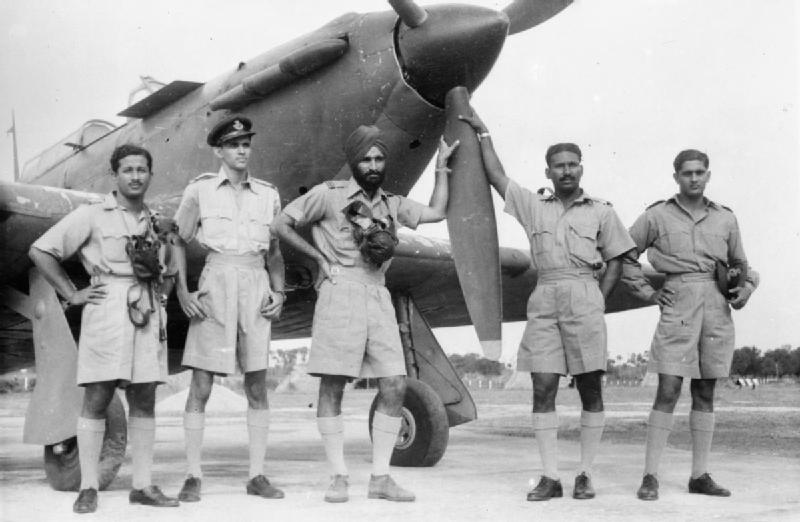
World War II photo: Arjan Singh (middle) as Flight Lieutenant. He went on to become Marshal of the Air Force

After it became independent from the British Empire in 1947, British India was partitioned into the new states of the Dominion of India and the Dominion of Pakistan. Along the lines of the geographical partition, the assets of the air force were divided between the new countries. India's air force retained the name of the Royal Indian Air Force, but three of the ten operational squadrons and facilities, located within the borders of Pakistan, were transferred to the Royal Pakistan Air Force. The RIAF Roundel was changed to an interim 'Chakra' roundel derived from the Ashoka Chakra.

Around the same time, war broke out between them over the control of the princely state of Jammu & Kashmir. With Pakistani forces moving into the state, its Maharaja decided to accede to India in order to receive military help. The day after, the Instrument of Accession was signed, the RIAF was called upon to transport troops into the war zone. And this was when a good management of logistics came into help. This led to the eruption of full-scale war between India and Pakistan, though there was no formal declaration of war. During the war, the RIAF did not engage the Pakistan Air Force in air-to-air combat; however, a couple of IAF Hawker Tempest fighters did intercept a Pakistani Douglas DC-3 transport aircraft & tried to shoot it down but the pilot of the DC-3 (Mukhtar Ahmad Dogar) managed to evade the fighters. Other than that, it also provided effective transport and close air support to the Indian troops.

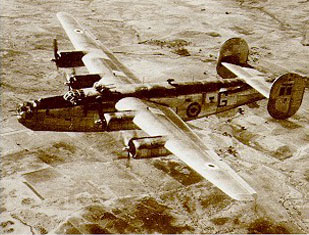
An IAF Consolidated B-24 Liberator heavy bomber over the Deccan Plateau in the early 1950s

When India became a republic in 1950, the prefix 'Royal' was dropped from the Indian Air Force. At the same time, the current IAF roundel was adopted.

=== Congo crisis and Annexation of Goa (1960–1961) ===
The IAF saw significant conflict in 1960, when Belgium's 75-year rule over Congo ended abruptly, engulfing the nation in widespread violence and rebellion. The IAF activated No. 5 Squadron, equipped with English Electric Canberra, to support the United Nations Operation in the Congo. The squadron started undertaking operational missions in November. The unit remained there until 1966, when the UN mission ended. Operating from Leopoldville and Kamina, the Canberras soon destroyed the rebel Air Force and provided the UN ground forces with its only long-range air support force.

In late 1961, the Indian government decided to attack the Portuguese colony of Goa after years of disagreement between New Delhi and Lisbon. The Indian Air Force was requested to provide support elements to the ground force in what was called Operation Vijay. Probing flights by some fighters and bombers were carried out from 8–18 December to draw out the Portuguese Air Force, but to no avail. On 18 December, two waves of Canberra bombers bombed the runway of Dabolim airfield taking care not to bomb the Terminals and the ATC tower. Two Portuguese transport aircraft (a Super Constellation and a DC-6) found on the airfield were left alone so that they could be captured intact. However the Portuguese pilots managed to take off the aircraft from the still damaged airfield and made their getaway to Portugal. Hunters attacked the wireless station at Bambolim. Vampires were used to provide air support to the ground forces. In Daman, Mystères were used to strike Portuguese gun positions. Ouragans (called Toofanis in the IAF) bombed the runways at Diu and destroyed the control tower, wireless station and the meteorological station. After the Portuguese surrendered the former colony was integrated into India.

=== Border disputes and changes in the IAF (1962–1971) ===
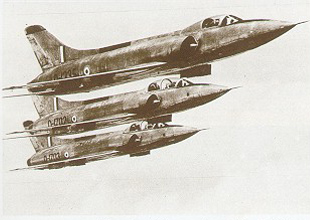
HAL HF-24 Maruts flying in formation. These were the first indigenous fighter jet to enter service with the IAF

In 1962, border disagreements between China and India escalated to a war when China mobilised its troops across the Indian border. During the Sino-Indian War, India refrained from using the air force as it lacked the defence equipments to counter Chinese retaliation.

On 24 April 1965, an Indian Ouragan strayed over the Pakistani border and was forced to land by a Pakistani Lockheed F-104 Starfighter, the pilot was returned to India; however, the captured aircraft would be kept by the Pakistan Air Force(PAF) and ended up being displayed at the PAF museum in Peshawar.

Three years after the Sino-Indian conflict, in 1965, Pakistan launched Operation Gibraltar, strategy of Pakistan to infiltrate Jammu and Kashmir, and start a rebellion against Indian rule. This came to be known as the Second Kashmir War. This was the first time the IAF actively engaged an enemy air force. However, instead of providing close air support to the Indian Army, the IAF carried out independent raids against PAF bases. These bases were situated deep inside Pakistani territory, making IAF fighters vulnerable to anti-aircraft fire. During the course of the conflict, the PAF enjoyed technological superiority over the IAF and had achieved substantial strategic and tactical advantage due to the suddenness of the attack and advanced state of their air force. The IAF was restrained by the government from retaliating to PAF attacks in the eastern sector while a substantive part of its combat force was deployed there and could not be transferred to the western sector, against the possibility of Chinese intervention. Moreover, international (UN) stipulations and norms did not permit military force to be introduced into the Indian state of J&K beyond what was agreed during the 1949 ceasefire. Despite this, the IAF was able to prevent the PAF from gaining air superiority over conflict zones. The small and nimble IAF Folland Gnats proved effective against the F-86 Sabres of the PAF earning it the nickname "Sabre Slayers". By the time the conflict had ended, the IAF lost 60–70 aircraft, while the PAF lost 43 aircraft. More than 60% of IAF's aircraft losses took place in ground attack missions to enemy ground-fire, since fighter-bomber aircraft would carry out repeated dive attacks on the same target. According to, Air Chief Marshal Arjan Singh of the Indian Air Force, despite having been qualitatively inferior, IAF achieved air superiority in three days in the 1965 War.

After the 1965 war, the IAF underwent a series of changes to improve its capabilities. In 1966, the Para Commandos regiment was created. To increase its logistics supply and rescue operations ability, the IAF inducted 72 HS 748s which were built by Hindustan Aeronautics Limited (HAL) under licence from Avro. India started to put more stress on indigenous manufacture of fighter aircraft. As a result, HAL HF-24 Marut, designed by the famed German aerospace engineer Kurt Tank, were inducted into the air force. HAL also started developing an improved version of the Folland Gnat, known as HAL Ajeet. At the same time, the IAF also started inducting Mach 2 capable Soviet MiG-21 and Sukhoi Su-7 fighters.

=== Bangladesh Liberation War (1971) ===
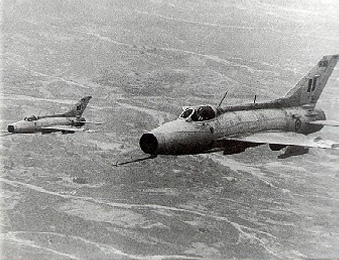
A pair of MiG-21s during the 1971 war

By late 1971, the intensification of the independence movement in East Pakistan lead to the Bangladesh Liberation War between India and Pakistan. On 22 November 1971, 10 days before the start of a full-scale war, four PAF F-86 Sabre jets attacked Indian and Mukti Bahini positions at Garibpur, near the international border, however, Two of the four PAF Sabres were shot down and one damaged by the IAF's Folland Gnats. On 3 December, India formally declared war against Pakistan following massive preemptive strikes by the PAF against Indian Air Force installations in Srinagar, Ambala, Sirsa, Halwara and Jodhpur. However, the strikes failed, as the IAF did not suffer any significant damage because of advance intelligence, and the leadership had anticipated such a move and precautions were taken. The Indian Air Force was quick to respond to Pakistani air strikes, following which the PAF carried out mostly defensive sorties.

Within the first two weeks, the IAF had carried out almost 12,000 sorties over East Pakistan and also provided close air support to the advancing Indian Army. IAF also assisted the Indian Navy in its operations against the Pakistani Navy in the Bay of Bengal and Arabian Sea. On the western front, the IAF destroyed more than 20 Pakistani tanks, 4 APCs and a supply train during the Battle of Longewala. The IAF undertook strategic bombing of West Pakistan by carrying out raids on oil installations in Karachi, the Mangla Dam and a gas plant in Sindh. Similar strategy was also deployed in East Pakistan and as the IAF achieved complete air superiority on the eastern front, the ordnance factories, runways, and other vital areas of East Pakistan were severely damaged. By the time Pakistani forces surrendered, the IAF destroyed 94 PAF Aircraft The IAF was able to conduct a wide range of missions – troop support; air combat; deep penetration strikes; para-dropping behind enemy lines; feints to draw enemy fighters away from the actual target; bombing; and reconnaissance. In contrast, the Pakistan Air Force, which was solely focused on air combat, was blown out of the subcontinent's skies within the first week of the war. Those PAF aircraft that survived took refuge at Iranian air bases or in concrete bunkers, refusing to offer a fight. Hostilities officially ended at 14:30 GMT on 17 December, after the fall of Dacca on 15 December. India claimed large gains of territory in West Pakistan (although pre-war boundaries were recognised after the war), and the independence of Pakistan's East wing as Bangladesh was confirmed. The IAF had flown over 16,000 sorties on both East and West fronts; including sorties by transport aircraft and helicopters. while the PAF flew about 30 and 2,840. More than 80 per cent of the IAF's sorties were close-support and interdiction, and according to neutral assessments about 45 IAF Aircraft were lost while, Pakistan lost 75 aircraft. Not including any F-6s, Mirage IIIs, or the six Jordanian F-104s which failed to return to their donors. But the imbalance in air losses was explained by the IAF's considerably higher sortie rate, and its emphasis on ground-attack missions. On the ground Pakistan suffered most, with 9,000 killed and 25,000 wounded while India lost 3,000 dead and 12,000 wounded. The loss of armoured vehicles was similarly imbalanced. This represented a major defeat for Pakistan. Towards the end of the war, IAF's transport planes dropped leaflets over Dhaka urging the Pakistani forces to surrender, demoralising Pakistani troops in East Pakistan.

=== Incidents before Kargil (1984–1988) ===
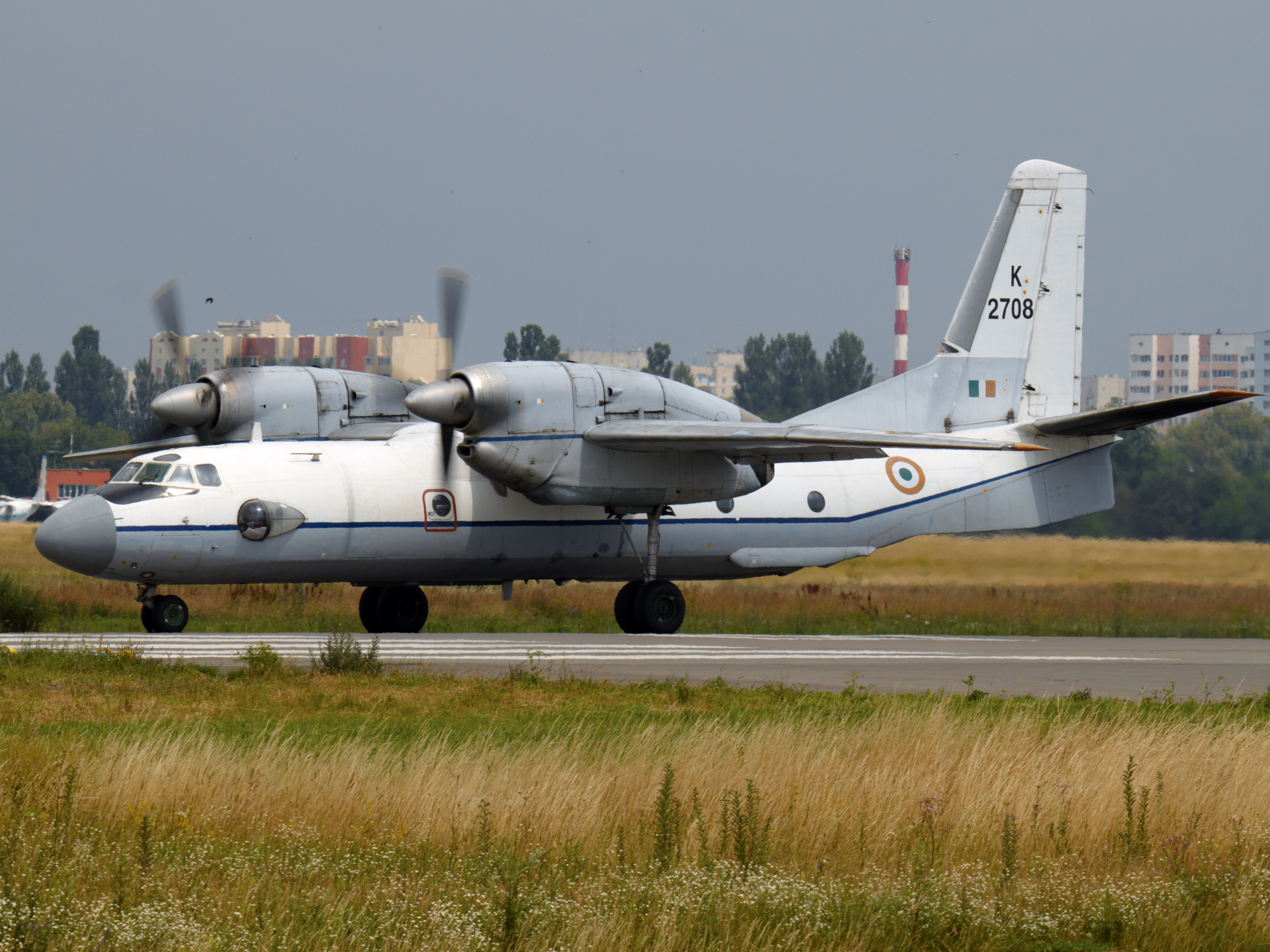
IAF An-32s were used to airdrop humanitarian supplies in Operation Poomalai

In 1984, India launched Operation Meghdoot to capture the Siachen Glacier in the contested Kashmir region. In Op Meghdoot, IAF's Mi-8, Chetak and Cheetah helicopters airlifted hundreds of Indian troops to Siachen. Launched on 13 April 1984, this military operation was unique because of Siachen's inhospitable terrain and climate. The military action was successful, given the fact that under a previous agreement, neither Pakistan nor India had stationed any personnel in the area. With India's successful Operation Meghdoot, it gained control of the Siachen Glacier. India has established control over all of the 70 kilometres (43 mi) long Siachen Glacier and all of its tributary glaciers, as well as the three main passes of the Saltoro Ridge immediately west of the glacier—Sia La, Bilafond La, and Gyong La. Pakistan controls the glacial valleys immediately west of the Saltoro Ridge. According to the TIME magazine, India gained more than 3,000 square kilometres (1,000 sq mi) of territory because of its military operations in Siachen.

Relief supplies dropped by the IAF over Jaffna during Operation Poomalai

Following the inability to negotiate an end to the Sri Lankan Civil War, and to provide humanitarian aid through an unarmed convoy of ships, the Indian Government decided to carry out an airdrop of the humanitarian supplies on the evening of 4 June 1987 designated Operation Poomalai (Tamil: Garland) or Eagle Mission 4. Five An-32s escorted by four Mirage 2000 of 7 Sqn AF, 'The Battleaxes', carried out the supply drop which faced no opposition from the Sri Lankan Armed Forces. Another Mirage 2000 orbited 150 km away, acting as an airborne relay of messages to the entire fleet since they would be outside radio range once they descended to low levels. The Mirage 2000 escort formation was led by Wg Cdr Ajit Bhavnani, with Sqn Ldrs Bakshi, NA Moitra and JS Panesar as his team members and Sqn Ldr KG Bewoor as the relay pilot. Sri Lanka accused India of "blatant violation of sovereignty". India insisted that it was acting only on humanitarian grounds.

In 1987, the IAF supported the Indian Peace Keeping Force (IPKF) in northern and eastern Sri Lanka in Operation Pawan. About 70,000 sorties were flown by the IAF's transport and helicopter force in support of nearly 100,000 troops and paramilitary forces without a single aircraft lost or mission aborted. IAF An-32s maintained a continuous air link between air bases in South India and Northern Sri Lanka transporting men, equipment, rations and evacuating casualties. Mi-8s supported the ground forces and also provided air transportation to the Sri Lankan civil administration during the elections. Mi-25s of No. 125 Helicopter Unit were utilised to provide suppressive fire against militant strong points and to interdict coastal and clandestine riverine traffic.

On the night of 3 November 1988, the Indian Air Force mounted special operations to airlift a parachute battalion group from Agra, non-stop over 2,000 kilometres (1,200 mi) to the remote Indian Ocean archipelago of the Maldives in response to Maldivian president Gayoom's request for military help against a mercenary invasion in Operation Cactus. The IL-76s of No. 44 Squadron landed at Hulhule at 0030 hours and the Indian paratroopers secured the airfield and restored Government rule at Male within hours. Four Mirage 2000 aircraft of 7 Sqn, led by Wg Cdr AV 'Doc' Vaidya, carried out a show of force early that morning, making low-level passes over the islands.

=== Kargil War (1999) ===
On 11 May 1999, the Indian Air Force was called in to provide close air support to the Indian Army at the height of the ongoing Kargil conflict with the use of helicopters. The IAF strike was code named Operation Safed Sagar. The first strikes were launched on 26 May, when the Indian Air Force struck infiltrator positions with fighter aircraft and helicopter gunships. The initial strikes saw MiG-27s carrying out offensive sorties, with MiG-21s and later MiG-29s providing fighter cover. The IAF also deployed its radars and the MiG-29 fighters in vast numbers to keep check on Pakistani military movements across the border. Srinagar Airport was at this time closed to civilian air-traffic and dedicated to the Indian Air Force.

On 27 May, the Indian Air Force suffered its first fatality when it lost a MiG-21 and a MiG-27 in quick succession. The following day, while on an offensive sortie, a Mi-17 was shot down by three Stinger missiles and lost its entire crew of four. Following these losses the IAF immediately withdrew helicopters from offensive roles as a measure against the threat of Man-portable air-defence systems (MANPAD). On 30 May, the Mirage 2000s were introduced in offensive capability, as they were deemed better in performance under the high-altitude conditions of the conflict zone. Mirage 2000s were not only better equipped to counter the MANPAD threat compared to the MiGs, but also gave IAF the ability to carry out aerial raids at night. The MiG-29s were used extensively to provide fighter escort to the Mirage 2000. Radar transmissions of Pakistani F-16s were picked up repeatedly, but these aircraft stayed away. The Mirages successfully targeted enemy camps and logistic bases in Kargil and severely disrupted their supply lines. Mirage 2000s were used for strikes on Muntho Dhalo and the heavily defended Tiger Hill and paved the way for their early recapture. At the height of the conflict, the IAF was conducting over forty sorties daily over the Kargil region. By 26 July, the Indian forces had successfully repulsed the Pakistani forces from Kargil.

==== Post Kargil incidents ====
Since the late 1990s, the Indian Air Force has been modernising its fleet to counter challenges in the new century. The fleet size of the IAF has decreased to 33 squadrons during this period because of the retirement of older aircraft. Still, India maintains the fourth largest air force in the world. The IAF plans to raise its strength to 42 squadrons. Self-reliance is the main aim that is being pursued by the defence research and manufacturing agencies.

On 10 August 1999, IAF MiG-21s intercepted a Pakistan Navy Breguet Atlantique which was flying over Sir Creek, a disputed territory. The aircraft was shot down killing all 16 Pakistani Navy personnel on board. India claimed that the Atlantic was on a mission to gather information on IAF air defence, a charge emphatically rejected by Pakistan which argued that the unarmed aircraft was on a training mission.

On 7 June 2002, a PAF F-16B Block 15 (S. No. 82-605) shot down an IAF Searcher II reconnaissance drone, using an AIM-9L Sidewinder missile, during a night interception near Lahore. On 2 August 2002, the Indian Air Force bombed Pakistani posts along the Line of Control in the Kel sector, following inputs about Pakistani military buildup near the sector.

On 20 August 2013, the Indian Air Force created a world record by performing the highest landing of a C-130J at the Daulat Beg Oldi airstrip in Ladakh at the height of 5,065 metres (16,617 ft). The medium-lift aircraft will be used to deliver troops, supplies and improve communication networks. The aircraft belonged to the Veiled Vipers squadron based at Hindon Air Force Station.

On 13 July 2014, two MiG-21s were sent from Jodhpur Air Base to investigate a Turkish Airlines aircraft over Jaisalmer when it repeated an identification code, provided by another commercial passenger plane that had already entered Indian airspace before it. The flights were on their way to Mumbai and Delhi, and the planes were later allowed to proceed after their credentials were verified.

=== 2019 Balakot airstrike ===
Following heightened tensions between India and Pakistan after the 2019 Pulwama attack that was carried out by Jaish-e-Mohammed (JeM) which killed forty servicemen of the Central Reserve Police Force, a group of twelve Mirage 2000 fighter planes from the Indian Air Force carried out air strikes on alleged JeM bases in Chakothi and Muzaffarabad in the Pakistan-administered Kashmir. Furthermore, the Mirage 2000s targeted an alleged JeM training camp in Balakot, a town in the Pakistani province of Khyber Pakhtunkhwa. Pakistan claimed that the Indian aircraft had only dropped bombs in the forest area demolishing pine trees near the Jaba village which is 19 kilometres (12 mi) away from Balakot and Indian officials claimed to bomb and kill a large number of terrorists in the airstrike.

==== 2019 India–Pakistan standoff ====
On 27 February 2019, in retaliation for the IAF bombing of an alleged terrorist hideout in Balakot, a group of PAF Mirage-5 and JF-17 fighters allegedly conducted an airstrike against certain ground targets across the Line of Control. They were intercepted by a group of IAF fighters consisting of Su-30MKI and MiG-21 jets. An ensuing dogfight began. According to India, one PAF F-16 was shot down by an IAF MiG-21 piloted by Abhinandan Varthaman, while Pakistan denied use of F-16s in the operation. According to Pakistan, a MiG-21 and a Su-30MKI were shot down, while India claims that only the MiG-21 was shot down. Indian officials rejected Pakistani claims of shooting down an Su-30MKI stating that it's impossible to hide an aircraft crash as of now in a populated area like Kashmir and said it's a coverup for the loss of F16. While the downed MiG-21's pilot had ejected successfully, he landed in Pakistan-administered Kashmir, and was captured by the Pakistan military. Before his capture he was assaulted by a few locals. After a couple of days of captivity, the captured pilot was released by Pakistan per Third Geneva convention obligations. While Pakistan denied involvement of any of its F-16 aircraft in the strike, the IAF presented remnants of AMRAAM missiles that are only carried by the F-16s within the PAF as proof of their involvement. Unnamed US officials told Foreign Policy magazine in April 2019 that an audit didn't find any Pakistani F-16s missing. However, this was not confirmed by the United States, which cited it as bilateral matter between US and Pakistan.

=== 2025 India-Pakistan conflict ===
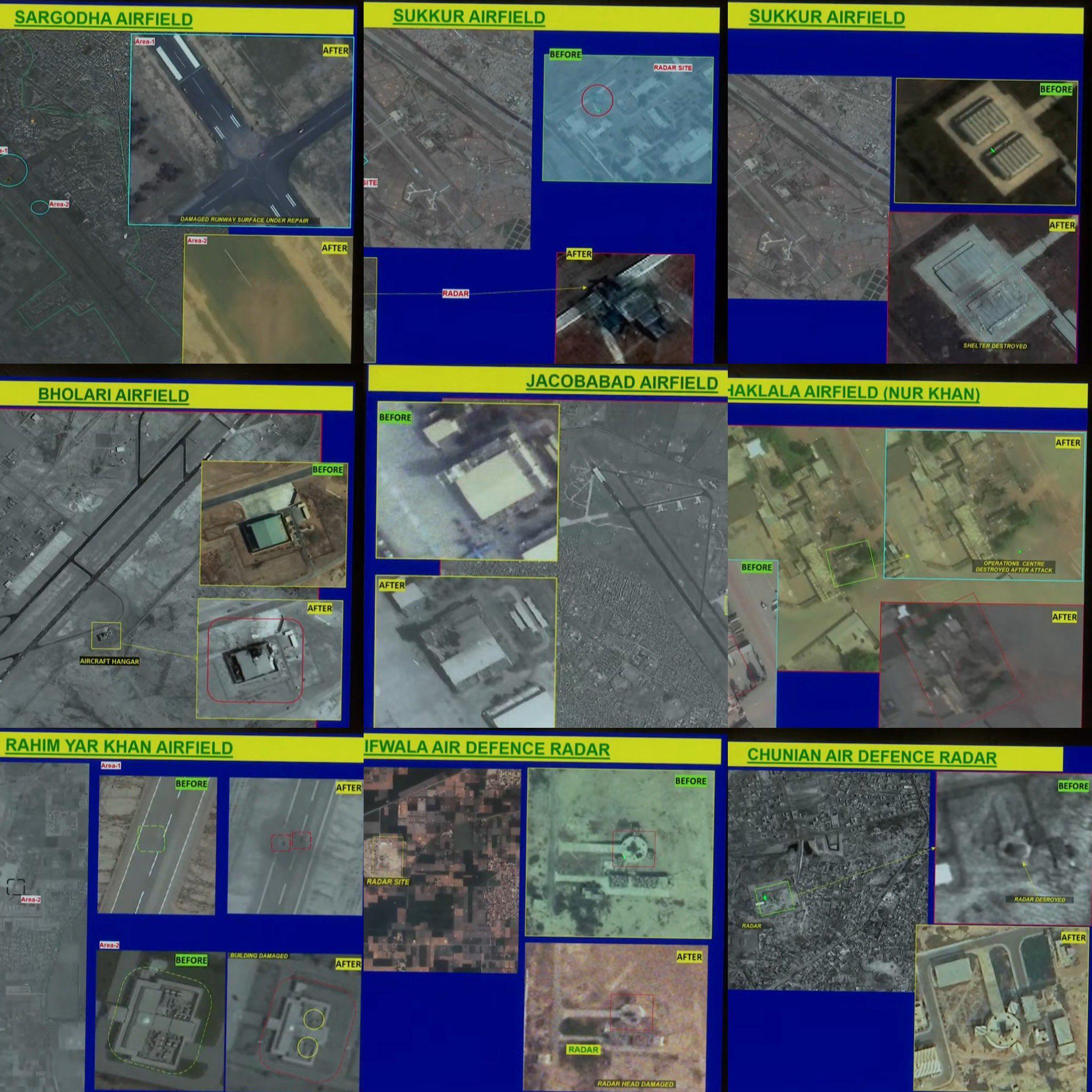
Satellite imagery of 9 out of 12 Pakistan Air Force bases neutralized by Indian Air Force led missile strikes during Operation Sindoor in 2025, making India the only nation in the world to have neutralized multiple airbases of a nuclear-armed country

On May 7, 2025, the Indian Air Force (IAF) launched Operation Sindoor, in response to the Pahalgam Attack. The operation was carefully orchestrated as a high-precision, intelligence-driven punitive strike targeting nine confirmed terrorist camps across the Line of Control and deeper within Pakistan. The IAF conducted coordinated attacks on critical targets, including the Nur Khan and Rahimyar Khan air bases, utilizing advanced indigenous platforms and the Integrated Air Command and Control System (IACCS) for real-time, multi-domain coordination. Indian fighter aircraft and loitering munitions successfully penetrated and neutralized Chinese-origin Pakistani air defense systems through strategic jamming and evasion, completing the mission within just 23 minutes. The operation also highlighted the exemplary synergy between the three services, with the Indian Army and Navy providing essential support in air defense and maritime surveillance, respectively. While full details remain limited, reports indicate that the Indian Air Force employed a combination of decoy and anti-radiation drones, such as the IAI Harop, alongside a range of long-range stand-off weapons. These included cruise missiles like the BrahMos and SCALP, as well as solid-propellant precision-guided munitions such as the Israeli-origin Crystal Maze and Rampage missiles.

The Indian Air Force's precision strikes not only reportedly "dismantled terrorist infrastructure", It delivered a "significant setback" to Pakistan's military capabilities, reportedly setting back its air power by "five years" through the destruction of radar coverage, command and control systems, and critical assets at multiple airbases. According to India, more than 100 terrorists across 9 "terror hubs", including high-value targets, were neutralized, and key Pakistani military installations were rendered inoperable. Throughout the campaign, Indian forces maintained strict rules of engagement, initially focusing exclusively on terrorist-linked infrastructure and avoiding escalation, which underscored the nation's commitment to strategic restraint and professionalism. The operation was recognized as a demonstration of India's growing self-reliance in defense technology and its ability to conduct complex, integrated military operations with precision and discipline, thereby altering the regional security landscape in India's favor.

In the early hours of May 10, India carried out further coordinated airstrikes on at least eleven sites across Pakistan, beginning with airbases at Nur Khan (near Rawalpindi), Rafiqui, Rahim Yar Khan, and Sukkur, followed by strikes on Sarghoda, Bholari, and Jacobabad airbases, as well as command, control, and drone-related targets at Murid, and radar sites at Chunian, Arifwala, and Pasrur. At certain bases, including Sarghoda and Rahim Yar Khan, the Indian Air Force cratered runways to temporarily disable flight operations. The strikes were described by Indian officials as a swift and calibrated response to sustained Pakistani drone attacks.

On 9 August 2025, Indian Air Chief Marshal Amar Preet Singh stated that a large aircraft had been shot down at a distance of 300 km in May, along with five other fighter aircraft. He attributed most of these to the S-400 missile system. During a lecture in Bengaluru, he described the 300 km engagement as the "longest recorded surface-to-air kill" that could be publicly acknowledged. A senior IAF official noted that such long-range engagements are rarely confirmed due to classification and verification challenges, but in this instance, radar and electronic tracking reportedly confirmed the target's destruction. According to an Austrian aerial warfare analyst Tom Cooper, the aircraft destroyed in the process might have been a SAAB 2000, referring to its military variant with the Erieye system. Group Captain Animesh Patni was reportedly awarded the Vir Chakra for executing the 314-km surface-to-air missile strike.

==== Expert Analyses ====
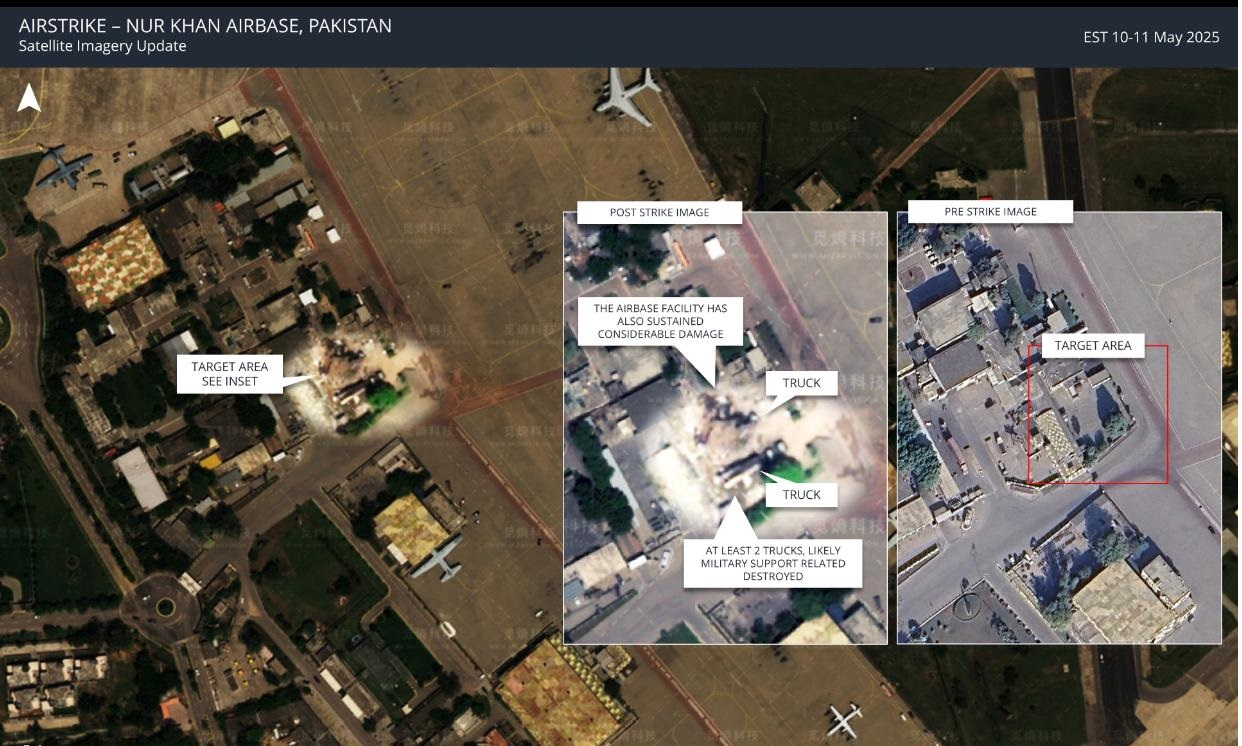
Nur Khan Airbase in Pakistan, Damaged by the Indian Air Force in 2025

Austrian air-warfare analyst Tom Cooper opined that India's Operation Sindoor gave it a clear military edge over Pakistan. He cited the May 10 airstrikes on the PAF Mushaf Airbase, which likely blocked access to a nuclear weapons facility, showcasing India's precision and exposing Pakistan's security gaps. In another interview, he declared India as a "clear winner" in the air battle against Pakistan. Later in August, while he endorsed Air Chief Marshal Singh's claim that six Pakistani aircraft were shot down by the IAF, he added that even more aircraft were destroyed on the ground.

Walter Ladwig of the Royal United Services Institute described the operation as a precise, disciplined strike on terrorist targets that avoided escalation. He noted it marked a shift toward expected cross-border retaliation and said restraint by both sides may signal more stable crisis management under nuclear conditions.

Former US Air Force pilot Ryan Bodenheimer called the X-Guard decoy system used by India a major leap in electronic warfare, calling it "the best spoofing we’ve ever seen." Trailing Rafales, the AI-powered decoys reportedly confused Pakistani defenses. Business Today, citing Jane’s Defence Weekly, suggested some claimed Rafale kills may have actually been hits on these decoys.

India's defense attaché to Indonesia, Captain Shiva Kumar, said Indian forces shifted strategy after May 7 by targeting Pakistani military sites. He noted that suppression and destruction of enemy air defenses (SEAD and DEAD) enabled effective missile strikes, leading to "complete air superiority" from May 8 to 10. Tommy Tamtomo, vice chairman of the Indonesia Center of Air Power Studies, stated at a seminar in Jakarta that the Pakistan Air Force (PAF) had lost six fighter jets, two Airborne Warning and Control Systems (AWACS) aircraft, and a military transport plane during the conflict.

At a Royal Thai Air Force (RTAF) conference, senior officials praised India's operations as a milestone in modern air warfare. RTAF Deputy Chief of Air Staff (Intelligence), Air Marshal Sommai Leelitham, highlighted the Indian Air Force's (IAF) precise, loss-free strikes on multiple Pakistani Air Force bases. The RTAF report noted India's three-phase approach using dummy aircraft, loitering munitions, and precision missile strikes from Rafale, Mirage 2000, and Su-30MKI jets.

== Structure ==
The President of India is the Supreme Commander of all Indian armed forces and by virtue of that fact is the national Commander-in-chief of the Air Force. The Chief of the Air Staff with the rank of Air chief marshal is the Commander

| Post | Current Holder |
|---|---|
| Chief of the Air Staff | Air Chief Marshal Ashutosh Dixit, PVSM, AVSM, VM, VSM |
| Vice Chief of the Air Staff | Air Marshal Inderpal Singh Walia, AVSM, VM |
| Deputy Chief of the Air Staff | Air Marshal Tejpal Singh, AVSM, VM |
| Air Officer in Charge Personnel | Air Marshal Hardeep Bains, AVSM, VM |
| Air Officer in Charge Administration | Air Marshal S Sivakumar, VSM |
| Director General of Inspection and Flight Safety | Air Marshal Tejbir Singh, AVSM, VM |
| Air Officer in Charge Maintenance | Air Marshal K A A Sanjeeb, AVSM, VSM |
| Director General of Air Operations | Air Marshal Joseph Suares, YSM, VM |
| Director General of Medical Services (Air) | Air Marshal Vivek Hande, AVSM, VSM |

In January 2002, the government conferred the rank of Marshal of the Indian Air Force on Arjan Singh making him the first and only Five-star officer with the Indian Air Force and ceremonial chief of the air force.

=== Commands ===
The Indian Air Force is divided into five operational and two functional commands. Each Command is headed by an Air Officer Commanding-in-Chief with the rank of Air Marshal. The purpose of an operational command is to conduct military operations using aircraft within its area of responsibility, whereas the responsibility of functional commands is to maintain combat readiness. Aside from the Training Command at Bangalore, the primary flight training is done at the Air Force Academy (located in Hyderabad), followed by operational training at various other schools. Advanced officer training for command positions is also conducted at the Defence Services Staff College; specialised advanced flight training schools are located at Bidar, Karnataka and Hakimpet, Telangana (also the location for helicopter training).

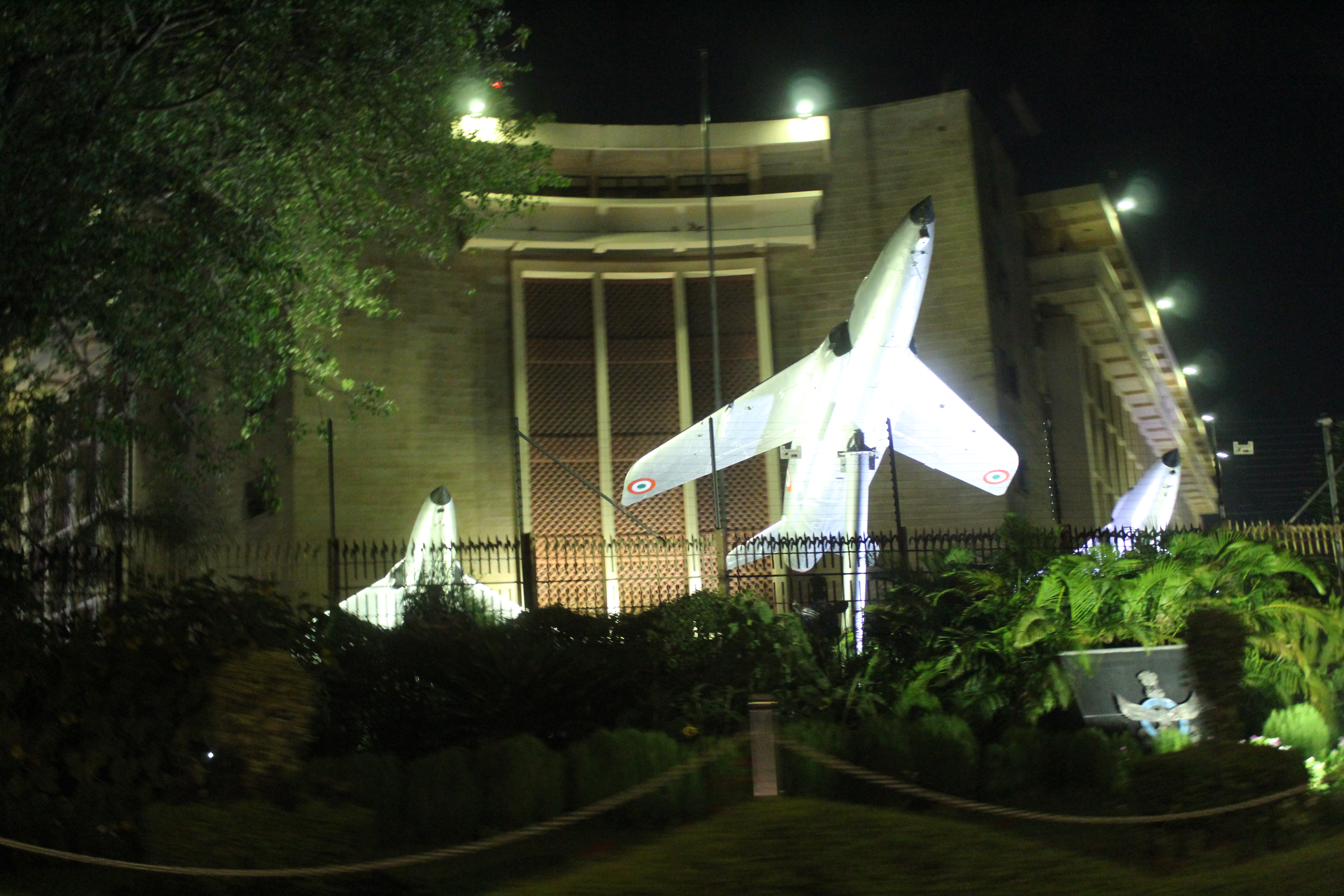
Air Headquarters Vayu Bhawan, New Delhi

| Name | Headquarters | Commander |
|---|---|---|
| Central Air Command (CAC) | Prayagraj, Uttar Pradesh | Air Marshal Tarun Chaudhry, AVSM, VM |
| Eastern Air Command (EAC) | Shillong, Meghalaya | Air Marshal Mehtab Singh Deswal, AVSM, VM |
| Southern Air Command (SAC) | Thiruvananthapuram, Kerala | Air Marshal Jasvir Singh Mann, AVSM, VM |
| South Western Air Command (SWAC) | Gandhinagar, Gujarat | Air Marshal P. V. Shivanand, AVSM, VM |
| Western Air Command (WAC) | New Delhi | Air Marshal George Thomas, AVSM, VM |
| Training Command (TC)+ | Bengaluru, Karnataka | Air Marshal Seethepalli Shrinivas, PVSM, AVSM, VSM |
| Maintenance Command (MC)+ | Nagpur, Maharashtra | Air Marshal Yalla Umesh, VSM |

Note: + = Functional Command

=== Wings ===
A wing is a formation intermediate between a command and a squadron. It generally consists of two or three IAF squadrons and helicopter units, along with forward base support units (FBSU). FBSUs do not have or host any squadrons or helicopter units but act as transit airbases for routine operations. In times of war, they can become fully fledged air bases playing host to various squadrons. In all, about 47 wings and 19 FBSUs make up the IAF. Wings are typically commanded by an air commodore.

=== Stations ===
Within each operational command are anywhere from nine to sixteen bases or stations. Smaller than wings, but similarly organised, stations are static units commanded by a group captain. A station typically has one wing and one or two squadrons assigned to it.

=== Squadrons and units ===
Squadrons are the field units and formations attached to static locations. Thus, a flying squadron or unit is a sub-unit of an air force station which carries out the primary task of the IAF. A fighter squadron consists of 18 aircraft; all fighter squadrons are headed by a commanding officer with the rank of wing commander. Some transport squadrons and helicopter units are headed by a commanding officer with the rank of group captain.

=== Flights ===
Flights are sub-divisions of squadrons, commanded by a squadron leader. Each flight consists of two sections.

=== Sections ===
The smallest unit is the section, led by a flight lieutenant. Each section consists of three aircraft.

Within this formation structure, IAF has several service branches for day-to-day operations. They are:

Flying Branch
- Flying

Technical Branch
- Engineering

Ground Branch
- Logistics
- Administration
- Accounts
- Education
- Medical & Dental
- Meteorological

=== Garud Commando Force ===
The Garud commandos are the special forces of the Indian Air Force (IAF). Their tasks include counter-terrorism, hostage rescue, providing security to IAF's vulnerably located assets and various air force-specific special operations. First conceived in 2002, this unit was officially established on 6 February 2004.

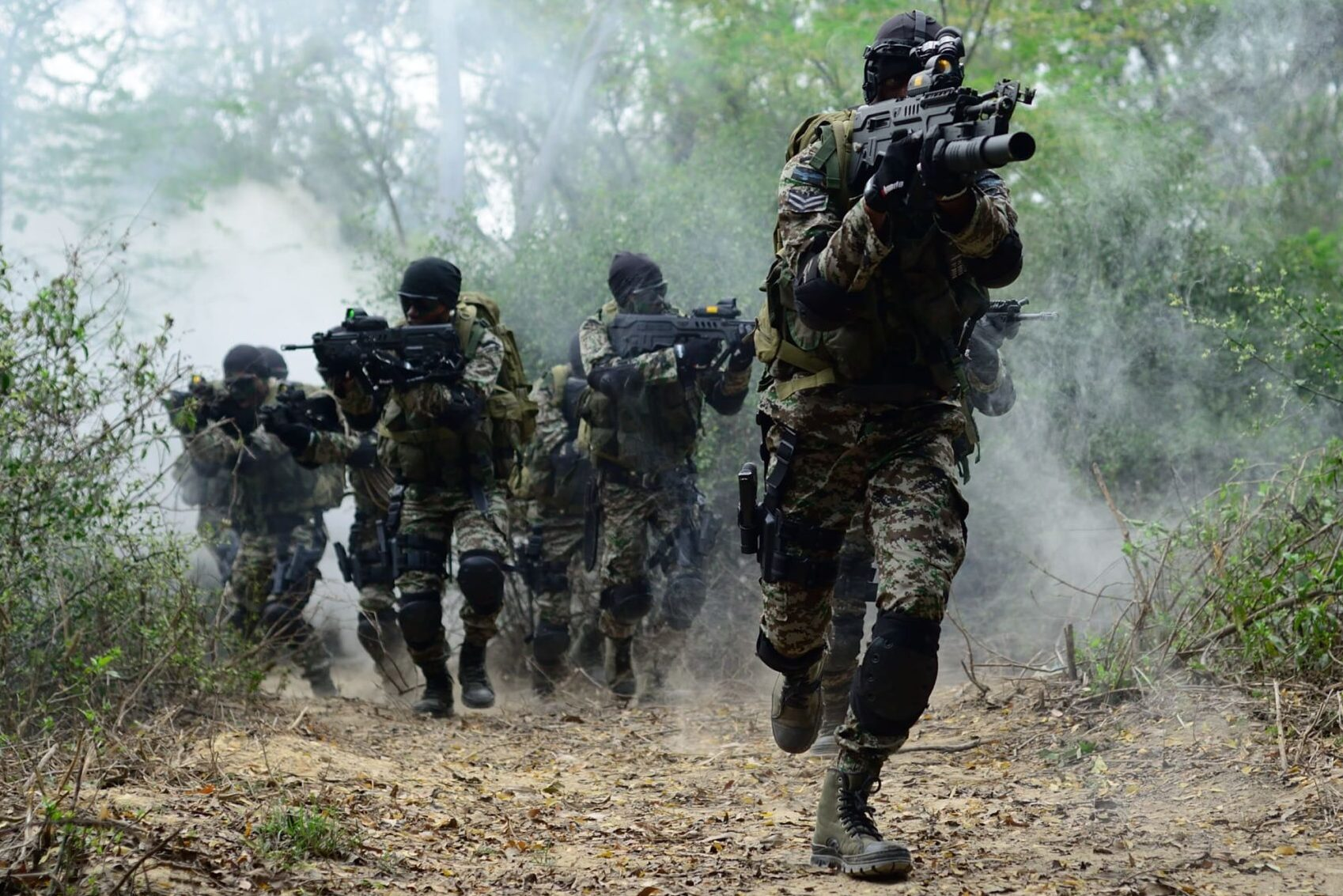
Garud Commandos

Garud Insignia

All Garuds are volunteers who are imparted a 52-week basic training, which includes a three-month probation followed by special operations training, basic airborne training and other warfare and survival skills. The last phase of basic training sees Garuds been deployed to get combat experience. Advanced training follows, which includes specialised weapons training.

The mandated tasks of the Garuds include direct action, special reconnaissance, rescuing downed pilots in hostile territory, establishing airbases in hostile territory and providing air-traffic control to these airbases. The Garuds also undertake suppression of enemy air defences and the destruction of other enemy assets such as radars, evaluation of the outcomes of Indian airstrikes and use laser designators to guide Indian airstrikes.

The security of IAF installations and assets are usually performed by the Air Force Police and the Defence Security Corps even though some critical assets are protected by the Garuds.

=== Defence Space Agency ===
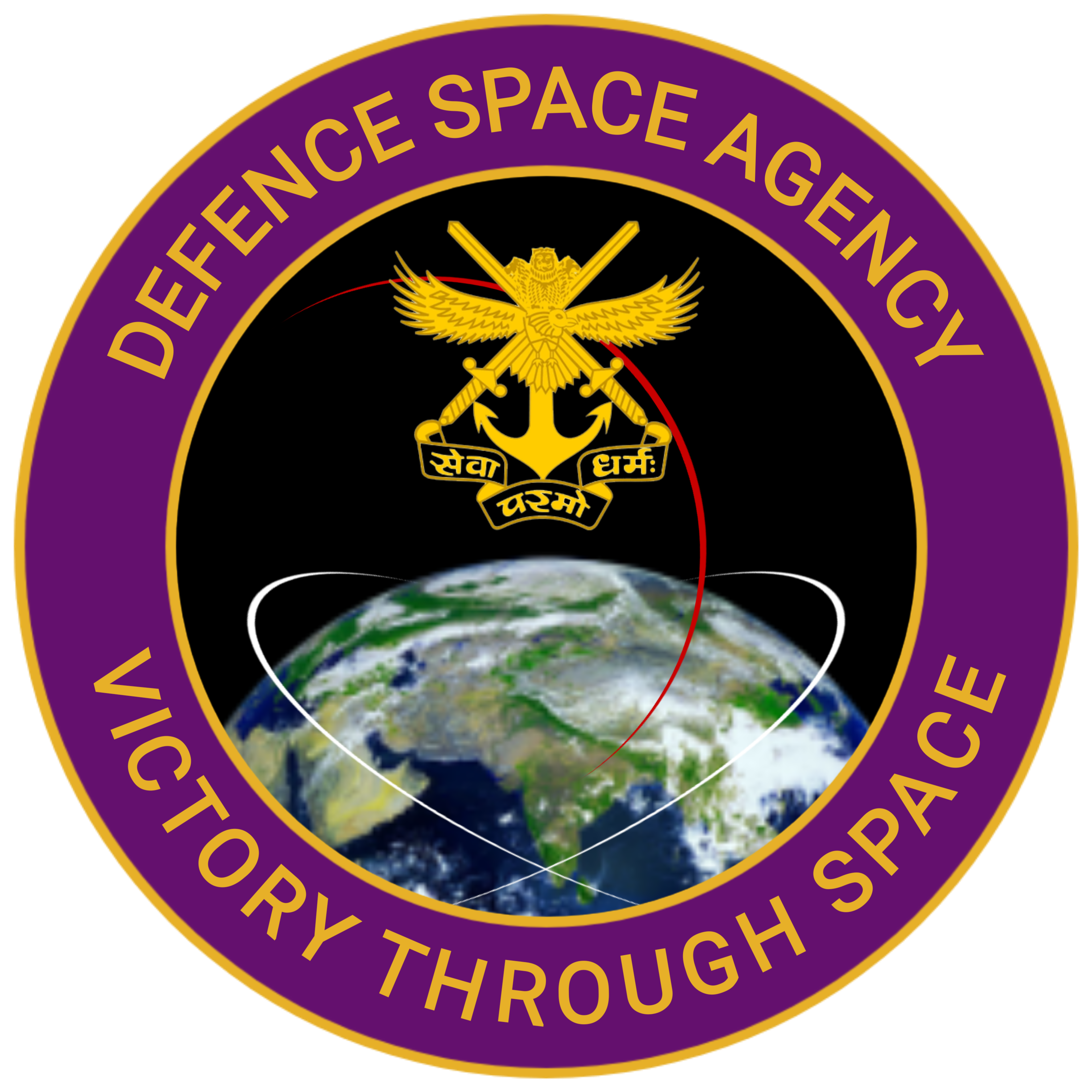
Defence Space Agency Insignia

The Defence Space Agency, an integrated tri-services agency, which draws its personnel from all the three services of the Indian armed forces, is set up to operate the space-warfare and Satellite Intelligence assets of India.

Unlike an aerospace command, where the air force controls most of its activities, the Defence Space Agency envisages co-operation and co-ordination between the three services as well as civilian agencies dealing with space.

India currently has 10 military satellites.

=== Display teams ===
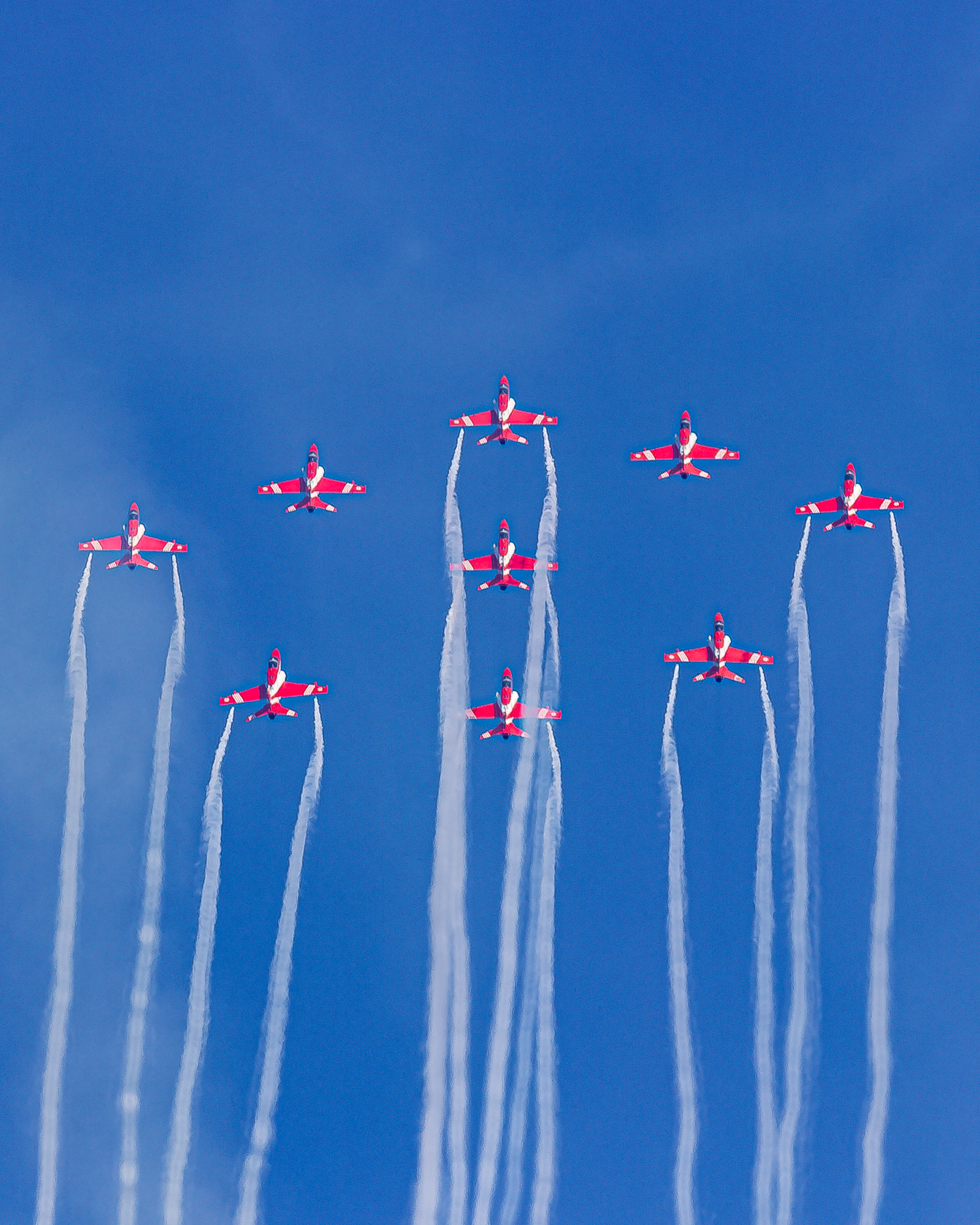
The Suryakiran Aerobatic team in their Diamond Formation.

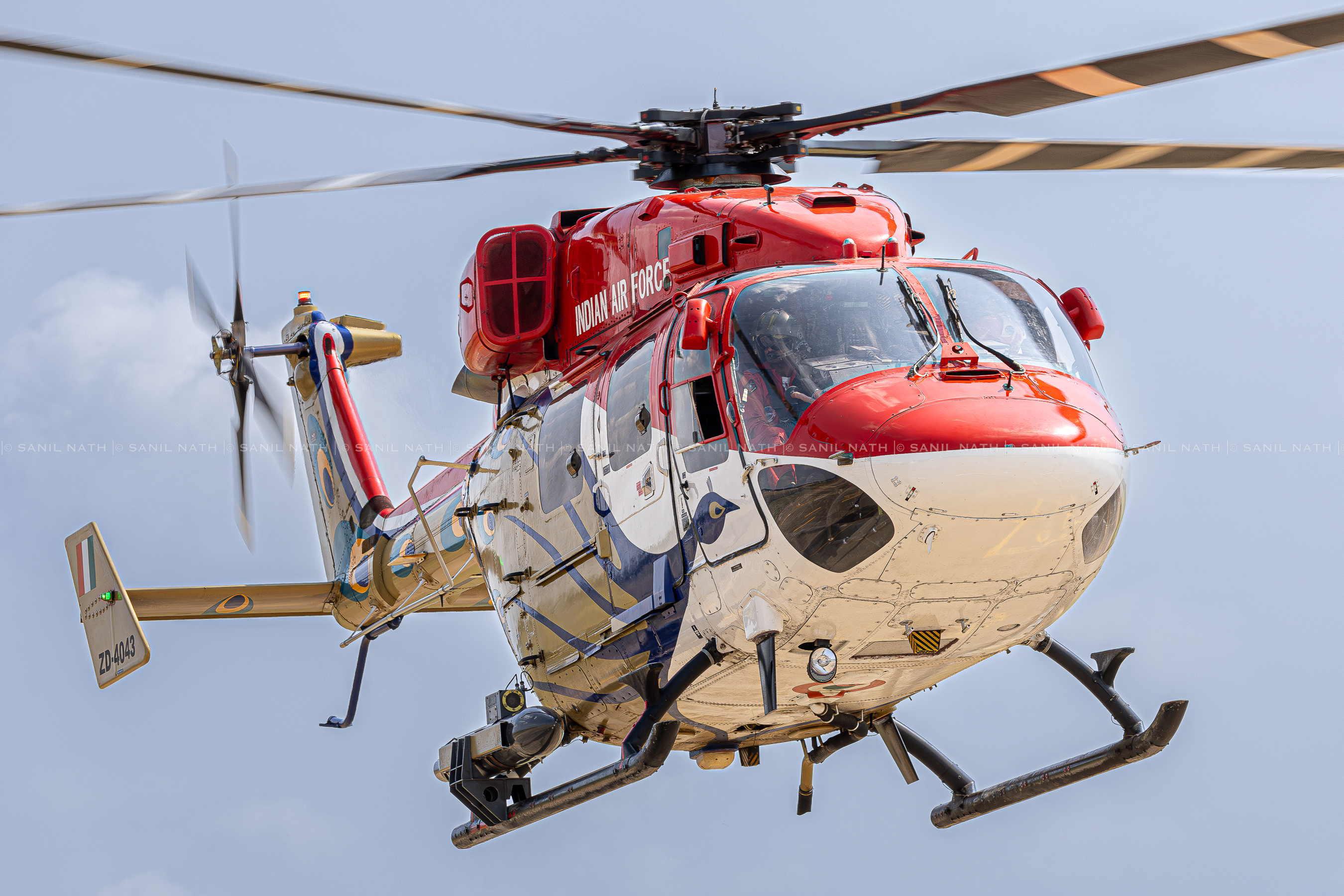
A solo HAL Dhruv Mk.1 of the Sarang Helicopter Display team coming in for landing after a display.

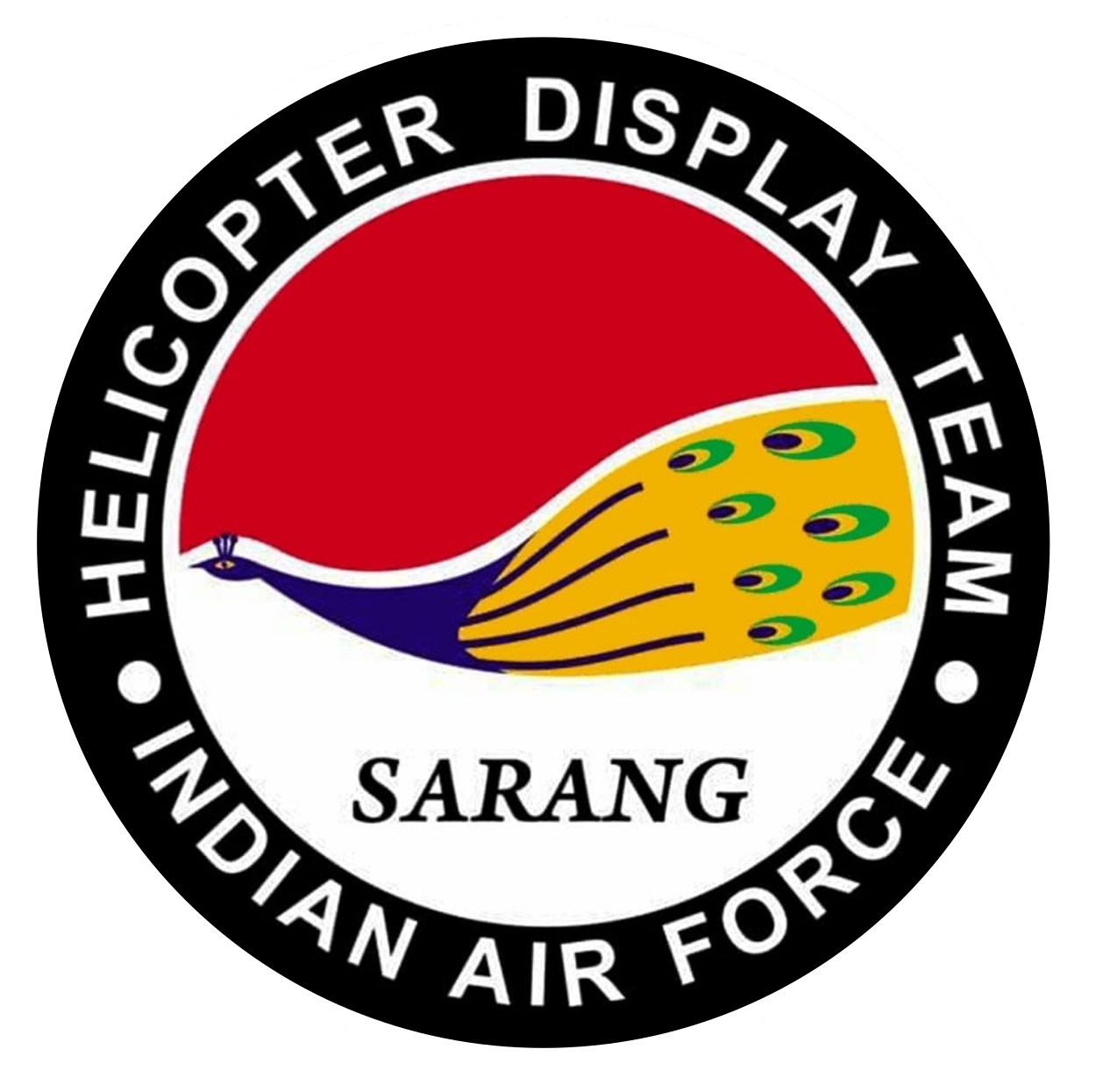

The Surya Kiran Aerobatic Team (SKAT) (Surya Kiran is Sanskrit for Sun Rays) is an aerobatics demonstration team of the Indian Air Force. They were formed in 1996 and are successors to the Thunderbolts. The team has a total of 13 pilots (selected from the fighter stream of the IAF) and operate 9 Bae Hawk mk.132 painted in a "day-glo orange" and white colour scheme. The Surya Kiran team were conferred squadron status in 2006, and presently have the designation of 52 Squadron ("The Sharks"). The team is based at the Indian Air Force Station at Bidar. The team earlier used to fly HAL HJT-16 Kiran.

Sarang (Sanskrit for Peacock) is the Helicopter Display Team of the Indian Air Force. The team was formed in October 2003 and their first public performance was at the Asian Aerospace Show, Singapore, 2004. The team earlier used to fly four HAL Dhruvs but that was upgraded to five on the 91st Air Force day held in Prayagraj. The choppers are painted in red and white with a peacock figure at each side of the fuselage. The team is based at the Sulur Air Force Station, Coimbatore.

== Personnel ==
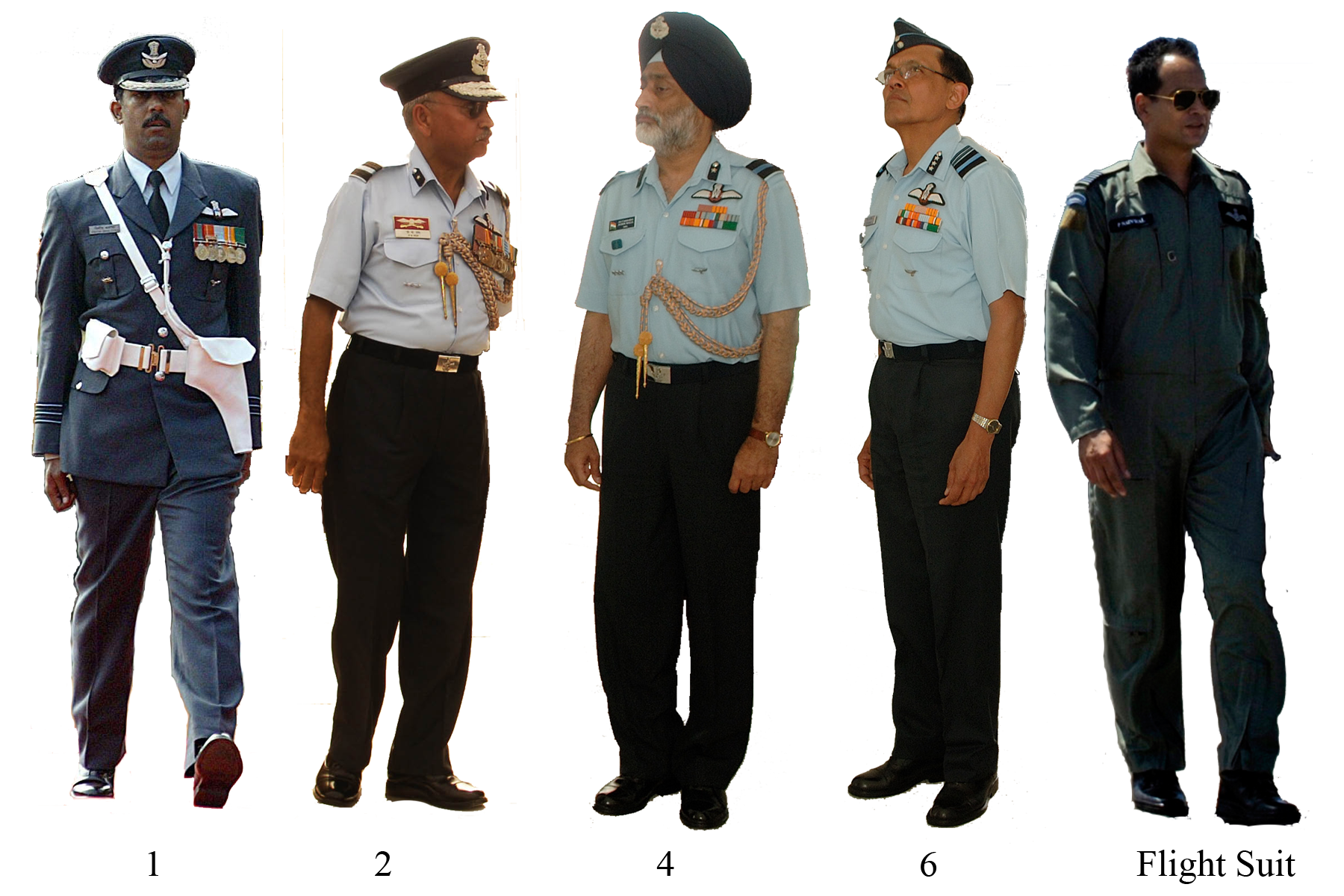
IAF officers in uniform

In 2017, there was a shortage of 15,503 personnel out of an authorized strength of 155,000.

In mid-2019, the air force had 12,142 officers out of an authorized strength of 12,625, and 129,094 enlisted personnel out of an authorized 142,917.

Personnel strength on 1 March 2022 was 138,994 enlisted and 12,143 officers.

IAF officer strength on 1 March 2022 by rank (not including Armed Forces Medical Services)
| Pay level | Rank | Strength |
|---|---|---|
| 18 | Air Chief Marshal | 1 |
| 17/16/15 | Air Marshal | 27 |
| 14 | Air Vice Marshal | 75 |
| 13A | Air Commodore | 222 |
| 13 | Group Captain | 1019 |
| 12A | Wing Commander | 4934 |
| 11 | Squadron Leader | 3822 |
| 10B | Flight Lieutenant | 1258 |
| 10 | Flying Officer | 785 |
| Total | | 12143 |

IAF enlisted strength on 1 March 2022 by rank
| Pay level | Rank | Strength |
|---|---|---|
| 8 | MWO | 2698 |
| 7 | WO | 5420 |
| 6 | JWO | 9873 |
| 5 | SGT | 46037 |
| 4 | CPL | 49127 |
| 3 | LAC | 23134 |
| 3 | AC | 2705 |
| Total | | 138994 |

Strength of the Indian Air Force on 1 March 2022
1. Officers 12,143 (8.03%)
2. Personnel below officer rank 138,994 (92.0%)

In 2025, the International Institute for Strategic Studies (IISS) listed active personnel strength at 149,900.

=== Rank structure ===
The rank structure of the Indian Air Force is based on that of the Royal Air Force. The highest rank attainable in the IAF is Marshal of the Indian Air Force, conferred by the President of India after exceptional service during wartime. MIAF Arjan Singh is the only officer to have achieved this rank. The head of the Indian Air Force is the Chief of the Air Staff, who holds the rank of Air Chief Marshal.

==== Officers ====
Anyone holding Indian citizenship can apply to be an officer in the Air Force as long as they satisfy the eligibility criteria. There are four entry points to become an officer. Male applicants, who are between the ages of 16 1/2 and 19 and have passed high school graduation, can apply at the Intermediate level. Men and women applicants, who have graduated from college (three-year course) and are between the ages of 18 and 28, can apply at the Graduate level entry. Graduates of engineering colleges can apply at the Engineer level if they are between the ages of 18 and 28 years. The age limit for the flying and ground duty branch is 23 years of age and for technical branch is 28 years of age. After completing a master's degree, men and women between the ages of 18 and 28 years can apply at the Post Graduate level. Post graduate applicants do not qualify for the flying branch. For the technical branch the age limit is 28 years and for the ground duty branch it is 25. At the time of application, all applicants below 25 years of age must be single. The IAF selects candidates for officer training from these applicants. After completion of training, a candidate is commissioned as a Flying Officer.

Equivalent ranks of Indian military
| Commission | Indian Navy | Indian Army | Indian Air Force |
|---|---|---|---|
| Commissioned | Admiral of the fleet | Field marshal | Marshal of the Indian Air Force |
| Commissioned | Admiral | General | Air chief marshal |
| Commissioned | Vice admiral | Lieutenant general | Air marshal |
| Commissioned | Rear admiral | Major general | Air vice marshal |
| Commissioned | Commodore | Brigadier | Air commodore |
| Commissioned | Captain | Colonel | Group captain |
| Commissioned | Commander | Lieutenant colonel | Wing commander |
| Commissioned | Lieutenant commander | Major | Squadron leader |
| Commissioned | Lieutenant | Captain | Flight lieutenant |
| Commissioned | Sub lieutenant | Lieutenant | Flying officer |
| Junior commissioned | Master chief petty officer 1st class | Subedar major (Note: Risaldar major in cavalry and armoured regiments) | Master warrant officer |
| Junior commissioned | Master chief petty officer 2nd class | Subedar (Note: Risaldar in cavalry and armoured regiments) | Warrant officer |
| Junior commissioned | Chief petty officer | Naib subedar (Note: Naib risaldar in cavalry and armoured regiments. Called jemadar until 1965.) | Junior warrant officer |
| Non-commissioned | Petty officer | Havildar/Daffadar | Sergeant |
| Non-commissioned | Leading seaman | Naik/Lance daffadar | Corporal |
| Non-commissioned | Seaman 1 | Lance naik/Acting Lance-Daffadar | Leading aircraftsman |
| Non-commissioned | Seaman 2 | Sepoy/Sowar | Aircraftsman |

| Rank group | General / flag officers | | | | | Senior officers | | | Junior officers |
|---|---|---|---|---|---|---|---|---|---|---|
| Indian Air Force |
| Indian Air Force | Marshal of the Indian Air Force मार्शल ऑफ द इंडियन एयरफोर्स | Air chief marshal एयर चीफ मार्शल | Air marshal एयर मार्शल | Air vice marshal एयर वाइस मार्शल | Air commodore एयर कमोडोर | Group captain ग्रुप कैप्टन | Wing commander विंग कमांडर | Squadron leader स्क्वाड्रन लीडर | Flight lieutenant फ्लाइट लैफ्टिनेंट | Flying officer फ्लाइंग अफसर |

==== Airmen ====
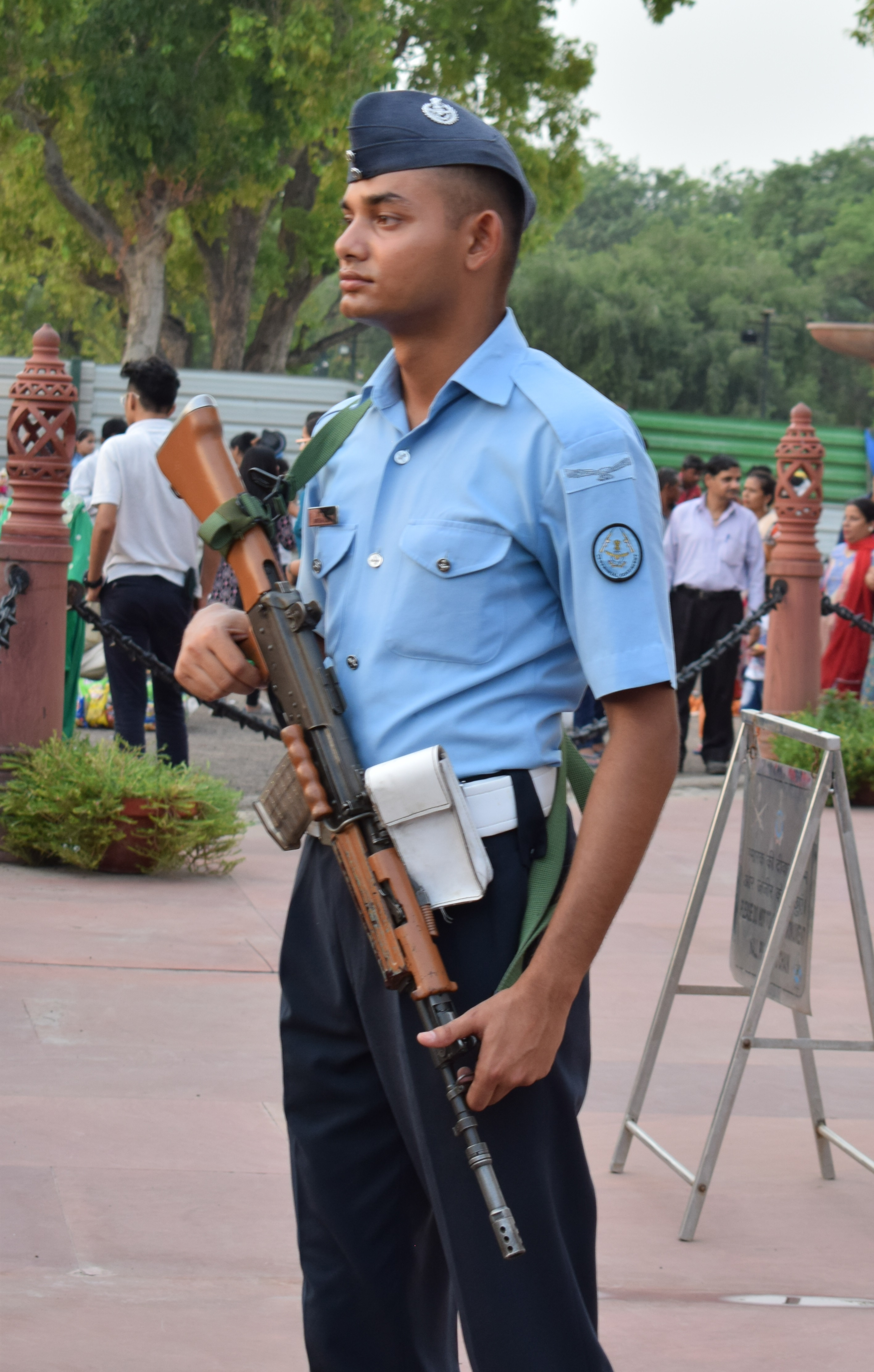
An IAF servicemember with uniform, shoulder rank patch and INSAS rifle standing guard at the India Gate memorial in New Delhi

The duty of an airman is to make sure that all the air and ground operations run smoothly. From operating Air Defence systems to fitting missiles, they are involved in all activities of an air base and give support to various technical and non-technical jobs. The airmen of Technical trades are responsible for maintenance, repair and prepare for use the propulsion system of aircraft and other airborne weapon delivery system, Radar, Voice/Data transmission and reception equipment, latest airborne weapon delivery systems, all types of light, mechanical, hydraulic, pneumatic systems of airborne missiles, aero engines, aircraft fuelling equipment and heavy duty mechanical vehicles, cranes and loading equipment etc. The competent and qualified airmen from technical trades also participate in flying as flight engineers, Flight Signallers and Flight Gunners. The recruitment of personnel below officer rank is conducted through All India Selection Tests and Recruitment Rallies. All India Selection Tests are conducted among 15 Airmen Selection Centres (ASCs) located all over India. These centres are under the direct functional control of Central Airmen Selection Board (CASB), with administrative control and support by respective commands. The role of CASB is to carry out selection and enrolment of airmen from the Airmen Selection Centres for their respective commands. Candidates initially take a written test at the time of application. Those passing the written test undergo a physical fitness test, an interview conducted in English, and medical examination. Candidates for training are selected from individuals passing the battery of tests, on the basis of their performance. Upon completion of training, an individual becomes an airman. Some MWOs and WOs are granted honorary commission in the last year of their service as an honorary Flying Officer or Flight Lieutenant before retiring from the service.

| Rank group | Junior commissioned officers | | | Non commissioned officer | | | Enlisted |
|---|---|---|---|---|---|---|---|
| Indian Air Force | | | | | | | No insignia |
| Indian Air Force | Master warrant officer मास्टर वारंट अफसर | Warrant officer वारंट अफसर | Junior warrant officer जूनियर वारंट अफसर | Sergeant सार्जेंट | Corporal कॉरपोरल | Leading aircraftsman लीडिंग एयरक्राफ्ट्समैन | Aircraftsman एयरक्राफ्ट्समैन |

=== Honorary officers ===
Sachin Tendulkar was the first sportsperson and the first civilian without an aviation background to be awarded the honorary rank of group captain by the Indian Air Force.

=== Non combatants enrolled and civilians ===
Non combatants enrolled (NCs(E)) were established in British India as personal assistants to the officer class, and are equivalent to the orderly or sahayak of the Indian Army.

Almost all the commands have some percentage of civilian strength which are central government employees. These are regular ranks which are prevalent in ministries. They are usually not posted outside their stations and are employed in administrative and non-technical work.

=== Training and education ===
The Indian Armed Forces have set up numerous military academies across India for training its personnel, such as the National Defence Academy (NDA). Besides the tri-service institutions, the Indian Air Force has a Training Command and several training establishments. While technical and other support staff are trained at various Ground Training Schools, the pilots are trained at the Air Force Academy, Dundigul (located in Hyderabad). The Pilot Training Establishment at Allahabad, the Air Force Administrative College at Coimbatore, the Institute of Aerospace Medicine at Bangalore, the Air Force Technical College, Bangalore at Jalahalli, the Tactics and Air Combat and Defence Establishment at Gwalior, and the Paratrooper's Training School at Agra are some of the other training establishments of the IAF.

== Aircraft inventory ==
The Indian Air Force has aircraft and equipment of Russian (erstwhile Soviet Union), British, French, Israeli, US and Indian origins with Russian aircraft dominating its inventory. HAL produces some of the Russian and British aircraft in India under licence. The exact number of aircraft in service with the Indian Air Force cannot be determined with precision from open sources. Various reliable sources provide notably divergent estimates for a variety of high-visibility aircraft. In 2025, IISS estimated that the IAF had approximately 1750 aircraft, including 721 combat capable fixed-wing aircraft.

=== Multi-role fighters and strike aircraft ===
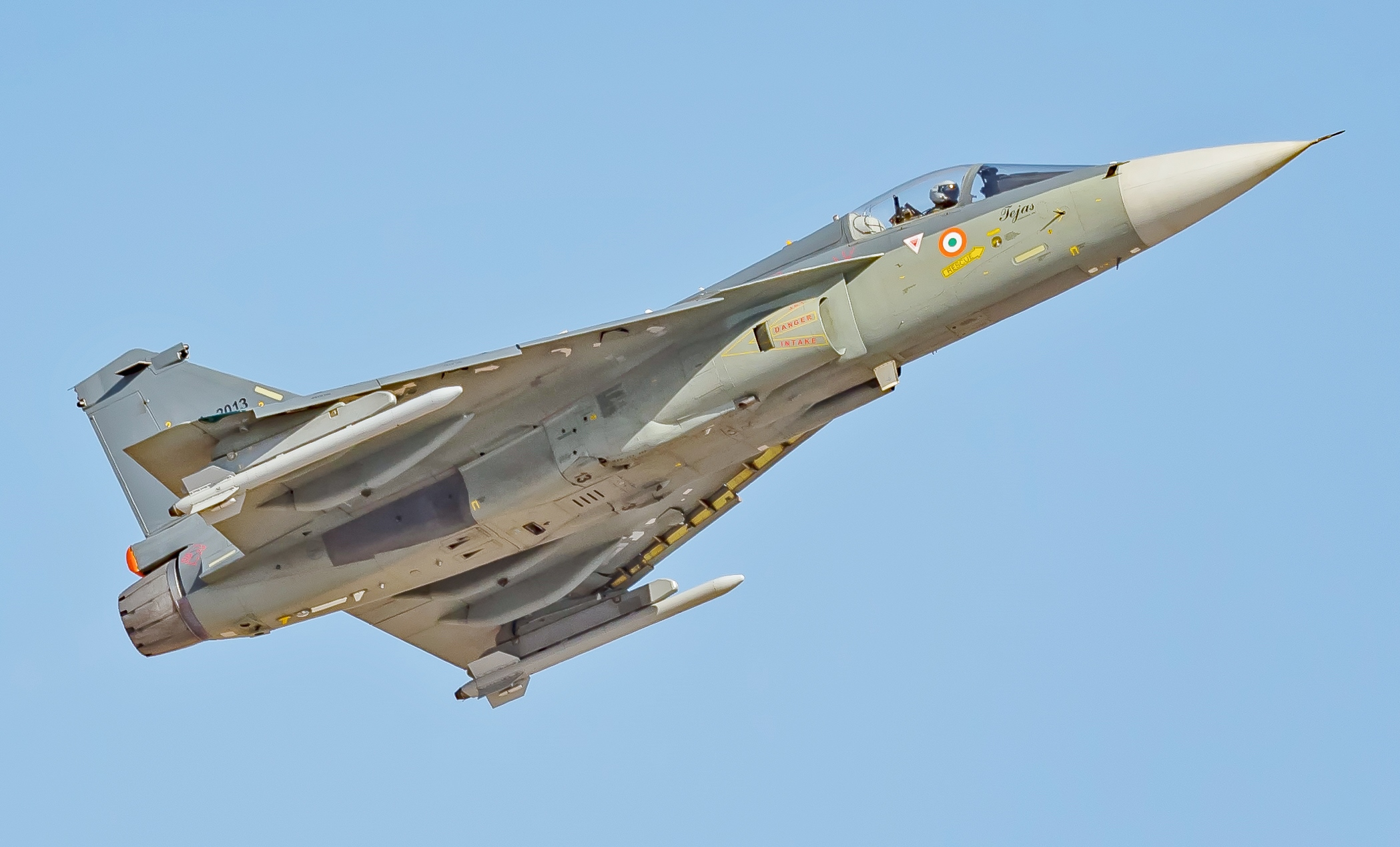
HAL Tejas

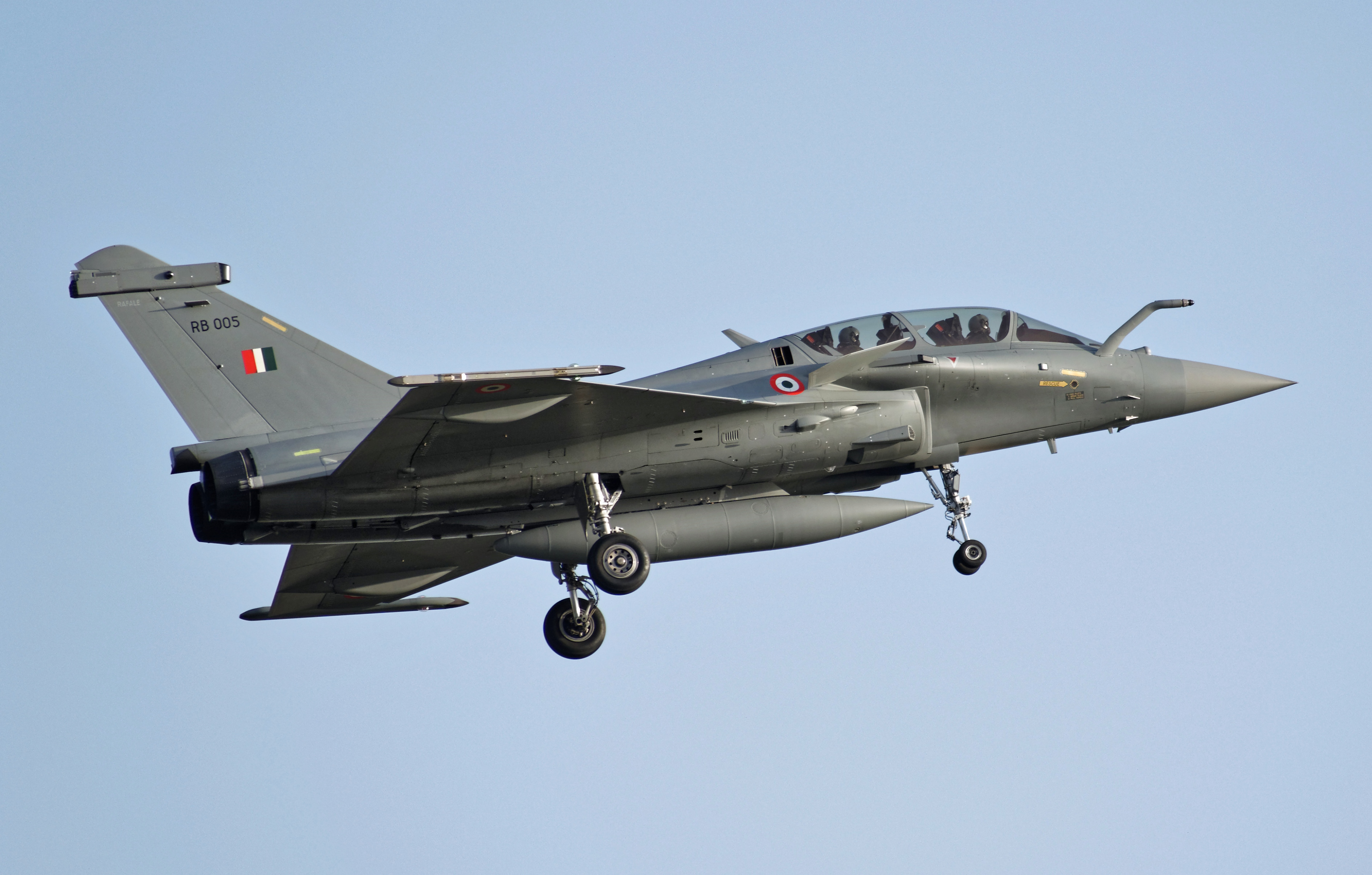
Dassault Rafale

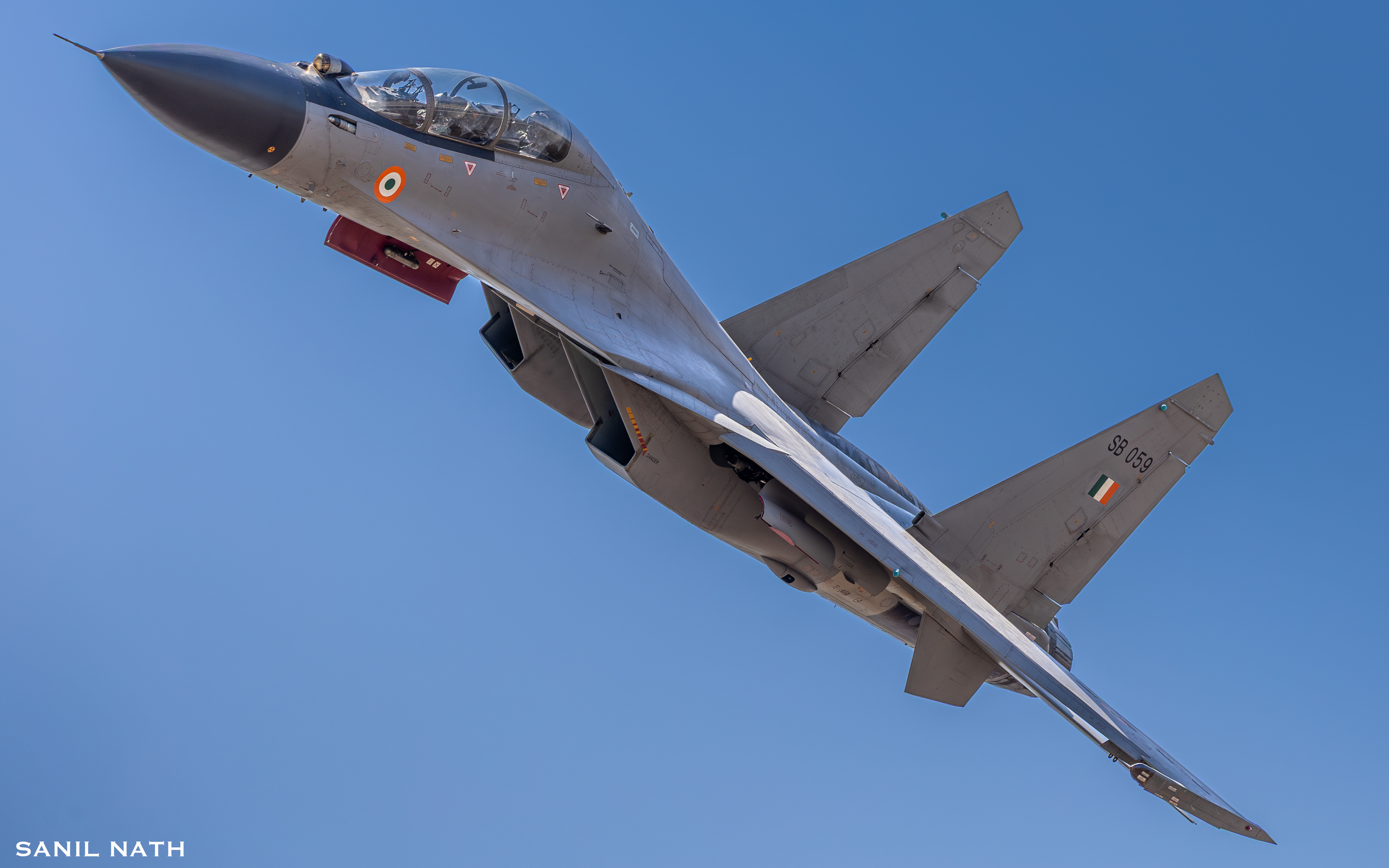
Sukhoi Su-30MKI

The Indian Air Force has been reported to have a shortage of combat aircraft count. As of April 2026, the IAF has 29 combat squadrons as against a sanctioned strength of 42 squadrons. This strength is on par with the IAF's fighter fleet during the Indo-Pakistani war of 1965. The squadron strength of the IAF had peaked in 1996 at 41 squadrons but dwindled gradually to 35 units in 2013 and to 31 in 2025. In response, the Ministry of Defence appointed a five-member Empowered Committee for Capability Enhancement of IAF which analysed and reported the "key thrust areas and recommendations" necessary for "achieving the desired capability enhancement goals" to the Ministry.

- Dassault Rafale: the latest addition to India's aircraft arsenal; India has signed a deal for 36 Dassault Rafale multirole fighter aircraft. As of June 2022, 36 Rafale fighters are in service with the Indian Air Force.
- HAL Tejas: IAF MiG-21s are to be replaced by domestically built HAL Tejas. The first Tejas IAF unit, No. 45 Squadron IAF Flying Daggers, was formed on 1 July 2016, followed by No. 18 Squadron IAF "Flying Bullets" on 27 May 2020. Initially stationed at Bangalore, the first squadron was then to be transferred to its home base in Sulur, Tamil Nadu. In February 2021, the Indian Air Force ordered 83 Tejas, including 40 Mark 1, 73 single-seat Mark 1As and 10 two-seat Mark 1 trainers. Total 123 ordered.
- Sukhoi Su-30MKI: the IAF's primary air superiority fighter, with additional air-to-ground (strike) mission capability, is the Sukhoi Su-30MKI. 260 Su-30MKIs are in service.
- Mikoyan MiG-29: the MiG-29, known as Baaz (Hindi for Hawk), is a dedicated air superiority fighter, constituting the IAF's second line of defence after the Su-30MKI. There are 69 MiG-29s in service, all of which have been recently upgraded to the MiG-29UPG standard, after the decision was made in 2016 to upgrade the remaining 21 MiG-29s to the UPG standard.
- Dassault Mirage 2000: the Mirage 2000, known as Vajra (Sanskrit for diamond or thunderbolt) in Indian service. The IAF currently operates 49 Mirage 2000Hs and 8 Mirage 2000 TH all of which are currently being upgraded to the Mirage 2000-5 MK2 standard with Indian specific modifications and 2 Mirage 2000-5 MK2 are in service as of March 2015. The IAF's Mirage 2000 were scheduled to be phased out by 2030.
- SEPECAT Jaguar: the Jaguar, known as the Shamsher, serves as the IAF's primary ground attack force. The IAF currently operates 139 Jaguars. The first batch of DARIN-1 Jaguars are now going through a DARIN-3 upgrade being equipped with EL/M-2052 AESA radars, and an improved jamming suite plus new avionics. These aircraft are scheduled to be phased out by 2030.

=== Airborne early warning and control system ===
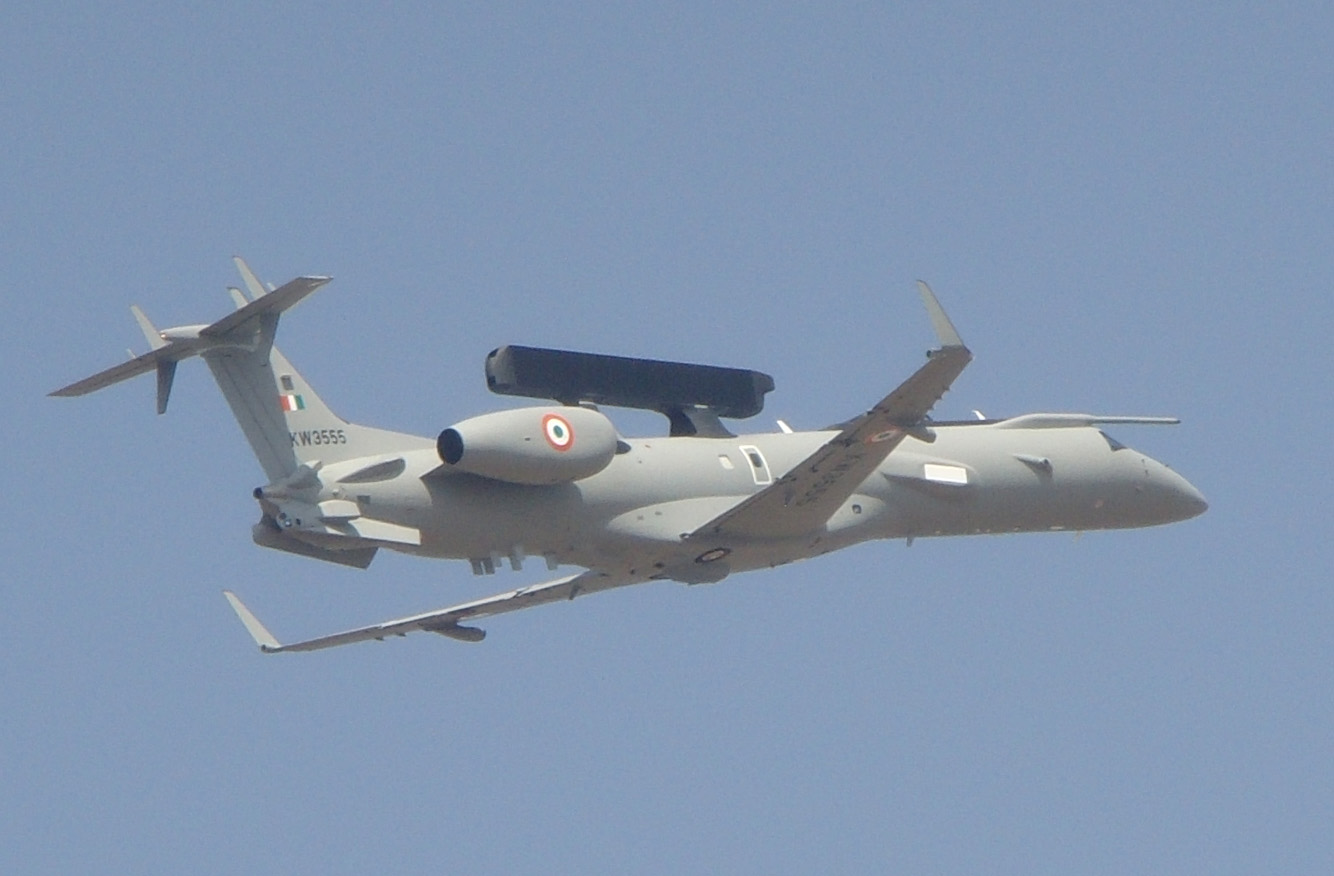
An AEW&C Embraer ERJ 145

The IAF operates three Netra Embraer ERJ 145I aircraft. The IAF also operates the EL/W-2090 Phalcon AEW&C incorporated in a Beriev A-50 platform. A total of three such systems are currently in service, with two further potential orders. India is also investing in a DRDO project to develop six new Airborne AEW&C aircraft, as an upgrade to the Netra systems.

=== Aerial refuelling ===
The IAF currently operates six Ilyushin Il-78MKIs in the aerial refueling (tanker) role.

=== Transport aircraft ===
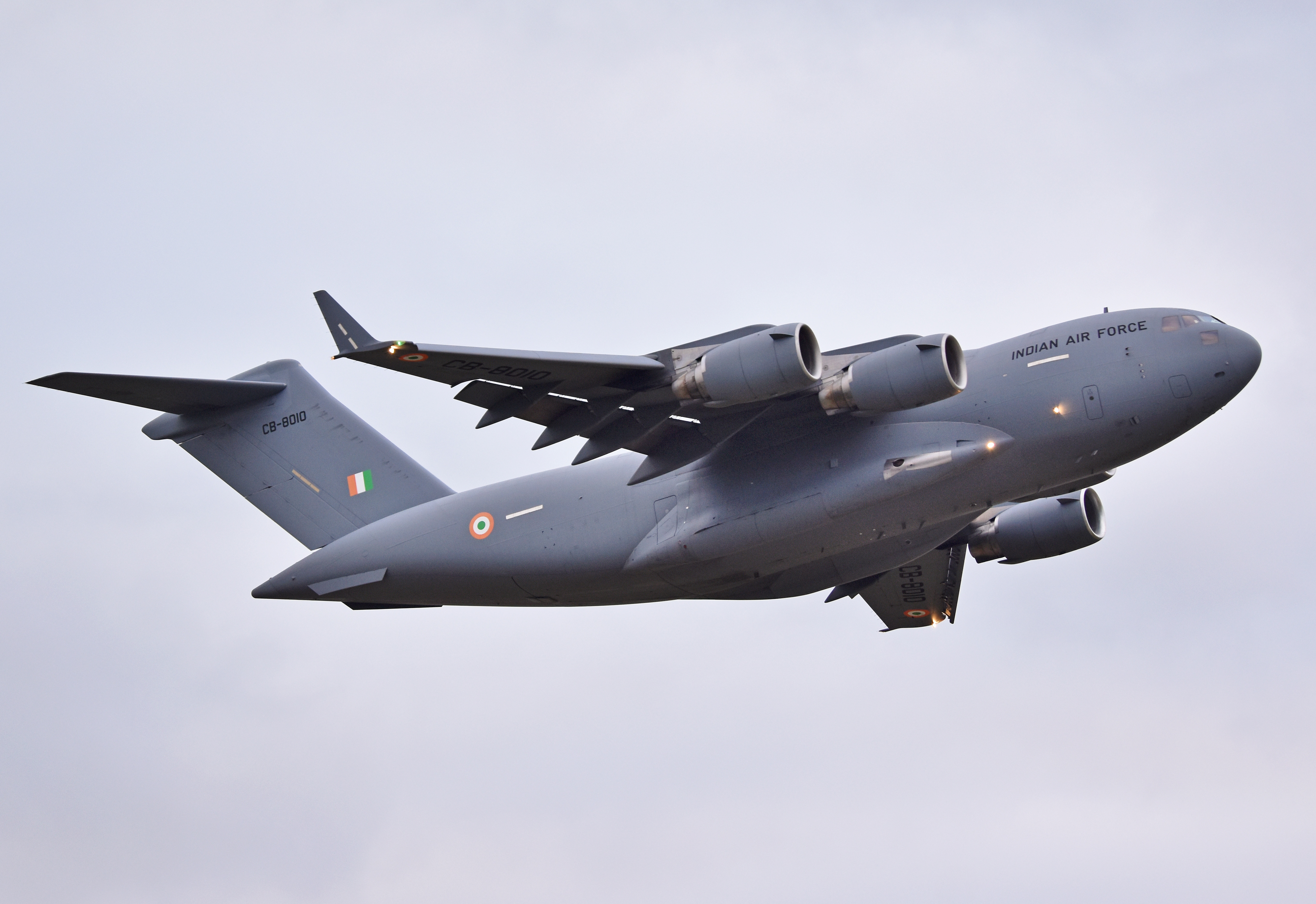
Boeing C-17 Globemaster III

For strategic airlift operations, the IAF uses the Ilyushin Il-76, known as Gajraj (Hindi for King Elephant) in Indian service. The IAF operated 17 Il-76s in 2010, which are in the process of being replaced by C-17 Globemaster IIIs.

IAF C-130Js are used by special forces for combined Army-Air Force operations. India purchased six C-130Js; however, one crashed at Gwalior on 28 March 2014 while on a training mission, killing all 5 on board and destroying the aircraft. The Antonov An-32, known in Indian service as the Sutlej (named after Sutlej River), serves as a medium transport aircraft in the IAF. The aircraft is also used in bombing roles and paradropping operations. The IAF currently operates 105 An-32s, all of which are being upgraded. The IAF operates 53 Dornier 228 to fulfil its light transport duties. The IAF also operates Boeing 737s and Embraer ECJ-135 Legacy aircraft as VIP transports and passenger airliners for troops. 2 specially modified Boeing 777 are used for both the Indian President and Prime Minister under the call sign Air India One.

The Hawker Siddeley HS 748 once formed the backbone of the IAF's transport fleet, but are now used mainly for training and communication duties. A replacement in the form of licence-built C-295 is currently being commissioned into the Air Force.

=== Trainer aircraft ===
The HPT-32, the IAF's primary basic trainer has been phased out, initially replaced by 75 Pilatus PC-7 trainers, and followed by a planned 70 HTT-40 trainers. 36 more HTT-40s are to be ordered once fleet is operational. The IAF uses the HAL HJT-16 Kiran mk.I for intermediate flight training of cadets, while the HJT-16 Kiran mk.II provides advanced flight and weapons training. The Kiran is to be replaced by the HAL HJT-36 Yashas. The BAE Hawk Mk 132 serves as an advanced jet trainer in the IAF and is progressively replacing the Kiran Mk.II. The IAF has begun the process of converting the Surya Kiran display team to Hawks. A total of 106 BAE Hawk trainers have been ordered by the IAF of which 39 have entered service as of July 2010. IAF also ordered 72 Pipistrel Virus SW 80 microlight aircraft for basic training purpose.

=== Helicopters ===
The HAL Dhruv serves primarily as a light utility helicopter in the IAF. In addition to transport and utility roles, newer Dhruvs are also used as attack helicopters. Four Dhruvs are also operated by the Indian Air Force Sarang Helicopter Display Team. The HAL Chetak is a light utility helicopter and is used primarily for training, rescue and light transport roles in the IAF. The HAL Chetak is being gradually replaced by HAL Dhruv. The HAL Cheetah is a light utility helicopter used for high altitude operations. It is used for both transport and search-and-rescue missions in the IAF.

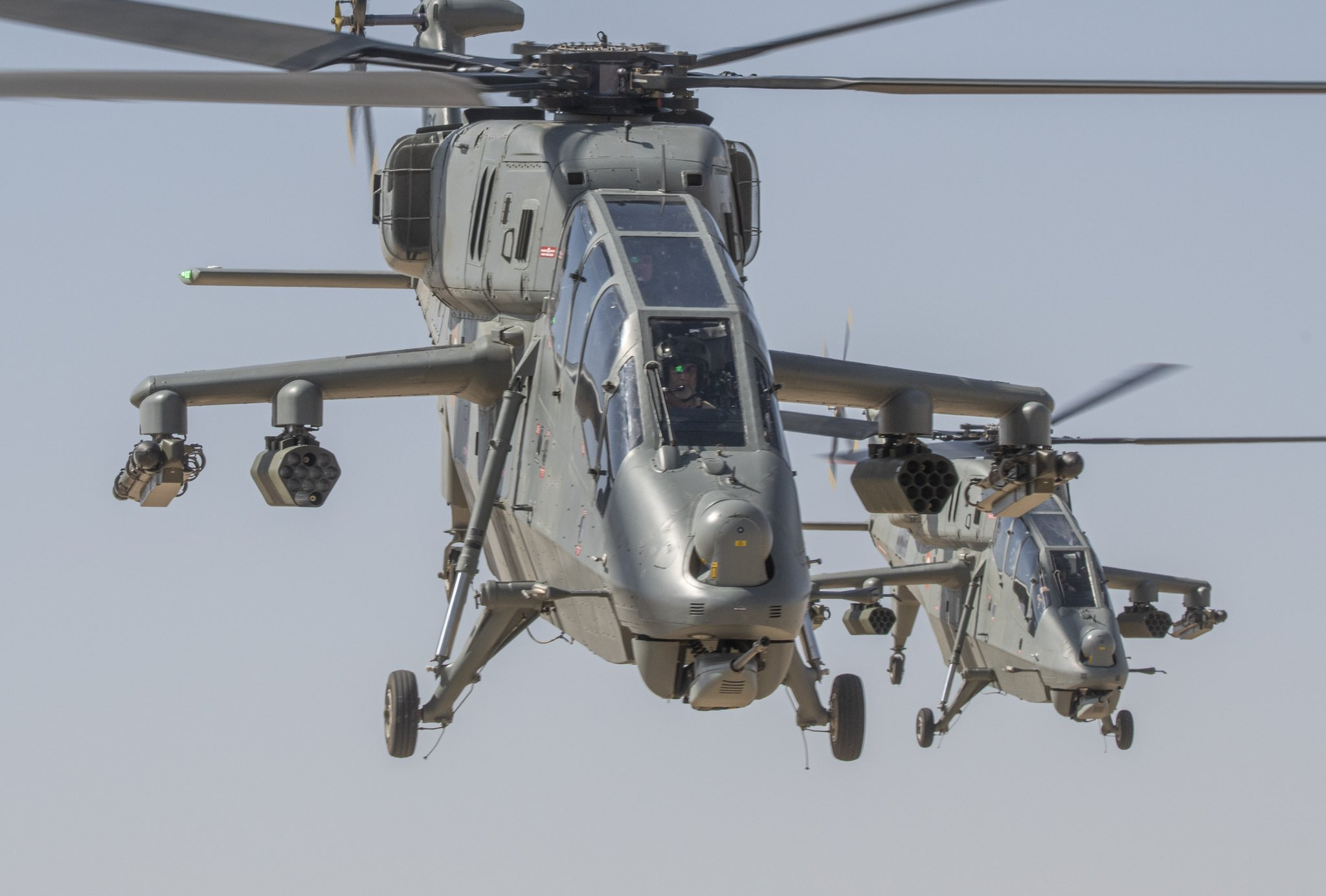
HAL Prachand armed with rockets and air to air missiles

The Mil Mi-8 and the Mil Mi-17, Mi-17 1V and Mi-17V 5 are operated by the IAF for medium lift strategic and utility roles. The Mi-8 is being progressively replaced by the Mi-17 series of helicopters. The IAF has ordered 22 Boeing AH-64E Apache attack helicopters, 68 HAL Light Combat Helicopters (LCH), 35 HAL Rudra attack helicopters, 15 CH-47F Chinook heavy lift helicopters and 150 Mi-17V-5s to replace and augment its existing fleet of Mi-8s, Mi-17s, and Mi-24s.

The Mil Mi-35 serves primarily as an attack helicopter in the IAF. The Mil Mi-35 can also act as a low-capacity troop transport. The IAF currently operates two squadrons (No. 104 Firebirds and No. 125 Gladiators) of Mi-25/35s.

=== Unmanned aerial vehicles ===
The IAF currently uses the IAI Searcher II and IAI Heron for reconnaissance and surveillance purposes. The IAI Harpy serves as an Unmanned Combat Aerial Vehicle (UCAV) which is designed to attack radar systems. The IAF also operates the DRDO Lakshya which serves as realistic towed aerial sub-targets for live fire training.

== Missile systems ==
=== Anti-tank guided missiles ===
| Name | Image | Type | Quantity | Origin | Notes |
|---|---|---|---|---|---|
| Spike NLOS | | Air launched Anti-tank guided missile | — | Israel | Status: In service. Indian Air Force procured Spike-NLOS for Mi-17 helicopters. |
| 9M120 Ataka-V (AT-9 Spiral-2) | | Air launched Anti-tank guided missile | — | Russia | Status: In service. Operated from Mil Mi-35. 20 helicopters modified to deploy the missile as of July 2024. |
| 9K114 Shturm (AT-6 Spiral) | | Air launched Anti-tank guided missile | 800 | Russia | Status: In service. Operated from Mil Mi-35 |
| Dhruvastra | | Air launched Anti-tank guided missile | — | India | Status: Completed user trials and Ready for Induction. |
| Amogha missile | | Air launched Anti-tank guided missile | — | India | Status: Under development. To be integrated on HAL Rudra and HAL Prachand. |

=== Ballistic and cruise missiles ===
| Name | Image | Type | Quantity | Origin | Notes |
|---|---|---|---|---|---|
| BrahMos | | Supersonic cruise missile Supersonic air-launched cruise missile | Unknown | India Russia | Status: In service. 450 km range. To be increased to 800 km. 40 Su-30MKI modified to operate BrahMos. Further 84 aircraft to be modified. Operates air launched and surface launched (transporter erector launcher) variants. Number of TELs with IAF is unknown. |
| Storm Shadow | | Subsonic air-launched cruise missile | Unknown | France UK | Status: In service. 550 km range |
| Kh-35 | | Subsonic air launched cruise missile | Unknown | Russia | Status: In service. 260 km range |
| Rampage | | Air-launched ballistic missile | Unknown | Israel | Status: In service. 150–250 km range. |
| Prithvi II | | Short-range ballistic missile | Unknown | India | Status: In service. 150–350 km range. IAF-specific variant of the Prithvi ballistic missile. |
| Pralay | | Short-range quasi ballistic missile | 120 on order | India | Status: Trials. 150–500 km range. |

=== Air defence systems ===
| Name | Image | Type | Quantity | Origin | Notes |
Anti-Satellite Missile Systems
| Prithvi Defence Vehicle (PDV) Mk-II | | Exo-atmospheric Anti-ballistic missile / Anti-satellite weapon | Unknown | India | Status: In service. Dual-stage solid-fueled missile with final kinetic-kill stage. Target speed: 10 km/s. Flight Altitude: 1,200 km |
Anti-Ballistic Missile Systems
| Prithvi Defence Vehicle (PDV) | | Exo-atmospheric Anti-ballistic missile | Unknown | India | Status: In service. Dual-stage solid-fueled missile. Flight Altitude: 150 km. |
| Advanced Air Defence (AAD) | | Endo-atmospheric Anti-ballistic missile | Unknown | India | Status: In service. |
| Prithvi Air Defence (PAD) | | Exo-atmospheric Anti-ballistic missile | Unknown | India | Status: being replaced by Prithvi Defence Vehicle (PDV). Dual-stage liquid-fueled missile. It can intercept targets at 80 km altitude. |
Air Defence Systems
| S-400 Triumph | | Long-range surface-to-air missile system | 3 regiments Total 48 launchers | Russia | Status: In service. 2 more regiments' delivery by 2026. 400 km operational range. Each regiment will have two batteries with eight launchers each. |
| Barak-8 (MR-SAM) | | Medium-range surface-to-air missile | 18 squadrons | India Israel | Status: In service. MRSAM is a medium range air defence system with a max range of 70–80 km. It is used to counter aerial threats such as Fighter aircraft, helicopter, UAV etc. An Air Force Squadron consists of 3 TELs per Squadron. |
| Akash | | Medium-range surface-to-air missile | 15 squadrons (120 launchers) | India | Status: In service. Akash 1S has 40 km operational range and flight ceiling of 20 km. 2 regiments of Akash Prime on order for Army. Akash NG with increased range of 70–80 km is being tested. |
| SPYDER | | Short and Medium range surface-to-air missile | 18 Systems (Batteries) | Israel | Status: In service. 18 SPYDER-SRs Systems (Batteries) along with 750 Python-5 surface to air missiles (SAMs) and 750 Derby SAMs has been delivered. 50 km operational range and flight ceiling of 16 km. A typical battery consists one central command and control unit, six missile firing units, and a resupply vehicle. |
| SAMAR | | Short-range Surface-to-air missile | Unknown (On order) | India | Status: On order. The system employs Vympel R-73 and Vympel R-27 air-to-air missiles, which are of Russian origin. User trials complete. |
| S-125 (SA-3 Goa) | | Short-range Surface-to-air missile | 25 Squadrons for IAF | USSR | Status: Being replaced by Akash. Mainly used for point-defense of airbases. Will be completely replaced by Akash NG and MRSAM by 2030 |
| 9K33 Osa (SA-8 Gecko) | | Short-range Surface-to-air missile | 80 | USSR | Status: In service (To be replaced by QRSAM) |
Man-portable air-defense systems
| 9K38 Igla (SA-18) 9K338 Igla-S | | Man-portable air-defense system | 2500 48 launchers 316 missiles | Russia | Status: In service. Igla-S deployed along LAC. Additional 96 launchers, 300 missiles of Igla-S on order. |
Air defence - anti-aircraft gun systems
| Sudarshan CIWS | | Close-in weapon system | 240 (to be ordered) | India | Status: In Service. Advanced version of Bofors L/70 manufactured by L&T Defence. System includes 3D AESA radar and has a range of 3.5 km and firing rate of 300 rounds/min. Two orders cleared: ₹6,000 crore (equivalent to ₹73 billion or US$760 million in 2026) order cleared for Indian Army in 2021.; ₹7,000 crore (equivalent to ₹75 billion or US$770 million in 2026) order cleared for 240 guns by CCS for Indian Air Force in 2024. |

== Future ==
The number of aircraft in the IAF has been decreasing from the late 1990s due to the retirement of older aircraft and several crashes. To deal with the depletion of force levels, the IAF has started to modernize its fleet. This includes both the upgrade of existing aircraft, equipment and infrastructure as well as induction of new aircraft and equipment, both indigenous and imported. As new aircraft enter service and numbers recover, the IAF plans to have a fleet of 42 squadrons.

=== Renaming ===
IAF has sent a proposal to rename itself as Indian Air and Space Force (IASF). It has declared this as a part of its current drive to become a credible space power.

=== Expected future acquisitions ===
==== Single-engined fighter ====
On 3 January 2017, Minister of Defence Manohar Parrikar addressed a media conference and announced plans for a competition to select a Strategic Partner to deliver "... 200 new single engine fighters to be made in India, which will easily cost around (USD)$45 million apiece without weaponry" with an expectation that Lockheed Martin (USA) and Saab (Sweden) will pitch the F-16 Block 70 and Gripen, respectively. An MoD official said that a global tender will be put to market in the first quarter of 2018, with a private company nominated as the strategic partners production agency followed by a two or more year process to evaluate technical and financial bids and conduct trials, before the final government-to-government deal in 2021. This represents 11 squadrons of aircraft plus several 'attrition' aircraft. India is also planning to set up an assembly line of American Lockheed Martin F-16 Fighting Falcon Block 70 in Bengaluru. It is not yet confirmed whether IAF will induct these aircraft or not.

In 2018, the defence minister Nirmala Sitharaman gave the go ahead to scale up the manufacturing of Tejas at HAL and also to export Tejas. She is quoted saying "We are not ditching the LCA. We have not gone for anything instead of Tejas. We are very confident that Tejas Mark II will be a big leap forward to fulfil the single engine fighter requirement of the forces.". IAF committed to buy 201 Mark-II variant of the Tejas taking the total order of Tejas to 324. The government also scrapped the plan to import single engine fighters leading to reduction in reliance on imports thereby strengthening the domestic defence industry.

The IAF also submitted a request for information to international suppliers for a stealth unmanned combat air vehicle (UCAV).

=== Current acquisitions ===
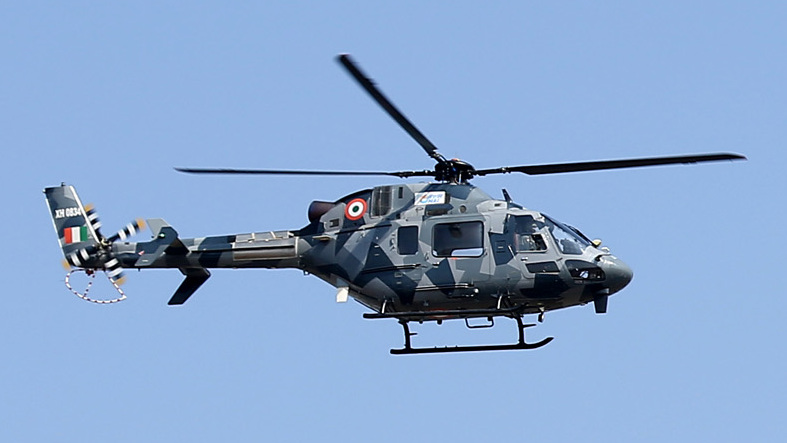
HAL LUH in IAF colors, at Aero India 2025

IAF's current orders include

- HAL Tejas - 141 Mk 1A, 10 Mk 1 trainers, 29 Mk 1A trainers on order
- HAL HTT-40: 70 on order
- HAL Prachand: 66 on order
- HAL Light Utility Helicopter (LUH): 6 on order
- EADS CASA C-295: 55 on order
- IAI Harop UCAVs
- General Atomic MQ-9B Predator: 8 on order

=== DRDO and HAL projects ===
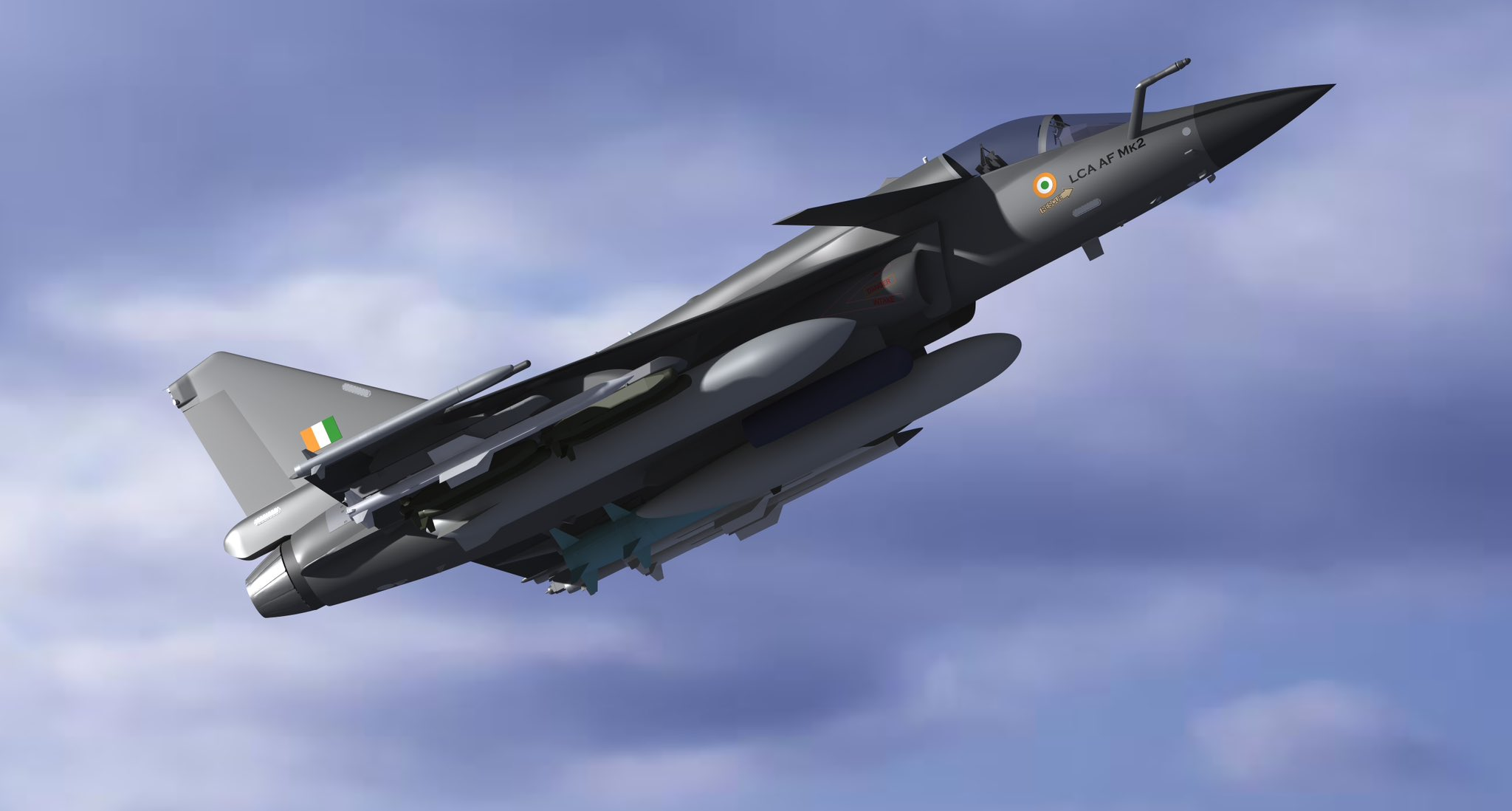
HAL Tejas Mk2, Medium Fighter Aircraft

Indian defence company HAL and Defense Research Organization DRDO are developing several aircraft for the IAF including:-

- HAL Tejas Mk 2
- HAL AMCA (5th generation aircraft)
- NAL Saras
- HAL HJT-36 Yashas
- DRDO Rustom
- TAPAS-BH-201
- DRDO Ghatak UCAV.
- HAL CATS: DRDO and HAL has also engaged in the development of unmanned combat system. According to this, HAL will develop the whole family of unmanned aircraft by the end of 2024–25
- Akash-NG to supplement Akash SAM & Barak 8.
- Nirbhay long range nuclear capable cruise missile.

=== Network-centric warfare ===
The Air Force Network (AFNET), a robust digital information grid that enabled quick and accurate threat responses, was launched in 2010, helping the IAF become a truly network-centric air force. AFNET is a secure communication network linking command and control centres with offensive aircraft, sensor platforms and ground missile batteries. Integrated Air Command and Control System (IACCS), an automated system for Air Defence operations will ride the AFNet backbone integrating ground and airborne sensors, weapon systems and command and control nodes. Subsequent integration with civil radar and other networks shall provide an integrated Air Situation Picture, and reportedly acts as a force multiplier for intelligence analysis, mission control, and support activities like maintenance and logistics. The design features multiple layers of security measures, including encryption and intrusion prevention technologies, to hinder and deter espionage efforts.

== See also ==
- Indian Air Force ranks and insignia
- List of Indian Air Force Gallantry Award winners
- List of active Indian military aircraft
- List of historical aircraft of the Indian Air Force
- List of Indian military missiles
- List of Indian military radars
- Indian Air Force Football Team

== Media ==
In the year 2005, the National Geographic Channel created a 10 part documentary series detailing out all the branches of the Indian Air Force. It was titled Mission Udaan - Inside the Indian Air Force.

In partnership with Threye, a Delhi-based game developer, The IAF launched Guardians of the Skies, a roleplaying combat game for mobile devices in 2014. The IAF would later also create a successor, titled Indian Air Force: A Cut Above, in 2019.

== Bibliography ==
- Bammi, Y.M. (2002). Kargil 1999, Impregnable Conquered. Gorkha Publishers. pp. xxviii, 558, 65, 8 p. ISBN 978-81-7525-352-0. LCCN 2003305922.
- Bajwa, Kuldip Singh (2005). The Dynamics of Soldiering. Har-Anand Publications. p. 292. ISBN 978-81-241-0940-3.
- Barua, Pradeep (2005). The State at War in South Asia. University of Nebraska Press. pp. xvi, 437. ISBN 978-0-8032-1344-9.
- Boyne, Walter J.; Fopp, Michael (2002). Air Warfare: An International Encyclopedia (Illustrated ed.). ABC-CLIO. pp. xvi, 437. ISBN 978-1-57607-345-2.
- Chadha, Vivek (2005). Low Intensity Conflicts in India (Illustrated ed.). SAGE. p. 513. ISBN 978-0-7619-3325-0.
- Coggins, Ed (2000). Wings That Stay on (Illustrated ed.). Turner Publishing Company. pp. iii, 244. ISBN 978-1-56311-568-4.
- Cordesman, Anthony H.; Kleiber, Martin (2006). The Asian Conventional Military Balance in 2006: Overview of major Asian Powers (PDF). Center for Strategic & International Studies. p. 48. Archived from the original (PDF) on 26 December 2018.
- Dixit, Jyotindra Nath (2002). India-Pakistan in War & Peace. Routledge. p. 501. ISBN 978-0-415-30472-6.
- Europa Publications (2005). Far East and Australasia 2003. Europa Publications. p. 1538. ISBN 978-1-85743-133-9.
- Ganguly, Sumit; Kapur, S. Paul (2008). Nuclear Proliferation in South Asia (illustrated ed.). Taylor & Francis. pp. xii, 251. ISBN 978-0-415-44049-3.
- Gupta, Amit (1997). Building an Arsenal: The Evolution of Regional Power Force Structures (Illustrated ed.). Greenwood Publishing Group. pp. xi, 217. ISBN 978-0-275-95787-2.
- Ives, Jack D. (2004). Himalayan Perceptions: Environmental Change and the Well-being of Mountain Peoples (Illustrated ed.). Routledge. pp. xxi, 271. ISBN 978-0-415-31798-6.
- International Institute for Strategic Studies (2002). The Military Balance 2002/2003 (Map ed.). International Institute for Strategic Studies. ISBN 978-0-19-851672-9.
- International Institute for Strategic Studies (3 February 2010). Hackett, James (ed.). The Military Balance 2010. London: Routledge. ISBN 978-1-85743-557-3.
- International Institute for Strategic Studies (2025). The Military Balance 2025. London: Routledge. ISBN 978-1-041-04967-8.
- Jones, Aubrey (1985). Britain's Economy: The Roots of Stagnation (illustrated ed.). Cambridge University Press. ISBN 978-0-521-30816-8.
- Jones, Owen Bennett (2003). Pakistan: Eye of the Storm (2, illustrated, revised ed.). Yale University Press. p. 328. ISBN 978-0-300-10147-8.
- Kainikara, Sanu (2007). Red Air: Politics in Russian Air Power. Universal Publishers. ISBN 978-1-58112-983-0.
- Kapur, S. Paul (2007). Dangerous Deterrent: Nuclear Weapons Proliferation and Conflict in South Asia (Annotated ed.). Stanford University Press. p. 280. ISBN 978-0-8047-5549-8.
- Karthikeyan, K.R.; Gupta; Sendilkumar, R.; Jaganathan, D. (2008). A Textbook of Agricultural Extension Management. Atlantic Publishers & Distributors. pp. v, 192. ISBN 978-81-269-0881-3.
- Khan, J.A. (2004). Air Power and Challenges to IAF. APH Publishing. pp. xxxii, 361. ISBN 978-81-7648-593-7.
- Lyon, Peter (2008). Conflict Between India and Pakistan: An Encyclopedia (illustrated ed.). ABC-CLIO. ISBN 978-1-57607-712-2.
- Massey, Reginald (2005). Azaadi!. Abhinav Publications. ISBN 978-81-7017-469-1.
- Pradhan, R.D. (1999). Debacle to Revival: Y.B. Chavan as Defence Minister, 1962–65. Orient Blackswan. pp. xii, 316. ISBN 978-81-250-1477-5.
- Pradhan, R. D.; Chavan, Yashwantrao Balwantrao (2007). 1965 War, the Inside Story: Defence Minister Y.B. Chavan's Diary of India-Pakistan War. Atlantic Publishers & Distributors. pp. xviii, 141. ISBN 978-81-269-0762-5.
- Praval, Karam Chand (1975). India's Paratroopers (A History of the Parachute Regiment of India). Leo Cooper, London. ISBN 978-0-85052-184-9.
- Shiva, Vandana (2005). India Divided: Diversity and Democracy Under Attack. Seven Stories Press. p. 191. ISBN 978-1-58322-540-0.
- Sisodia, N.S.; Bhaskar, Chitrapu Uday (2005). Emerging India: Security and Foreign Policy Perspectives. Bibliophile South Asia. pp. xx, 376. ISBN 978-81-86019-51-1.
- Sisson, Richard; Rose, Leo E. (1991). War and Secession: Pakistan, India, and the Creation of Bangladesh (revised ed.). University of California Press. ISBN 978-0-520-07665-5.
- Talbott, Strobe (2006). Engaging India: diplomacy, democracy, and the bomb (Illustrated ed.). Brookings Institution Press. ISBN 978-0-8157-8301-5.
- Thomas, Raju G.C. (1996). India's Security Environment: Towards the Year 2000. DIANE Publishing. pp. iv, 33. ISBN 978-1-4289-1389-9.
- Tiwary, AK, Air Vice Marshal (2012). Indian Air Force in wars. New Delhi: Lancer. ISBN 978-1-935501-33-6.
- Warikoo, K. (2009). Himalayan Frontiers of India: Historical, Geo-Political and Strategic Perspectives (Illustrated ed.). Taylor & Francis. pp. xv, 240. ISBN 978-0-415-46839-8.
- Wilson, Stewart (2002). North American F-86 SABRE (Illustrated ed.). Wilson Media Pty, Limited. p. 64. ISBN 978-1-876722-05-0.
