= Gotabaya Rajapaksa =

President of Sri Lanka from 2019 to 2022

Gotabaya Rajapaksa RWP RSP
- ගෝඨාභය රාජපක්ෂ கோட்டாபய ராஜபக்ஷ
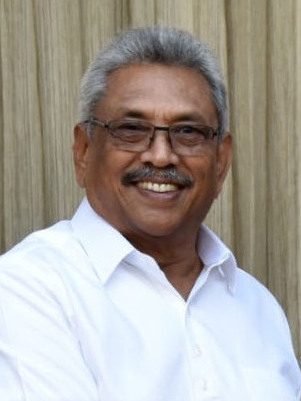
- Rajapaksa in 2019

8th President of Sri Lanka
- In office 18 November 2019 – 14 July 2022
- Prime Minister: Mahinda Rajapaksa; Ranil Wickremesinghe
- Preceded by: Maithripala Sirisena
- Succeeded by: Ranil Wickremesinghe
Cabinet positions
Minister of Defence
In office 28 November 2019 – 14 July 2022
President	Himself
Prime Minister	Mahinda Rajapaksa; Ranil Wickremesinghe
Preceded by	Maithripala Sirisena
Succeeded by	Ranil Wickremesinghe
Minister of Technology
In office 26 November 2020 – 14 July 2022
President	Himself
Prime Minister	Mahinda Rajapaksa; Ranil Wickremesinghe
Preceded by	Susil Premajayantha
Succeeded by	Ranil Wickremesinghe

Secretary to the Ministry of Defence and Urban Development
- In office 19 November 2005 – 9 January 2015
- President: Mahinda Rajapaksa
- Minister: Mahinda Rajapaksa
- Preceded by: Asoka Jayawardena
- Succeeded by: B. M. U. D. Basnayake

Personal details
- Born: Nandasena Gotabaya Rajapaksa; 20 June 1949 (age 77) Palatuwa, Dominion of Ceylon
- Citizenship: Sri Lanka (1949–2003, 2005–present); United States (2003–2019)
- Party: Sri Lanka Podujana Peramuna
- Spouse: Ayoma Rajapaksa (m. 1980)
- Children: 1
- Parent(s): Don Alwin Rajapaksa (father); Dandina Samarasinghe née Dissanayake (mother)
- Relatives: Chamal (brother); Mahinda (brother); Basil (brother)
- Education: Sri Lanka Military Academy; University of Colombo
- Website: gota.lk

Military service
- Allegiance: Sri Lanka
- Branch/service: Sri Lanka Army
- Years of service: 1971–1991
- Rank: Lieutenant Colonel
- Unit: Gajaba Regiment
- Commands: 1st Gajaba Regiment; General Sir John Kotelawala Defence Academy
- Battles/wars: Sri Lankan Civil War; 1987–1989 JVP insurrection
- Awards: Rana Wickrama Padakkama; Rana Sura Padakkama

Nandasena Gotabaya Rajapaksa RWP, RSP (Sinhala: නන්දසේන ගෝඨාභය රාජපක්ෂ; Tamil: நந்தசேன கோட்டாபய ராஜபக்ஷ; born 20 June 1949) is a Sri Lankan former politician and retired military officer who served as the eighth president of Sri Lanka from 18 November 2019 until his resignation on 14 July 2022. Before his presidency, he served as Secretary to the Ministry of Defence and Urban Development from 2005 to 2015 during the regime of his brother, president Mahinda Rajapaksa, playing a central role in the final phase of the Sri Lankan civil war.

Born to a political family from the Southern Province, Rajapaksa was educated at Ananda College, Colombo and joined the Ceylon Army in April 1971. Following basic training at the Army Training Centre, Diyatalawa, he was commissioned as signals officer and later transferred to several infantry regiments. He saw active service in the early stages of the Sri Lankan Civil War with the elite Gajaba Regiment, taking part in several major offensives such as the Vadamarachi Operation, Operation Strike Hard and Operation Thrividha Balaya, as well as counterinsurgency operations during the 1987–1989 JVP insurrection. As Defence Secretary, he oversaw the military defeat of the Liberation Tigers of Tamil Eelam in 2009. He was a target of an assassination attempt in December 2006 by a Tamil Tiger suicide bomber.

After stepping down in 2015 following his brother's electoral defeat, Rajapaksa returned to politics and ran for presidency in 2019 as a candidate of the Sri Lanka Podujana Peramuna. Campaigning on a nationalistic and security-heavy platform, he became the first Sri Lankan president with a military background and no prior elected office experience.

During his presidency, Sri Lanka faced the COVID-19 pandemic and subsequently experienced a severe economic crisis, including shortages of essential goods, high inflation and difficulties servicing its external debt. In April 2022, the government announced that Sri Lanka would suspend payments on its external debt, and the country subsequently defaulted. The economic crisis contributed to widespread protests, known as the Aragalaya, which called for the resignation of the president and government. The government's response included declarations of a state of emergency, curfews and the deployment of security forces. Human rights organizations and other observers reported cases of excessive use of force, arrests of protesters and restrictions on freedom of expression during the protests. The protests ultimately led to Rajapaksa's resignation in July 2022, making him the first Sri Lankan president to resign before completing his term.

== Early life and education ==
Nandasena Gotabaya Rajapaksa was born in Palatuwa in the Matara District, as the fifth of nine siblings, and was brought up in Weeraketiya in the southern rural district of Hambantota. He hails from a well-known political family in Sri Lanka. His father, D. A. Rajapaksa, was a prominent politician, independence agitator, Member of Parliament, Deputy Speaker and Cabinet Minister of Agriculture and Land in Wijeyananda Dahanayake's government. His elder brother, Mahinda Rajapaksa was first elected to parliament as a member of the Sri Lanka Freedom Party at the age of 24 in 1970, who gradually rose through the party ranks becoming the Leader of the Opposition in 2001, Prime Minister in 2004 and the President of Sri Lanka in 2005. Two of his other brothers, Chamal Rajapaksa and Basil Rajapaksa, are also current Members of Parliament. He obtained his primary and secondary education at Ananda College, Colombo.

== Military career (1971–1991) ==
=== Early career ===
Rajapaksa joined the Sri Lankan Army as a cadet officer on 26 April 1971, when Sri Lanka was still a dominion of the British Commonwealth and was in the midst of the 1971 JVP insurrection. Following his basic officer training at the Army Training Centre, Diyatalawa in its 4th intake, he was commissioned as a second lieutenant on 26 May 1972, in the Sri Lanka Signals Corps. Soon after he was sent for the signal young officers course at the Military College of Signals, Rawalpindi. On his return, he was assigned as the signals officer to the Task Force Anti Illicit Immigration, based at its headquarters in Palaly, under the command of Colonel Tissa Weeratunga. In April 1974, he was promoted to Lieutenant and in October he transferred to the Sri Lanka Sinha Regiment as an infantry officer. In April 1975, he attended the infantry young officers course at the School of Infantry and Tactics, Queta. Returning in June, he was assigned as the battalion intelligence officer at the Echelon Barracks in Colombo and was promoted to captain in April 1977. Following the change of government in the 1977 general election, he was transferred to the Army Training Centre, Diyatalawa as an officer instructor in August 1977. In January 1978, he was appointed Grade III Staff Officer of A branch, handling administration of the Diyatalawa Garrison. During this time he attended the senior staff and tactics course at the Panagoda Cantonment and took part in preparing a report on encroachment of state lands in the north and eastern provinces for the Defense Ministry. Thereafter in 1980, he joined the newly formed Rajarata Rifles as its adjutant under its first commanding officer Lieutenant Colonel V. K. Nanayakkara. Rajapaksa played a major role in establishing the regimental headquarters of the newly formed regiment at Saliyapura. That year he attended the Counter-Insurgency and Jungle Warfare School, Assam and in 1982 he was selected to attended the Command and Staff course at Defence Services Staff College in Wellington in India, gaining the psc qualification and a Master of Science in Defence and Strategic Studies from the University of Madras.

=== Gajaba Regiment ===
While Rajapaksa was at staff college in India, the Rajarata Rifles were amalgamated with the Vijayabahu Infantry Regiment and the Gajaba Regiment was formed. Having been transferred to the Gajaba Regiment, on his return to the island, he was appointed second-in-command of the 1st Battalion, Gajaba Regiment (1GR) under the command of Lieutenant Colonel Vijaya Wimalaratne, instead of the traditional staff appointment that followed the returning officer from staff college. Following retraining, the 1st Battalion was deployed to the Jaffna peninsula between 1983 and 1984 and again 1985 with the escalation of the Sri Lankan Civil War. During this time he commanded detachments of his battalion based in Jaffna and at Elephant Pass. In 1985 he led an ad hoc unit made up of new recruits that successfully ambushed a LTTE raiding party, for which he was awarded commendation from the President J.R. Jayewardene in the first combat award ceremony. He took part in Operation Liberation commanding the 1GR, the offensive mounted to liberate Vadamarachi from LTTE in 1987. In July 1987, the 1GR was transferred to Colombo and Rajapaksa assisted Colonel Wimalaratne in securing Colombo with the outset of the second JVP insurrection until his battalion was transferred to Trincomalee in October 1987. In December 1987, Rajapaksa appointed a Grade II Staff Officer at Army Headquarters in the training branch under Colonel C. H. Fernando, Director of Training. In 1988, he attended the advanced infantry officers course at the United States Army Infantry School, Fort Benning. He was promoted to lieutenant colonel while in course and returned to his staff appointment at Army Headquarters in January 1989. In July 1989, he was appointed commanding officer of the 1st Battalion, Gajaba Regiment. Soon after the 1GR was moved to Matale and Rajapaksa was appointment as the military coordinating officer of the Matale District at the height of the 1987–1989 JVP insurrection undertaking counter insurgency operations in the district and remained in that capacity until end of the insurrection in December 1989. During 1990, he commanded 1GR in Weli Oya, serving as the military coordinating officer for the Weli Oya sector under the command of Brigadier Janaka Perera and with 1 GR took part in the Operation "Strike Hard" and Operation Thrividha Balaya in Jaffna under the command of Major General Denzil Kobbekaduwa. In January 1991, he was appointed Deputy Commandant of the Sir John Kotelawala Defence Academy and held the position until his early retirement from the army on 1 November 1991.

== Immigration to the United States ==
Following his return to civilian life, Rajapaksa read for a postgraduate diploma in information technology from the University of Colombo and joined Informatics, an IT firm based in Colombo as a Marketing Manager in 1992. He subsequently migrated to the United States in 1998 and worked at Loyola Law School in Los Angeles, U.S., as a Systems Integrator and Unix Solaris Administrator.

== Secretary to the Ministry of Defence and Urban Development (2005–2015) ==
In order to assist his brother's presidential election campaign, Rajapaksa returned to Sri Lanka from the United States in 2005. He re obtained citizenship of Sri Lanka but kept his US citizenship. Gotabaya Rajapaksa was appointed to the post of Permanent Secretary of the Ministry of Defence in November 2005 by newly elected President Mahinda Rajapaksa. In this capacity, he oversaw the military operation which eventually defeated the LTTE in May 2009.

With his position, Rajapaksa also pursued projects like the Colombo Beautification Project, which revitalised public centers and parks in Colombo, as well as many other development projects focused on places such as Battaramulla Diyatha Uyana, Ape Gama Park, Wetland Park, Nugegoda, Arcade Independence Square, Weras Ganga Park and Defence Headquarters Complex. In 2011, the Ministry of Defense was renamed to the Ministry of Defense and Urban Development, having absorbed responsibilities related to urban development. Results of his work were remarkable as Colombo became to the top of the list of fast developing cities in the world in 2015 by an annual travel study by MasterCard.

=== Assassination attempt ===
On 1 December 2006, at approximately 10:35 an assassin attempted to drive an explosive-laden auto-rikshaw into Rajapaksa's motorcade as it traveled through Kollupitiya, Colombo. The Sri Lanka Army Commandos guarding him obstructed the vehicle carrying the explosives before it reached Rajapakse's vehicle and two commandos were instantly killed. Rajapaksa escaped unhurt. The LTTE were blamed for the attack.

=== Karuna defection ===
Gotabaya is credited with using the Karuna faction effectively during the war to defeat the LTTE. The LTTE commander Vinayagamoorthi Muralitharan, better known as Colonel Karuna, told British authorities that Rajapaksa was instrumental in arranging for him to be issued with a false diplomatic passport so that he could flee to Britain in September 2007. These allegations were denied by the Sri Lankan Foreign Minister Rohitha Bogollagama at the time, and later by Rajapaksa.

=== Criticism of the United Nations and western countries ===
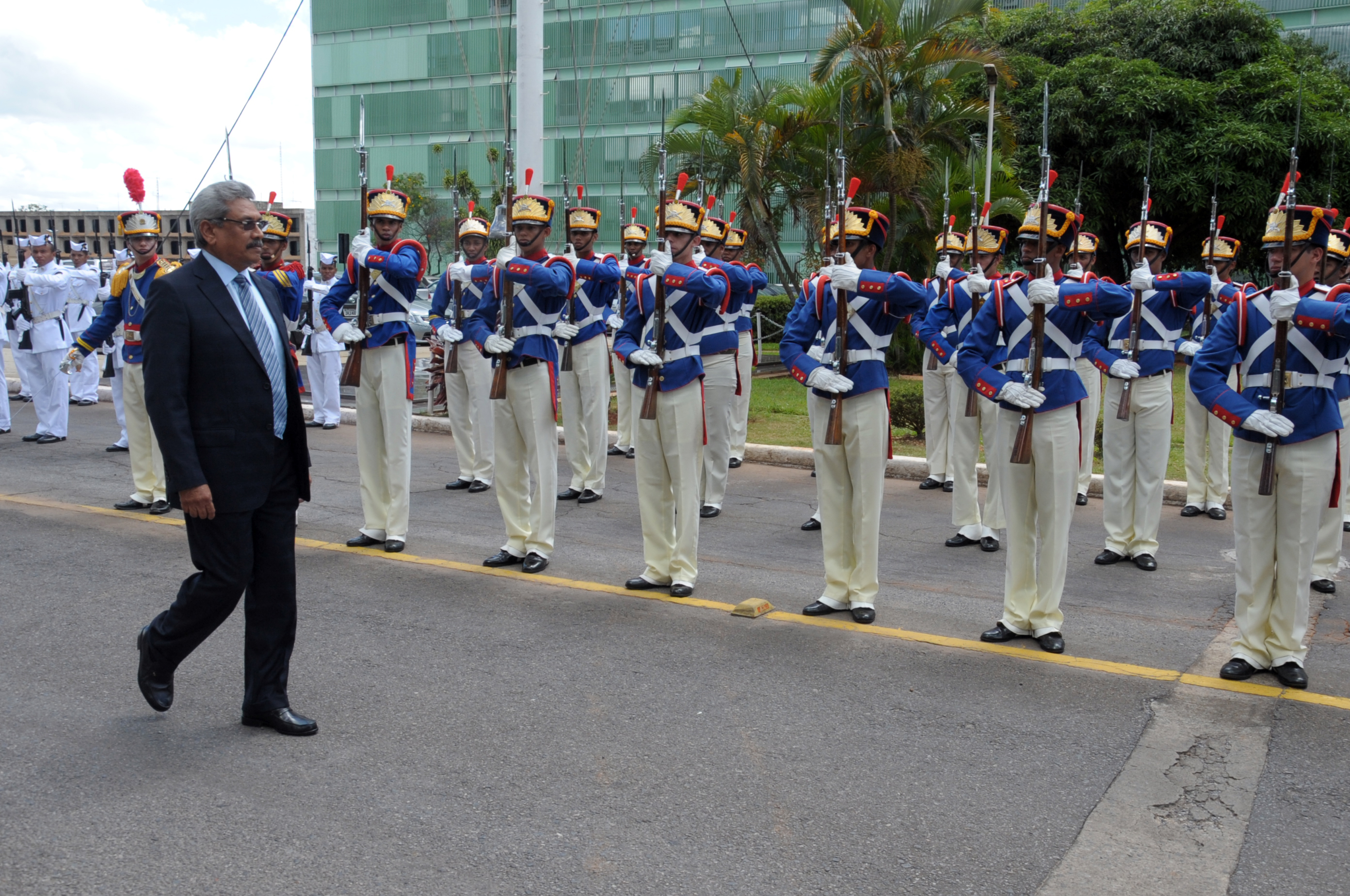
Gotabaya Rajapaksa during an official tour of Brazil

In June 2007, Rajapaksa was severely critical of the United Nations (UN) and of western governments. He accused the UN of having been infiltrated by terrorists "for 30 years or so", and as a result the UN was fed incorrect information. He also alleged that Britain and the EU were bullying Sri Lanka, and concluded that Sri Lanka "does not need them", and that they don't provide any significant amount of aid to the country.

=== Legal dispute with Lasantha Wickrematunge ===
In August 2007, journalist Lasantha Wickrematunge published an exposé on a military contract involving the purchase of the Mikoyan MiG-27 Ukrainian Fighter Aircraft. On 18 October 2007, attorney-at-law Ali Sabry and lawyers representing Rajapaksa wrote to Wickrematunge threatening to sue him for defamation for Rs. 2 billion (€14 million) in damages. On 22 February 2008, Rajapaksa filed a lawsuit for defamation against Wickrematunge and Leader Publications, charging that the allegations made by Wickrematunge against Rajapaksa were defamatory. Rajapaksa asserted that his role of Defence Secretary "had been adversely affected due to Wickrematunge, creating adverse consequences to the war against the rebels in the battlefield."

On 5 December 2008, a judge ordered Leader Publications not to publish any reports about Gotabaya Rajapaksa, for two weeks.

Several weeks later, Wickrematunge was assassinated days before he was to testify and give evidence in court regarding the MiG deal. Wickrematunge's daughter has publicly held Rajapaksa responsible for the assassination. Rajapaksa denied any involvement in the killing and questioned the focus on Wickrematunge's death in a BBC interview shortly afterwards.

=== Alleged human rights violations ===
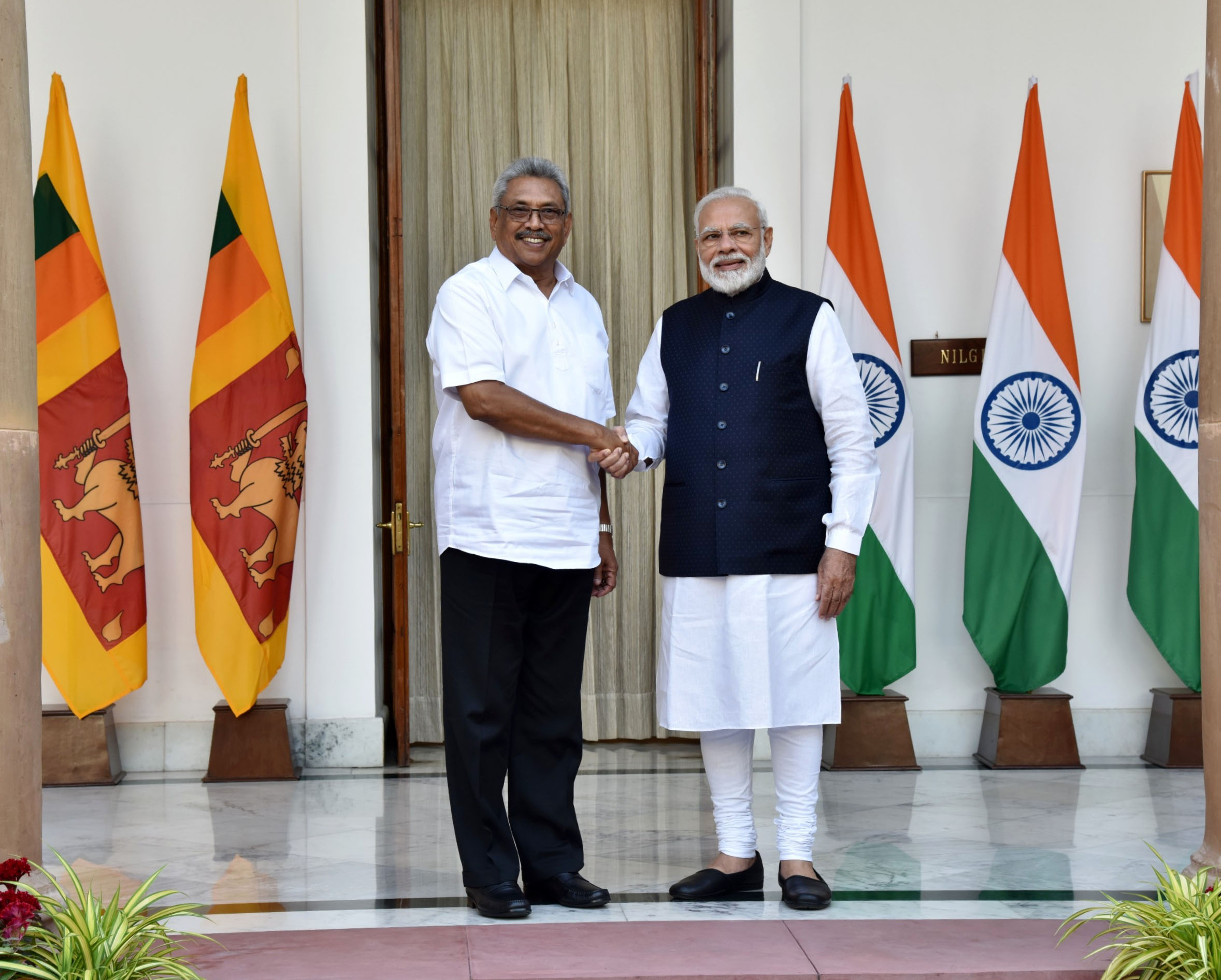
President Rajapaksa meets with Indian Prime Minister Narendra Modi during a state visit to India

On 3 February 2009, Defence Secretary Gotabaya Rajapaksa stated to the international media (in reference to the only hospital in the war front being shelled), that everything was a legitimate target if they were not within the government designated No Fire Zone and that all persons subject to attack by the armed forces were legitimate LTTE targets as there were no independent observers, only LTTE sympathisers.

During his campaign for the 2010 presidential election against Mahinda Rajapaksa, General Sarath Fonseka accused Defence Secretary Gotabaya Rajapaksa of ordering the killing of LTTE leaders who attempted to surrender during the final stages of the civil war. Rajapaksa denied the allegation, describing it as a political attack and maintaining that no such order had been given. Fonseka subsequently said that he had been misquoted by The Sunday Leader and retracted the allegation.

In an interview on the Sri Lanka TV channel Ada Derana on 16 March 2015, Rajapaksa stated that he was a citizen of the United States but couldn't travel to the United States because of alleged war crimes charges against him. Rajapaksa however visited the United States in 2016 and two Tamil groups urged the United States government to arrest and prosecute him. The Sirisena-Wickremesinghe government, which had come to power after defeating Mahinda Rajapaksa in 2015, rejected the calls for his arrest.

According to a U.S. diplomatic cable later made public by WikiLeaks, Major General Prasad Samarasinghe, then the Army's military spokesman, provided the U.S. Embassy in Colombo with confidential information concerning abductions and alleged political retribution against individuals considered disloyal to the Rajapaksa administration. The Sunday Leader subsequently reported on the contents of the cable. During her visit to the country, United Nations Human Rights Commissioner Navanetham Pillay expressed her disappointment over "white van" related disappearances reported in Colombo and other parts of the country, which were not covered by the Commission of Inquiry on Disappearances set up by the government.

Major Prabath Bulathwatte, a member of military intelligence linked by investigators to the killing of Lasantha Wickrematunge and attacks on other journalists, was nominated for a diplomatic posting in Thailand at the direction of Defence Secretary Gotabaya Rajapaksa in January 2010. The posting was subsequently cancelled after Mahinda Rajapaksa won the presidential election. Investigators had linked Bulathwatte to the attacks through telephone and other technical evidence. Following the defeat of the Rajapaksa government in 2015, various investigations into the killings, abductions and assaults of journalists during its rule uncovered allegations of a secret military intelligence unit operating outside the Army's normal command structure and allegedly controlled by Gotabaya Rajapaksa.

Nadarajah Raviraj, a human rights lawyer and parliamentarian, was shot and killed in Colombo on 10 November 2006. At a magisterial hearing in February 2016, former police intelligence officer Liyanarachchi Abeyratna testified that Gotabaya Rajapaksa had arranged a payment of Rs. 50 million to the Karuna faction to assassinate Raviraj. The allegation was denied, and the five defendants subsequently tried for the murder were acquitted in December 2016.

On 10 January 2023, Gotabaya and his brother, Mahinda Rajapaksa were sanctioned by Canada for "gross and systematic violations of human rights" during the Sri Lankan civil war. In an exceedingly rare move, the former heads of state have been barred from entering the western country.

=== Relationship with the media ===
Rajapaksa has been accused of threatening journalists on several occasions, including telling two journalists attached to the state-owned Lake House Publications that unless they stop criticising the armed forces "what will happen to you is beyond my control". When asked by the two journalists if he was threatening them, he replied "I am definitely not threatening your lives. Our services are appreciated by 99 per cent of the people. They love the Army Commander (General Sarath Fonseka) and the Army. There are Sri Lankan patriots who love us do and will do what is required if necessary." In April 2007 he was accused of allegedly calling the editor of the Daily Mirror Champika Liyanaarachchi and threatening her, saying that she would escape reprisals only if she resigned. He was also accused of threatening to "exterminate" the Daily Mirror journalist Uditha Jayasinghe for writing articles about the plight of civilian war casualties.

A 5 December 2008 story from The New York Times quoted his news reporting position as "he insists that journalists should not be allowed to report anything that demoralises the war effort".

In an editorial titled "A brother out of control" (16 August 2011), The Hindu raised the observation, "President Rajapaksa would be well advised to distance himself swiftly from his brother's stream-of-consciousness on sensitive issues that are not his business. This includes an outrageous comment that because a Tamil woman, an "LTTE cadre" who was a British national, interviewed in the Channel 4 documentary was "so attractive" but had been neither raped nor killed by Sri Lankan soldiers, the allegation of sexual assault by soldiers could not be true. For this statement alone, Mr. Gotabaya Rajapaksa must be taken to task."

In May 2015, The Sunday Leader tendered an unconditional apology to Gotabaya Rajapaksa for a series of articles regarding the purchase of MIG 27 airplanes for the Sri Lanka Air Force.

=== Alleged corruption ===
Sripathi Sooriyarachchi, assassinated journalist Lasantha Wickrematunge and others had accused Rajapaksa of corruption since 2006. In 2015 Interpol provided further evidence to the Sri Lankan government on corrupt military procurements. In March 2015, a Sri Lankan court imposed a travel ban on Rajapaksa over allegations he used a commercial floating armory as a private arsenal. The travel ban was lifted by the court in December 2016. UNP MP Mangala Samaraweera claimed that Gotabaya's son illegally occupied a house rented for a consulate in Los Angeles and caused millions of rupees in losses to the state. Rajapaksa rejected the allegations regarding occupying a house rented for a consulate in LA.

== Personal life ==
Gotabhaya Rajapaksa is married to Ayoma Rajapaksa and has one son. Rajapaksa had dual Sri Lankan and US citizenship but had to renounce his US citizenship prior to running for president in 2019. His wife and son retain their US citizenship.

=== Alleged assassination plot ===
In September 2018 Director of the Anti Corruption Movement revealed a conspiracy to assassinate President Maithripala Sirisena and former Defence Secretary Gotabaya Rajapaksa because the duo are against the drug trade. CID of Sri Lanka Police investigated the issue.

== 2019 presidential campaign ==
It was widely speculated and even claimed by several politicians that Gotabaya Rajapaksa would be contesting the 2020 elections. However, this was denied by Rajapaksa but claimed that he will accept if he was offered the candidacy. Fuelling speculation even more, Rajapaksa appointed a communications strategist and activist, Milinda Rajapaksha, as his official media spokesperson in August 2018.

=== United States lawsuit ===
In April 2019, Lasantha Wickrematunge's daughter Ahimsa Wickrematunge filed a civil lawsuit against Gotabaya Rajapaksa in the state of California. Wickrematunge's daughter's lawsuit alleged that Rajapaksa was behind his death. Rajapaksa, who was visiting the U.S. to renounce his citizenship, was served legal documents outside a Trader Joe's parking lot in Pasadena.

Rajapaksa arrived back to Sri Lanka from the United States and was greeted by his supporters and members of the Buddhist Clergy who came to the Bandaranaike International Airport to stand in solidarity with Rajapaksa. Due to the case filed against him, Rajapaksa's ability to renounce his citizenship was stalled. Rajapaksa alleged that the case filed against him by Wickrematunge's daughter was "politically motivated" by the United National Party to stop him from contesting the presidential election that year.

On 21 October 2019, the United States District Court for the Central District of California granted Gotabaya Rajapaksa's motion to dismiss, finding that he was entitled to foreign official immunity for acts undertaken while serving as Secretary of Defense.

On 27 February 2020, the Ninth Circuit Court of Appeals granted Wickrematunge's daughter's request to vacate the District Court's ruling that Rajapaksa is entitled to foreign official immunity for acts committed while he was Secretary of Defense of Sri Lanka. The Ninth Circuit granted the request to dismiss the case without prejudice.

On 11 August 2019, Sri Lanka Podujana Peramuna led by former president Mahinda Rajapaksa announced that Rajapaksa will be their candidate for the 2019 presidential election. Rajapaksa campaigned on a pro-nationalistic, economic development and national security platform in which he gained 6,924,255 votes, which was 52.25% of the total cased votes and 1,360,016 votes majority over New Democratic Front candidate Sajith Premadasa. Rajapaksa won a majority in the predominant Sinhalese areas of the island which included the districts of Kalutara, Galle, Matara, Hambantota, Monaragala, Ratnapura, Badulla, Kurunegala, Puttalam, Gampaha, Kandy, Matale, Polonnaruwa Colombo, Kegalle and Anuradhapura, while Premadasa gained a majority in areas dominated by Tamil and Muslim minorities, which had been effected by the civil war.

=== Citizenship row ===
During the campaign, several political parties including then ruling United National Party accused him of having American citizenship and claimed that he stayed and lived in America for more than ten years and revealed that he was not a Sri Lankan citizen. Gotabaya was also pressured not to contest the presidential elections because of holding dual citizenship. Further he was alleged to have carried a duplicate Sri Lankan passport with him and court cases were pending against him over the citizenship issue and the issue regarding his passport. Former President and the elder brother of Gotabaya, Mahinda Rajapaksa was also accused of using his executive powers to grant his brother, the Sri Lankan citizenship after commencing his first term as president in November 2005. The judge of the Court of Appeal gave verdict on the former's pending court cases on 4 October 2019, dismissed the petition challenging Gotabaya's citizenship. He was also allowed to contest at the elections but did not take part in the debate among presidential candidates which was held on 5 October 2019, was also historically Sri Lanka's first-ever debate to have been conducted among presidential candidates for an upcoming election. Rajapaksa's name was included in the Quarterly Publication of Individuals Who Have Chosen to Expatriate for Q2 2020.

== Presidency (2019–2022) ==
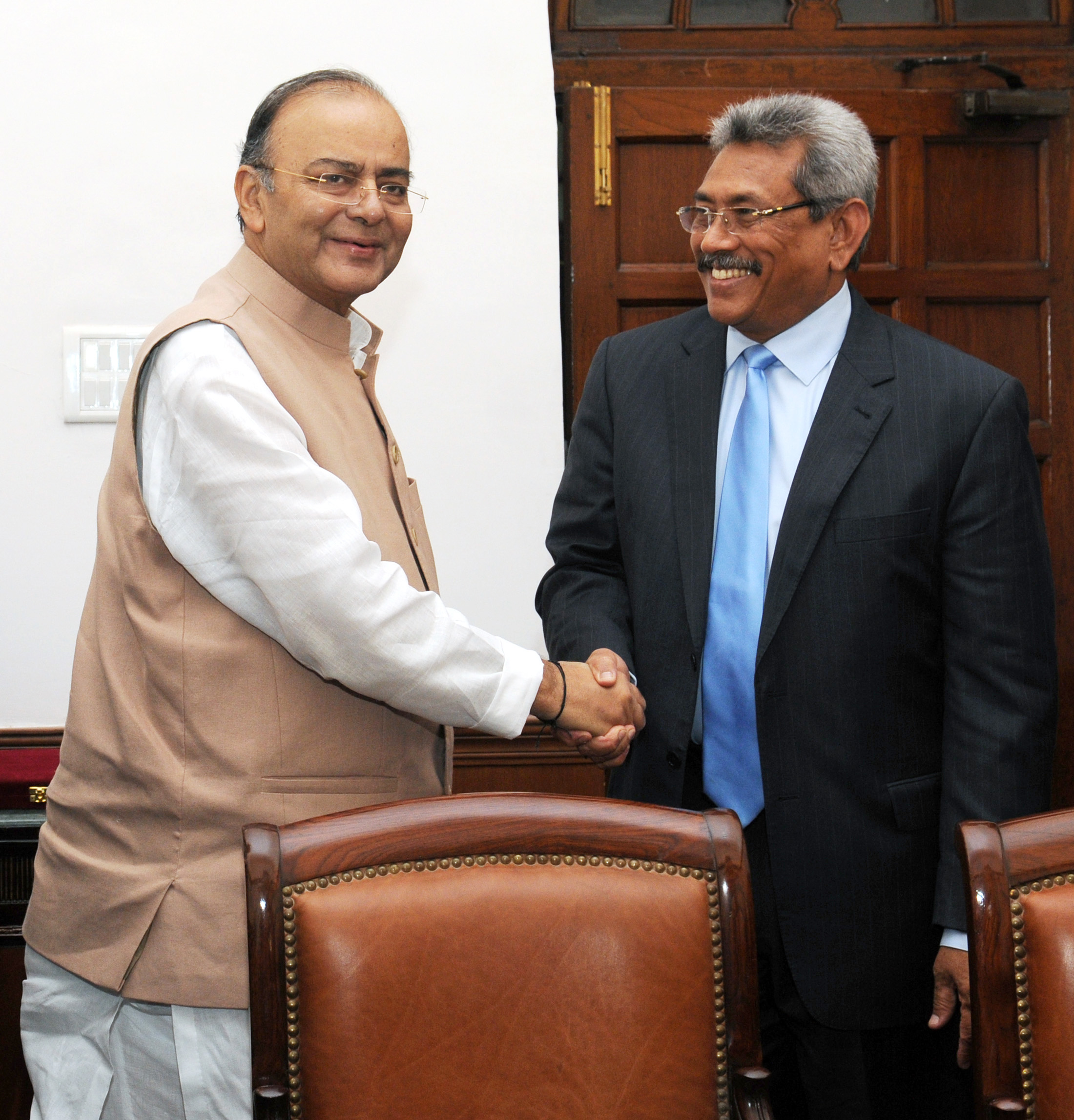
Gotabaya Rajapaksa meets Indian minister Arun Jaitley

Rajapaksa's inauguration took place at the Ruwanwelisaya in Anuradhapura on 18 November 2019. It is the first elected office Rajapaksa has held and he is the first non-career politician and former military officer to serve as president. Following the assumption of the office of president, he announced intentions to form a new government and taking over the portfolio of defence. On 19 November 2019, following taking over assumed duties at the Presidential Secretariat, he appointed P. B. Jayasundera as Secretary to the President and Major General Kamal Gunaratne as Secretary of Defence, as well as a new Secretary of the Treasury and the Secretary to the Ministry of Foreign Affairs. On 20 November, Prime Minister Ranil Wickremesinghe had agreed to resign for Rajapaksa to form a caretaker government until fresh parliamentary elections can be held after the President can constitutionally dissolve parliament in March 2020. On the same day, the presidential secretariat called for all provincial governors to tender their resignations. On 21 November, he appointed his brother Mahinda Rajapaksa as Prime Minister following the resignation of Ranil Wickremesinghe and the day after appointed a 15-member cabinet. Thus, Sri Lanka became only the second nation in the world after Poland to have a combination of brothers taking charge as president and Prime Minister of a country at the same occasion. Following the protests calling for his resignation, Gotabaya Rajapaksa appointed a new Cabinet to pacify the protests. He took away the power from three of his relatives, ousting two of his brothers and his nephew from the Cabinet. Mahinda Rajapaksa was still the Prime Minister.

=== COVID-19 pandemic ===
The COVID-19 pandemic in Sri Lanka started in March 2020. Rajapaksa at first refused to lock down the country but later decided to impose a curfew when the number of cases began to rise. Rajapaksa dissolved parliament on 2 March. The election was initially put on by Rajapaksa on 25 April 2020, was then postponed by the election commission to 20 June 2020. His administration is said to have caused the Sri Lankan economic and food crisis following his policies of tax reduction, money printing, and organic farming.

=== 2020 Sri Lankan parliamentary election ===
General Election was held on 5 August 2020. Sri Lanka Podujana Peramuna (SLPP) was able to secure a landslide victory in the election claiming the majority winning 145 seats out of 225 seats. The main opposition party Samagi Jana Balawegaya won just 54 seats. SLPP victory is mainly owing to the predominant success in curbing the COVID-19 pandemic and due to the negative publicity about the UNP-led government, which was accused of a major intelligence failure triggered by the aftermath of the 2019 Easter attacks.

=== Environmental Policy and Deforestation ===
The Sri Lankan government under President Gotabaya transferred the administration of non-protected forests, known as "other state forests" (OSF), to regional authorities, in a controversial circular, with a view to releasing them for agriculture and development. The move was claimed to be a part of government efforts to boost domestic food production, but has been criticized by environmental activists as government-backed deforestation and implied permission-granting for unregulated logging concessions in high biodiversity areas.

=== Agricultural catastrophe ===
In April 2021, Rajapaksa "declared that the entire country would immediately switch to organic farming", yet as of February 2022, still "a majority of farmers say they received no training in organic techniques". The 2021 rice harvest failed, leading to a $1.2 billion emergency food aid program, a $200 million income-support program, and "huge sums to import hundreds of thousands of tons of rice". Rajapaksa's "sudden and disastrous turn toward organic farming" was panned in international media and the policies were scaled back before the year was over. By April 2022, the government had reversed its decision and was seeking a US$700 million loan from the World Bank to revive the agricultural sector by providing it with imported agrochemicals following a massive drop production in the "Maha" season.

=== Economic crisis and downfall ===
Rajapaksa administration introduced massive tax cuts in late 2019, which led to a drop in government revenue that was soon compounded with the onset of the COVID-19 pandemic, which saw the island nation losing its lucrative US$3 billion tourism industry that put 200,000 out of work in 2020 and most of 2021. Although the export sector picked up by 2021 and tourism started picking up, it appeared that Sri Lanka was facing its most severe economic crisis since its independence in 1948 due to the loss of revenue from tax cuts, rampant money printing and unsustainable borrowings. By end of 2021, Sri Lanka was facing a debt crisis with a possibility of sovereign default. In early 2022, the Rajapaksa administration avoided debt restructuring opposing an IMF bailout in favour of a homegrown solution for the debt crisis. This strategy depleted foreign currency reserves and gold reserves in an effort to bolster the Sri Lankan Rupee and repayment of sovereign bonds, the central bank free floated of the currency in early March which saw a 30% depreciation of the Rupee against the dollar in days following major shortages of fuel, food and medicine. According to a poll conducted by Verité Research in March 2022 the government's approval rating had fallen to just 10% as a result of the crisis. The Rajapaksa administration reached out the IMF in March as public protests increased in the face of shortages of electricity, fuel, cooking gas, medicine and food, with an IMF report published in late March reported that Sri Lanka was facing an solvency problem with unsustainable debt. The administration has been heavily leaning on friendly countries such as China and India for cash swaps, credit lines and loans to import essentials and debt service, in turn facing accusations of making strategic concessions to these countries. Following severe shortages of fuel, the state owned Ceylon Electricity Board was forced to implement 10–13 hour power cuts across the island in late March. This triggered popular protests in parts of the island and on the night of 31 March, protesters charged at Rajapaksa's private residence in Mirihana which turned violent, resulting in the police dispersing the crowds and declaring a curfew until dawn. On 3 April, the entire cabinet of ministers resigned and Rajapaksa offered to form a national government with the other political parties in parliament, which was turned down.

On 18 April, Rajapaksa appointed 17 new cabinet members, selected among his party members. This move was seen as a sign of Rajapaksa's lack of willingness to listen and adhere to the protesters' demands.

=== Resignation and exile ===
On 9 July 2022, Rajapaksa fled his official residence in Colombo prior to protesters breaking through police barricades and entering the premises. Protesters were seen occupying the mansion, even swimming in the president's pool. Later that evening the Speaker of the Parliament confirmed that the president would resign his office on 13 July 2022. On 11 July, the Prime Minister's Office also reconfirmed it. On 9 and 10 July, Rajapaksa's whereabouts were unknown to the public until Sri Lankan military sources told the BBC on 11 July that the President was on a Navy vessel in Sri Lankan waters. Later that day, the Speaker of the Parliament announced that the President was still in the country. It was later revealed that Rajapaksa and his wife were evacuated from the President's House on the morning of 9 July by the Sri Lanka Navy and had boarded SLNS Gajabahu which then departed Colombo harbour and sailed within Sri Lankan territorial waters allowing Rajapaksa to maintain communications while being safely out of reach of the protesters. On 12 July, it was reported that Rajapaksa was blocked from leaving the country by immigration staff at Bandaranaike International Airport and his visa request for United States was rejected.

In the morning of 13 July, Rajapaksa left Sri Lanka via an Antonov An-32 military transport aircraft of the Sri Lanka Air Force to Maldives. There were protests in Maldives upon his arrival. While in Maldives, he issued a gazette stating that he is "unable to exercise, perform and discharge the powers, duties and functions of the Office of the President" by reason of his absence from Sri Lanka and appointed Ranil Wickremesinghe as acting president under Article 37 (1) of the constitution of Sri Lanka. However, Rajapaksa was yet to officially resign from presidency on 13 July as he had previously announced on 9 July. On 14 July, Rajapaksa left Maldives for Singapore via a Saudi Airlines flight. Singapore's Ministry of Foreign Affairs said in a statement that Rajapaksa had been allowed entry into Singapore on a private visit, and that he had neither asked for nor been granted any asylum. Later that day, President Rajapaksa sent his resignation letter to the Speaker of the Parliament through email, formally announcing his resignation. Rajapaksa would be the first Sri Lankan president to resign in the middle of his term.

In his resignation letter which was formally read out at the parliament on 16 July, he had stated:

"It is my personal belief that I took all possible steps to address this crisis, including inviting parliamentarians to form an all-party or unity government."

— Gotabaya Rajapaksa

== Post-presidency ==
=== Return to Sri Lanka ===
On 2 September 2022, Rajapaksa returned to Sri Lanka, ending his 52-day self-imposed exile. On his return he was provided with a new official residence and security granted to a former president.

=== Conviction of economic mismanagement ===
On 14 November 2023, following a case filed by Transparency International Sri Lanka (TISL) and other four activists, the Supreme Court of Sri Lanka found Rajapaksa, his brothers Mahinda and Basil and several other officials guilty of economic mismanagement between 2019 and 2022, stating that the respondents breached the fundamental rights to equal protection of the law in terms of Article 12(1) of the Constitution. While no claim was made for compensation by the petitioners, the court ordered that each petitioner was entitled to a legal cost of Rs.150,000 (US$450) by the respondents.

== Honours and awards ==
=== Decorations and medals ===
During his 20 years of military service, Rajapaksa has received medals from three Presidents of Sri Lanka, J. R. Jayewardene, Ranasinghe Premadasa and D. B. Wijetunga. These include the gallantry medals, Rana Wickrama Padakkama and Rana Sura Padakkama, service medals and campaign medals. He received the Eastern Humanitarian Operations Medal and the Northern Humanitarian Operations Medal during his tenure as Defense Secretary.

Ribbon	Name	Date awarded
	Rana Wickrama Padakkama (RWP)	1994
	Rana Sura Padakkama (RSP)	1994
	Desha Putra Sammanaya	1994
	Eastern Humanitarian Operations Medal (with clasp)	2010
	Northern Humanitarian Operations Medal (with clasp)	2010
	Purna Bhumi Padakkama	1984
	North and East Operations Medal	1986
	Vadamarachchi Operation Medal	1987
	Sri Lanka Armed Services Long Service Medal	1984
	President's Inauguration Medal	1978

=== Honorary degrees ===
Gotabaya Rajapaksa received an Honorary Doctorate, a Doctor of Letters from the University of Colombo on 6 September 2009, along with his brother President Mahinda Rajapaksa following public acclaim as a war hero.

=== Environmental awards ===
In July 2020, he was awarded the Zero carbon certificate for conducting his election campaign representing SLPP in eco-friendly manner. His election campaign became the first zero carbon election campaign in the world.

== See also ==
- Eelam War IV
- List of attacks attributed to the LTTE
- List of attacks on civilians attributed to the Sri Lankan government forces
- List of political families in Sri Lanka
- List of Sri Lankan non-career Permanent Secretaries

Government offices
Preceded by Asoka Jayawardena	Secretary to the Ministry of Defence and Urban Development; 2005–2015	Succeeded by B. M. U. D. Basnayake
Political offices
Preceded by Maithripala Sirisena	President of Sri Lanka; 2019–2022	Succeeded by Ranil Wickremesinghe
Preceded by Maithripala Sirisena	Minister of Defence; 2019–2022	Succeeded by Ranil Wickremesinghe
Preceded by Susil Premajayantha	Minister of Technology; 2020–2022	Succeeded by Ranil Wickremesinghe
