= Vijaya Wimalaratne =

Sri Lankan Army Officer

Major General Vijaya Wimalaratne † RWP, RSP, VSV, USP
- Vijaya Wimalaratne in Brigadier insignia
- Born: 25 August 1940
- Died: 8 August 1992 (aged 51); Point Arali, Kayts Island, Sri Lanka
- Military career
- Allegiance: Sri Lanka
- Branch: Sri Lanka Army
- Service years: 1962–1992
- Rank: Major general (posthumously)
- Nickname: Jungle Wimale
- Units: Gajaba Regiment, Gemunu Watch
- Commands: Security Forces – Jaffna, Amphibious Task Force, Garrison Command Colombo, 1st Brigade, 1st Gajaba Battalion
- Conflicts: Sri Lankan Civil War
- Awards: Rana Wickrama Padakkama; Rana Sura Padakkama; Vishista Seva Vibhushanaya; Uttama Seva Padakkama

Major General Vanigamuni Indrajith Vijeyakumar Mendis Wimalaratne, RWP, RSP, VSV, USP (Sinhala: විජය විමලරත්න; 25 August 1940 – 8 August 1992) was a senior Sri Lanka Army officer. One of the most distinguished field commanders in Sri Lanka, Wimalaratne raised the Gajaba Regiment. He commanded the 1st Brigade during the Vadamarachchi Operation, the Amphibious Task Force Commander during Operation Balavegaya, and was the Commander Security Forces – Jaffna at the time of his death in a landmine explosion at Point Arali in the Kayts Island while making preparations to re-capture Jaffna.

== Early life and education ==
Born on 25 August 1940, second of a family of eight boys, Wimalaratne was educated at Royal College, Colombo.

== Military career ==
=== Early career ===
Wimalaratne joined the Ceylon Army as an Officer Cadet in August 1962 and underwent training at the Indian Military Academy, in Dehradun as part of the first batch of four Ceylonese cadets sent to Dehradun. There he was the first foreign cadet to be appointed Battalion Cadet Adjutant in his final term. On his return, he was commissioned as a second lieutenant in the newly formed Gemunu Watch on 1 August 1963, leaving soon after for a jungle warfare course in Malaysia at the British Army Jungle Warfare Training School. Serving with the 1st Battalion, Gemunu Watch as a subaltern, he was appointed adjutant of the 2nd (Volunteer) Battalion, Gemunu Watch in 1968. In 1970, he was appointed as an instructor conducting the jungle warfare phase for Officer Cadets at the Army Training Center (ATC) in Diyatalawa. He served till 1979 becoming the Chief Instructor of the Army Training Center, having introduced training on urban warfare and counter-insurgency. In 1976, Major Wimalaratne served as the liaison officer to the Indian Prime Minister Indira Gandhi when she took part in the Non-Aligned Summit in Colombo. He attended the British Army Staff College at Camberley.

=== Gajaba Regiment ===
In 1983, Major Wimalaratne was appointed as the first commanding officer of the Gajaba Regiment when it was formed on 14 October 1983 with the amalgamation of the Rajarata Rifles and Vijayabahu Infantry Regiment at the Saliyapura Army Camp. Promoted to lieutenant colonel, he played a major role in forming and expanding the Gajaba Regiment as one of the elite infantry regiments in the army and is remembered as its founder. Wimalaratne served as the commanding office the 1st Gajaba Battalion from its formation in October 1983 to August 1987. The 1st Gajaba Battalion was deployed to the Jaffna peninsula between 1983 and 1984 and again in 1985 with the escalation of the Sri Lankan Civil War. In addition, during this time Wimalaratne served as Acting Commander, North Central Command and Deputy Commander (Operations), Security Forces Jaffna. In 1985, he help initiate the Army Special Forces program having established the first Special Forces Squadrons.

=== Operation Liberation ===
Operation Liberation (commonly known as the Vadamarachchi Operation) was launched after months of planning on 26 May 1987. Colonel Wimalaratne was one of the field commanders of the operation, serving as the Brigade Commander of the 1st Brigade which consisted of the 1st Gemunu Watch and 1st Gajaba Battalion. The brigade group consisting of the 1st Brigade and 3rd Brigade, commanded by Brigadier Denzil Kobbekaduwa it was the largest formation deployed by the Sri Lankan Army at that point and the first conventional battle to take place in the civil war. The objective was to take the territory of Vadamarachchi in the Jaffna Peninsula from LTTE (Tamil Tiger) control. 1st Brigade broke-out of Thondamanaru area with the infantry wading across the lagoon, but was stopped by a mine-field. With the combat engineers clearing a path across, 1st Gajaba Battalion broke-out and reaching the coast, troops from the 1st Brigade defeating the defensive line commanded by the LTTE leader Soosai, made a 90 degree turn undertaking a pincer movement capturing Valvettithurai. By 31 May, the government declared that the Vadamarachchi region recaptured. During the operation Kobbekaduwa and Wimalaratne were nearly killed when the house closed to them exploded due to a bobby-trap.

=== JVP Insurrection ===
With the second phase of Operation Liberation being abandoned with the Indian intervention by Operation Poomalai and the arrival of the Indian Peace Keeping Force (IPKF), the 1987–1989 JVP insurrection began in the south of the country. Colonel Wimalaratne was appointed Commander, Garrison Command - Colombo; in charge of defense of the capital in late 1987. In 1988, he received concurrent appointment as the Principal Staff Officer, Joint Operations Command (JOC) and serving as its Director Operations. He held both posts until the insurrection was subdued in late 1989 with the capture of the leader of the JVP.

=== Northern front ===
Promoted to brigadier, he volunteered to take up command in Jaffna under Major General Kobbekaduwa, who was the general officer commanding, 2nd Division with the resumption of hostilities after the IPKF withdrew. In June 1990, the LTTE laid siege around Jaffna Fort and Wimalaratne played a major role in evacuating the garrison. The army had nominated Wimalaratne for the National Security and Strategic Study course at the National Defence College in India, however he had turned down the opportunity to remain in the front. On 10 July 1991 the LTTE launched a surprise attack on the strategic base of Elephant Pass and laid siege to the garrison. The Commander of the Army, Lieutenant General Hamilton Wanasinghe appointed Wimalaratne as the Amphibious Task Force Commander in the Operation Balavegaya which was going to be the first amphibious operation undertaken by the Sri Lanka Army. Under the Overall Command of Major General Kobbekaduwa, Wimalaratne lead the Amphibious Task Force on a successful landing in the evening of 15 July 1991 after the first attempt was delayed due to heavy resistance from the enemy. The task force broke out of the breach head and move 12 miles to relieve the siege of the garrison. During the operation, Wimalaratne was almost killed when an LTTE mortar landed in the spot he had been standing minutes prior. In January 1991, Brigadier Wimalaratne succeeded Brigadier Jaliya Nanmuni as Brigade Commander, 21 "Jaffna" Brigade.

== Death ==
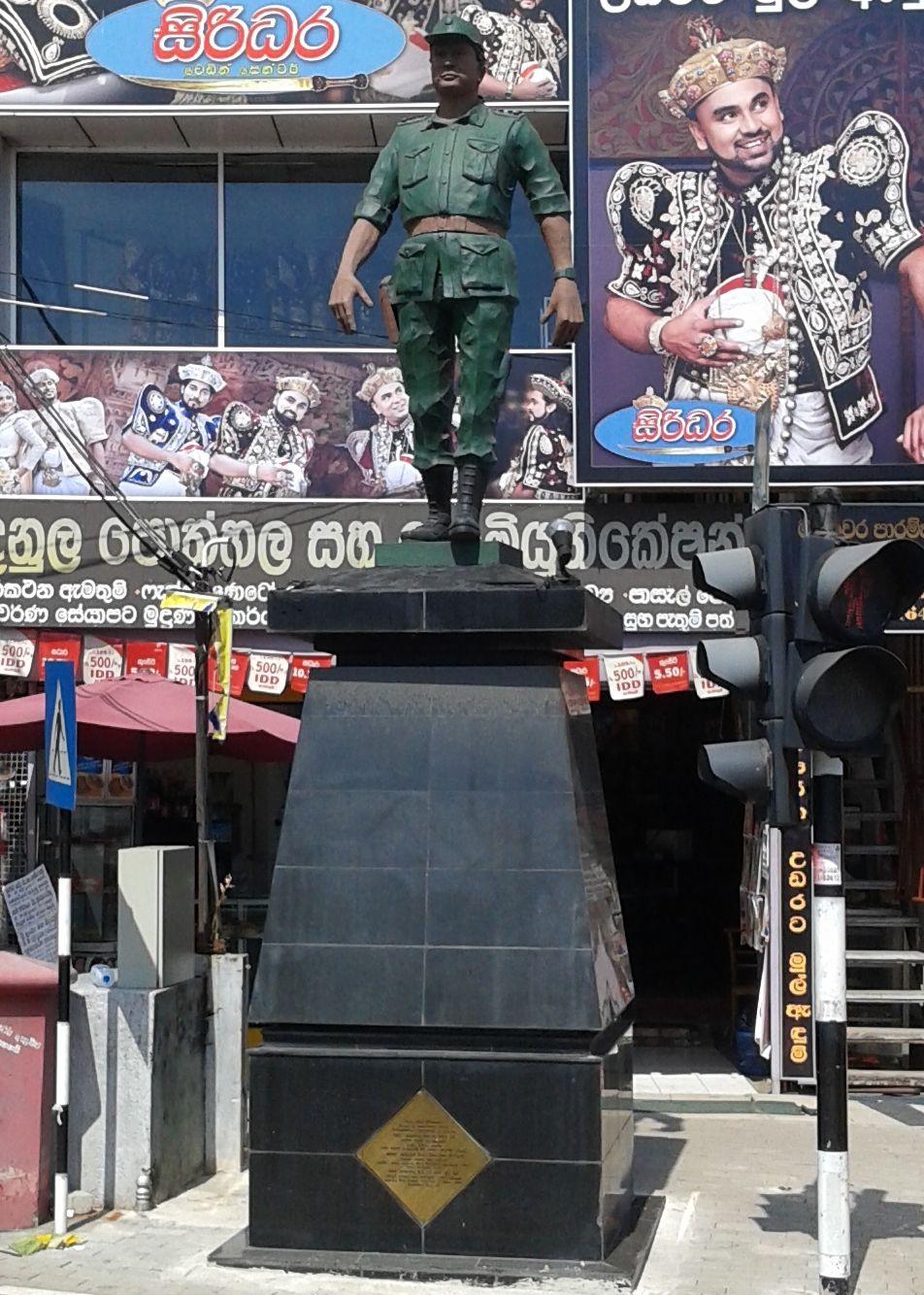
Maj Gen Vijaya Wimalaratne Statue at Kiribathgoda Town.

In July 1992, Major General Denzil Kobbekaduwa who was now General Officer Commanding Northern Sector and Brigadier Vijaya Wimalaratne who was the Commander, 21 "Jaffna" Brigade, began planning an offensive code named "Operation Final Countdown" to recapture the northern peninsula from the LTTE. Final preparations were underway and the senior commanders decided to visit Araly Point on Kayts which was the launching pad for the offensive. According to the official statement by the army, on their return, the Land Rover driven by Brigadier Vijaya Wimalaratne was destroyed by a land mine blast. Brigadier Wimalaratne was killed instantly along with Commodore (posthumously Rear Admiral) Mohan Jayamaha, Commander Northern Naval Area and seven others including Commander Asanga Lankathilaka, Lt. Colonels G.H. Ariyaratne, A. Palipahana, H.R. Stephen, all three battalion commanders and Major N.S. De Alwis, General Kobbekaduwa's ADC. General Kobbekaduwa was found alive but critically wounded and transferred by helicopter to Colombo where he succumbed to his wounds. It has been claimed by Jane's Information Group that the assassination was by the LTTE.

=== Funeral ===
Wimalaratne's remains were brought to Colombo and kept at his brother's residence for mourning. The funeral took place at the Colombo General Cemetery with full military honors. He was posthumously promoted to the rank of major general.

== Legacy ==
General Vijaya Wimalaratne is considered as the founder of the Gajaba Regiment and one of the finest field commanders of the Sri Lanka Army. A statue of General Vijaya Wimalaratne was erected at Kiribathgoda Town.

President Chandrika Kumaratunga, appointed a Presidential Commission of Inquiry, made up of Tissa Dias Bandaranayake (Chair), Justice D. P. S. Gunasekera and Gamini Ameratunga, High Court Judge to investigate the death of General Kobbekaduwa. A witness, Rohini Hathurusinghe gave evidence that Major General Vijaya Wimalaratne and Major General Ananda Weerasekara conspired to kill Kobbekaduwa with a bomb planted in his jeep, which caused a major national scandal. A report from the Criminal Investigation Department found Hathurusinghe's evidence could not be corroborated, yet Bandaranayake allowed her testimony. Justice Gunasekera and Ameratunga resigned from the commission. Televised, the commissioned became a media sensation and a statue of Wimalaratne was destroyed by a mob. Hathurusinghe changed her story and accused the Chairmen of the commission of getting her to falsely accuse the army officers. Although the validity of Hathurusinghe's evidence was questioned, The Asia Times commented that "a second and last Presidential Commission came up with highly speculative conclusions."

== Awards and decorations ==
Wimalaratne had been awarded the Rana Wickrama Padakkama and Rana Sura Padakkama for gallantry and the Republic of Sri Lanka Armed Services Medal, Army 25th Anniversary Medal, President's Inauguration Medal, Sri Lanka Armed Services Long Service Medal, Vadamarachchi Operation Medal and the Purna Bhumi Padakkama. He was posthumously awarded Vishista Seva Vibhushanaya, Uttama Seva Padakkama and Desha Putra Sammanaya.

Rana Wickrama Padakkama	Rana Sura Padakkama		Vishista Seva Vibhushanaya
Uttama Seva Padakkama	Republic of Sri Lanka Armed Services Medal	Sri Lanka Army 25th Anniversary Medal	President's Inauguration Medal
Sri Lanka Armed Services Long Service Medal	Desha Putra Sammanaya	Purna Bhumi Padakkama	Vadamarachchi Operation Medal

== Family ==
Major General Vijaya Wimalaratne was married to Manel Wimalaratne and they had a two sons and a daughter. He had nine brothers in his family. His son Dr Hiran Wimalaratne, is a Colonel in the Sri Lanka Army Medical Corps and his daughter Dr Nishanthi Wimalaratne serves in the Cardio-logical Unit of the Colombo General Hospital.

== External list ==
- Great Generals remembered with respect, gratitude and affection, Ministry of Defence
- Eelam War II - "Operation Balavegaya", LankaLibrary Forum
- Lieutenant General Denzil Lakshman Kobbekaduwa, LankaLibrary Forum
