= Sumedha Perera =

Sri Lankan army general

Major General Sumedha Perera
- Military career
- Allegiance: Sri Lanka
- Branch: Sri Lanka Army
- Service years: 1979 – 2018
- Rank: Major General
- Unit: Gajaba Regiment
- Commands: Deputy Chief of Staff
- Conflicts: Sri Lankan Civil War
- Awards: Weera Wickrama Vibhushanaya; Rana Wickrama Padakkama; Rana Sura Padakkama; Uttama Seva Padakkama
- Other work: Permanent Secretary to the Ministry of Mahaweli, Agriculture, Irrigation and Rural Development

Major General A. K. Sumedha Perera, WWV, RWP, RSP, USP is a retired Sri Lankan general. He is the Permanent Secretary to the Ministry of Mahaweli, Agriculture, Irrigation and Rural Development; and former Deputy Chief of Staff of the Sri Lanka Army.

Perera received his basic officer training at the Officer Training School, Madras and at the Sri Lanka Military Academy. He was commissioned as a Second Lieutenant in the Rajarata Rifles in 1981. He was transferred to the Gajaba Regiment in 1983, when the Rajarata Rifles was disbanded following a mutiny and the Gajaba Regiment was formed from the remaining personnel. With the escalation of the Sri Lankan Civil War, Perera took part in many offensive operations with the Gajaba Regiment including the Vadamarachchi Operation. He was wounded in action in 1984 and was awarded the Desha Putra Sammanaya. His awards include the gallantry medals Weera Wickrama Vibhushanaya, Rana Wickrama Padakkama with two claps, Rana Sura Padakkama with three claps and the Uttama Seva Padakkama. He had attended the Junior Command Course and the Senior Command Course at the Army War College, Mhow; Basic Parachute Course at the Indian Army's Parachute Training School, Agra; Mid-Career Course in Pakistan; Disaster Management Seminar - Pacific Command; and graduated from the PLA National Defence University.

His staff appointments include, Adjutant, Kothalawala Defence Academy, Colonel General Staff of Overall Operational Command - Colombo and served as the Military Spokesman, Ministry of Defence and Director Media, Army Headquarters. He served as Commandant of the Army Training School and the Infantry Training Centre. He was one first officers of the Air Mobile Brigade and served as the brigade commander of the 533 Infantry Brigade. He was the Colonel of the Regiment Gajaba Regiment and the Regiment Special Forces, Commander Security Force Headquarters - West, Director General General Staff, Army Headquarters and Commander Security Force Headquarters – Central. He was appointed Deputy Chief of Staff of the Army in February 2016 and served till his retirement. He is married to Himashinie Perera and has a daughter and a son. In January 2020, Major General Sumedha Perera was tipped to be appointed as Chief of the Defence Staff, but was instead appointed Permanent Secretary to the Ministry of Mahaweli, Agriculture, Irrigation and Rural Development by President Gotabaya Rajapaksa.
