= Vadamarachchi Operation =

Sri Lankan military offensive

- Part of Eelam War I of the Sri Lankan civil war
Date	26 May – 4 June 1987 (9 days)
Location	Jaffna, Sri Lanka
Result	Phase 1 objective achieved by the Sri Lankan military Phase 2 aborted due to the Indian intervention

Belligerents
Sri Lanka	Liberation Tigers of Tamil Eelam

Commanders and leaders
Cyril Ranatunga; Nalin Seneviratne; G. H. De Silva; Denzil Kobbekaduwa; Vijaya Wimalaratne	Velupillai Prabhakaran; Soosai; Radha †; Kittu

Units involved
Sri Lanka Armed Forces; Sri Lanka Army; Sri Lanka Navy; Sri Lanka Air Force	Unknown

Strength
4,000 soldiers	1,200 militants

Casualties and losses
33 killed 182 wounded	Unknown killed

Operation Liberation also known as the Vadamarachchi Operation was the military offensive carried out by the Sri Lankan Armed Forces in May and June 1987 to recapture the territory of Vadamarachchi in the Jaffna Peninsula from the LTTE (Tamil Tigers). At the time it was the largest combined services operation undertaken by the armed forces deploying multiple brigade-size formation, becoming the first conventional warfare engagement on Sri Lankan soil after the end of British colonial rule. The operation involved nearly 4,000 troops, supported by ground-attack aircraft, helicopter gunships and naval gun boats. The offensive achieved its primary objective, however operations were suspended when the Indian government dropped food supplies over Jaffna in Operation Poomalai on June 4, 1987, which prompted the Sri Lankan government to accept the Indo-Sri Lankan Accord.

== Background ==
Following the onset of the Sri Lankan Civil War, formally marked by the ambush of Sri Lanka Army patrol Four Four Bravo on 23 July 1983, the conflict escalated in the northern and eastern parts of the island. By 1987 the army found itself restricted to its fortified bases in the Palaly, Point Pedro and the old Dutch fort of Jaffna. The LTTE, which had become the dominant Tamil militant group, had established roadblocks and pillboxes around these bases, preventing any movement out of them.

This gave the LTTE a free hand in much of the Jaffna Peninsula, reducing the Sri Lankan government's control over this area. In February 1987 the military launched Operation Giant Step with the objective of expanding and clearing areas around major encampments in Jaffna, Mannar, Kilinochchi, Trincomalee and Batticaloa districts, as had been the case with the previous operations Short Shift 1 and 2.

== Planning ==
In early 1987 the Sri Lankan military formulated a plan to restore government control over the area dominated by the LTTE. This plan called for the use of a large number of troops using conventional warfare tactics to break out from the encircled military bases, destroying the LTTE and capturing the land controlled by them in the Jaffna peninsula, with the aim of bringing the war to a military conclusion. The plan was approved by Sri Lankan President J. R. Jayewardene and detailed operational planning was begun by the Joint Operations Command headed by Gen. Cyril Ranatunga, which handled coordination with the armed services, police and military intelligence headed by Col. Lionel Balagalle.

The build-up of men and material in the operational bases got underway; diversionary operations in the form of air traffic and troop movements were carried out in order to confuse LTTE cadres observing the army bases. The Minister of National Security, Lalith Athulathmudali was notified of the planned operation shortly before it started.

The army planned to deploy three brigades—the 1st Brigade, under the command of Col. Vijaya Wimalaratne, consisting of the 1st Gemunu Watch (commanded by Lt. Col. V.S. Boteju and Lt. Col. Wasantha Perera) and the 1st Gajaba Battalion (commanded by Lt. Col. Sathis Jayasundara and Maj. Gotabaya Rajapaksa); and the 3rd Brigade under the command of Brig. Denzil Kobbekaduwa, consisting of the 3rd Sri Lanka Light Infantry (commanded by Lt. Col. Naradha Wickramarathne and Maj. Sarath Fonseka) and the 3rd Gajaba Battalion was tasked with the main push into the Vadamarachchi, with elements of engineering units attached. Each brigade had 1500-2000 troops. The 1st Brigade was to move east along the coast from Thondamanaru, while 3rd Brigade moved eight miles south parallel to the 1st Brigade protecting its flank. A group of commandos were to be landed by helicopter in the south, south-west and the east coast of Vadamarachchi to prevent militants from escaping.

The 2nd Brigade under the command of Brig G. H. De Silva, who was also the overall commander, was tasked with diversionary action including forays from the besieged bases in Valikamam and the Jaffna fort, along with another column advancing from the south from Elephant Pass. Supporting the infantry, the army deployed the full strengths of its armored corps, which included Ferret, Alvis Saladin armoured cars and Alvis Saracen APCs, along with 76mm mountain guns, 85mm Type 60 and 25 pounder field guns of the Sri Lanka Artillery along with 120mm heavy mortars. The Sri Lanka Air Force mustered six SIAI-Marchetti in ground attack role, two Bell 212 helicopters in gunship role and one Hawker Siddeley HS 748, two Harbin Y-12s, one de Havilland Heron as improvised bombers. Two Hawker Siddeley HS 748, two Harbin Y-12s and one de Havilland DH.104 Dove were deployed as transports along with eight helicopters of Bell 212 and Bell 412 type.

One Harbin Y-12 was dedicated for casualty evacuation, as medical evacuation received high priority. This was the largest assembling of aircraft for any operation so far. The Sri Lanka Navy deployed its Shanghai class fast gunboats for naval bombardment and an array of smaller vessels for coastal operations enforcing an exclusion zone around the coast of Vadamarachchi.

On Good Friday, 17 April 1987, the LTTE carried out the Aluth Oya massacre, killing 127 civilians, including children and women. This was followed four days later by a massive car bomb blast near the central bus stand in Pettah, Colombo, which resulted in 113 deaths of civilians.

== Pre-operation phase ==
The army began probing attacks days prior to the main operation, while air attacks targeted militants in Valikamam following the Pettah bomb blast. On 18 May the army made several forays from its camps in Palai, Thondamanaru, Kurumbasiddy, Kattuvan and Navatkiuli. In one of these forays the army killed LTTE Jaffna District leader Anthony Kaththiar (alias Radha), who had carried out the Anuradhapura massacre.

== Phase one ==
The offensive started on the morning of 26 May 1987, with air force helicopters dropping sticks of special forces across the lagoon to block exit points from Vadamarachchi, which the militants could try to take. They dug in, awaiting the progress of the main operation. Another unit of commandos was dropped on the beach around Manalkadu to prevent any escape to the sea, where the navy had deployed its gunboats. At first light, air force planes dropped leaflets advising the civilian population to take shelter in designated safe zones, and a dusk-to-dawn curfew was enforced across the peninsula. An hour later the air force sent in its ground attack aircraft and bombers.

At 8:30 am 1st Brigade and 3rd Brigade began their move to their designated objectives against heavy opposition, with the cover of artillery, mortar and naval fire support. At the same time diversionary action was undertaken by the 2nd Brigade Group. It was difficult for the troops to break out from the Thondamanaru area because LTTE forces had blown up the Thondamanaru bridge months previously to delay government forces from reaching Valvettithurai, the birthplace of LTTE leader V. Prabhakaran. The infantry waded across the lagoon while the engineers prepared an alternative crossing for the armor. The eastern side of Thondamanaru was heavily mined by the LTTE; the advance company under Capt. Bahar Morseth took the brunt, with the lead platoon losing 90% of its men in the first half-hour. The command vehicle of the 1st Gajaba Battalion was blown up by a land mine, but the battalion commander was on foot. Clearing of the mines and booby traps were left to a 2nd Field Engineer Squadron of the Sri Lanka Engineers commanded by Maj. Lucky Rajasinghe. The first day of the battle depended mainly on the field engineer squadron, as sappers—constantly under fire—neutralized and removed mines and booby traps left by LTTE cadres. They lost 42 men in four hours and the squadron commanding officer, Maj. Rajasinghe, was wounded. The militants had set up clusters of mines connected to each other, tripping one set off a series, with one killing eight sappers. The sappers cleared a path across the minefield although under fire from LTTE bunkers, allowing the 1 Gajaba Regiment to move forward by the afternoon.

2nd Brigade had by now become active with forays from the camps in Valikamam and Jaffna fort, with two groups of commandos landing from the sea. To the south, a force advanced from Elephant Pass to Iyakachchi and then to Sornampattu, with the objective of reaching Chempionpattu to seal off the southern part of Vadamarachchi, which it achieved. The foray from the Jaffna fort, however, was turned back after heavy resistance from the militants led by LTTE Jaffna commander Kittu.

Following Thondamanaru, the army progress gathered steam and the LTTE withdrew, but the army units faced threats from land mines and booby traps set by the militants in anticipation of an attack by the army. Many houses were rigged to blow when attempting to enter; one such rigged explosion nearly killed Brig. Kobbekaduwa. Reaching the coast, troops from the 1st Brigade, defeating the defensive line commanded by LTTE leader Soosai, made a 90-degree turn undertaking a pincer movement to capture Valvettithurai. This resulted in a friendly fire incident that claimed the life of Capt. Shantha Wijesinghe, who had gained fame two years prior in successfully defending the Kokilai army camp in the first militant attack on an army encampment and received the first field promotion in the army.

The navy attempted a landing on the coast of Valvettithurai with limited success. A bridgehead was established but could not be expanded due to heavy resistance, with the use of technicals mounting .50-cal. machine guns and 40 mm grenade launchers. On 28 May the army managed to capture Udupiddy and Valvettithurai. The troops found bunkers in the town with strong concrete walls that withstood 37mm shells of the gunboats as well as a militant training camp and a workshop that manufactured mortars called "baba". Another column (commandos, under the command of Maj. Sarath Handapangoda) captured Nelliady and advanced towards Point Pedro without giving LTTE units time to regroup, with troops from Point Pedro breaking out to link up with the advancing formations. Following the capture of Valvettithurai, militant resistance melted.

By the first week of June government forces managed to gain control over the entire zone and captured large amounts of arms left behind by retreating LTTE forces. Military intelligence discovered that LTTE leader Prabakaran, along with then Vadamarachchi leader Soosai, narrowly escaped advancing troops. By 31 May the government declared that the Vadamarachchi region had been recaptured and several army camps were established.

== Phase two and Indian intervention ==
With the objective of Phase One achieved, the second stage of this operation was launched on June 3, 1987, with a thrust towards Achchuveli, the goal of which was to capture the city of Jaffna, less than 20 km away. Iddaikadu was captured and the militants fell back to Achchuveli Maha Vidyalayam, making a stand. The advance was halted here; Capt. Navaratne was hit by a rifle grenade. However, mortar fire from Thondamanaru broke the resistance and the troops captured Achchuveli. The pressure from the Indian government mounted.

The Indian government cracked down on LTTE operations in India in November 1986, but had requested the Sri Lankan government not to carry out any major offensives against the LTTE. At the start of the second phase, Sri Lankan listening posts intercepted LTTE communications urgently requesting their cadres in Tamil Nadu to request help to save them from complete destruction from the Chief Minister of Tamil Nadu. On pressure from the state government of Tamil Nadu, the Indian government demanded the cessation of the offensive, claiming it would end the suffering of the civilian population. President Jayewardene and Minister Athulathmudali were furious, as they saw this as a direct intervention by India in the internal matters of Sri Lanka, and a strong protest was lodged with the Indian High Commissioner in Colombo. The Indian government supported a flotilla of boats that sailed from Tamil Nadu, claiming it was bringing relief supplies. The Sri Lankan Navy intercepted the flotilla within Sri Lankan territorial waters. After the navy threatened to open fire if the boats crossed into Sri Lankan territorial waters, the flotilla turned back.

The Indian government responded by sending five An-32s of the Paratroop Training School escorted by Mirage 2000s of the No. 7 Squadron armed with Matra Magic II AAMs with the threat that "force" would be used if opposed by the Sri Lanka Air Force; 22 tons of what were claimed to be humanitarian relief supplies were dropped in the Jaffna area on June 4 in Operation Poomalai, in what was termed a violation of territorial sovereignty by Sri Lanka.

With the prospect of Indian intervention made clear by Operation Poomalai, President Jayewardene ordered a halt to the offensive and the second phase of the operation was abandoned. Indian forces landed in Sri Lanka on July 29 with the signing of the Indo-Sri-Lankan accord.

== Aftermath ==
Vadamarachchi campaign ribbon bar

Troop morale was at its highest peak with the success of the first phase and capture of the Vadamarachchi region. The abrupt halt of the second phase of the operation drastically affected morale of the troops involved, as the military and many in Sri Lanka believed victory was certain with the capture of Jaffna and the LTTE leadership that was trapped. This, many believed, was prevented by India with its intervention and show of force. Following the Indo-Sri Lankan accord, the Indian Peace Keeping Force arrived on the island to keep peace and the Sri Lankan Army withdrew to its camps in Jaffna. This initiated the 1987–1989 JVP insurrection in the south in the form of a low-intensity conflict with many targeted assassinations, resulting in the redeployment of army units to the south of the country.

The military had sustained the heaviest number of casualties suffered so far in a single operation undertaken by it, with 33 killed and 182 wounded. The defending LTTE fighting back from secure fortified positions lost 631 KIA. The government issued the Vadamarachchi Operation Medal for all those who participated in the offensive. Gerry De Silva and Lionel Balagalle went on to serve as the Commander of the Sri Lankan Army. Denzil Kobbekaduwa and Vijaya Wimalaratne, who gained fame in the offensive as its field commanders, went on to lead several more successful offensives until both were killed on August 8, 1992, while making preparations for an operation to recapture the Jaffna Peninsula. Some of the senior officers who participated in the offensive remained in the army, while others left, disillusioned by the Indo-Sri Lankan accord. Two officers who served as field officers in the operation, Sarath Fonseka and Gotabaya Rajapaksa, would play a major role as the Commander of the Sri Lankan Army and Defence Secretary in the later stages of the civil war in which the LTTE was completely defeated militarily. The Jaffna peninsula itself was completely captured in the successful Operation Riviresa in 1996.

== See also ==
- List of Sri Lankan Civil War battles
