= Denzil Kobbekaduwa =

Sri Lanka Army's senior officer

Lieutenant General Denzil Kobbekaduwa † RWP, RSP
- Denzil Kobbekaduwa in Major General insignia
- Born: 27 July 1940; Kandy, Ceylon
- Died: 8 August 1992 (aged 52) (DOW); Colombo General Hospital, Sri Lanka
- Military career
- Allegiance: Sri Lanka
- Branch: Sri Lanka Army
- Service years: 1960–1992 (DOW)
- Rank: Lieutenant general (posthumously awarded)
- Units: Sri Lanka Armoured Corps
- Commands: Northern Sector, Eastern Sector, 2nd Division, 1st Division; 3rd Brigade; 1st Reconnaissance Regiment
- Conflicts: 1971 Insurrection, Sri Lankan Civil War
- Awards: Rana Wickrama Padakkama; Rana Sura Padakkama; Vishista Seva Vibhushanaya; Uttama Seva Padakkama

Lieutenant General Denzil Lakshman Kobbekaduwa, RWP, RSP, VSV, USP (Sinhala: ඩෙන්සිල් ලක්ෂ්මණ් කොබ්බෑකඩුව; 27 July 1940 – 8 August 1992) was a senior Sri Lankan Army officer who served in the 1971 Insurrection and the Sri Lankan Civil War.

Having trained with the British Army, Kobbekaduwa started his military career as an armoured corps officer. He was suspended following an alleged Ceylonese coup d'état attempt in 1966 and was reinstated in 1970, attached to internal security prior to and during the 1971 Insurrection. Following a brief stint as an officer instructor, he served as a staff officer attached to several commands before commanding the 1st Reconnaissance Regiment, Sri Lanka Armoured Corps. In the mid-1980s he served as district military coordinating officer before joining the general staff of the Joint Operations Command. At Joint Operations Command, he led the planning of the Vadamarachchi Operation, during which he commanded one of the three brigades. He served as the general officer commanding of the 1st Division and the 2nd Division; Overall Operations Commander, Eastern Sector, before taking up command as Overall Operations Commander, Northern Sector. During this time he held several major military operations such as Operation Gajasinghe and Operation Balavegaya. He was killed on the eve of launching Operation Final Countdown to recapture the Jaffna Peninsula, when he was mortally wounded and much of his senior staff in his command killed when the Land Rover they were travelling in hit a landmine on the island of Kayts.

== Early life and education ==
He was born in Kandy to a Radala family. His father was Loku Bandara Kobbekaduwa and mother was Lona Ratwatte. He was their second child and eldest of three sons. He spent his early days at the Deldeniya Walauwa in the village of Deldeniya in Menikdiwela, Kadugannawa and at Amunugama Walauwa in the Amunugama village close to Kandy. His uncle was the politician Hector Kobbekaduwa.

He received his primary education at Hillwood College and in 1948 entered Trinity College Kandy. He represented the college at rugby, hockey, and cricket. He captained the College 1XV in 1959 and won the Trinity Lion for rugby and was a school prefect. Although he was offered admission to the University of Ceylon, Peradeniya he opted for a military career.

== Early career ==
Kobbekaduwa joined the Ceylon Army in May 1960 as an officer cadet. After undergoing basic training at the Army Training Center in Diyatalawa; he proceeded to the Royal Military Academy Sandhurst for officer training, along with G. H. De Silva and two other Ceylonese cadets in the 29th Intake. Returning to Ceylon in 1962, he was commissioned as a second lieutenant in the 1st Reconnaissance Regiment, Ceylon Armoured Corps. A few months later he returned to the United Kingdom to follow the regimental signal officers course. Promoted to lieutenant, he was attached to the Royal Armoured Corps training unit at Bovington Camp for a six months armoured fighting vehicle training course in 1964. Returning in 1965, he rejoined the 1st Reconnaissance Regiment.

== Suspension ==
In 1967, Kobbekaduwa was sent on compulsory leave following an alleged coup d'état attempt in which the commander of the Ceylon Army, Major General Richard Udugama, who was a Kandian and a kinsman of Kobbekaduwa was implicated. He spent his suspension focused on farming and rugby. Having played rugby in school, he played for the Army Sports Club in the Clifford Cup tournament and then represented Ceylon. Joining the Kandy Sports Club, he led the team to become runners-up to the Clifford Cup in 1969. He also coached his school and national rugby teams. Later he refereed and administered the game on a national level. He was also a board member of the Duncan White Sports Foundation.

== Marriage and family ==
While playing for the Kandy Sports Club, Kobbekaduwa met Lalini Ratwatte, younger daughter of Kenneth and Merle Ratwatte. They married in December 1970. They had two daughters and a son.

== Insurrection ==
Following the 1970 general elections in which another kinsman Sirima Bandaranaike was elected prime minister, Kobbekaduwa was cleared of all charges and reinstated to active service as a captain. Thereafter, he was attached to the newly formed Army's Field Security Detachment under the command of the recently promoted Lieutenant Colonel Anuruddha Ratwatte. The Field Security Detachment was tasked with identifying internal threats to and safeguarding the prime minister, following Bandaranaike's experience in the 1962 attempted coup d'état. Based on investigations by the military police unit under his command, Kobbekaduwa warned the government that a youth insurrection was imminent. The warnings materialized when the JVP insurrection started on 5 April 1971, taking the government and the military unprepared in its scale and magnitude. Soon after the start of the insurrection, Kobbekaduwa was placed in charge of the security of the Prime Minister Sirima Bandaranaike.

== Staff officer ==
He was promoted to the rank of major in June 1972 and was sent in 1975 to the British Army Staff College at Camberley to follow the command and staff course. Returning in 1976, he was posted to the Army Training Centre in Diyatalawa as an officer instructor and thereafter appointed as a staff officer at Army Headquarters. Following the government change in 1977, he was once again sent on compulsory leave but returned soon after to be posted to Jaffna as part of the Task Force Anti Illicit Immigration (TaFAII) which was ongoing since the early 1960s to counter illegal immigration from India. During his posting he was able to gain a good understanding of the Jaffna Peninsula during the onset of the Tamil militancy that led to the Sri Lankan Civil War. From March 1979, he served as principle staff officer to Brigadier Tissa Weeratunga, who was dispatched to Jaffna as Commander Security Forces - Jaffna, with extensive powers under the provisions of Prevention of Terrorism (Special Provisions) Act No: 48 of 1979. until December 1979. In 1980 he was a staff officer attached to Commander Security Forces - Jaffna. In April 1981, he was promoted to the rank of lieutenant colonel and the following year he was transferred to Army Headquarters as the general staff officer (Grade 1) of G branch.

== Field command ==
In June 1983, he took command of his parent regiment as commanding officer of the 1st Reconnaissance Regiment, Sri Lanka Armoured Corps. Based at Rock House Army Camp, he deployed his troops and armored vehicles in Colombo during the Black July riots in July 1983. In 1985, he was appointed military coordinating officer of the Vavuniya District and was promoted to the rank of colonel in September. In 1987 he was appointed military coordinating officer of the Trincomalee District, before transferring to the Joint Operations Command under the command of Lieutenant General Cyril Ranatunga.

=== Operation Liberation ===
"Operation Liberation", also known as the "Vadamarachchi Operation", was launched after months of planning on 26 May 1987. Brigadier Kobbekaduwa commanded the operation on the ground as the Brigade Commander of the 3 brigade group formed comprising two infantry brigades with supporting armored, artillery and air units of the Sri Lanka Air Force numbering 8000 personal. It was the largest formation deployed by the Sri Lankan Army at that point and the first conventional battle to take place in the civil war. The objective was to take the territory of Vadamarachchi in the Jaffna Peninsula from LTTE (Tamil Tiger) control. LTTE forces destroyed the bridge at Thondaimanaru to slow army progress towards Valvettithurai, the town of LTTE leader Prabhakaran's birth. On 28 May, army troops captured Udupiddy, Valvettithurai and Nelliady. By the end of the first week of June, the army had gained control over the entire zone and captured a large cache of arms left by the LTTE.

President J.R. Jayewardene and Minister of National Security Lalith Athulathmudali had political responsibility for the operation and terminated it following Operation Poomalai, the Indian air force's show of strength, in which it dropped supplies over Jaffna for the besieged Tamil Tigers on 4 June 1987, leading to the Indo-Sri Lanka Accord.

== Principal staff officer ==
In December 1987, he was appointed Principal staff officer of the Joint Operations Command and was nominated to attended the Royal College of Defence Studies. He turned down the nomination that year and accompanied President J. R. Jayewardene to Islamabad for the fourth SAARC summit in 1988. On his return he was sent to the Royal College of Defence Studies in 1989, only to be recalled during the middle of the course. However, he was quickly sent back once the British government questioned the recall mid-course.

== Higher command ==
On 1 January 1990, he was promoted to major general and was appointed as general officer commanding, 1st Division based at the Panagoda Cantonment.

With the resumption of hostilities in the Eelam War II or the second phase of the civil war with following the failure of peace talks in June 1990, Kobbekaduwa was transferred to the Eastern Province as Overall Operations Commander, Eastern Sector. In July he was appointed as general officer commanding, 2nd Division and Overall Operations Commander, Northern Sector directing military operations in the northern province with his headquarters based in Anuradhapura.

He launched operation "Operation Gajasinghe", withdrawing troops from Kilinochchi and strengthening the Army garrison at Elephant Pass, the critical land strip that linked the Jaffna peninsula with the mainland. New camps were set up around the main base, expanding its size. On 10 July 1991, Elephant Pass came under siege by an LTTE attack which it code-named "Operation Charles Anthony", its first suicide bomber. 800 troops of the 6th battalion, Sri Lanka Sinha Regiment held out.

=== Operation Balavegaya ===
At this point, Major General Kobbekaduwa proposed an amphibious assault launched code named Operation Balavegaya. Launching an amphibious assault for the first time in Sri Lankan military history, plans for Operation Balavegaya were drawn up at Joint Operations headquarters in Colombo. 8,000 troops were deployed for the rescue mission to relieve the besieged camp and regain territory captured by the LTTE. This was an amphibious operation using landing craft and helicopters to transport the soldiers.

During the operation the intensity of LTTE resistance led some battalion commanders to consider aborting the operation temporarily, however, General Kobbekaduwa and Brigadier Vijaya Wimalaratne decided it should proceed to join the troops at the front lines. On 14 July 1991 the task-force established a beachhead at (Vettilaikkerni). After several days of fighting the relief force was able to reach and linkup with the besieged garrison and by 19 August the LTTE militants withdrew. During the month-long battle which was the longest yet in the war, 573 LTTE carders and 202 military personnel had been killed. In the end of August, General Kobbekaduwa launched "Operation Lightning" in the Weli-oya sector to divert pressure on Elephant Pass. Several LTTE camps were destroyed while other operations disrupted LTTE supply lines in the area where the Mannar coast was linked to the Wanni jungle base.

== Death ==
=== Operation Final Count Down ===
In July 1992, General Kobbekaduwa returned to Colombo for his father's funeral. This was when he was preparing for a new offensive to capture the Jaffna peninsula which was under LTTE control, it was code named "Operation Final Count Down". On 2 August 1992 he was back in Colombo and met with President Ranasinghe Premadasa. He returned to his HQ in Palaly the next day. Since the launching pad for the offensive was the island of Kayts on 7 August, General Kobbekaduwa moved to Karainagar naval base by helicopter with his staff. He spent much of the night planning the upcoming offensive with Brigadier Vijaya Wimalaratne, Jaffna Brigade Commander and Commodore Mohan Jayamaha. Due to concerns of the navy about the staging area, it was decided to visit the Araly point the next day.

=== Araly Point ===
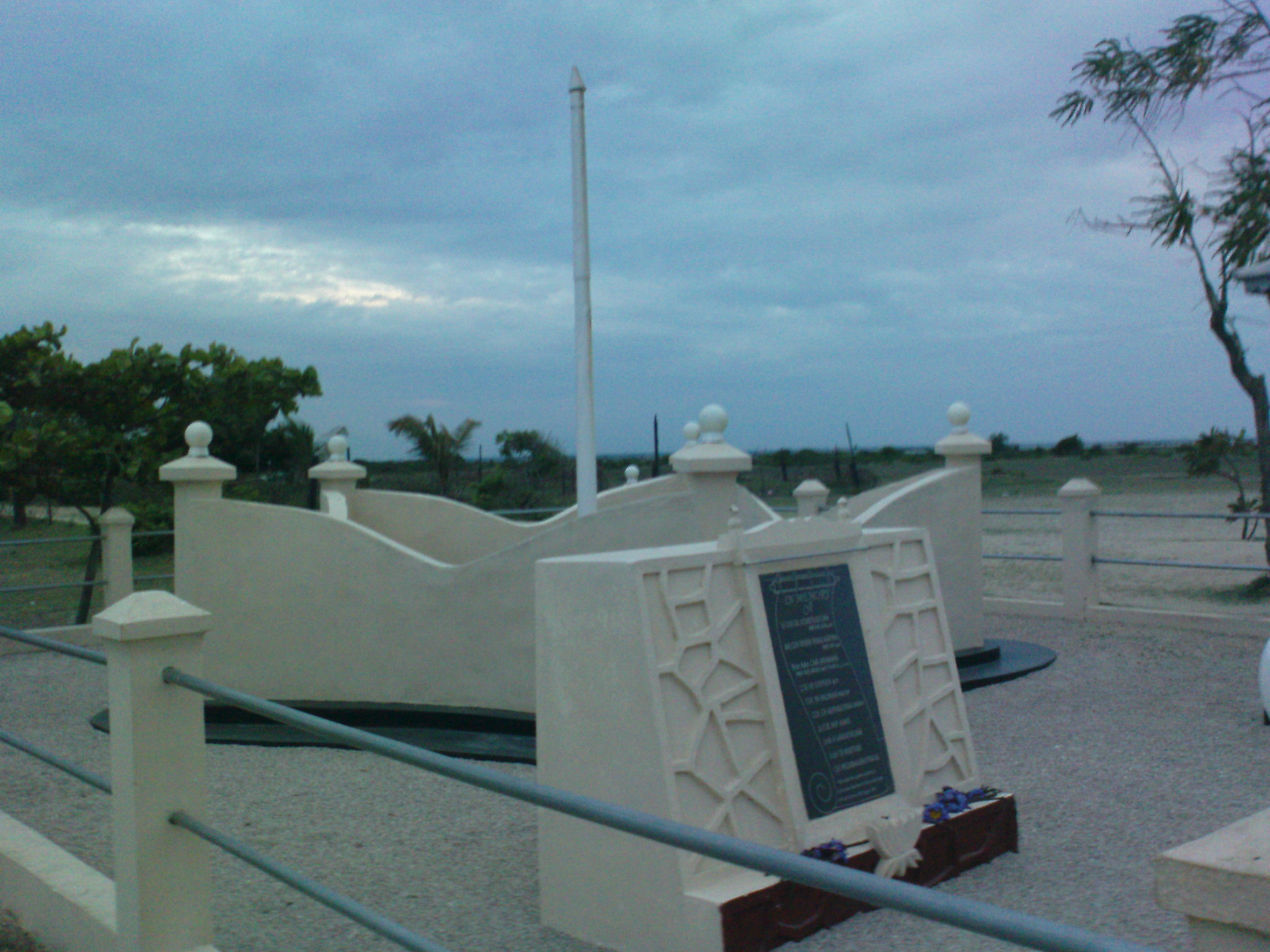
Lieutenant General Denzil Kobbekaduwa Memorial at Araly Point

On 8 August 1992 at 8.00 am the group made up of Maj. General Kobbekaduwa, Brigadier Wimalaratne and Commodore Jayamaha along with several other officers headed out on a naval patrol boat towards Jaffna and returned to Kayts pier. On returning the party was met by three Land Rovers, the General, the Brigadier and the Commodore got into the Land Rover UHA 8752 with the rest of the army personnel taking vehicle no UHA 8785 and the naval personnel taking 5959. From there they set out to Araly Point. Half way the general ordered that they all use one vehicle so as not to attract fire from LTTE units in the Jaffna peninsula which was only one-half kilometer away. They reached Araly Point and had a discussion and headed back when the Land Rover was consumed by an explosion. Major Rupasinghe and Major Induruwa who were 400 yards away from the incident ran to the location to find only General Kobbekaduwa and Commodore Jayamaha alive. Killed in the explosion was Brigadier Wimalaratne, Lt. Colonels G.H. Ariyaratne, A. Palipahana, H.R. Stephen, all three battalion commanders, Lieutenant Commander Asanga Lankathilaka, Lieutenant Commander C.B Wijepura, Major Nalin S. De Alwis; the General's Aide-de-camp and Corporal Jagath Wickramaratna. The two wounded officers were rushed to the helicopter waiting to transport the group to base, which took them to the military hospital in Plalay where Commodore Jayamaha was found dead on arrival. General Kobbekaduwa who was awake was then transferred to the Colombo General Hospital for surgery via helicopter; where a specialist team of surgeons were unable to save his life. It has been claimed by Jane's Information Group that the assassination was by the LTTE.

=== Funeral ===
On the day of his military funeral, a crowd numbering about 100,000 persons descended on the Colombo general cemetery, chanting anti-government slogans and throwing stones at government ministers. At least fifteen people were injured, including two ministers, deputy Foreign Minister John Amaratunga and deputy Information Minister A.J. Ranasinghe. According to witnesses, the crowd was angry because the general was not given a state funeral. Police in riot gear responded by firing shots and tear-gas into the air to disperse the crowd.

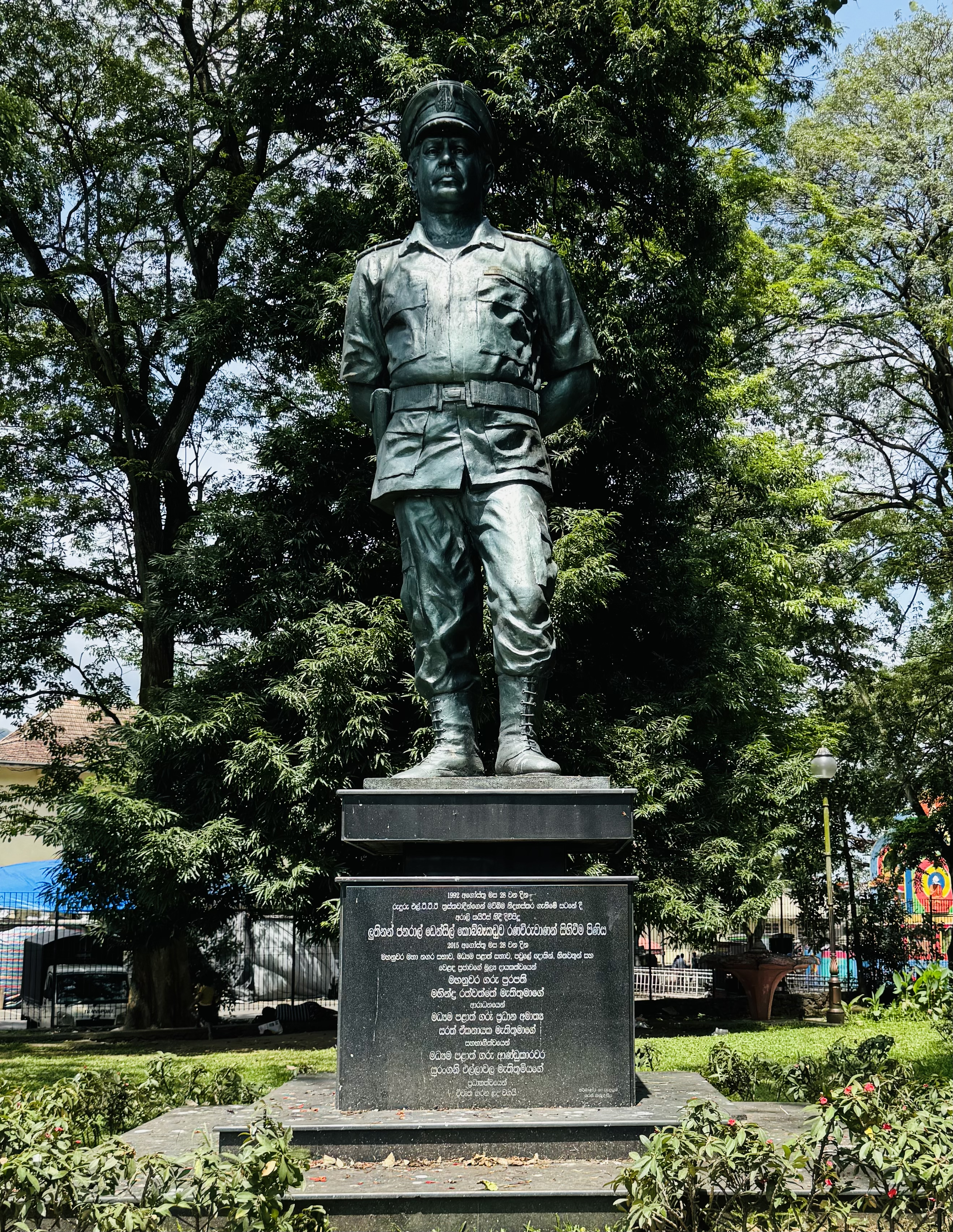
Denzil Kobbekaduwa Statue at Kandy

=== Commissions of inquiry ===
Lalini Kobbekaduwa, the General Kobbekaduwa's widow, called for an international commission into the incident. This was not granted, but the Sri Lankan Government set up their own commission to investigate. President Premadasa appointed a one man commission comprising Justice Ameer Ismail. Additional Solicitor General Upawansa Yapa was later appointed to assist. Following her election to office, President Chandrika Kumaratunga, appointed a Presidential Commission of Inquiry, made up of Tissa Dias Bandaranayake (Chair), Justice D. P. S. Gunasekera and Gamini Ameratunga, High Court Judge. Tissa Dias Bandaranayake was a close relative of the president. A witness, Rohini Hathurusinghe gave evidence that Major General Vijaya Wimalaratne and Major General Ananda Weerasekara conspired to kill Kobbekaduwa with a bomb planted in his jeep, which caused a major national scandal. A report from the Criminal Investigation Department found Hathurusinghe's evidence could not be corroborated, yet Bandaranayake allowed her testimony. Justice Gunasekera and Ameratunga resigned from the commission. Televised, the commissioned became a media sensation and a statue of Wimalaratne was destroyed by a mob. Hathurusinghe changed her story and accused the Chairmen of the commission of getting her to falsely accuse the army officers. Although the validity of Hathurusinghe's evidence was questioned, the Presidential Commission speculated that then President Ranasinghe Premadasa, as well as members of the Sri Lankan Army such as Major W A N M Weerasinghe, were "directly responsible" for his death. The Asia Times commented that "a second and last Presidential Commission came up with highly speculative conclusions."

== Legacy ==
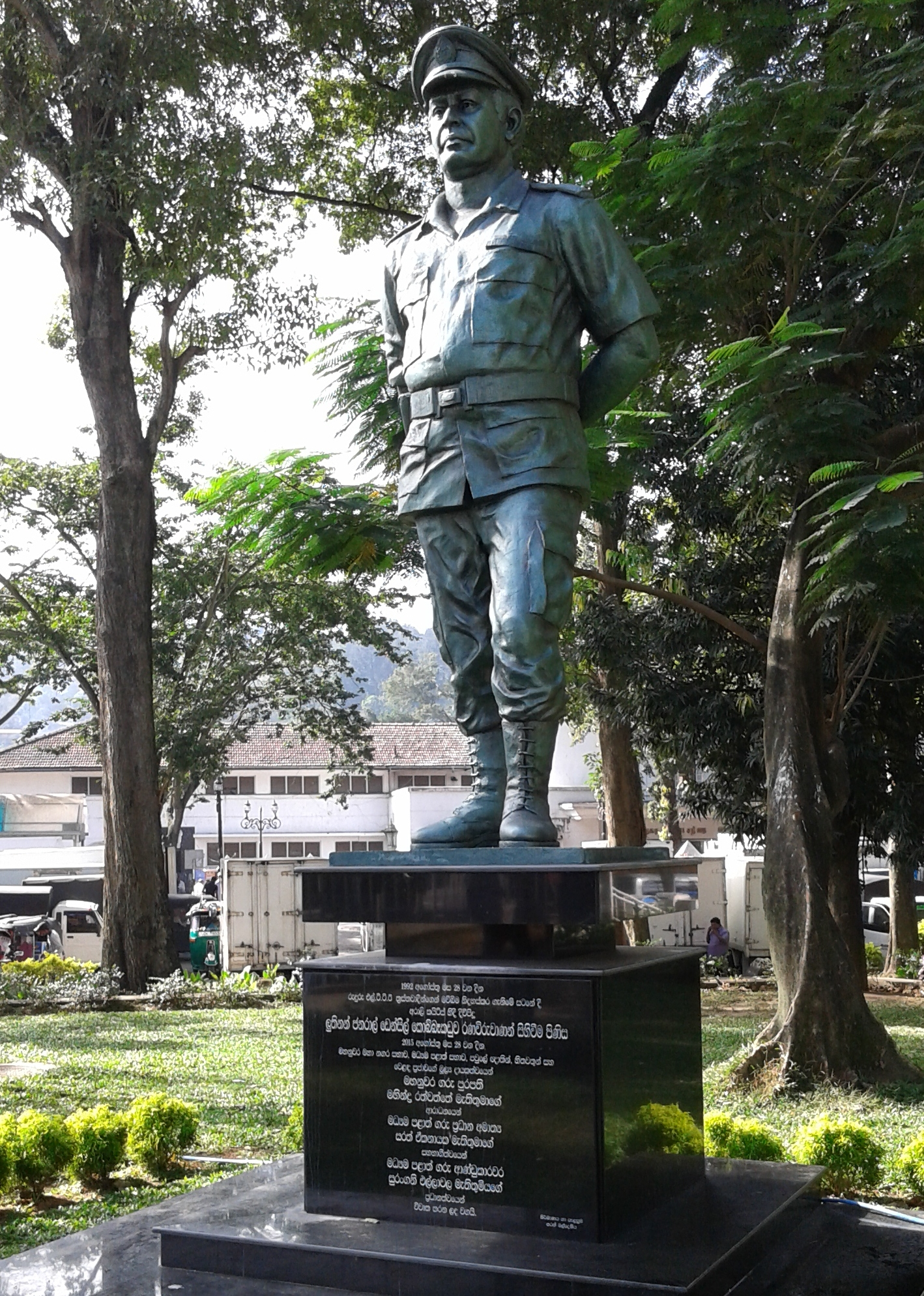
Lieutenant General Denzil Lakshman Kobbekaduwa Statue at Kandy.

General Kobbekaduwa is considered as a loved and respectfully leader among Sri Lankan Army and the entire Sri Lankan community. He was admired for his kindness, humanity and his affection for his troops. Several statues of General Kobbekaduwa were erected following his death, along with several roads named after him.

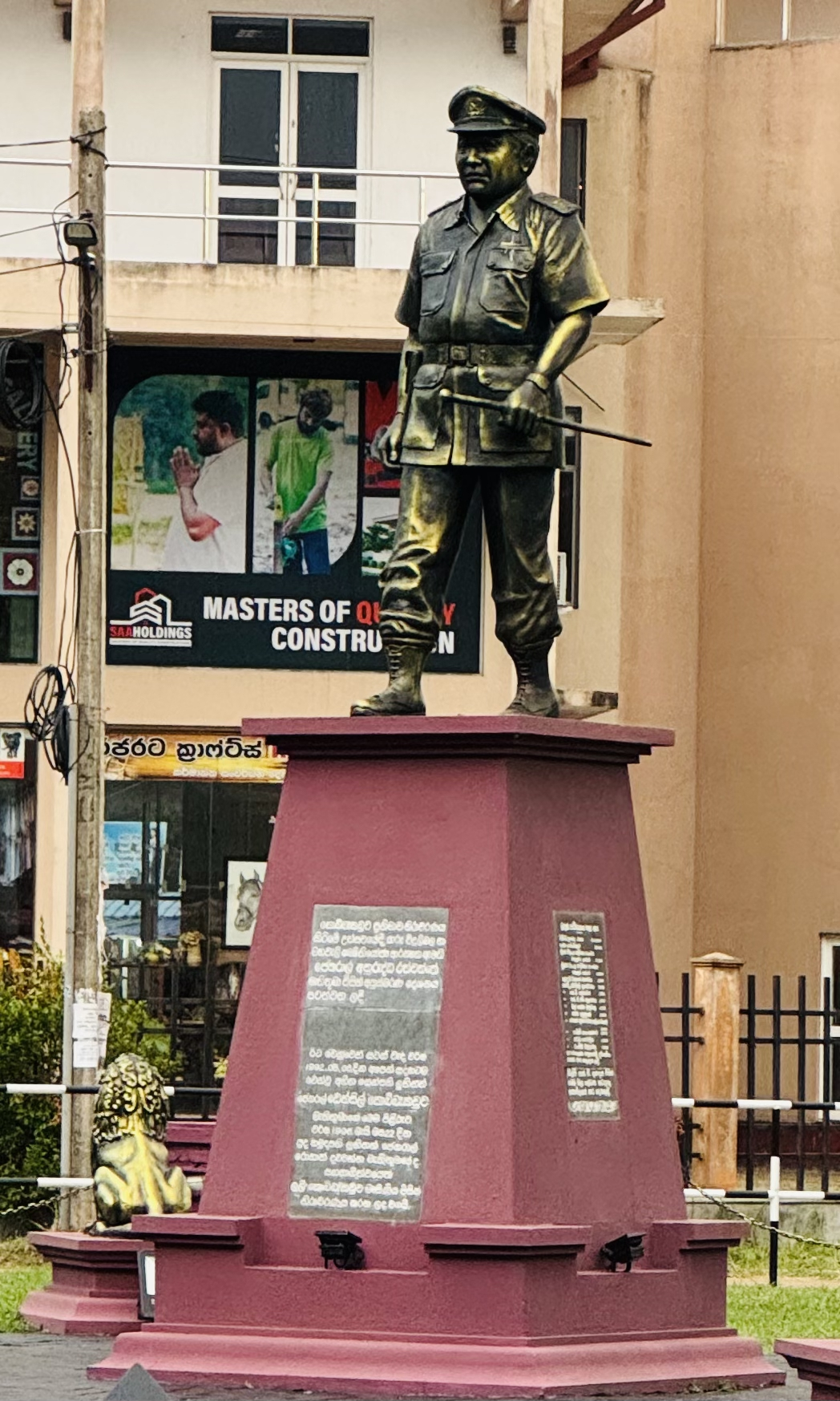
Denzil Kobbekaduwa Statue at Anuradhapura

Sri Lankan balladeer Anton Jones sung a song dedicated to the late general.

== Awards and decorations ==
During his career he received the Republic of Sri Lanka Armed Services Medal, Sri Lanka Army 25th Anniversary Medal, President's Inauguration Medal, Sri Lanka Armed Services Long Service Medal, Vadamarachchi Operation Medal, Purna Bhumi Padakkama and Rana Wickrama Padakkama. He was posthumously promoted to the rank of lieutenant general and awarded the Vishista Seva Vibhushanaya, Rana Sura Padakkama (twice), Uttama Seva Padakkama and Desha Putra Sammanaya. His widow received the Uththama Pooja Pranama Padakkama medal in 2010.

Rana Wickrama Padakkama	Rana Sura Padakkama		Vishista Seva Vibhushanaya
Uttama Seva Padakkama	Republic of Sri Lanka Armed Services Medal	Sri Lanka Army 25th Anniversary Medal	President's Inauguration Medal
Sri Lanka Armed Services Long Service Medal	Desha Putra Sammanaya	Purna Bhumi Padakkama	Vadamarachchi Operation Medal

== See also ==
- Eelam War I
