= Operation Balavegaya =

Sri Lankan combined military operation

- Part of Sri Lankan Civil War
Date	14 July – 9 August 1991 (26 days)
Location	Jaffna, Sri Lanka
Result	Sri Lankan victory

Belligerents
Sri Lanka Army Sri Lanka Navy	Liberation Tigers of Tamil Eelam

Commanders and leaders
Maj. Gen. (later Lt. Gen.) Denzil Kobbekaduwa; Brig. (later Maj. Gen.) Vijaya Wimalaratne; Captain H. R. Amaraweera (later Rear Admiral) - Commander Northern Naval Area.	Velupillai Pirabakaran

Strength
10,000	6,000

Casualties and losses
202–400 killed	573–1,000+ killed

Operation Balavegaya (Operation Power Force) was a combined military operation launched by the Sri Lankan military in Jaffna, the largest amphibious assault in its history. Operation Balavegaya was launched in response to the siege of Elephant Pass by the LTTE. It is believed that Operation Balavegaya was the largest and most successful military operation of the Sri Lankan military until Operation Riviresa in 1995.

== Background ==
In July 1990, when Maj. Gen. Denzil Kobbekaduwa took charge as commanding officer of Northern Operations, he instituted an operation code-named "Operation Gajasinghe" to pull out troops from Kilinochchi and strengthen the camp at Elephant Pass. He also established a temporary camp at Paranthan, north of Paranthan junction, for obtaining fresh water for the camp at Elephant Pass. Subsequently, Elephant Pass camp was expanded and transformed into a massive military complex, with a main base and four mini-camps, within a stretch of land three miles in diameter. At one time the Elephant Pass base and the satellite camps covered an area about 23 kilometers long and nearly 10 kilometers wide. About 800 troops of the 6th Battalion of the Sri Lanka Sinha Regiment occupied the installations.

== Battle for Elephant Pass ==
The first Parama Weera Vibhushanaya, awarded posthumously, during the battle to Cpl. Gamini Kularatne of the Elephant Pass Garrison.

On the 10th of July 1991 the army camp located at strategically important Elephant Pass came under siege by the LTTE. The army base commanded by Maj. (later Maj. Gen.) Sanath Karunaratne defended the camp. At that time the battle for Elephant Pass was the largest offensive operation of the LTTE. It began its first assault on the camp from the south of Elephant Pass. On the very first day LTTE attacked the camp at dawn and was supported by armor-plated bulldozers. Heavy mortars, machine guns and whatever available firepower the LTTE had was thrown into battle. Hundreds of fighters attempted to storm the defenses of the camp in wave after wave of attacks. Only a small portion of the southern defences fell into LTTE hands.

At this juncture Lance Cpl. Gamini Kularatne of the 6th Battalion of the Sri Lanka Sinha Regiment managed to climb on top of an advancing bulldozer and lobbed a grenade into it with total disregard of his own life. He was killed during this action but the bulldozer which would have caused much destruction was immobilized. Cpl. Kularatne was posthumously the first recipient of the Parama Weera Vibhushanaya, the highest gallantry medal in the Sri Lankan Armed Forces.

On the second day Maj. Lalith Buddhadasa, the second in command of the base, was killed along with several other soldiers by a mortar attack. Attempts by the Sri Lankan Air Force to land helicopters inside the base proved futile, due to the heavy AA gunfire of the Tigers. The LTTE by then had surrounded the base and was closing in from all directions. The main thrust was from the south and there were attempts to penetrate the defenses with earth-moving vehicles and artillery fire on the outer defense positions. However, the Sri Lankan Army, which fought valiantly, foiled the LTTE's attempts. Eventually the Rest House camp in the southern sector of the base fell into the hands of the LTTE. Sustaining heavy losses, Sri Lankan troops fell back to the rear positions.

"Prabhakaran openly declared that he had waged the 'Mother of all Battles'. He was very confident of victory. Troops were running short of ammunition, food and medicine. Many airdrops were carried out and about 60% of the airdrops fell within the camp premises. Fierce fighting continued for four days and the LTTE forces, both male and female cadres, continued their relentless onslaught on the southern and northern sectors of Elephant Pass despite mounting casualties. The entrapped Sri Lankan soldiers were completely surrounded and fought for their lives.

== Operation Balavegaya I ==
To break the siege and reinforce the Elephant Pass camp, Maj. Gen. Kobbekaduwa, the GOC of the 2nd Division, along with Brig. Vijaya Wimalaratne as Amphibious Task Force Commander launched "Operation Balavegaya", an amphibious operation since there was no cleared land route available to ensure speedy reinforcement. The army drew up this massive operation to include a force of 10,000 soldiers, which consisted of several battle-hardened and experienced regiments that included battalions from the Sri Lanka Light Infantry (SLLI), Sri Lanka Sinha Regiment(SLSR), Gemunu Watch (GW), the Gajaba Regiment (GR) supported by the Sri Lanka Armoured Corps (SLAC) and the Sri Lanka Artillery.

The troops of the 2nd Division, commanded by Maj. Gen. Kobbekaduwa, were moved to Pullimodai from the Trincomalee Naval base and made up the amphibious Task Force, commanded by Brig. Vijaya Wimalaratne, consisting of 1st Brigade (Col. Anton Wijendra) and 3rd Brigade (Col. Sarath Fonseka). A flotilla of ships made up of landing craft, gunboats and fast attack crafts of the Sri Lanka Navy under the command of Rear Adm. Quitus Wickramaratne transported the troops. Maj. Gen. Kobbekaduwa was present on board the flagship SLNS Wickrama with troops from the 3rd Battalion, SLLI (Lt. Col. Gamini Jayasundera) and 3rd Battalion, GR (Lt. Col. Seevali Wanigasekera) and Brig. Vijaya Wimalaratne was on the SLNS Edithara with Capt. H.R. Amaraweera, who commanded the flotilla, and Group Capt. Dick Sally, who co-ordinated the air operations.

The first attempt at a seaborne landing at Vettilakerni, located 12 kilometers east of Elephant Pass, scheduled for 14:30 hours on July 15, 1991, met with stiff resistance, causing Brig. Wimalaratne to delaly the landing. With his personal effort, the second attempt was made at 18:00 hours under cover of fire from Navy gunboats and close air support from air force Sia Marchetti SF-260 bombers directed by Wing Cmdr. Sunil Cabral. The first wave landed, led by Capt. Dushan Rajaguru, Coy Comd 1 SLSR, and Capt. Ralf Nugera, Coy Comd 3 SLLI, meeting heavy resistance, yet the 1st Battalion 1 SLSR and 3rd Battalion SLLI secured a beachhead that night. Within 24 hours the remaining units of the 1st Brigade and the 3rd Brigade landed. Thereafter arrived a holding brigade under the command of Col. Devinda Kalupahana. Once the beachhead was securely established, Gen. Kobbekaduwa authorized Brig. Wimalaratne to begin the operation to link up with the garrison in Elephant Pass, which was about 10 km away.

"Many terrorists were killed and large stocks of arms and ammunition captured from the terrorists. There was an intense fighting near the Mulliyan Kovil, northwest of Vettilaikerni. The reason was that the terrorists were determined to recover a stock of gold hidden near the Kovil [Temple]. In fact, the terrorists managed to evict the troops from Kovil area for a short while by counterattacking. They managed to take the gold away." - A Soldier's Version by Maj. Gen. Sarath Munasinghe - pages 115–116.

The terrain consisted of sand dunes, dotted with thorny scrub and Palmyra palms, an area that did not provide any natural cover against aerial, naval and artillery bombardment. Therefore, the confrontation assumed the character of a conventional warfare, with the combatants facing each other in open battle. It took nearly 18 days for Sri Lankan troops to fight their way on the 12-kilometer stretch to reach the Elephant Pass base, due to heavy resistance and minefields.

On the third week of fighting a squadron of Alvis Saladin armored cars of the 1st Reconnaissance Regiment, SLAC commanded by Maj. Shiran Jinasena broke through enemy lines despite two of its vehicles being destroyed by mines. The breakthrough was followed up by Saladin and Saracen APCs of the 1st Reconnaissance Regiment and 3rd Reconnaissance Regiment of the Armored Corps and Buffel APCs. The armored thrust on 2 August was led by Maj. Jinasena and was followed by Maj. Rohan De Silva of 4/GR, who commanded a squadron of Buffel APCs. At this point the three infantry brigades under Brig. Wimalarathna, which included the newly arrived 7th Brigade under Col. Gamini Angammana, went into action.

On the 4th of August forward elements of the Task Force reached the beleaguered garrison, singing the battle song Hela Jathika Abhimane.

According to Adele Ann Balasingham, an LTTE operative, "It took exactly 18 days for the several battalions of Sri Lankan army troops, who landed along the Vadamaradchy eastern coast in a massive rescue operation, to reach the besieged Elephant Pass base". To advance the 12-kilometer distance, the Sinhala regiments, backed by heavy armor and air cover, had to engage in fierce clashes with the LTTE and fight for every inch of land. The fighting continued in that area until August 9, when the battered LTTE forces made a tactical withdrawal.

== Aftermath ==
The LTTE suffered heavy casualties—573 Tamil Tigers including 123 women fighters were killed (according to Adele Ann Balasingham) in the battle. According to official government figures, 202 army personnel were killed in the battle to retain Elephant Pass base. There were no official figures of the injuries sustained by the armed forces. Maj. Gen. Sarath Munasinghe, at that time the Sri Lankan army spokesman—and who wrote "A Soldier's Version" after his retirement—writes, "On 4 August 1991, I was lucky to personally witness the link-up with the EPS camp. It was the biggest victory ever over the LTTE at that time. There was joy and smiles all over. Prabhakaran's much publicized 'Mother of all Battles' was defeated. 202 valiant men including some prominent officers had laid their lives. Over one thousand terrorists were killed at EPS and during the operation to link up. Many citizens voluntarily sent in sweets, chutney, cigarettes and many other food items to the soldiers in the battlefield. There were banners and posters praising the soldiers in many parts of the country.".
