= Keteriya =

Ancient weapon

The keteriya is a form of battle axe that was used in ancient Sri Lanka. A keteriya would consist of a single edge and a short handle made of wood, traditionally resembling a hatchet with a straight shaft. This would allow the user to wield it with a single hand. Commonly used as a weapon and a tool, it is still common in rural villages. Legend has it that it was the preferred weapon of the famous warrior King Gajabahu the First; as such it is part of the cap badge of the Gajaba Regiment of the Sri Lanka Army.

== See also ==
- Tomahawk (axe)
