= Gajaba Regiment =

- ගජබා රෙජිමේන්තුව
- Cap badge of the Gajaba Regiment
- Active: 14 October 1983 – Present
- Country: Sri Lanka
- Branch: Sri Lanka Army
- Type: Infantry
- Role: Infantry warfare
- Size: 13 regular battalions 4 volunteer battalion
- Regimental Centre: Saliyapura Camp, Anuradhapura.
- Nickname: Keterians (Battle Axes)
- Motto: ‘Samagiya Shakthiyai' (Unity is Strength)
- Colors: Light green
- Anniversaries: 14 October (Regimental day)
- Engagements: Sri Lankan Civil War; 1987–1989 JVP insurrection United Nations Stabilization Mission in Haiti
- Decorations: 4 Parama Weera Vibhushanaya; 65 Weera Wickrama Vibhushanaya; 774 Rana Wickrama Padakkama; 3919 Rana Sura Padakkama
- Website: https://alt.army.lk/gajabaregiment/

Commanders
- Centre Commandant: Brigadier Roshan Kalupahana RSP USP
- Colonel of the Regiment: Major General UKDDP Udugama RWP RSP USP ndc psc
- Notable commanders: Major General Vijaya Wimalaratne

Insignia
- Flag

The Gajaba Regiment (GR) is an elite infantry regiment of the Sri Lankan Army. Formed on 14 October 1983 at the Saliyapura Camp in Anuradhapura, it is named after the famous Sinhalese King Gajabahu the First. It consists of 14 regular battalions and 6 volunteer battalions.

== History ==
The 1st battalion, Gajaba Regiment was formed on 14 October 1983 with the amalgamation of officers and men of the 1st Rajarata Rifles and the 1st Vijayabahu Infantry Regiment, under the command of Lieutenant Colonel Vijaya Wimalaratne at Saliyapura Camp with a strength of 36 officers and 752 other ranks. The 2/3 (Volunteer) Rajarata Rifles was reconstituted as the 2nd (Volunteer) battalion, Gajaba Battalion at Fort Fredrick in Trincomalee on the 14 October 1983 under the command of the Lieutenant Colonel W.R. Wijerathna. The Cap badge of the Gajaba Regiment was designed with a shield, two Keteri (battle axes) and a Kandian powder flask. The newly formed regular infantry battalion was deployed for internal security duties in the Jaffna Peninsula from 1983 to 1984 and again in 1985, where it sustained casualties in counter-insurgency operations. With the escalation of the Sri Lankan Civil War and Sri Lanka Army expanded and to cope with the demand of operational needs, a multi-battalion structure was introduced. A second regular infantry battalion was formed as the 3rd battalion in January 1986. Both regular battalions took part in the Vadamarachchi Operation in May 1987. With the start of the 1987–1989 JVP insurrection, both regular and volunteer units of the regiment were deployed in the southern part of the island for counter-insurgency operations. The regiment took part in all major offensives of the civil war and was involved in many major battles were the Gajaba units involved suffered over 80% casualty rates such as the 3rd battalion (149 killed and 115 missing) in the Battle of Pooneryn and the 8th battalion in the Second Battle of Elephant Pass. By the end of the Sri Lankan Civil War, the regiment had 27 battalions and 3,500 of its officers and men had been killed in action.

The regiment was awarded President's colours by President Mahinda Rajapakse on 11 January 2007. In 2008 a detachment from the regiment was sent to take part in the United Nations Stabilization Mission in Haiti.

== Sports ==
Gajaba Supercross

Since 1999, the Gajaba Regiment organizes the annual Gajaba Supercross in association with the Sri Lanka Association of Racing Drivers and Riders.

Gajaba Cricket

In 2021 the regiment built the Gotabaya Rajapaksa Cricket Stadium commissioned Thisara Perera as an officer.

== Units ==
No	Unit	Formed	Formed at	Disbanded	First commanding officer	Notes
1	1st Battalion, Sri Lanka Gajaba Regiment	14 October 1983	Saliyapura Camp		Lieutenant Colonel Vijaya Wimalaratne	This Battalion was established amalgamating the 1st Rajarata Rifle battalion and 1st Vijayabahu Infantry Regiment
2	2nd (V) Battalion, Sri Lanka Gajaba Regiment	14 October 1983	Fort Fredrieck, Trincomalee		Lieutenant Colonel W.R. Wijerathna	Disbanded 2nd Rajarata Rifles was re-activated and re-designated as 2nd (V) Battalion, Sri Lanka Gajaba Regiment.
3	3rd Battalion, Sri Lanka Gajaba Regiment	12 January 1986			Major S.T.T. Jayasundara	
4	4th Battalion, Sri Lanka Gajaba Regiment	17 August 1987	Siddapura, Punani in Batticaloa District		Lieutenant Colonel N. Rathnayake	Later converted to 3rd Mechanized Infantry Regiment. From 23 November 2022, 24th Battalion, Sri Lanka Gajaba Regiment Re-designationed as 4th Battalion the Gajaba Regiment
5	5th (V) Battalion, Sri Lanka Gajaba Regiment	3 March 1989	Colombo		Lieutenant Colonel P.C. Premachandra	
6	6th Battalion, Sri Lanka Gajaba Regiment	17 May 1990	Saliyapura, Anuradhapura		Lieutenant Colonel T.W. Jayawardana	
7	7th (V) Battalion, Sri Lanka Gajaba Regiment	14 December1990	Pankulam, Moravewa, Trincomalee District		Lieutenant Colonel A.D.J.P. Suraweera	
8	8th Battalion, Sri Lanka Gajaba Regiment	17 December 1992	Saliyapura Camp		Major T.B. Moseth	Later merged with 1st Gajaba Regiment on 4 June 2000 and later on 20 June 2001, the 8th Battalion Gajaba Regiment, was re- established at Saliyapura camp under Major H.R.N. Fernando.
9	9th Battalion, Sri Lanka Gajaba Regiment	8 March 1993			Lieutenant Colonel A.D. Subasinghe	Later merged with 4th Gajaba Regiment on 1 June 2000 and later on 4 February 2004, the 9th Battalion Gajaba Regiment, was re- established at Saliyapura camp under Lieutenant Colonel G.S.B. Thenne.
10	10th Battalion, Sri Lanka Gajaba Regiment	7 January 1994	Saliyapura		Major N.A.J.C. Dias	
11	11th (V) Battalion, Sri Lanka Gajaba Regiment	21 April 1994	Horowupothana		Lieutenant Colonel H.H.L. DE Silva	
12	12th Battalion, Sri Lanka Gajaba Regiment	8 October 2007			Lieutenant Colonel N.D.S.P. Niwnhella	
13	14th Battalion, Sri Lanka Gajaba Regiment	27 December 1997			Major N.A. Dharmarathna	
14	15th (V) Battalion, Sri Lanka Gajaba Regiment	23 January 1997	Meegalewa Bongama		Major B. Ediriweera	
15	16th Battalion, Sri Lanka Gajaba Regiment	22 October 2008	Illuppukadaweli Government School		Major K.P.S.A. Fenando	
16	17th (V) Battalion, Sri Lanka Gajaba Regiment	1 December 2007	Horowpathana		Major V.S. Kumarawansa	
17	18th (V) Battalion, Sri Lanka Gajaba Regiment	30 March 2008		4 September 2018		
18	19th (V) Battalion, Sri Lanka Gajaba Regiment	25 September 2008		25 August 2018		
19	20th Battalion, Sri Lanka Gajaba Regiment	5 December 2008			Major R.M.A.B. Rathnayaka	
20	21st (V) Battalion, Sri Lanka Gajaba Regiment	25 March 2009		7 April 2012		
21	22nd Battalion, Sri Lanka Gajaba Regiment	3 July 2009	Saliyapura Anuradhapura		Lieutenant Colonel D.R.N. Hettiarachchi	
22	23rd Battalion, Sri Lanka Gajaba Regiment	18 August 2009	Gajaba Regiment Center	20 July 2023	Lieutenant Colonel K.P.S.A. Fernando	
23	24th Battalion, Sri Lanka Gajaba Regiment	18 October 2009	Saliyapura Anuradhapura		Major D.U.N. Serasingha	From 23 November 2022 Re-designationed as 4th battalion the Gajaba Regiment
24	25th (V) Battalion, Sri Lanka Gajaba Regiment	10 November 2009		29 February 2012		
25	26th Battalion, Sri Lanka Gajaba Regiment	1 November 2009	Kalmadukulam	??	Lieutenant Colonel W M S N Eragoda	
26	HQ Battalion of Gajaba Regiment	27 May 1993			Major D.J.I. Peramunu Gamage	

== Recipient of the Parama Weera Vibhushanaya ==
- Lieutenant K. W. T. Nissanka †
- Warrant Officer II H.B. Pasan Gunasekera †
- Captain P. N. Punsiri †
- Major W.M.I.S.B. Walisundara †

== Commanders ==
- General Shavendra Silva, WWV, RWP, RSP, VSV, USP, ndc, psc – 23rd Commander of the Sri Lanka Army
- General Vikum Liyanage, RWP, RSP, USP, – 24th Commander of the Sri Lanka Army

== Chiefs of Staff ==
- Major General U.B.L. Fernando – 39th Chief of Staff of the Sri Lanka Army
- Major General W.H.K.S Peiris – 63rd Chief of Staff of the Sri Lanka Army
- Major General Chandana Wickramasinghe – 66th Chief of Staff of the Sri Lanka Army

== Deputy Chiefs of Staff ==
- Major General S. T. T. (Sathis) Jayasundera – 8th Deputy Chief of Staff of the Sri Lanka Army
- Major General K.A.S. Perera – 25th Deputy Chief of Staff of the Sri Lanka Army
- Major General Nirmal Dharmaratne – 32nd Deputy Chief of Staff of the Sri Lanka Army
- Major General Rasika Fernando – 33rd Deputy Chief of Staff of the Sri Lanka Army
- Major General C.D Ranasinghe – 41st Deputy Chief of Staff of the Sri Lanka Army
- Major General Chandana Wickramasinghe – 45st Deputy Chief of Staff of the Sri Lanka Army

== Notable members ==
- Major General Vijaya Wimalaratne, RWP, RSP, VSP, USP † – Founder of the Gajaba Regiment.Commander Security Forces Headquarters Jaffna (SF HQ (J)).
- Lieutenant Colonel Gotabhaya Rajapaksa, RWP, RSP – 8th President of Sri Lanka
- General Kamal Gunaratne, WWV, RWP, RSP, USP, ndc, psc – Permanent Secretary to the Ministry of Defense and GOC 53rd division in Eelam war IV
- Major General Sumedha Perera, WWV, RWP, RSP, USP, ndc – Permanent Secretary to the Ministry of Mahaweli, Agriculture, Irrigation & Rural Development
- Major General Jagath Dias, WWV, RWP, RSP, USP, ndc – Adjutant General of Sri Lanka Army and GOC 57th division in Eelam war IV
- Major General Seevali Wanigasekara RWP, RSP VSV, USP, psc
- Major Shantha Wijesinghe † – commanded the defense of Kokkilai and gained the first Battlefield promotion in the army
- Warrant Officer I Dinesh Priyantha – Sri Lankan paralympic track and field athlete
- Sergeant Maheesh Theekshana – Sri Lanka National Cricketer
- Corporal Ranjith Premasiri Madalana † – Sri Lankan army sniper

== Order of precedence ==
Preceded by Gemunu Watch	Order of Precedence	Succeeded by Vijayabahu Infantry Regiment

== See also ==
- Sri Lanka Army

== External links and sources ==
- Sri Lanka Army
- Gajaba Regiment
