= Mohan Jayamaha =

Sri Lankan admiral

Rear admiral Mohan Jayamaha † RWP, VSV, USP
- Born: 12 January 1949; Colombo, Sri Lanka
- Died: 8 August 1992 (aged 43); Jaffna, Sri Lanka
- Military career
- Allegiance: Sri Lanka
- Branch: Sri Lanka Navy
- Service years: 23 years
- Rank: Rear admiral
- Commands: Commander, Northern Naval Area, Commander, Western Naval Area
- Conflicts: Sri Lankan Civil War
- Awards: Rana Wickrama Padakkama; Vishista Seva Vibhushanaya; Uttama Seva Padakkama

Rear admiral Conan Anthony Mohan Jayamaha, RWP, VSV, USP, psc, SLN (12 January 1949–8 August 1992 †) was a Sri Lankan Admiral. He was Commander, Northern Naval Area of the Sri Lanka Navy when he was killed from wounds sustained in a land mine explosion that killed 7 other senior military officers including Lieutenant General Denzil Kobbekaduwa on the island of Kayts while making preparations for Operation Final Countdown, the proposed invasion of the Jaffna Peninsula.

== Early life ==
Born in Colombo, Jayamaha received his education at St. Joseph's College, Colombo, where he excelled as an athlete.

== Naval career ==
He joined the navy as a cadet officer in the Royal Ceylon Navy in July 1969 in the first batch of the Naval and Maritime Academy in Trincomalee. He was promoted to midshipman in July 1970, acting sub lieutenant on 1 January 1972 and followed the Sub Lieutenant Technical Course at INS Venduruthy. He was commissioned as a sub lieutenant on 1 July 1973. In 1974 he was promoted to lieutenant and attended the Navigation & Direction School at INS Venduruthy from 1976 to 1977. In 1982, he was promoted to lieutenant commander and attended the Joint Services Staff College in Canberra. Thereafter he was promoted to commander in 1985 and captain in 1987. In 1988 he was appointed commander of Western Naval Area and went on to serve as director personnel and training and Director of Naval Operations. In 1990 he was promoted to the rank of commodore and was appointed commander, Northern Naval Area on 11 November 1991.

Admiral Jayamaha had been awarded the Rana Wickrama Padakkama, Vishista Seva Vibhushanaya, Uttama Seva Padakkama, Sri Lanka Armed Services Long Service Medal and Clasp, Republic of Sri Lanka Armed Services Medal, Ceylon Armed Services Long Services Medal and Clasp, Purna Bhumi Medal, President’s Inauguration Medal and the Sri Lanka Navy 25th Anniversary Medal.

== Death ==
In July 1992, General Kobbekaduwa was preparing for a new offensive, codenamed "Operation Final Countdown", to recapture the Jaffna peninsula which was under LTTE control. Since the launching pad for the offensive was the island of Kayts on 7 August, General Kobbekaduwa moved to Karainagar naval base by helicopter with his staff. He spent much of the night planning the upcoming offensive with Brigadier Vijaya Wimalaratne, Jaffna Brigade Commander and Commodore Mohan Jayamaha. Due to concerns of the navy about the staging area it was decided to visit the Araly Point the next day.

At 8:00 am the group made up of Maj. General Kobbekaduwa, Brigadier Wimalaratne and Commodore Jayamaha along with several other officers headed out on a naval patrol boat towards Jaffna and returned to Kayts pier. On returning, the party was met by three Land Rovers, the General, the Brigadier and the Commodore got into the Land Rover UHA 8752, with the rest of the army personnel taking vehicle no UHA 8785 and the naval personnel taking UHA 5959, as they set out to Araly Point. Halfway through their journey the General ordered that they all use one vehicle so as not to attract fire form LTTE units in the Jaffna peninsula which was only half a kilometer away. They reached Araly Point and had a discussion and headed back when the Land Rover was hit by an explosion. Major Rupasinghe and Major Induruwa who were 400 yards away from the incident ran to the location to find all but General Kobbekaduwa and Commodore Jayamaha alive. Killed in the explosion was Brigadier Wimalaratne, Lt. Colonels G.H. Ariyaratne, A. Palipahana, H.R. Stephen, all three battalion commanders, Lieutenant Commander Asanga Lankathilaka, Lieutenant Commander C.B Wijepura, Major Nalin S. De Alwis; the General's Aide-de-camp and Corporal Jagath Wickramaratna. The two wounded officers were rushed to the helicopter waiting to transport the group to base, which took them to the military hospital in Palaly where it Commodore Jayamaha was found dead on arrival. General Kobbekaduwa who was conscious was then transferred to the Colombo General Hospital for surgery via helicopter. Where a specialist team of surgeons were unable to save his life.

He was posthumously promoted to rear admiral. At the time of his death he was the third most senior officer in the navy. A memorial service was held for the Admiral at All Saints' Church, Borella presided by the Cardinal Malcolm Ranjith, then Auxiliary Bishop of the Archdiocese of Colombo. Weera Mohan Jayamaha MMV in Dambulla was named after him and a statue of Admiral Jayamaha was erected in Ratmalana.

== Family ==
Admiral Jayamaha was married to Vinodhra, they had a son and a daughter.

== See also ==
- Clancy Fernando
