= B. M. U. D. Basnayake =

Sri Lankan civil servant

B. M. U. D. Basnayake is a Sri Lankan former civil servant. He was the Defence Secretary, prior to which he served as Permanent Secretary to the Ministry of Environment and Renewable Energy.
