= Verité Research =

Sri Lankan-based think tank

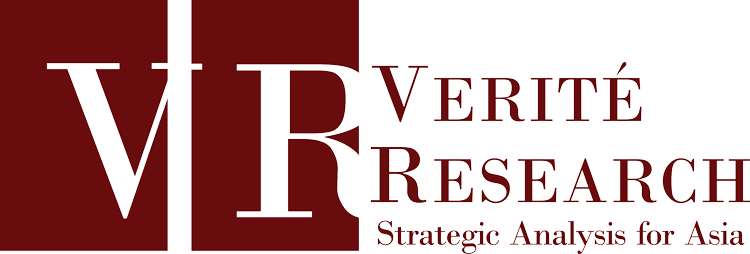
- Founder: Dr. Nishan de Mel
- Established: 2010
- Mission: Verité Research aims to be a leader in the provision of information and analysis for decision making and policy making in Asia, while also promoting dialogue and education for social development in the region.
- Staff: 50+ (2025)
- Key people: Subhashini Abeysignhe Deepanjalie Abeywardena Sankhitha Gunaratne
- Address: 165/1 Park Rd, Colombo 00500, Sri Lanka.
- Location: Colombo, Sri Lanka
- Website: Verité Research

Verité Research is an independent interdisciplinary think tank providing strategic analysis and advice for governments and the private sector in Asia. Its main research divisions are Economics, Politics, Law, Media and Governance and Anti Corruption.

Based in Colombo, Sri Lanka its clients include multinational firms, multilateral agencies, diplomatic missions, government agencies, and civil society actors.

It was founded in 2010 by its Executive Director, Dr. Nishan de Mel, a former senior Sri Lankan policy maker.
