= Rajarata Rifles =

National Service Regiment
- Active: 1954–1956, 1980-1983
- Country: Sri Lanka
- Branch: Sri Lanka Army
- Role: Infantry

The Rajarata Rifles was a former rifle regiment of the Sri Lanka Army. It was one of only three geographically based regiments in the Sri Lanka army. The cap badge of the Raja Rata Rifles shows the figure of a Bherunda Pakshiya (Double-headed eagle).

== First Rajarata Rifles ==
Raised along with Ruhunu Regiment in 1954, by Prime Minister Colonel Sir John Kotelawala with officers and men from the Charley Company of the 2nd(Volunteer) Battalion, Ceylon Light Infantry under the command of Lieutenant Colonel S.D. Ratwatte in Kandy. In 1956, Prime Minister S. W. R. D. Bandaranaike had the Rajarata Rifles and Ruhunu Regiment disbanded fearing personal loyalty of the regiments to Sir John Kotelawala. The Rajarata Rifles were disbanded and its personnel transferred to form the 2nd(Volunteer) Battalion, Ceylon Sinha Regiment under the command of Lieutenant Colonel S.D. Ratwatte in Kandy.

== Second Rajarata Rifles ==
The second regiment called the Rajarata Rifles was formed at Saliyapura in 1980 under its first commanding officer Lieutenant Colonel W. K. Nanayakkara, with Captain Gotabaya Rajapaksa serving as its adjutant. In 1983, following a mutiny the regiment was disbanded with its remaining officers and men amalgamated with the 1st Battalion of the Vijayabahu Infantry Regiment in 1983 to form the Gajaba Regiment.

== Notable members ==
- Colonel A. F. Lafir, PWV, RWP, RSP - Commanding Officer of the 1st Special Forces Regiment
- Lieutenant Colonel Gotabhaya Rajapaksa, RWP, RSP, GR – President of Sri Lanka and former Permanent Secretary to the Ministry of Defence, Public Security, Law & Order
- Major General Kamal Gunaratne - former General Officer Commanding, 53 Division
