= Kokkilai offensive =

Military attack on Sri Lanka during the Sri Lanka Civil War

Kokkilai Offensive
- Part of the Sri Lankan civil war, Eelam War I
Date	13 February 1985
Location	Kokkilai, Sri Lanka
Result	Sri Lanka Army victory

Belligerents
Sri Lanka	Liberation Tigers of Tamil Eelam

Commanders and leaders
Lt. Shantha Wijesinghe	Velupillai Prabhakaran; Ranjan Kanagaratnam †

Units involved
Sri Lanka Armed Forces; Sri Lanka Army	Liberation Tigers of Tamil Eelam

Strength
Unknown	100

Casualties and losses
4 killed	16 killed

The Kokkilai offensive was an attack on the Sri Lanka Army encampment in Kokkilai, Mullaitivu District, Sri Lanka, on the night of 13 February 1985 by the Tamil Tigers. It was the first direct assault on a Sri Lanka military base by a Tamil militant group in the early stages of the Sri Lankan Civil War.

The outpost in the Kokkilai was commanded by Lieutenant Shantha Wijesinghe when it came under attack on the night of 13 February 1985 by a large group of militants. It was the first time the militants made use of RPGs. The garrison held out and received reinforcements by morning. Total 16 bodies of militants were found outside the camp perimeter dressed in military type uniforms and with night vision glasses. Ravi Jayewardene, National Security Adviser of then President of Sri Lanka J.R. Jayewardene reported to the National Security Council that the Kokkilai attack was a full-scale armed confrontation and said the Tamil Tigers were becoming a ‘sophisticated enemy.’ It is believed the Tamil Tiger Ranjan Kanagaratnam died in this attack. Lieutenant Shantha Wijesinghe received a field promotion to captain, the first time in the army’s history.

== See also ==
- List of Sri Lankan Civil War battles
