= Saliyapura Army Camp =

Military base in Sri Lanka

- Anuradhapura, North Central Province

Site information
- Type: Military Base
- Controlled by: Sri Lanka Army

Site history
- In use: 1980–present

Garrison information
- Garrison: Gajaba Regiment

Saliyapura Army Camp is a military base located in close to the ancient city of Anuradhapura, the North Central Province of Sri Lanka. The camp was started out as the regimental headquarters of the Rajarata Rifles from state land. It serves as the regimental headquarters of the Gajaba Regiment of Sri Lanka Army since its formation in 1983. Built in close proximity to SLAF Anuradhapura. The base is the venue for the annual amateur outdoor motocross The Gajaba Supercross organized by the Gajaba Regiment and the SLARDAR, one of the premier motor racing events in the country.
