= Operation Poomalai =

Indian air drop in Sri Lankan Civil War

- Part of Indian intervention in the Sri Lankan Civil War
- Relief supplies drifting towards Jaffna
- Location: Jaffna, Sri Lanka
- Objective: Supply the Tamil Tigers in Jaffna by air; Bring a halt to Operation Liberation
- Date: 4 June 1987; 15:55 – 18:13 (IST)
- Executed by: Indian Air Force; Para SF; 5 Antonov An-32 military transport aircraft; No. 7 Squadron IAF; 4 Mirage 2000H jet fighters
- Outcome: Success: LTTE successfully supplied; Second Phase of Operation Liberation halted the same day

Operation Poomalai (Tamil: Pūmālai, lit. "Flower Garland"), also known as Eagle Mission 4, was the codename assigned to a mission undertaken by the Indian Air Force for airdropping supplies over the besieged city of Jaffna in Sri Lanka on 4 June 1987 to support the Tamil Tigers during the Sri Lankan Civil War.

Jaffna was then under blockade by Sri Lankan troops as a part of Sri Lanka's offensive against the Tamil separatist movement. Concerned over alleged violations of interests of the Tamils, who had broader support among the Tamil population of Tamil Nadu as well as the government, India attempted to negotiate a political settlement but the Indian offers had been rebuffed by Colombo. As civilian casualties grew, calls grew within India to intervene in what was increasingly seen in the Indian (and the Tamil) media as a developing humanitarian crisis, especially with reports of aerial bombardment against rebel positions in civilian areas.

The Government of India, under Rajiv Gandhi, decided to attempt to deliver aid to the northern area of Sri Lanka as a symbolic act of support to the rebels. The first of those efforts, a naval flotilla, was intercepted by the Sri Lanka Navy and was ordered to withdraw. Two days later, India mounted the airdrop over Jaffna.

== Background ==
The ethnic conflict in Sri Lanka can be traced to the independence of the island in 1948 from the British Empire. At the time a Sinhala majority government was instituted that passed legislation deemed discriminatory by the substantial Tamil minority population. In the 1970s two major Tamil parties united to form the Tamil United Liberation Front (TULF) that started agitating for a separate state of Tamil Eelam within the system in a federal structure in northern and eastern Sri Lanka that would grant the Tamils greater autonomy. Outside the TULF, however, factions advocating more radical and militant courses of action soon emerged, and the divisions started flaring into a violent civil war.

The first round of violence flared in 1983 when the Four Four Bravo incident occurred, which sparked anti-Tamil riots in which nearly 3000 Tamil civilians were killed by state-sponsored mobs. The riots only aided in the deterioration of the already worsening ethnic strife. The militant factions, notably the LTTE, at this time recruited in large numbers and continued building on popular Tamil dissent and stepped up the guerrilla activities. In May 1985, the guerrillas launched an attack in Sri Maha Bodhi shrine, a sacred site for Buddhists & it houses the world's oldest living human-planted tree, planted in 288 BC. This was followed by a massacre through the town. At least 150 civilians and monks died in the attack. This event is known as the Anuradhapura massacre. This was also seen as retaliation for the 1985 Valvettiturai massacre which occurred 2 days prior. In this incident, 70 Tamil youths were forced by the Sri Lankan Army to gather within the town's library before it was blown up using high explosives.

The government stepped up its campaign against the insurgency, and the Sri Lankan Army in 1987 laid siege to the city of Jaffna, an LTTE stronghold, as part of its campaign against the Tamil bases known as the Vadamarachchi Operation. India, which had a substantial Tamil population in the southern part of the country, had been aiding the Tamil factions and particularly the LTTE and called on the Sri Lankan government to halt the offensive, which was viewed to be against the sovereign rights of a nation. However, the Indian efforts were futile. Failing to negotiate an end to the crisis with Sri Lanka, India announced on 2 June 1987 that it would send a convoy of ships to northern Sri Lanka to provide humanitarian assistance. A convoy of 19 fishing boats carrying 38 tons of food, fuel, and medicine and an Indian Coast Guard vessel escorting them was sent. On 4 June 1987, the Sri Lanka Navy intercepted and turned back the convoy. Several Sri Lankan patrol boats confronted the convoy as it entered Sri Lankan waters in the Palk Strait and after a four-hour standoff, the Indian convoy turned back.

Following the failure of the naval mission, the decision was made of symbolic support for the Tamil rebels as well as an act to preserve the credibility of Prime Minister of India Rajiv Gandhi among the country's Tamil population—by the Indian Government to carry out an airdrop of the humanitarian supplies to the LTTE, designated Operation Poomalai or Eagle Mission 4.

== Operation ==
Mounted on the evening of 4 June 1987, the operation involved five An-32s of the Paratroop Training School in Agra, escorted by five Mirage 2000Hs of the No. 7 Squadron. At 2200 on 2 June, 7 Squadron was directed to send a six aircraft detachment to HAL Airport, where they were re-directed to Yelahanka Air Force Station north of the city. At the same time, under the supervision of the (then) Vice-Chief of Air Staff Air Marshal S. Raghavendran, five An-32s were loaded with the relief supplies and took off for Bangalore at 0800. These were to fly out—led by Gp. Capt. B.K. Sunder, CO of Paratroop Training School—after dawn and carry out the supply drop under the cover of the Mirages, which were led by Wg. Cdr. Ajit Bhavnani, CO of No. 7 Squadron. A group of 35 national and international journalists also joined the flight. The Mirages were armed with two Matra Magic II AAMs and their twin-30 mm DEFA 554 revolver cannons were loaded with 125 rounds each as a measure against any opposition by the Sri Lanka Air Force, and also carried three drop tanks.

An-32s of the Indian Air Force taxiing for take-off from Bangalore during Operation Poomalai.

Sri Lankan High Commissioner to New Delhi Bernard Tilakaratna was summoned to the Ministry of External Affairs at 15:00, where the message was conveyed by Minister of External Affairs Natwar Singh that the Indian Air Force would be flying a mission at 16:00 to drop supplies over Jaffna. He was told that the aircraft were expected to complete their mission unhindered and any opposition by the Sri Lankan Air Force "would be met by force" by the escorting Mirage 2000s.

The first of the flights left Bangalore at 15:55 and flew towards the Coromandel Coast, where they were met by four Mirage escorts. One Mirage stayed back acting as radio relay, along with two additional An-32s over Tamil Nadu, which acted as radio relay to Bangalore. The An-32s carried almost 25 tons of relief supplies, consisting of rice, milk powder, vegetables, and kerosene.

The flight leader attempted radio contact with Colombo ATC over the civilian air traffic radio channel at 16:47, but was unable to establish contact. The mission approached Jaffna peninsula at about 16:50 and sighted Jaffna Town itself at 17:00. The aircraft descended from 12000 feet to about 1500 feet and carried out the drop at the drop zone about 7 km from the town of Jaffna. The aircraft then turned in a western direction, flying over Palay Air Base before turning north and heading for the Indian coast.

The mission arrived back to over Bangalore at 18:13.

== Aftermath ==
In the wake of Operation Poomalai, Sri Lanka accused India of violating its sovereignty. However, India defended its actions as a mercy mission in aid of what were termed as the deteriorating conditions of the civilian population, refusing at the time to rule out further missions. Within India, the actions were endorsed across the political diaspora In India, it was seen at the time as an act of support against the beleaguered and besieged Tamil population of the north – an opinion that was destined to undergo a drastic reversal after the assassination of Rajiv Gandhi by the LTTE in 1991. At that time, Colombo deemed it as a blatant show of support for the Tamil Tigers. The total supply air dropped by India during the operation amounted to little over 25 tons, and this was clearly not sufficient to sustain a besieged city.

== See also ==
- IPKF
- Raid on Jaffna University
