= Office of the Chief of the Defence Staff (Sri Lanka) =

Operational-level headquarters of the Sri Lanka's Chief of the Defence Staff

Office of the Chief of Defence Staff
- OCDS
- Role: Operational coordination of the Military of Sri Lanka
- Established: 15 July 2009
- Abolished: 31 December 2024
- Constituting instrument: Chief of Defence Staff Act, No. 35 of 2009
- Preceded by: Joint Operations Headquarters (2000–2009); Joint Operations Bureau (1999–2000); Joint Operations Command (1985-1999)
- Parent agency: Ministry of Defence
- Seat: BMICH

The Office of the Chief of Defence Staff (OCDS) was the Sri Lanka Armed Forces operational level headquarters of the Chief of the Defence Staff (CDS), which was responsible for coordinating joint armed force's operations. However the respective service commands had much autonomy for their deployments.

It was previously known as the Joint Operations Headquarters (JOH). The JOH was created in 1999 replacing the civilian Joint Operations Bureau which had existed briefly in 1999. The origins of the JOH could be traced back to the Joint Operations Command (JOC) established in 1985 due to the need of co-ordination of operations among the tri-services and the police with the escalation of the Sri Lankan Civil War. The head of the JOC is the Chief of the Defence Staff (CDS), currently. The duties of the CDS was extended by the Chief of Defence Staff Act No. 35 of 2009. JOH is located in Colombo.

== See also ==
- Chief of the Defence Staff
