= List of tallest structures in Sri Lanka =

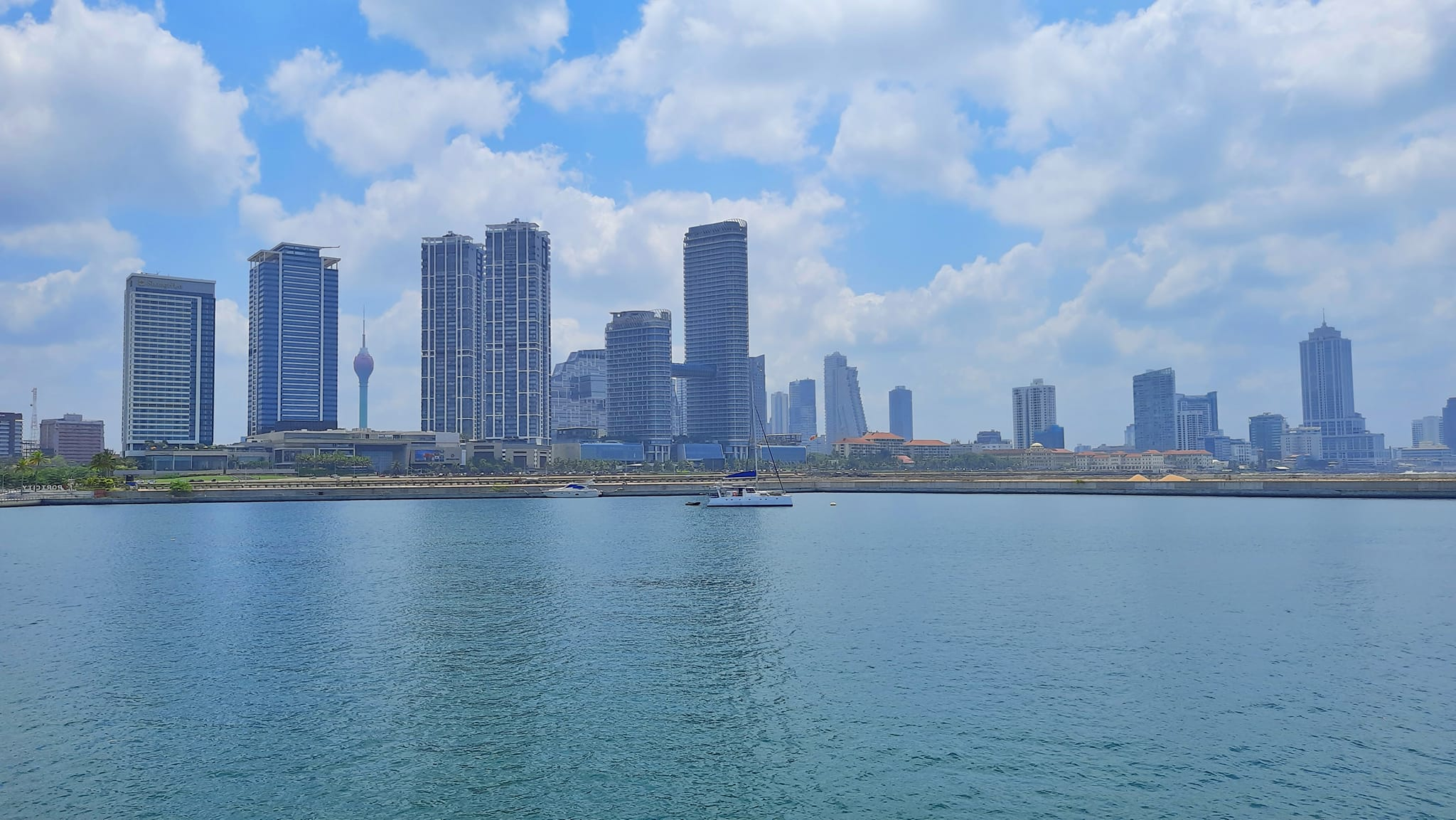
Colombo Skyline

The following page lists the tallest buildings and structures in Sri Lanka in terms of the highest architectural detail. Apart from the historical timeline of tallest structures, structures which are shorter than 20-floors (for habitable buildings) or 100 m (328 ft) (for non-habitable structures) are excluded. Whereas structures that are under construction but have topped out are included in this list.

The majority of high-rise structures in the country are located in the commercial capital Colombo. As of May 2017, the tallest structure on the island is the Lotus Tower at 350 m (1,150 ft), and the tallest habitable building is the Altair at 240 m (790 ft).

== Tallest structures ==
This list ranks the structures in Sri Lanka that stand at least 100 m (330 ft) or 20 floors. Only completed buildings and structures are included.

Rank	Name	Image	Height (m)	Height (ft)	Floors	Year	Use	Location	Co-ordinates	Ref
1	Lotus Tower		350	1,148	13	2019	Communication & Commercial	Colombo	06°55′37″N 79°51′30″E	
2	606 The Address: Residential Tower		262	860	63	2024	Residential	Colombo	06°53′58″N 79°51′11″E	
3	Altair Straight Tower		240	787	68	2018	Residential	Colombo	06°55′08″N 79°51′16″E	
4	Grand Hyatt		229	751	47	2017	Commercial	Colombo	06°54′57″N 79°50′52″E	
5	ITC Colombo One: Residential Tower		225	738	55	2024	Residential	Colombo	06°55′29″N 79°50′44″E	
6	Mireka Tower at Havelock City		210	689	50	2022	Commercial	Colombo	06°52′57″N 79°52′04″E	
7	Altair Sloping Tower		209	686	63	2018	Residential	Colombo	06°55′08″N 79°51′16″E	
8=	Tri-Zen: Tower 1		195	640	53	2023	Residential	Colombo		
8=	Tri-Zen: Tower 2		195	640	52	2023	Residential	Colombo		
8=	Tri-Zen: Tower 3		195	640	51	2023	Residential	Colombo		
11=	One Galle Face: Residential Tower 1		194	636	51	2018	Residential	Colombo	06°55′36″N 79°50′42″E	
11=	One Galle Face: Residential Tower 2		194	636	51	2018	Residential	Colombo	06°55′37″N 79°50′44″E	
13	Clearpoint Residencies		185	607	48	2017	Residential	Kotte	06°54′41″N 79°54′18″E	
14	Colombo City Centre		183	600	47	2018	Commercial & Residential	Colombo	06°55′03″N 79°51′19″E	
15=	Capital TwinPeaks: Tower 1		182	597	50	2020	Residential	Colombo	06°55′11″N 79°51′16″E	
15=	Capitol TwinPeaks: Tower 2		182	597	50	2020	Residential	Colombo	06°55′11″N 79°51′15″E	
15=	Pearl Grand Towers		178	582	40	2020	Commercial	Colombo	06°53′44″N 79°51′18″E	
16	Kokavil Tower		174	571	n/a	2011	Communication	Kokavil	09°16′10″N 80°24′29″E	
17	447 Luna Tower		170	558	44	2019	Residential	Colombo	06°55′08″N 79°51′44″E	
18	One Galle Face Office Tower		165	541	35	2018	Commercial	Colombo	06°55′40″N 79°50′41″E	
19	Cinnamon Life Colombo Residential Tower		153	502	45	2019	Residential	Colombo	06°55′35″N 79°50′54″E	
20=	World Trade Center East Tower		152	499	43	1996	Commercial	Colombo	06°55′58″N 79°50′37″E	
20=	World Trade Center West Tower		152	499	43	1996	Commercial	Colombo	06°55′58″N 79°50′39″E	
22=	Lakvijaya Power Station: Chimney 1		150	492	n/a	2010	Industrial	Norocholai	08°01′06″N 79°43′18″E	
22=	Lakvijaya Power Station: Chimney 2		150	492	n/a	2010	Industrial	Norocholai	08°01′03″N 79°43′19″E	
22=	Lakvijaya Power Station: Chimney 3		150	492	n/a	2010	Industrial	Norocholai	08°01′00″N 79°43′20″E	
25=	OnThree20: Tower 1		146	479	38	2014	Residential	Colombo	06°55′10″N 79°51′33″E	
25=	OnThree20: Tower 2		146	479	38	2014	Residential	Colombo	06°55′10″N 79°51′34″E}	
25=	OnThree20: Tower 3		146	479	38	2014	Residential	Colombo	06°55′08″N 79°51′33″E	
25=	Astoria: Tower 1		146	479	42	2017	Residential	Colombo	06°54′21″N 79°51′11″E	
25=	Astoria: Tower 2		146	479	41	2017	Residential	Colombo	06°54′21″N 79°51′09″E	
29	Empire: North Tower		142	466	37	2009	Residential	Colombo	06°55′08″N 79°51′30″E	
30	ITC Rathnadipa Colombo: Hotel		140	459	33	2024	Commercial	Colombo	06°55′32″N 79°50′43″E	
31	Shangri-La Colombo		134	440	32	2017	Commercial	Colombo	06°55′43″N 79°50′40″E	
32=	Empire: South Tower		132	433	35	2009	Residential	Colombo	06°55′07″N 79°51′30″E	
32=	The Emperor		132	433	35	2011	Residential	Colombo	06°55′07″N 79°50′52″E	
34	Hilton Colombo Residences		129	423	34	1997	Commercial & Residential	Colombo	06°55′14″N 79°51′22″E	
35	Maga One		127	417	33	2017	Commercial	Colombo	06°53′12″N 79°53′01″E	
36	Jetavanaramaya		122	400	n/a	273–301	Religious	Anuradhapura	08°21′06″N 80°24′13″E	
37=	Fairway SkyGardens					2014	Residential	Colombo	06°54′51″N 79°54′19″E	
37=	Havelock City Park Tower		115	377	22	2010	Residential	Colombo	06°52′58″N 79°52′00″E	
37=	Havelock City Elibank Tower		115	377	22	2010	Residential	Colombo	06°52′57″N 79°51′58″E	
37=	Crescat Residencies		113	371	25	1997	Commercial & Residential	Colombo	06°55′04″N 79°50′52″E	
37=	The Monarch		113	371	30	2007	Residential	Colombo	06°55′02″N 79°50′54″E	
37=	Fairmount Urban Oasis				31	2010	Residential	Colombo	06°54′53″N 79°54′17″E	
43=	Iceland Residencies: Tower 1		110	361	31	2008	Residential	Colombo	06°55′12″N 79°50′53″E	
43=	Iceland Residencies: Tower 2		110	361	31	2008	Residential	Colombo	06°55′12″N 79°50′54″E	
45=	Bank of Ceylon: Headquarters		105	344	32	1985	Commercial	Colombo	06°55′57″N 79°50′34″E	
45=	Cinnamon Red Colombo		105	344	26	2013	Commercial	Colombo	06°54′44″N 79°51′19″E	
47	Ruwanwelisaya		103	338	n/a	140BC	Religious	Anuradhapura	08°21′0″N 80°23′47″E	
48	Bank of Ceylon: Merchant Tower		100	328	30		Commercial	Colombo	06°54′45″N 79°51′03″E	
49=	Royal Park: North Tower		91	300	25		Residential	Colombo	06°54′22″N 79°53′17″E	
49=	Royal Park: South Tower		91	300	25		Residential	Colombo	06°54′20″N 79°53′17″E	
51	Ocean View Tower		90	295	22	1980	Residential	Colombo	06°53′33″N 79°51′13″E	
52	HNB Tower		85	279	23	2002	Commercial	Colombo	06°55′15″N 79°51′45″E	
53	Hilton Colombo		81	266	21	1987	Commercial	Colombo	06°55′57″N 79°50′41″E	
54	Parkland Building		78	256	22	2016	Commercial	Colombo	06°55′02″N 79°51′32″E	
55	Fairway Residencies		69	226	20		Residential	Colombo	06°54′32″N 79°54′19″E	
56	Access Tower II		30			2018	Commercial	Colombo		
57	Orwell Residency				26	2017	Residential	Colombo	06°54′23″N 79°51′09″E	
58	Iconic 110				25	2014	Residential	Colombo	06°54′26″N 79°53′26″E	
59	Mövenpick Hotel Colombo				24	2017	Commercial	Colombo		
60	Havelock City: Layards Tower				22	2014	Residential	Colombo	06°52′56″N 79°51′56″E	
61	Havelock City: Davidson Tower				22	2014	Residential	Colombo	06°52′55″N 79°51′54″E	
62	Platinum 1				20	2014	Commercial & Residential	Colombo	06°54′03″N 79°51′12″E	
63	Astoria: Tower 3						Residential	Colombo	06°54′19″N 79°51′12″E	
64	Astoria: Tower 4						Residential	Colombo	06°54′19″N 79°51′11″E	
65	The Elements						Residential	Colombo		

== Tallest structure by category ==
The following table is a list of the tallest completed or topped out structures in each of the categories below. There can only be one structure in each category unless the title for the tallest is a draw.

Category	Structure	Image	Location	Height (metres)	Height (feet)	Year	Co-ordinates	Notes	Ref.
Self-supporting structure	Lotus Tower		Colombo	350	1148	2019	06°55′37″N 79°51′30″E		
Office	World Trade Center		Colombo	152	449	1996	06°55′58″N 79°50′39″E		
Hotel	Grand Hyatt Colombo		Colombo	229	751	2017	06°54′57″N 79°50′52″E	Completed in 2017 but pending opening. Tallest open hotel is 134-meter Shangri-La Colombo.	
Residential	Altair		Colombo	240	787	2018	06°55′08″N 79°51′16″E	Topped out in December 2017.	
Twin Towers	One Galle Face		Colombo	194	636	2018	06°55′36″N 79°50′42″E	Topped out in 2018.	
Lattice tower	Kokavil Tower		Kokavil	174	571	2011			
Stupa	Ruwanwelisaya		Anuradhapura	103	338	1940	08°21′0″N 80°23′47″E	Renovated to 103m in 1940 from the ruins of original 55-metre stupa built in 140 BC. Jetavanaramaya was 400 feet when built but current height is only 232 feet.	
Lighthouse	Dondra Head Lighthouse		Dondra	47	154	1889			
Dam	Victoria		Teldeniya	122	400	1985			
Monument	Dawson Tower		Kadugannawa			1832			
Wind turbine	Mampuri Wind Farms		Kalpitiya	90	295	2015			

== Structures under construction ==
This list ranks buildings and structures that are under construction in Sri Lanka and are planned to rise at least 100 m (330 ft) or 20 floors tall. Colombo has the most under-construction buildings and structures followed by Kotte.

Name	Image	Height (m)	Height (ft)	Floors	Completion	Use	Location	Co-ordinates	Ref
The One Tower		376	1,234	92	2027	Commercial & Residential	Colombo	06°56′01″N 79°51′30″E	
The One: JW Marriott		303	994	76	2026	Commercial	Colombo	06°55′59″N 79°50′45″E	
606 The Address: Hotel Tower		142		30		Commercial	Colombo		
Orion City 1		110	361	22	2017		Colombo	06°56′26″N 79°52′44″E	
The Destiny II				50		Residential	Colombo	06°55′21″N 79°50′58″E	
The Destiny I: Tower 1				44		Residential	Colombo	06°55′23″N 79°50′57″E	
The Destiny I: Tower 2				44		Residential	Colombo	06°55′24″N 79°50′57″E	
InterContinental Hotel Colombo				42	2019	Commercial	Colombo		
Capital Heights				40		Residential	Kotte		
Cinnamon Life: Suites Tower				39	2019	Residential	Colombo	06°55′26″N 79°50′55″E	
Sky One				37		Residential	Colombo		
Prime Grand				36		Residential	Colombo		
One Galle Face: Office				35		Commercial	Colombo	06°55′40″N 79°50′42″E	
Mehewara Piyasa: Labour Department				34		Government	Colombo		
Iconic Galaxy				33		Residential	Kotte		
Bellevue Residencies				33		Residential	Ja-Ela		
Cinnamon Life: Hotel Tower				30	2019	Commercial	Colombo		
Cinnamon Life: Office Tower				30	2019	Commercial	Colombo	06°55′29″N 79°50′56″E	
Baseline Residencies				29		Residential	Colombo	06°52′58″N 79°52′35″E	
Park Heights				29		Residential	Colombo	06°53′12″N 79°52′16″E	
Havelock City: Melford Tower				28	2017	Residential	Colombo	06°52′51″N 79°51′55″E	
Hvelock City: Stratford Tower				28	2017	Residential	Colombo	06°52′53″N 79°51′55″E	
Marine Drive Hotel				27		Commercial	Colombo		
Sethsiripaya Administrative Complex Stage 3				26		Government	Kotte		
Amari Hotel Colombo				24	2019	Commercial	Colombo		
Amrith				24		Residential	Colombo		
Borella Puplic Sector Employees Building Complex				23	2019	Government	Colombo		
Fairway Latitude				22	2021	Residential	Colombo		
Sheraton Hotel				21		Commercial	Colombo	06°54′37″N 79°51′01″E	
Tata Housing: Tower 1				21		Residential	Colombo		
Tata Housing: Tower 2				21		Residential	Colombo		
Tata Housing: Tower 3				21		Residential	Colombo		
Colombo District Secretariat				20		Government	Colombo		

== On hold ==
This table lists buildings that were at one time under construction in Sri Lanka and were expected to rise at least 100 metres (330 ft) or 20 floors in height, but are now on hold. While not officially cancelled, construction has been suspended on each development.

Name	Image	Height (m)	Height (ft)	Floors	Completion	Use	Location	Co-ordinates	Notes	Ref
World Capital Centre		625	2,051	110		Commercial & Residential	Colombo			
The One: Ritz Carlton Hotel and Residences		326	1,070	84	2024	Commercial & Residential	Colombo	06°56′01″N 79°50′42″E		
Achilleion: Tower 1		182	597	50	-	Residential	Colombo	06°53′34″N 79°51′15″E		
Achilleion: Tower 2		182	597	50	-	Residential	Colombo	06°53′34″N 79°51′14″E		
Dawson Grand: Tower A		140	459	42	-	Residential	Colombo	06°55′10″N 79°51′28″E	Completed Tower A up to level 3	
Dawson Grand: Tower B		140	459	42	-	Residential	Colombo	06°55′08″N 79°51′28″E	Completed Tower B up to ground level	

== Proposed/Vision ==
This list ranks buildings and structures that are approved or proposed and are planned to rise at least 100 m (330 ft) or 20 floors tall.

Name	Image	Height (m)	Height (ft)	Floors	Completion	Use	Location	Co-ordinates	Ref
World Capital Centre		625	2,051	110		Commercial & Residential	Colombo		
Altitude		363	1,191	96		Commercial & Residential	Sri Jayawardenepura Kotte	06°54′34″N 79°54′09″E	
World Export Centre: Tower 1				55		Commercial	Colombo		
World Export Centre: Tower 2				55		Commercial	Colombo		
EON Resorts				45		Commercial	Colombo	06°55′52″N 79°51′19″E	
Marina Square: Tower 1				36		Residential	Colombo		
Marina Square: Tower 2				36		Residential	Colombo		
Marina Square: Tower 3				36		Residential	Colombo		
Marina Square: Tower 4				36		Residential	Colombo		
Marina Square: Tower 5				36		Residential	Colombo		
Havelock Heights				32		Residential	Colombo		
Renuka Tower				32		Commercial	Colombo		
Solitaire				26		Residential	Colombo		
Uptown Residences: Tower 1				25		Residential	Colombo		
Uptown Residences: Tower 2				25		Residential	Colombo		
Orion City 2						Commercial	Colombo		

== Timeline of tallest structures ==
Name	Image	Height (m)	Height (ft)	Floors	Year as tallest	Location	Co-ordinates	Notes
Ruwanwelisaya (Original)		55	180	n/a	140 BC - 305 AD (445 years)	Anuradhapura	08°21′0″N 80°23′47″E	Original stupa was 55m. Renovated to 103m in 1940.
Jetavanaramaya		122	400	n/a	305–1000 (700+ years)	Anuradhapura	08°21′06″N 80°24′13″E	Abandon and jungle covered stupa by 11th century. Rebuilt to current height of 71 m (232 ft) in 12th century.
Ruwanwelisaya (Renovated)		103	338	n/a	1940-1985 (45 years)	Anuradhapura	08°21′0″N 80°23′47″E	Renovated to 103m in 1940 from the ruins of original 55-metre stupa.
Victoria Dam		122	400	n/a	1985-1996 (11 years)	Teldeniya		
World Trade Center		152	499	43	1996–2011 (15 years)	Colombo	06°55′58″N 79°50′37″E	
Kokavil Tower		174	571	n/a	2011–2017 (6 years)	Kokavil	09°16′10″N 80°24′29″E	
Grand Hyatt Colombo		229	751	47	2017-2018 (1 year)	Colombo	06°54′57″N 79°50′52″E	
Lotus Tower		350	1,148	13	2018–present	Colombo	06°55′37″N 79°51′30″E	Topped out in 2018. Completion expected 2018/19.

== Timeline of tallest buildings ==
Name	Image	Height (m)	Height (ft)	Floors	Year as tallest	Location	Co-ordinates	Notes	Ref
Lovamahapaya		47	154	9	155 BC - 900+ AD (1000+ years)	Anuradhapura	08°20′46″N 80°23′52″E	Fire destroyed original (137-119 BC). Rebuilt several time to 7 & 5-floor heights.	
Ceylinco House		55	180	15	1960–1980 (20 years)	Colombo		Tallest building in South Asia (1960-1961)	
Ocean View Tower (Bambalapitiya Tower)		90	295	22	1980–1985 (5 years)	Colombo	06°53′33″N 79°51′13″E		
Bank of Ceylon Headquarters		105	344	32	1985–1996 (11 years)	Colombo	06°55′57″N 79°50′34″E		
World Trade Center		152	499	43	1996–2017 (21 years)	Colombo	06°55′58″N 79°50′37″E		
Grand Hyatt Colombo		229	751	47	2017–2018	Colombo	06°54′57″N 79°50′52″E	Surpassed WTC in December 2013. Topped out 2017. Completion pending.	
Altair		240	787	68	2018	Colombo	06°55′08″N 79°51′16″E	Completed in 2021	
606 The Address: Hotel Tower		262	859	68	2022	Colombo		Topped out August 2022	

== See also ==
- List of tallest buildings and structures in South Asia
- List of tallest buildings in Asia
- List of tallest buildings in the world
