= Battle of Kokavil =

LTTE attack on Sri Lankan Military camp at Kokavil

- Part of the Sri Lankan Civil War
Date	27 June - 11 July 1990
Location	Kokavil, Sri Lanka
Result	Tamil Tiger victory

Belligerents
Sri Lanka	Liberation Tigers of Tamil Eelam

Commanders and leaders
Lieutenant Saliya Aladeniya †	Unknown

Units involved
Sri Lanka Armed Forces: Sri Lanka Army	Unknown

Strength
54	Unknown

Casualties and losses
48 killed, 18 wounded	Unknown

The Battle of Kokavil (Sinhala: කොකාවිල් සටන) was fought from 27 June to 11 July 1990 in Kokavil, Sri Lanka. The Sri Lankan military camp at Kokavil was put to siege by the Liberation Tigers of Tamil Eelam (LTTE) for 14 days before they captured it. Of the 54 Sri Lankan Army soldiers stationed in the base at the time, only 2 and a civilian cook reached friendly lines after the battle, with all others having been presumably killed by the LTTE.

== Background ==
Following the resumption of hostilities after the withdrawal of the Indian Peace Keeping Force, the Eelam War II of the Sri Lankan Civil War started in June 1990. In early June 1990, LTTE militants attacked SLA forces in the area of Mankulam. These initial attacks were repulsed but by June 12, both Mankulam and Kokavil were surrounded. On the 11 June 1990, the Sri Lankan government ordered over 600 police officers to surrender to the LTTE after their police stations were surrounded, who were then massacred.

The Army has established an encampment in Kokavil to protect the Rupavahini Relay Station and facilities located there. The A Company, 3rd (Volunteer) Battalion of the Sri Lanka Sinha Regiment was deployed in Mankulam and Kokavil. It had assigned 54 men to Kokavil while the remaining army personnel at Kokavil came from the 2nd (Volunteer) Battalion, Vijayabahu Infantry Regiment; Sri Lanka Signals Corps; Sri Lanka Army Service Corps; and the Sri Lanka Army Medical Corps. With the detachment at Kokavil under the command of Lieutenant Saliya Aladeniya. On June 16 a ceasefire was declared so negotiations can take place. Shortly after this sixteen soldiers and an officer, from the detachment left on leave leaving one officer and 53 soldiers at the camp who were reservists from a volunteer battalion.

== Battle ==
On June 27, the LTTE surrounded the camp for 14 days and began staging attacks on the camp constantly. Medicine, food and water for SLA forces were in short supply. Supplies had to be dropped by helicopters, however, because of heavy LTTE fire, the supplies had to be dropped from high above the camp, causing much of it to land off course outside the perimeter of the camp where it was lost.

The final attack began on July 10, when the LTTE started building up forces around the camp. Reinforcements and resupply for the soldiers at the camp were not able to arrive because all routes were blocked by LTTE forces. The SLA soldiers in the camp were left with only 300 rounds of ammunition, and only some 30 soldiers were still alive, half of whom were seriously wounded. The officer commanding the SLA detachment, Lieutenant Aladeniya, was given the order to evacuate, but refused because he did not want to leave his wounded. At 11:45 p.m., on 11 July, the LTTE finally overran the camp. Final words spoken by Lt. Aladeniya to Wanni headquarters were,

Don’t worry sir, I will fight till I die.

== Aftermath ==
Captain Saliya Aladeniya was posthumously awarded the Parama Weera Vibhushanaya on 21 June 1994.

52 SLA officers and soldiers were declared missing in action by the Sri Lankan Army as the SLA could not reach the location to verify their fate. Defense ministry official indicate 48 killed and 18 wounded. The LTTE destroyed the relay station and tower. Lieutenant Saliya Aladeniya was posthumously promoted to rank of captain and honoured with the Parama Weera Vibhushanaya for bravery on 21 June 1994. Corporal Siriwardena of the 3(V)SLSR and Corporal Nimal Siriwardena of the 2(V)VIR had escaped the camp and reported to the Mankulam army camp, as well as a civilian mess waiter named Dayananda, who managed to escape just as the camp was overrun, reportedly seeing nine wounded soldiers being thrown into the burning buildings by the LTTE after the LTTE set alight to the buildings after overrunning the camp.

Kokavil was recaptured by troops from the 57 Division in October 2008 during the Battle of Kilinochchi (2008–2009). The Kokavil transmission tower was rebuilt along with a memorial for the 52 soldiers of the Sri Lanka Sinha Regiment who were lost in the battle.

== See also ==
- List of Sri Lankan Civil War battles
- 1990 Batticaloa massacre
