= Architecture of Sri Lanka =

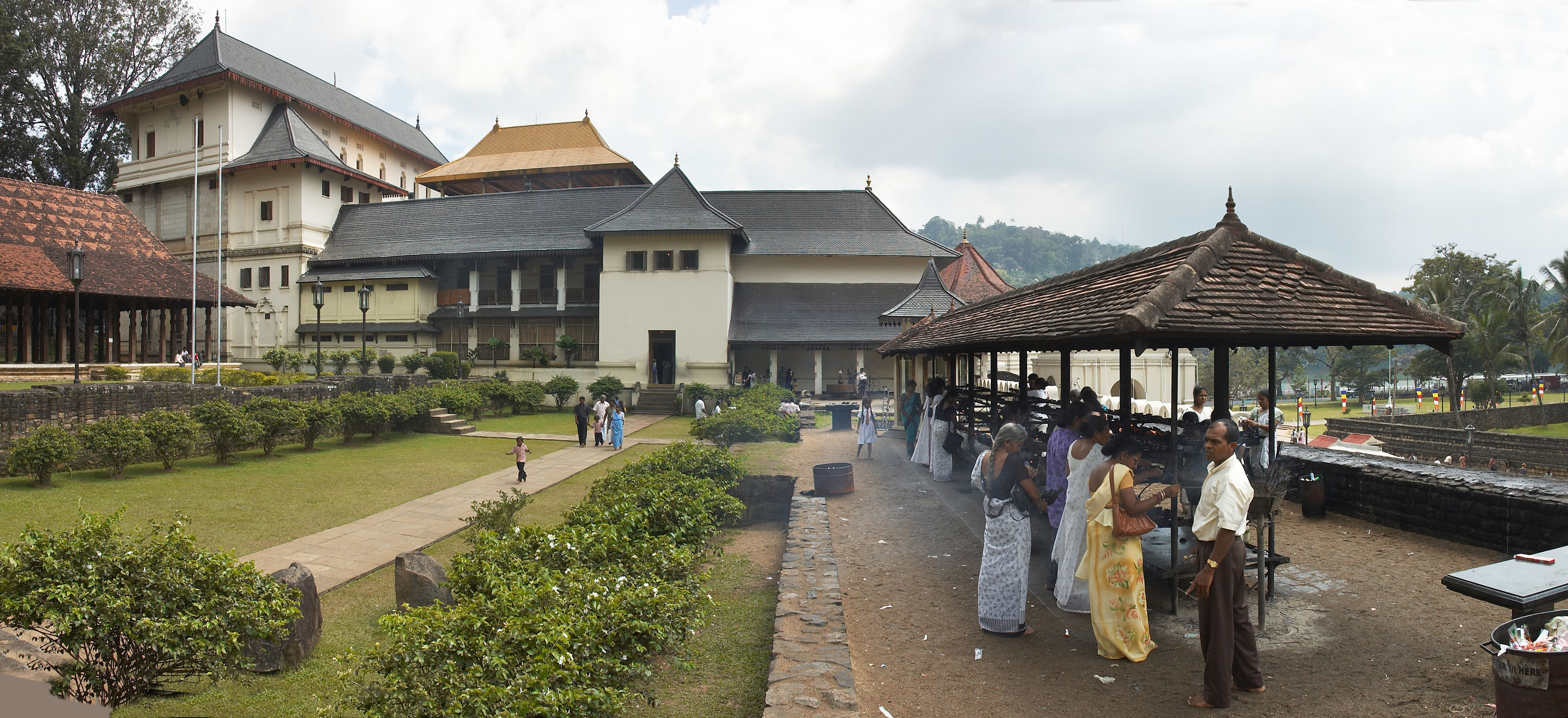
The Temple of the Tooth in Kandy, Sri Lanka, is an example of traditional Sri Lankan architecture

The architecture of Sri Lanka displays a rich variety of architectural forms and styles. Buddhism has had a significant influence on Sri Lankan architecture, since it was introduced to the island in the 3rd century BCE.

Traditionally, Chinese and Indian architecture have been the most significant forms of foreign influence on Sri Lankan architecture and both have played a prominent role in shaping it. Architectural influences from Southeast Asia have also influenced the development of Sri Lankan architecture and vice versa. Techniques and styles developed in Europe, transported to the country via colonialism, also played a major role in the architecture of Sri Lanka later on. Many buildings survive from the Dutch and British period of occupation.

== Ancient architecture ==
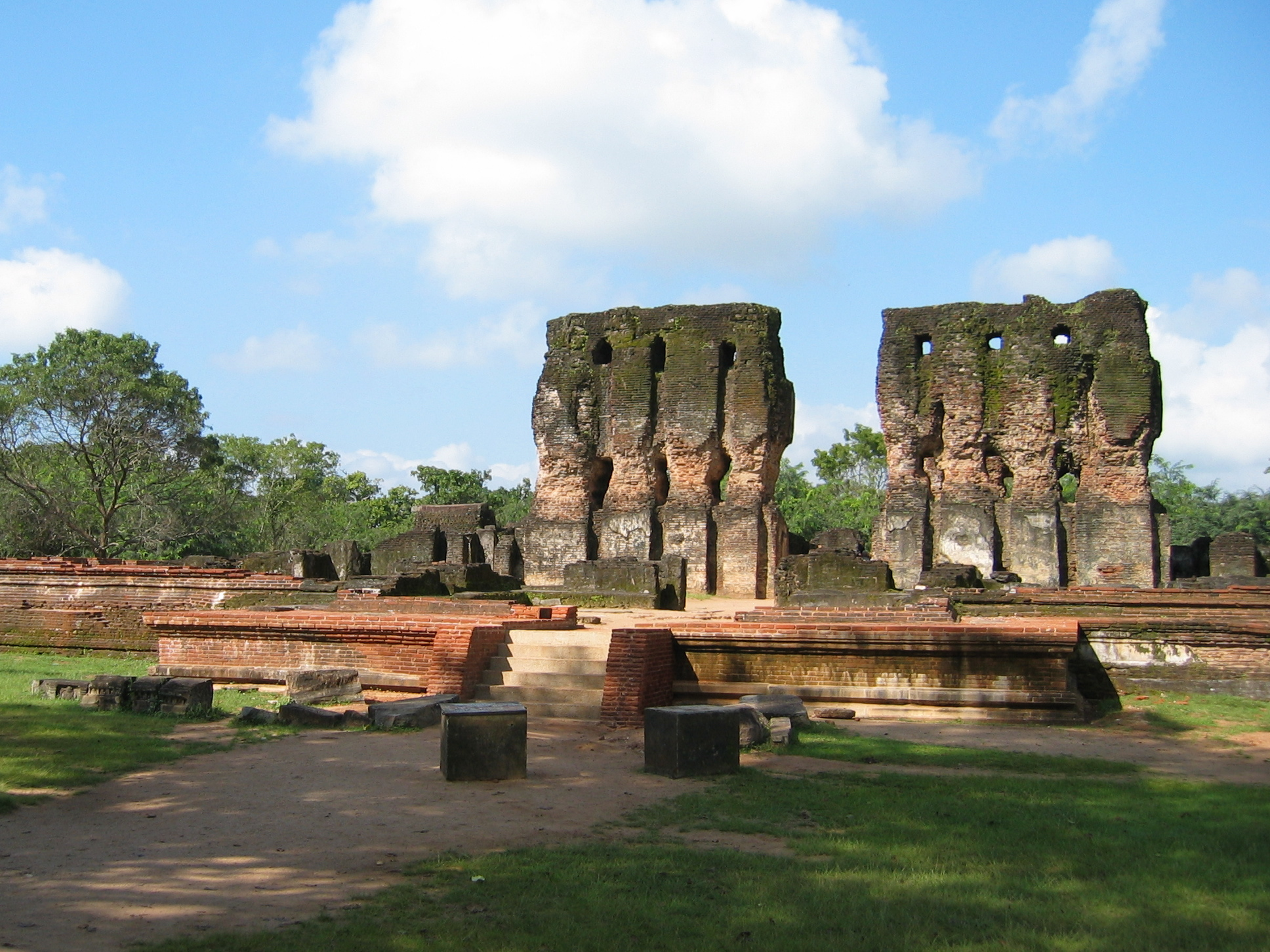
A Royal Palace in Polonnaruwa

=== Cave temples ===
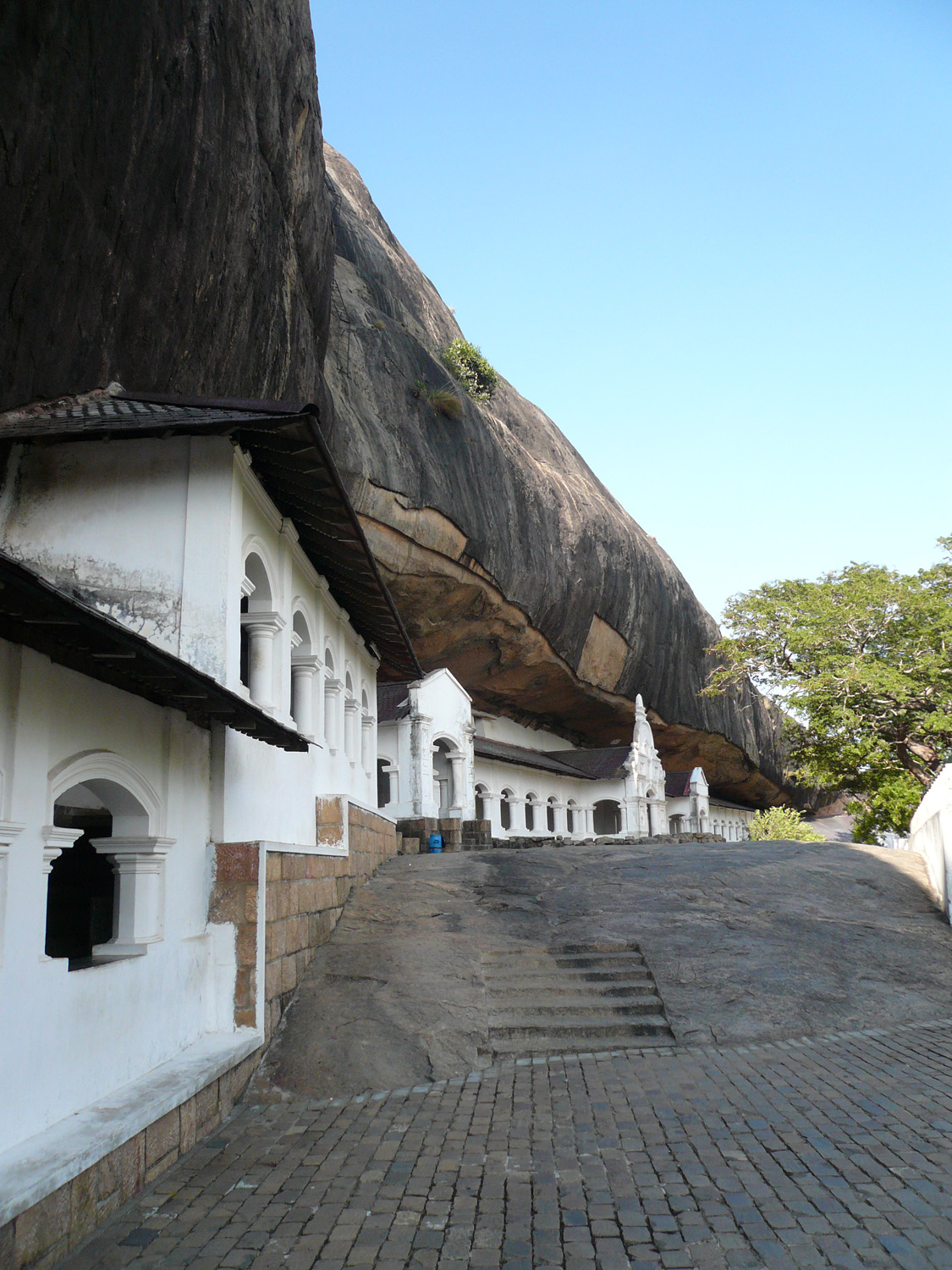

The earliest evidence of cave temples is found in the temple complexes of Mihintale. A unique feature in these caves was the use of a drip ledge carved along the top edge of the rock ceiling which stopped rainwater running into the cave. With time, doors, windows and walls of brick or stone were added. The roof and walls were plastered white and finished with decorative paintings, these are evident in the cave temples of Dambulla. Chipped material of the rock packed underneath the clay-finished floor.

Cave complexes of Dambulla and Situlpahuwa contained 80 caves each, The Kaludiya Pokuna, Mihintale cave temple is constructed with brick walls, granite window openings, and ceilings. The Gal vihara, Polonnaruwa and the cave temples of Dambulla were initially constructed as cave temples, later on, the cave temples were converted to image houses.

=== Dagobas or Stupas ===
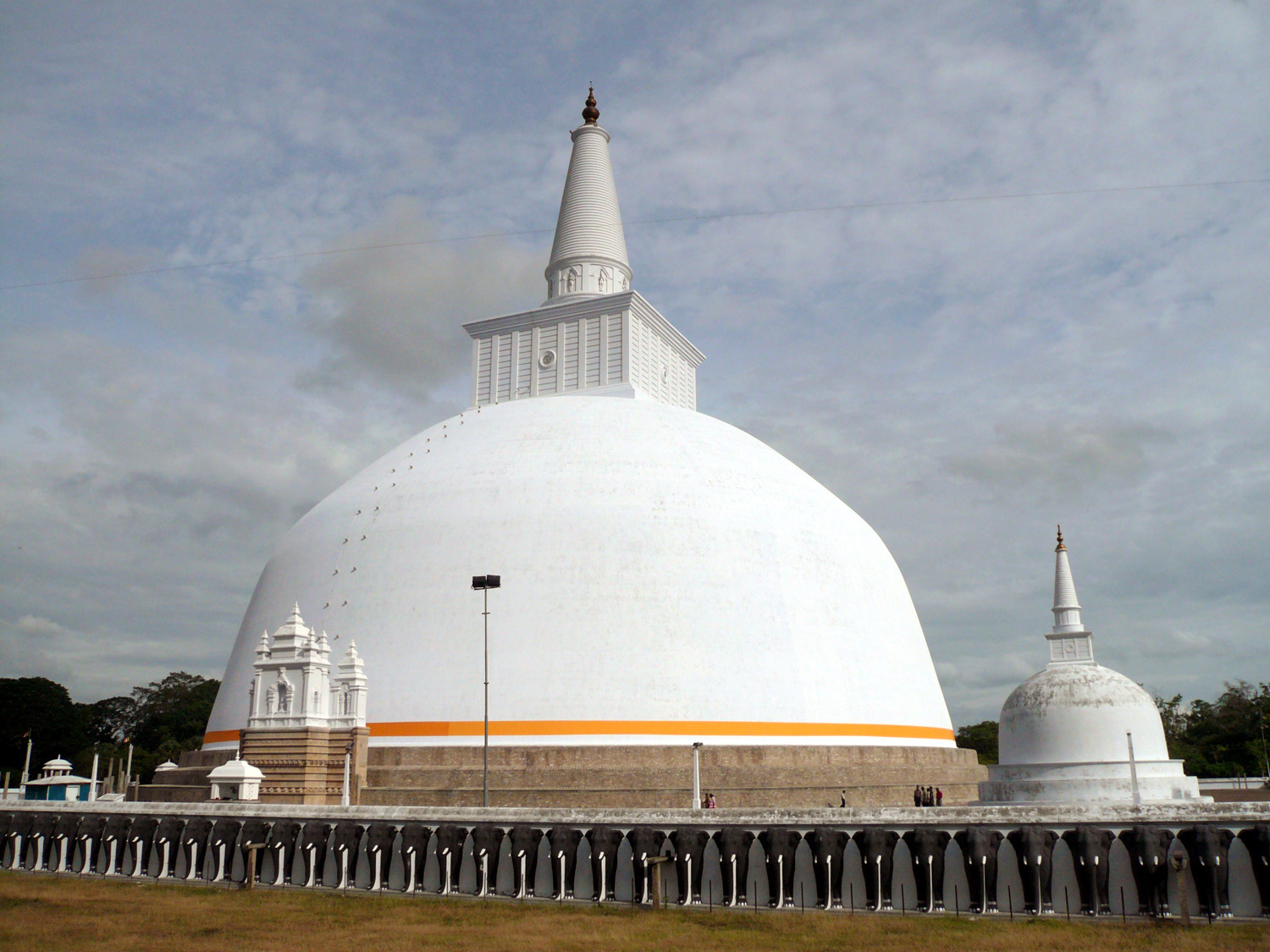
The Ruwanweli Saya Stupa in Anuradhapura

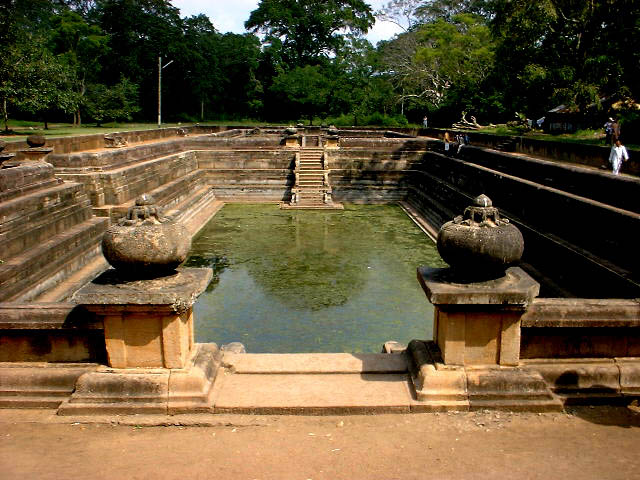
The Kuttam Pokuna in Anuradhapura

The dagobas or stupas are distinctive for many reasons. They are probably the largest brick structures known to the pre-modern world. Demala Maha Seya, which was never completed, had a circumference of 2,011 feet (613 m). Jetavanaramaya is the largest stupa constructed in any part of the world. It is over 120 metres in height and has a diameter of 367 feet (112 m). The foundations are 28 feet (9 m) deep. It needed bricks that could bear the load of 368 pounds. Jetavanarama was the third tallest building in the ancient world. Abhayagiri Dagaba (370 ft) ranked fifth and Ruwanwelisaya (300 ft) came seventh (the first, fourth and sixth places were held by the Pyramids of Giza).

==== The structure ====
The construction of a dagoba was considered an act of great merit. Dagobas were built to enshrine relics. They were constructed according to strict specifications. Entrances to stupas were laid out so that their centre lines pointed to the relic chambers. There was only one relic chamber initially, but a number of additional relic chambers were introduced when the stupas were rebuilt.

The dagoba is admired today for its structural perfection and stability. Engineers who examined Jetavanaramaya in the 1980s said that its shape was ideal for the materials used. Stupas such as Jetavanarama, Abhayagiri, Ruvanveli and Mirisaveti Stupa were initially in the shape of a paddy heap. Other shapes such as the bubble, pot and bell developed later. It is suggested that the stupa at Nadigamvila digamvila was in the shape of an onion.

An ornamented vahalkada was added to the stupa around the second century; the earliest is at Chaitya. The four vahalkadas face the cardinal points. They are ornamented with figures of animals, flowers, swans and dwarfs. The pillars on either side of the vahalkada carry figures of lions, elephants, horses or bulls, depending on the direction of the structure.

==== Construction ====
The bricks were bonded together using a clay slurry, called butter clay or navanita mattika. This was composed of finely crushed dolomite limestone mixed with sieved sand and clay.

The stupa was thereafter covered with a coating of lime plaster. This was sometimes ten inches thick. There was a range of plasters, using different combinations of materials. The items used included lime, clay, sand, pebbles, crushed seashells, sugar syrup, white of egg, coconut water, plant resin, drying oil, glues and possibly even the saliva of white ants. Some of these items are mentioned in the Mahavamsa. The fine plaster at Kiri Vehera (2nd century) used small pebbles. Crushed seashells mixed with lime and sand were used in the stupas of the fifth to twelfth centuries. Expensive plasters were used sparingly, for specific purposes such as waterproofing.

Stupas in other countries have been struck by lightning, but not in Sri Lanka. Mahavamsa speaks of lightning protection for the stupa. The conical metal cap and its vajra at the top of the dagoba were supposed to have earthing properties. The Mahavamsa also refers to laying a sheet of copper over the foundation and applying arsenic dissolved in sesamum oil on this sheet. This would have kept out white ants and helped prevent plant life from growing inside the stupa.

== Colonial Period ==
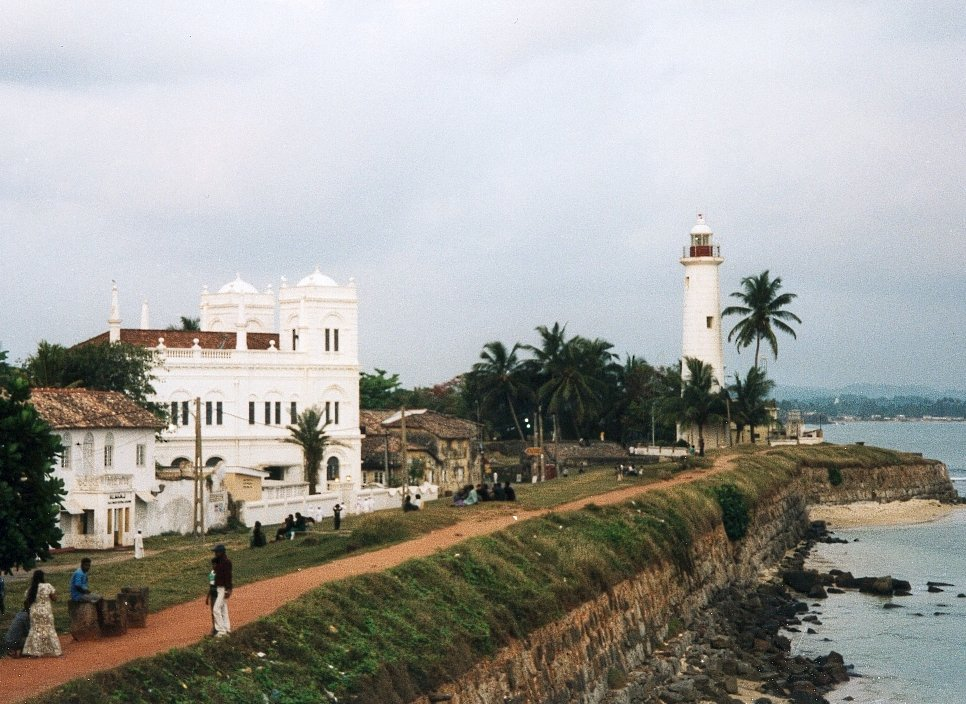
Dutch ramparts of the Galle fort

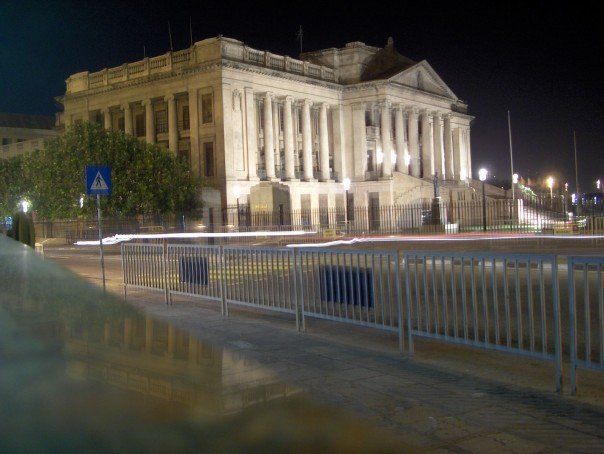
The Neo-Baroque style Old Parliament Building, which is now the Presidential Secretariat

With the arrival of Western colonists to Sri Lanka, they established their own forms of architecture to the island. This is evident in the architecture of the period as well as in forms on influence in modern architecture.

Very few buildings of the Portuguese era survives, but many building from the Dutch era could be found on the coastal parts of the island. For example, the old town of Galle and its fortifications built by the Dutch in the year 1663 make up a UNESCO World Heritage Site. Historic buildings, such as old churches, can be found in many Sri Lankan cities and towns.

Many British-era buildings can be found at Colombo Fort and various other parts of Colombo.

Many important historic buildings were built by the colonial governments. These were often built in a European architectural style that was in fashion at the time, such as the Palladian, Renaissance Classicism, or Neo-classical styles.

== Post Independence ==
Nelum Pokuna Mahinda Rajapaksa Theatre

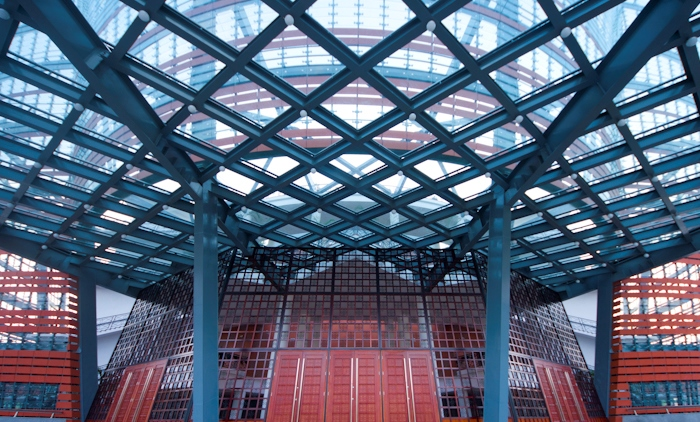
Nelum Pokuna Mahinda Rajapaksa Theatre by Kahawita De Silva & Associates

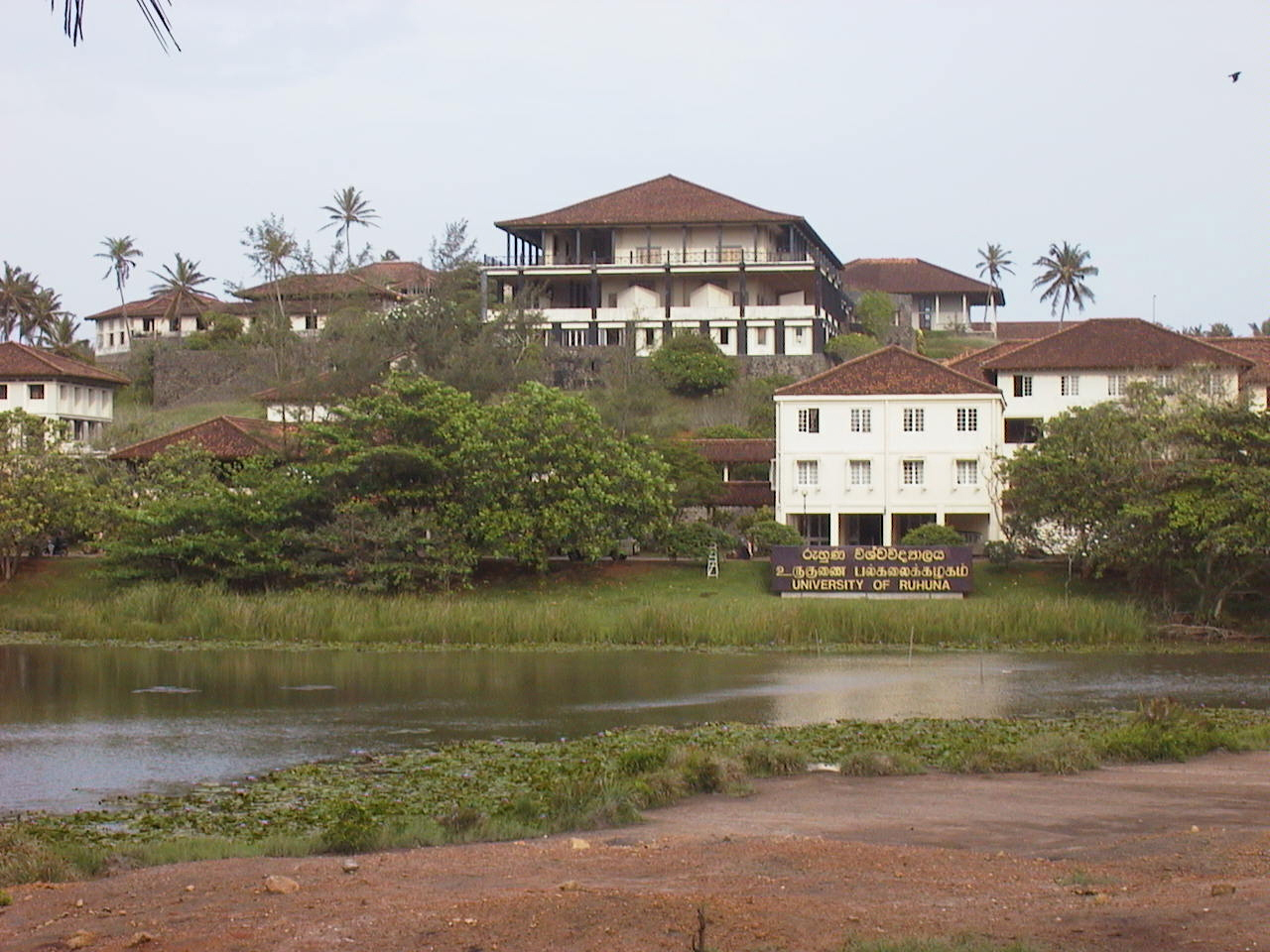
Geoffrey Bawa's design for the University of Ruhuna campus

In the 1960s, 70s, and 80s, architects like Geoffrey Bawa and Minnette de Silva were leading trends in what is today known globally as ‘Tropical Modernism’. The style emphasizes bringing together elements from different times and places in order to create something new and original, with a local aesthetic. Bawa has had a tremendous influence on design and construction in Sri Lanka and many of his trademark embellishments have now become typical in Sri Lankan homes and buildings. The boundaries between indoors and outdoors are often erased, moved, or made more subtle, in Bawa's work. Older Sri Lankan influences, like reflecting pools, colonnaded passages, and terra-cotta-tiled roofs, are fused with the modernist emphasis of flowing spaces and clean lines. His work has also been a significant influence on architecture across South and Southeast Asia. Today, tropical modernist architecture can also be found in Brazil, Puerto Rico, Hawaii and Ghana among other places.

Bawa's legacy is felt in the work of many Sri Lankan architects, who continue the traditions of Tropical Modernism. Architects, like Channa Daswatte, continue to design in this style, paying close attention to how the designed environment interacts with the climate and the needs of the users.

By the 2000s and 2010s, there was also a presence of postmodernism, creating modern monumental architecture, through the incorporation of historical Sri Lankan cultural elements to convey meaning and context. The Nelum Pokuna Mahinda Rajapaksa Theatre in Colombo, by Kahawita De Silva & Associates, is an example of using a historical landscape design feature, the Nelum Pokuna in Polonnaruwa, to create a modern national monument to celebrate the country's arts. Several of buildings that are proposed/under-construction like the Altair Residential Towers, Krrish Square and ITC Colombo One have postmodern architectural designs.

By the 2010s the idea of Sustainable architecture has appeared in Sri Lanka, the 186m(610 ft) tall Clear Point Residencies building which is expected to be the world's tallest vertical garden and use harvested rainwater, recycled bathroom sink and shower water with a drip irrigation system to water the plants. The plants naturally cool the buildings and clean the air thus reducing the need for air conditioning.

== See also ==
- Architecture of ancient Sri Lanka
- Forts of Sri Lanka
- Das Buddhistische Haus, a Buddhist temple in Berlin, Germany that is based on Sri Lankan architecture
