= Achilleion =

Achilleion (ancient Greek: Ἀχίλλειον) may refer to:

- Achilleion, Colombo, a 50-storey twin-tower apartment in Sri Lanka
- Achilleion (Corfu), a palace on the island of Corfu, Greece
- Achilleion (Ionia), an ancient city in present-day Anatolia
- Achilleion (Thessaly), a Neolithic site in Thessaly, Greece
- Achilleion (Troad), a Greek polis in the Troad, Turkey
