= Inclined building =

Building that was intentionally built at an incline

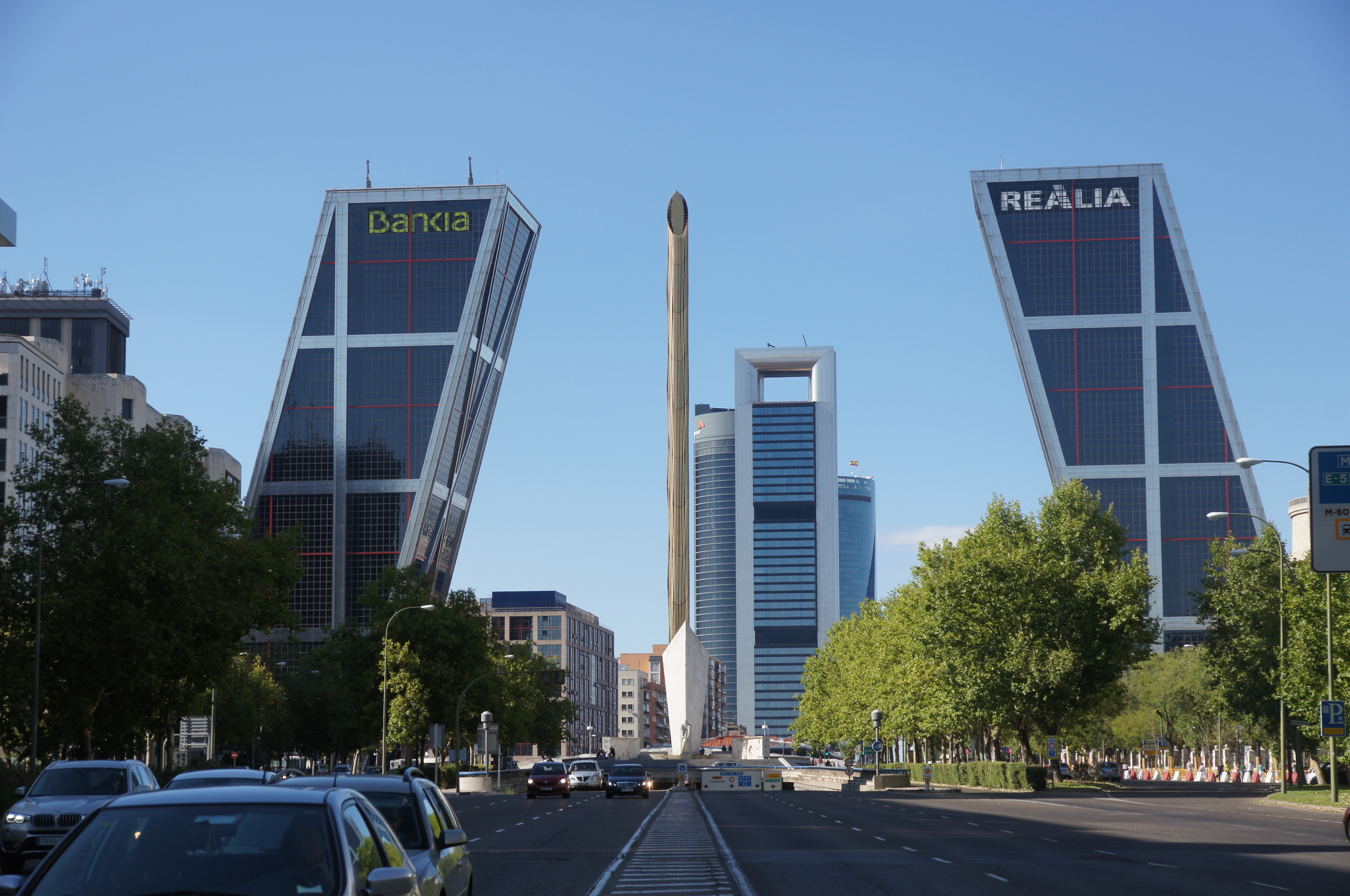
Puerta de Europa, the first inclined skyscrapers ever built.

An inclined building is a building that was intentionally built at an incline. Buildings are built with an incline primarily for aesthetics, offering a unique feature to a city's skyline, as well as framing other buildings and structures between them when built in pairs.

== Design ==
Despite the outward appearance of an inclined building as "leaning-over", they are as structurally sound as any non-inclined building. The mass of the building's upper floors is always equal or less than the mass of the building's lower floors, ensuring the building remains balanced around its centre of mass.

The upward slope of an inclined building is not to be confused with the upward slope of an otherwise non-inclined building, such as 122 Leadenhall Street in London. It should also not be confused with the top-heavy design of an otherwise non-inclined building, such as Vancouver House in Vancouver.

== Tallest inclined buildings ==
As of October 2019, this list includes all intentionally inclined buildings (completed and architecturally topped out) which reach a height of 30 metres (98 ft) or more, as assessed by their highest architectural feature. This includes spires and architectural details but does not include antenna masts.

bold	Denotes building that is or was once the tallest in the world

Rank	Name	Image	Location	Country	Height m (ft)	Floors	Inclination	Completed	Notes	Ref
1	Altair - East Tower		Colombo	Sri Lanka	209.1 m (686 ft)	68	13.8°	2019	Completed 2021. Tallest inclined building in the world since 2019, as well as the tallest building in Sri Lanka.	
2	Capital Gate		Abu Dhabi	United Arab Emirates	164.7 m (540 ft)	36	18°	2011	Tallest inclined building in the world from 2011 to 2019.	
3	American Copper Buildings - East Tower		New York City, New York	United States	143.1 m (469 ft)	40	7°	2017		
4	Veer Towers		Las Vegas, Nevada	United States	137 m (449 ft)	37	5°	2010	Tallest inclined buildings in the world from 2010 to 2011. Tallest inclined twin buildings in the world since 2010.	
5	Marina Tower Melbourne		Melbourne, Victoria	Australia	134.9 m (443 ft)	43	5°	2017	Tallest inclined building in the Southern Hemisphere.	
6	Puerta de Europa		Madrid	Spain	113.8 m (373 ft)	26	15°	1996	Tallest inclined buildings in the world from 1996 to 2010.	
7	AC Hotel Bella Sky Copenhagen		Copenhagen	Denmark	76.5 m (251 ft)	24	15°	2011		
8	City Hall		London	United Kingdom	45.1 m (148 ft)	10	?	2002		
9	Museum of the Second World War		Gdańsk	Poland	40.6 m (133 ft)	6	56°	2017		
10	Dockland Office Building		Hamburg	Germany	39.9 m (131 ft)	8	66°	2005	Features an inclination of 66°, the most of any inclined building.	
11	Wellington International Airport ATC Tower		Wellington	New Zealand	32 m (105 ft)	8	12.5°	2018	Also known as "the leaning tower of Rongotai".	

== Other Examples ==
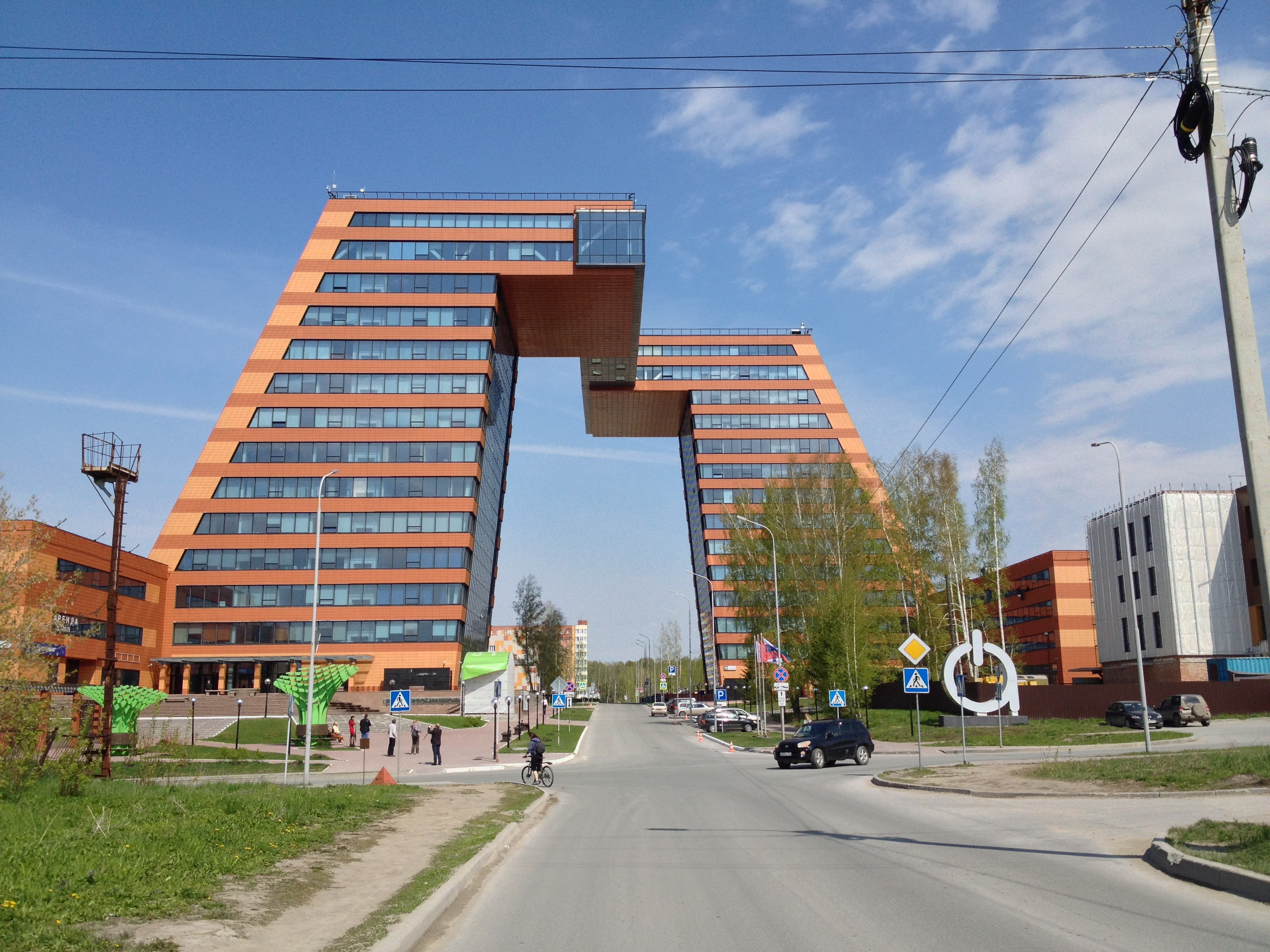
"The Geese" of Akademgorodok, Russia.

- A pair of 101m (331ft) tall inclined buildings featuring a 15° tilt can be found in Chongqing, China.
- A pair of inclined buildings connected by a skybridge can be found in Akademgorodok, a town located 30 km south of Novosibirsk, Russia.
- An inclined office building is proposed as part of the new "Brighouse Village" redevelopment located across the street from Richmond Centre in Richmond, British Columbia.

== See also ==
- Inclined tower
- List of leaning towers
- List of tallest buildings
