= Overseas Realty =

Sri Lankan real estate company

Overseas Realty (Ceylon) PLC
- Logo of Overseas Realty

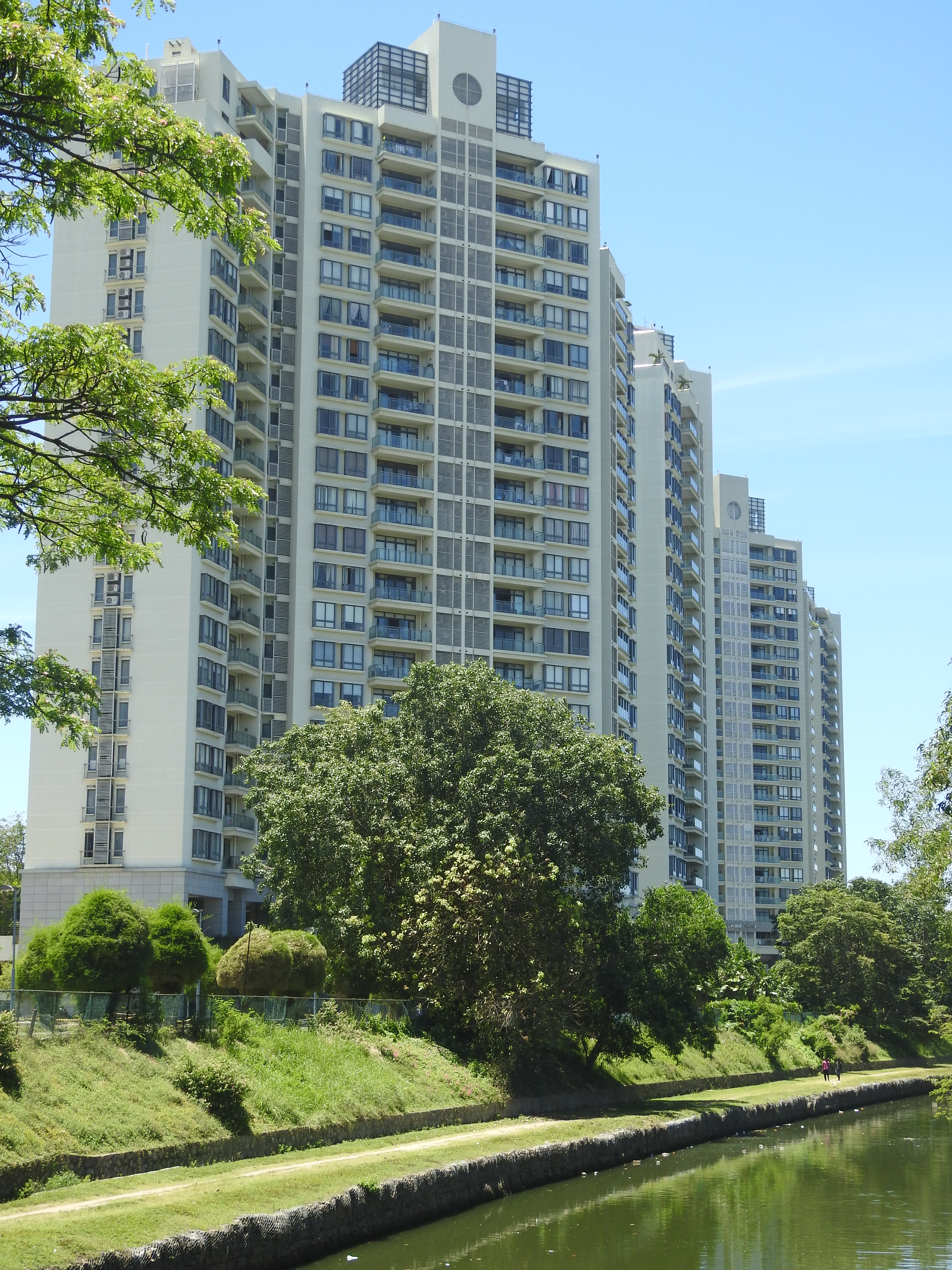
- Havelock City is the largest mixed-use development project undertaken in Sri Lanka
- Company type: Public
- Traded as: CSE: OSEA.N0000
- ISIN: LK0133N00005
- Industry: Real estate
- Founded: 28 October 1980; 45 years ago
- Founder: Shing Pee Tao
- Headquarters: Colombo, Sri Lanka
- Key people: Ajit Jayaratne (Chairman); Pravir Samarasinghe (Group CEO)
- Revenue: ▼LKR5.076 billion (2023)
- Operating income: ▼LKR2.661 billion (2023)
- Net income: ▼LKR3.853 billion (2023)
- Total assets: ▼LKR78.234 billion (2023)
- Total equity: ▲LKR54.119 billion (2023)
- Owners: Shing Kwan Investment Company Limited (38.43%); Unity Builders Limited (18.66%); Shing Kwan (Pte.) Ltd (12.77%)
- Website: www.orcl.lk

Overseas Realty (Ceylon) PLC is the largest listed real estate company in Sri Lanka. The company is the developer and the proprietor of World Trade Center Colombo and Havelock City. The company was incorporated in 1980 and was listed on the Colombo Stock Exchange in 1982. The company is ranked amongst the LMD 100, moving 17 positions up to number 76 for the fiscal year 2019/20.

== History ==
Overseas Realty was founded in 1980 and was quoted on the Colombo Stock Exchange in 1982. Shing Kwan Group, a Singaporean investment company led by Shing Pee Tao acquired the company in 1991. The groundbreaking of the World Trade Center Colombo took place in 1992. The twin towers were declared open on 12 October 1997 by President Chandrika Bandaranaike Kumaratunga and Shing Pee Tao. Three days later, a bombing attack by the LTTE left 17 people (including 12 perpetrators) killed and about 100 people wounded. The twin towers were restored and recommissioned in June 1998.

The groundbreaking for Havelock City commenced on 18 May 2004. It is the largest mixed use development project undertaken in Sri Lanka. The fourth and final phase of Havelock City development was completed in August 2021. Mireka Tower, a 50-storey commercial tower on the site of Havelock City, was topped out in August 2020. Chairman of the company, Shing Pee Tao died on 24 September 2021. Ajit Jayaratne was appointed as the new chairman of the company on 27 October 2021. The former Deputy Chairman, Hussein Cassim died on 20 September 2020. He served on the board of directors from 1991 until his demise.

== Operations ==
Shing Kwan Group holds 61% of the company's stocks. The company recorded a LKR1.97 billion revenue for the third quarter of 2021. LKR1.3 billion in revenue was generated by the sales of apartments. Overseas Realty (Ceylon) was one of the constituents of the S&P Sri Lanka 20 Index until 2020 yearend index rebalance.

== See also ==
- List of companies listed on the Colombo Stock Exchange
- List of Sri Lankan public corporations by market capitalisation
