= Havelock City =

- The four towers of Phase-1 and Phase-2, in March 2017.

- Location within Colombo Municipality

General information
- Status: Completed
- Type: Mixed-use
- Location: Colombo, Sri Lanka
- Coordinates: 06°52′56″N 79°52′00″E
- Construction started: May 18, 2004; 22 years ago
- Completed: 2023
- Opening: April 2009 (Apartment); 21 October 2022 (Mireka Tower); 27 May 2023 (Havelock City Mall)
- Cost: US$166 million (Mireka Tower only)
- Owner: Mireka Capital Land, a subsidiary of Overseas Realty (Ceylon)

Technical details
- Floor count: 22–50
- Lifts/elevators: 24+

Design and construction
- Architects: Senaka Dharmatilleke; ECADI; DGFI
- Main contractor: Singapore Piling & Civil Engineering (Phase 1); SCG (Phase 1); ICC Construction (Phase 2-4); CHEC (Mireka Tower & Havelock City Mall)

Havelock City is a large mixed-use real-estate project in Colombo, Sri Lanka. The residential component of the project consists of eight residential towers and the commercial component of the project consists of a 46-storey office tower and shopping mall built to international standards. It is popular for its clubhouse, 2.8 ha (7 acres) garden, and the overall size of the project. The first four residential towers, namely Park Tower and Elibank Tower (of construction Phase-1), and Layards Tower and Davidson Tower (of construction Phase-2), were completed as at early 2017 with 22 floors each, and is currently occupied by residents. Phase-3 is currently under construction, and will consist of the Stratford Tower and Melford Tower, with 28 floors each. Piling for Phase-4 was done with Phase-3 to expedite development. Both phases is estimated to cost over US$130 million.

At a cost of US$166 million, the 46-storey commercial skyscraper will have 600,000 ft^{2} (56,000 m^{2}) of office space and 200,000 ft^{2} (19,000 m^{2}) for the shopping mall. The ground-breaking ceremony for the commercial component was ceremonially conducted on 29 December 2016 with the auspices of S. P. Tao, the chairman of Overseas Realty, along with other dignitaries such as ministers Mangala Samaraweera and Champika Ranawaka.

== Construction ==
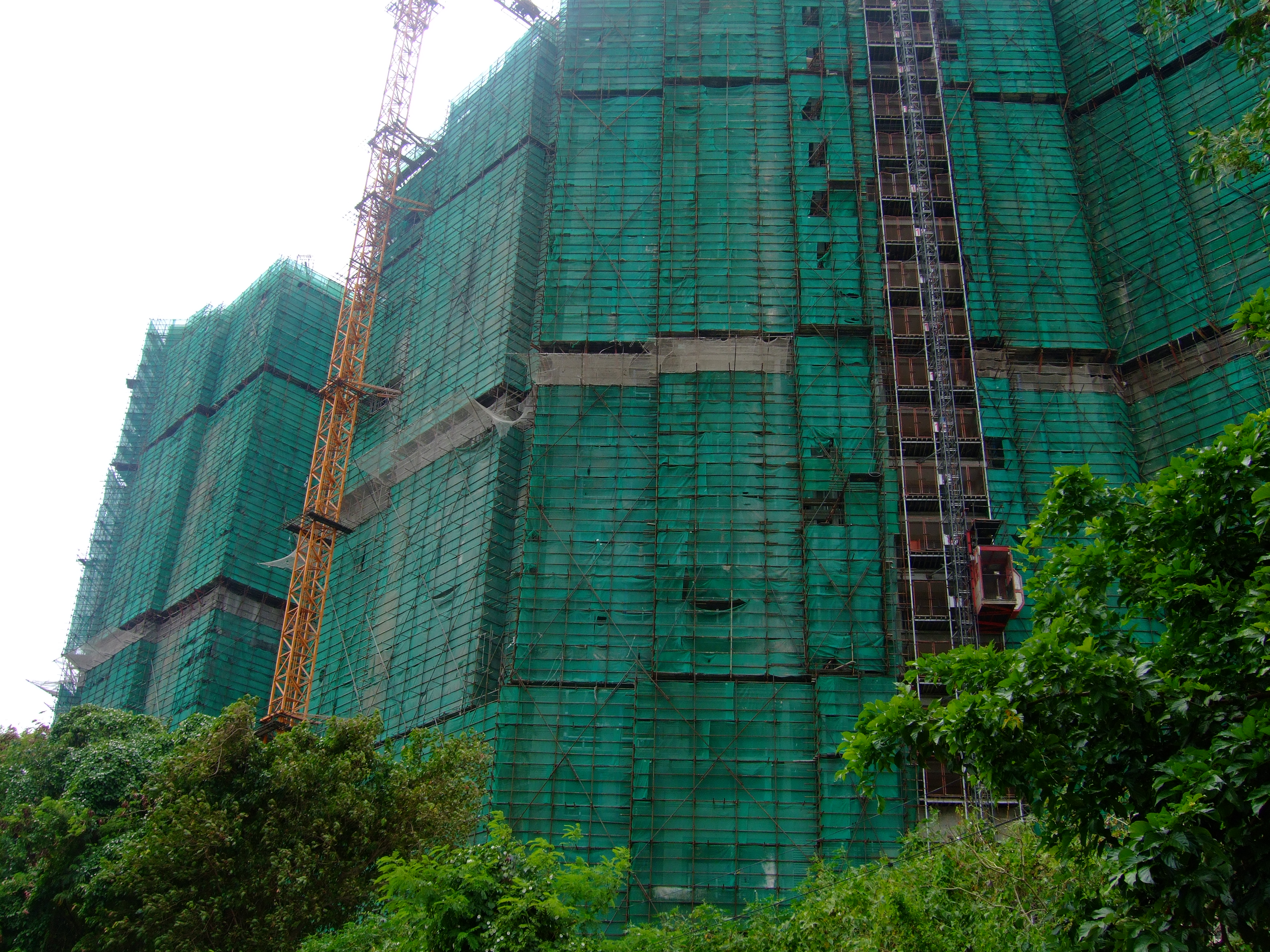
Construction of Phase-1 in August 2008

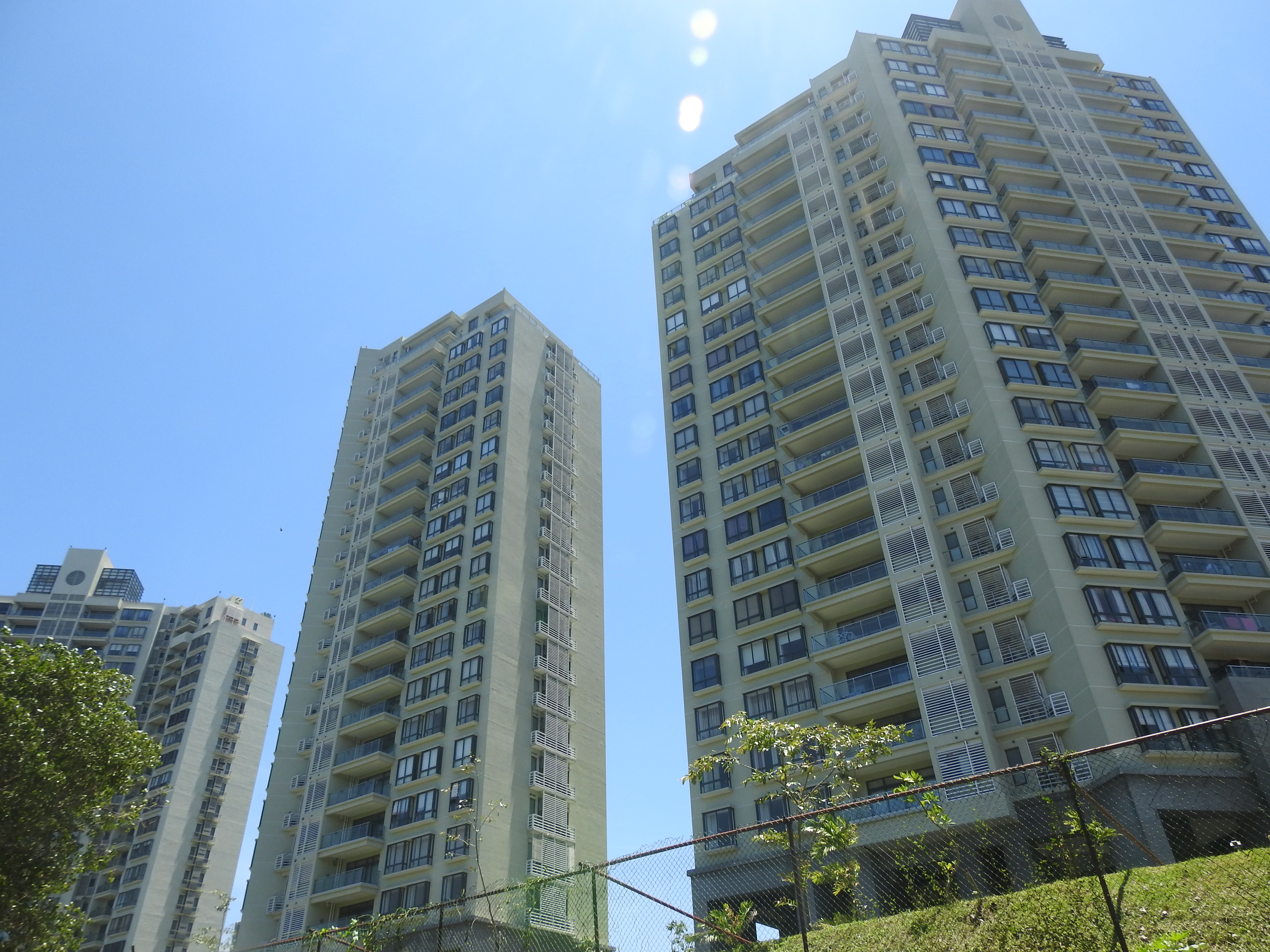
Two of the towers in March 2017

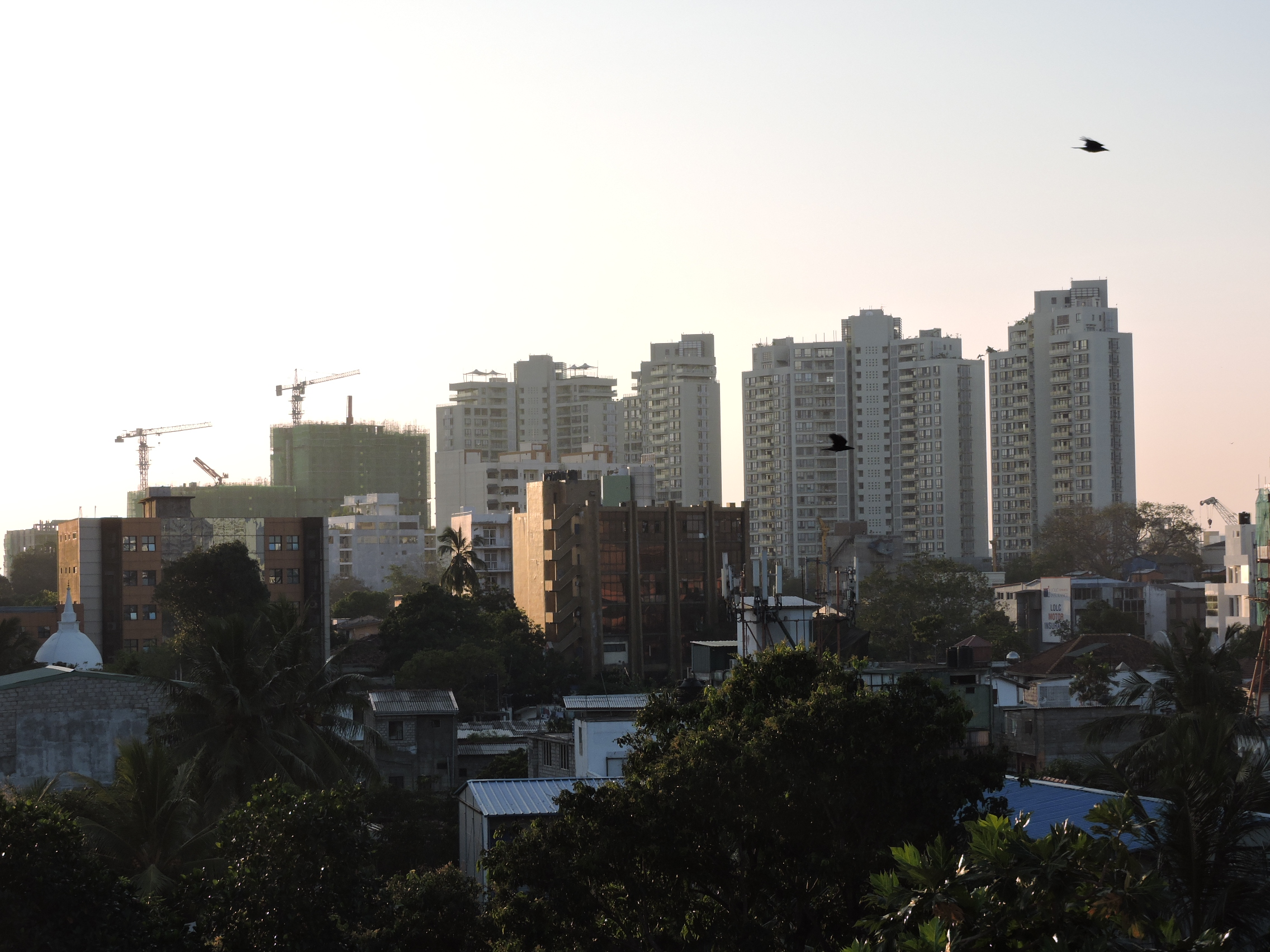
Stratford Tower and Melford Tower (Phase 3) under construction and Park Tower and Elibank Tower (of construction Phase-1), and Layards Tower and Davidson Tower (of construction Phase-2) can be seen

East China Architecture Design and Research Institute (ECADI) and Design Group Five International of Sri Lanka are the leading architects of the project. Havelock City is developed and managed by Mireka Capital Land (Pvt) Ltd, a fully own subsidiary of Overseas Realty (Ceylon) PLC.

The project is being built on a single 7 ha (18-acre) site, once the premises of the Wellawatta Spinning and Weaving Mills. Prior to construction commencing, the land was the largest cleared land in Colombo.

== List towers ==
Name	Use	Year	Floors	Ref
Mireka Tower	Commercial	2022	50	
Havelock City Mall	Shopping complex	2023	6	
Edmonton Tower	Residential	2021	31	
Peterson Tower	Residential	2021	31	
Stratford Tower	Residential	2016	28	
Melford Tower	Residential	2016	28	
Layards Tower	Residential	2014	22	
Davidson Tower	Residential	2014	22	
Elibank Tower	Residential	2009	22	
Park Tower	Residential	2009	22	

== Bridge ==
The Havelock City Bridge is a 37 m (120 ft) beam bridge which connects the Havelock City premises at the southeast of the bridge, to Skelton Road in the northwest. The bridge's ground-breaking ceremony was held 4 September 2008, and completed in late 2012. The bridge was constructed by the Sri Lankan engineering firm International Construction Consortium at a cost of US$ 1.27 million.

== See also ==
- List of tallest structures in Sri Lanka
