= ITC Ratnadipa =

Building in Colombo, Sri Lanka

- ITC Ratnadipa in May 2024
- Interactive map of the ITC Ratnadipa area
- Former names: ITC Colombo One; ITC One Colombo
- Hotel chain: ITC Hotels

General information
- Location: Colombo, Sri Lanka
- Coordinates: 6°55′33.2″N 79°50′41.5″E
- Opening: April 2024
- Owner: WelcomHotels Lanka Pvt. Ltd

Height
- Height: 140 metres (460 ft)

Technical details
- Floor count: 33

Design and construction
- Architecture firm: Gensler
- Structural engineer: Thornton Tomasetti
- Main contractor: Larsen & Toubro

Other information
- Number of rooms: 352
- Number of restaurants: 12

Website
- www.itchotels.com/in/en/itcratnadipa-colombo

ITC Ratnadipa (Sinhala: අයිටීසී රත්නදීප, lit. 'ITC Gem Island') is a luxury hotel in Colombo, Sri Lanka. The hotel is part of the Indian hotel chain ITC Hotels, while WelcomHotels Lanka Pvt. Ltd, a subsidiary of ITC Limited, is the proprietor. Ratnadipa (meaning 'island of gems') was a historical name for Sri Lanka. The hotel is located adjacent to the Galle Face Green and next to Shangri-La Colombo and Taj Samudra hotels. It is ITC Hotels' first foreign investment. The hotel is 140 metres (460 ft) tall and accompanied by a 224 metres (735 ft) tall Sapphire Residences building. The two buildings are connected by Ahasa One, a 55 metres (180 ft) sky bridge. The sky bridge is built 100 metres (330 ft) above ground, connecting 19-21 levels of the two buildings. The groundbreaking of the hotel took place on 19 November 2014. The project was intended to open in 2017 but was delayed several times. WelcomHotels Lanka received its third extension in seven years to commence operations. The project received strategic investment status from the government of Sri Lanka and received tax breaks. The hotel was inaugurated by Sri Lankan president Ranil Wickremesinghe on 25 April 2024.

== History ==
The groundbreaking ceremony of ITC Colombo One took place on 19 November 2014 with the attendance of the minister of Economic Development Basil Rajapaksa, and the Indian High Commissioner to Sri Lanka Y. K. Sinha. ITC Hotels invested US$300 million to the project. The hotel is located adjacent to the Galle Face Green. The project was expected to be completed by 2017. The initial plan was for the hotel to have 350 rooms and 130 luxury apartments. At the time, it was one of the largest foreign investments in Colombo. Access Engineering secured the piling work contract of the project in January 2016. That was the second time Access Engineering awarded a contract for the project. In 2015, the engineering company completed the excavation and shoring work of the project.

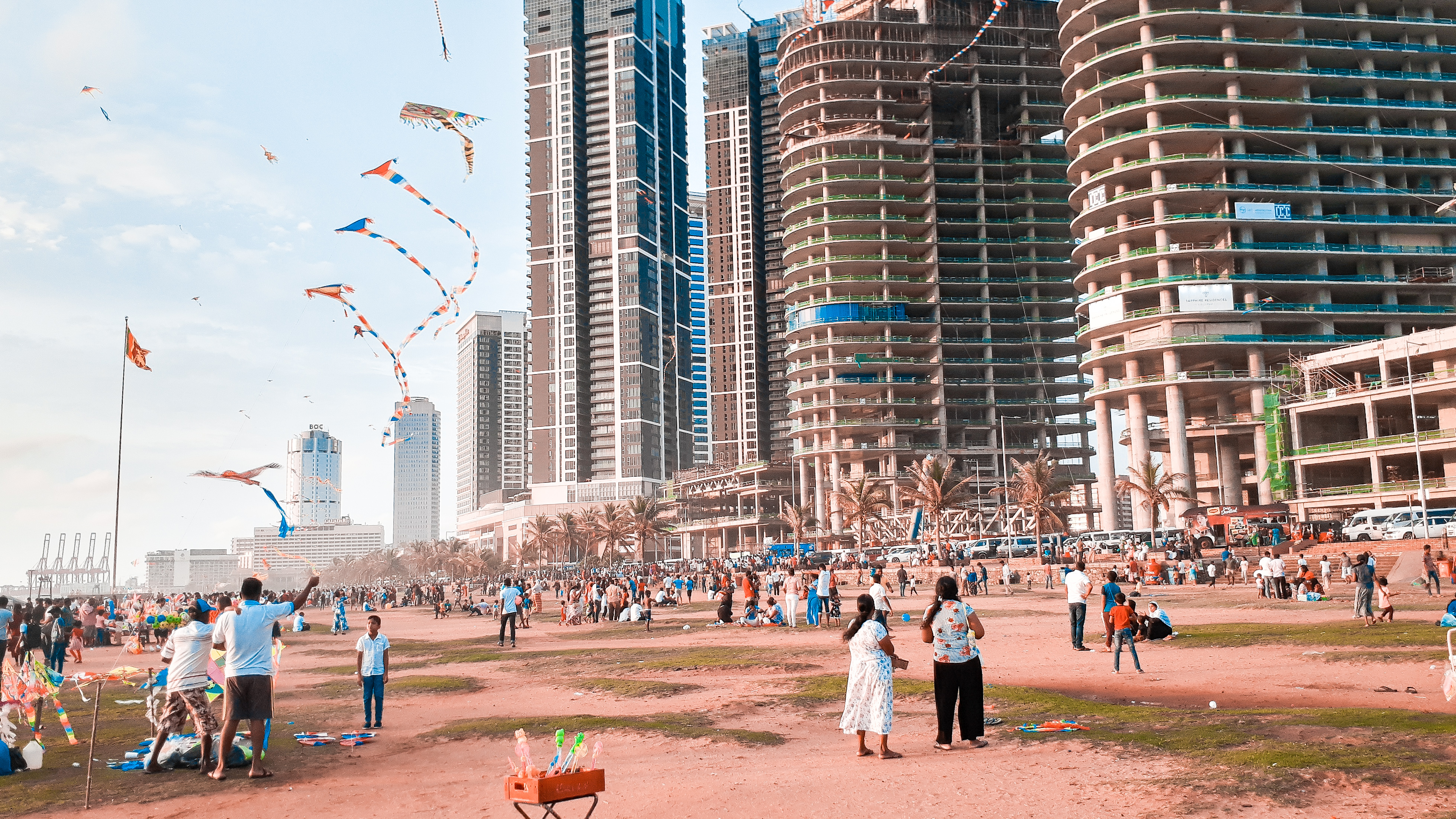
The construction site of ITC Ratnadipa as seen across Galle Face Green, c. September 2019

In July 2018, WelcomHotels Lanka announced that ITC One Hotel and Sapphire Residences will be completed by 2021. ITC Hotels launched Sapphire Residences on 2 October 2018. The occasion was celebrated with a musical concert held in Nelum Pokuna Mahinda Rajapaksa Theatre. The concert was supported by the Indian High Commission in Sri Lanka. Sixty musicians performed in the concert, including an on-stage collaboration of L. Subramaniam and the Liepāja Symphony Orchestra. The Sapphire Residences building is 224 metres (735 ft) tall, and the hotel component stands at 140 metres (460 ft). The two buildings is connected by Ahasa One, a 55 metres (180 ft) long sky bridge connecting 19-21 levels of the two buildings. It is the first sky bridge in South Asia. The sky bridge built by the Larsen & Toubro.

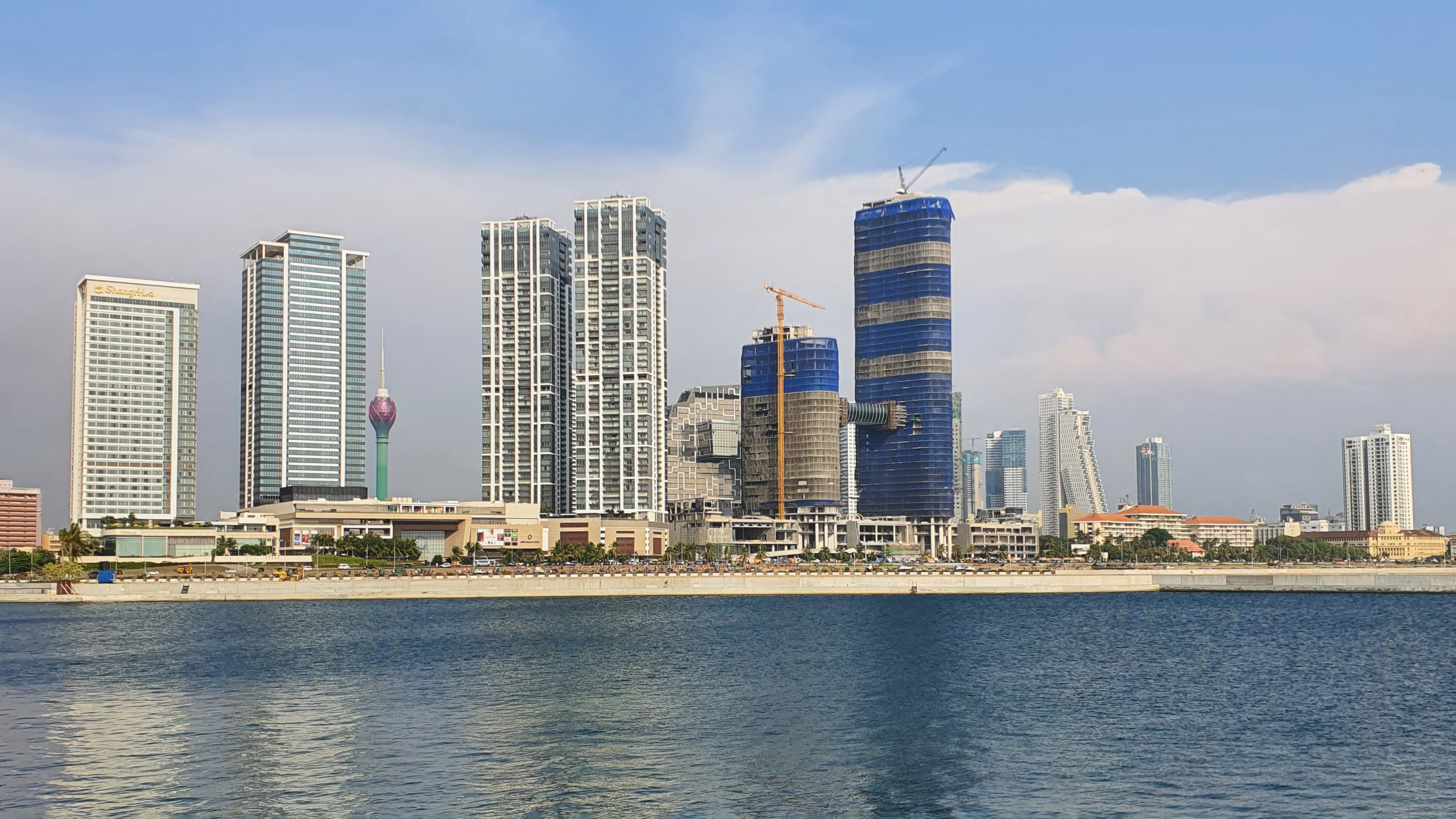
ITC Ratnadipa construction site (centre-right), c. January 2022

A documentary film titled Making of the Iconic Ahasa One Sky Bridge aired on Ada Derana on 30 May 2021. Ahasa One built above 100 metres (330 ft). The sky bridge accommodates two 50 metres (160 ft) long infinity pools and a jazz lounge and bar. In May 2021, WelcomHotels Lanka received an 18-month extension to commence commercial operation begins on 1 January 2022 from the Ministry of Finance Mahinda Rajapaksa. The project was gazetted under the Strategic Development Act in October 2012 and received generous tax breaks. ITC Limited stated in its 2021/22 annual report that the project impeded by the Sri Lankan economic crisis. The project was running on schedule until the third quarter of 2019. The project completed superstructure construction in of the residence building, the hotel and the Podium, the commercial and retail area in June 2022.

== Operations ==
In June 2023, Sujeet Kumar was appointed as the general manager of ITC Ratnadipa. Kumar previously worked as pre-operational general manager of Sheraton Colombo in 2016. In July 2023, the opening of the hotel delayed yet again. WelcomHotels Lanka received its third extension in seven years from President Ranil Wickremesinghe as the minister of Investment Promotion. The project received 5.86 acres (2.37 ha) land and is exempted from foreign exchange regulations. The hotel was inaugurated by president Ranil Wickremesinghe on 25 April 2024. Prime Minister Dinesh Gunawardena and the Indian High Commissioner to Sri Lanka Santosh Jha also participated in the event.

== See also ==
- List of hotels in Sri Lanka
