= Kokavil transmission tower =

- கொக்காவில் தொலைத்தொடர்பு கோபுரம் කොකාවිල් සම්ප්‍රේෂණ කුළුණ
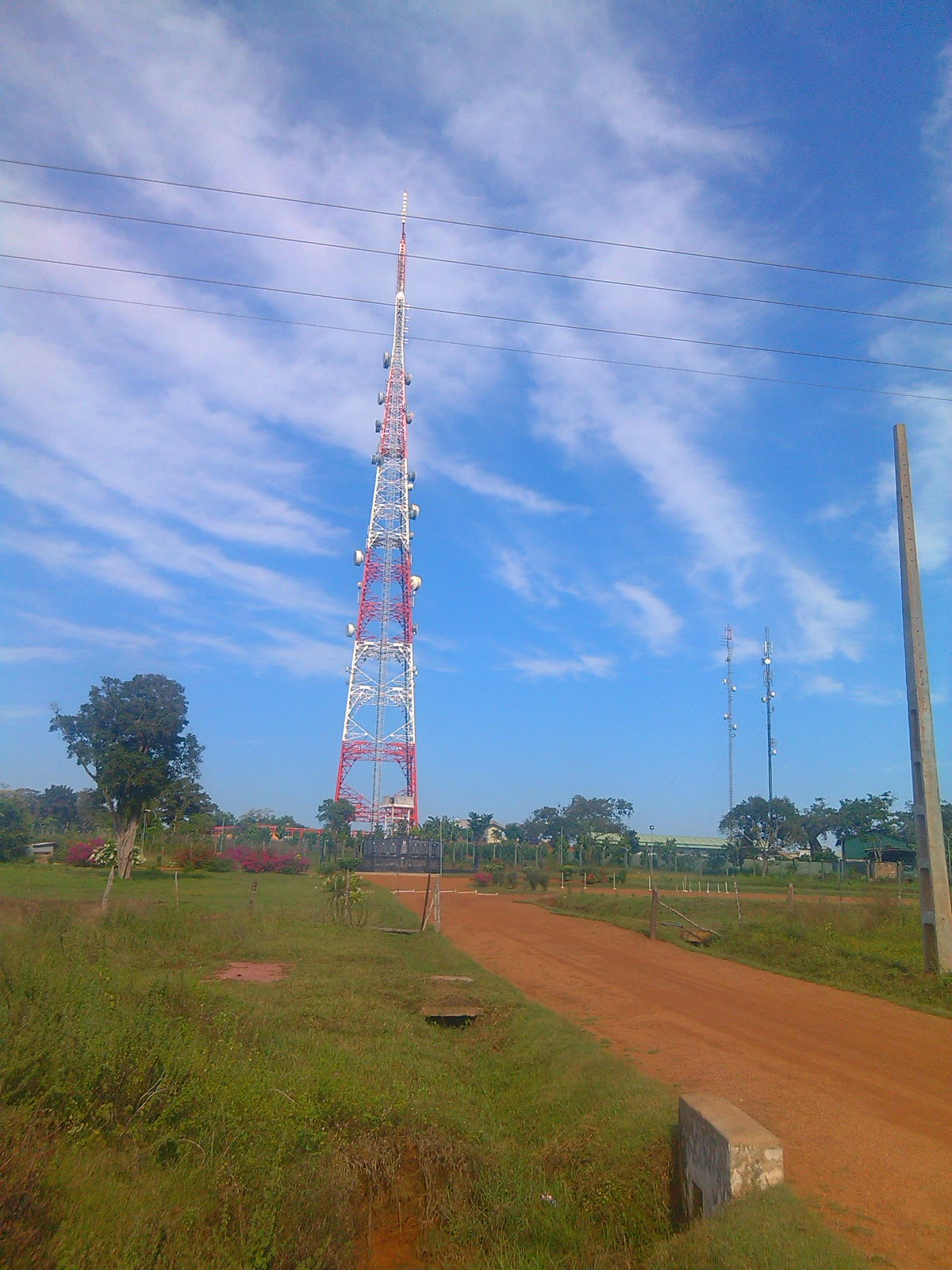
- Kokavil transmission tower in 2015

- Location within Northern Province

General information
- Status: Completed
- Type: Multi-functional transmission tower
- Architectural style: lattice tower
- Location: Kokavil, Mullaitivu, Sri Lanka, Sri Lanka
- Coordinates: 09°16′10.85″N 80°24′28.96″E
- Completed: 1982 (Restored in 2011)
- Opening: 6 June 2011
- Demolished: 2006
- Cost: LKR 330 million

Height
- Roof: 174 m (571 ft)

Kokavil transmission tower (Tamil: கொக்காவில் தொலைத்தொடர்பு கோபுரம், romanized: Kokkāvil Tolaittoṭarpu Kōpuram; Sinhala: කොකාවිල් සම්ප්‍රේෂණ කුළුණ, romanized: Kokāvil Samprēṣaṇa Kuḷuṇa), often nicknamed Kokavil Tower, is a 174 m (571 ft) tall multi-functional transmission tower at Kokavil, Mullaitivu, Sri Lanka, which is used for television, radio and telecommunication transmissions as well as military communications. Its mast structure is made of lattice steel.

== History ==
Kokavil transmission tower was built in 1982 as a part of grant-aid provided by the Government of Japan. It was a guyed mast tower. It provided analog television transmission on VHF band of frequencies to the Northern part of the island beyond Vavuniya. Kokavil area came under the control of Tamil Tigers in 1990. Before this the Kokavil Tower had been destroyed by the LTTE. However, the Tamil Tigers had utilised the location for their transmissions, including Voice of Tigers using a smaller temporary tower. In 2006, it was bombed and destroyed by Sri Lankan Air Force.

== Restoration/New tower ==
After the end of civil war, Government of Sri Lanka rebuilt the tower by spending 330 million Sri Lankan Rupees constructing it at a location closer to the original site. Now, the tower provides digital television transmission (using DVB-T2) and Analog television transmission to the northern part of Sri Lanka.
