= 447 Luna Tower =

- Location within Central Colombo

General information
- Status: Completed
- Type: Residential
- Location: Colombo, Sri Lanka, 447, Union Place, Colombo 00200, Colombo, Sri Lanka
- Coordinates: 6.918971°N 79.861821°E
- Construction started: 2016
- Completed: 2021

Technical details
- Floor count: 44

Design and construction
- Architect: PWA Architects
- Developer: Belluna Co. Ltd, Japan

Website
- www.bellunalanka.lk/447-luna-tower/

447 Luna Tower is a residential development in Colombo, Sri Lanka. At 44 storeys, the building is one of the most recognizable buildings in Union Place, Colombo. This residential development is among the residential giants of the Colombo cityscape, accompanied by 202 luxury living spaces spanned over 44 stories. It is the only residential development in Colombo to feature a distinctive green wall and plant troughs within the premises. The building is situated on a land located at Union Place, Colombo 002. Ground breaking started in 2016.

447 Luna Tower's superstructure was completed in August 2019, the handover will commence in 2021.

== Apartment Features ==
447 Luna Tower consists of 202 apartments (consisting of two bedroom, three bedroom and four bedroom apartments) ranging from 77.9 m^{2} (839 sq ft) to over 210.98 m^{2} (2,271.0 sq ft). Additionally, the development will also have a rooftop infinity pool. The residential development offers amenities such as a Clubhouse, Gymnasium, Kids' play area, Lounge, and a Garden terrace, which is located on the seventh floor and spans around the tower.

== Developer ==
Belluna Co. Ltd is a Japanese company that is traded on the Tokyo Stock Exchange. It has a diverse portfolio, with main assets in the real estate sector spanning the globe from Myanmar to the United States, including Hollywood and Los Angeles projects.
