= Saliya Upul Aladeniya =

Sri Lankan army officer (1963–1990)

Captain Saliya Upul Aladeniya † PWV
- Born: Samarakoon Wasala Mudiyanselage Saliya Upul Aladeniya; 1 March 1963; Lewella, Kandy
- Died: 11 July 1990 (aged 27); Kokavil, Sri Lanka
- Spouse: Iyantha Abeysinghe
- Military career
- Allegiance: Sri Lanka
- Branch: Sri Lanka Army
- Service years: 1989–1990
- Rank: Captain
- Service number: (O/3113)
- Unit: Sri Lanka Sinha Regiment
- Commands: Officer-in-command, Kokavil Army Camp
- Conflicts: Insurrection 1987–89, Sri Lankan civil war
- Awards: Parama Weera Vibhushanaya

Captain Samarakoon Wasala Mudiyanselage Saliya Upul Aladeniya, PWV, SLSR (in Sinhalese: කපිතාන් සාලිය උපුල් අලදෙනිය; 1 March 1963 – 11 June 1990) was a Sri Lankan army officer and the second recipient of the Parama Weera Vibhushanaya, Sri Lanka's highest wartime award for valor. He was commanding the small army detachment at Kokavil, when it was surrounded. He refused to abandon the injured and fought until they were overrun by the Liberation Tigers of Tamil Eelam (LTTE).

== Early life ==
Born in Kandy, his father was a planter in the State Plantations Corporation and a captain in the Ceylon Volunteer Force. He had two siblings. Educated at Trinity College Kandy, he worked on a small estate owned by his family.

== Military service ==
He joined the Sri Lanka Army in 1989 as a volunteer officer. Following a short commissioning course at the Sri Lanka Military Academy, he was commissioned as second lieutenant in the 2nd (V) Battalion, Sri Lanka Sinha Regiment. He served with the battalion in Nuwara Eliya during the later stages of the 1987–1989 JVP insurrection. He was later transferred to the 3rd (V) Battalion, Sinha Regiment and was attached to the A company.

=== Battle of Kokavil ===
On 18 May 1990, the A Company with three officers was deployed the Mankulam. Two officers and 58 men from A Company was dispatched to an isolated army outpost at Kokuvla (Kokavil) that was established for guarding the television relay station. Aladeniya as a Second Lieutenant was part of that detachment. On June 5, the LTTE Mankulam and was repulsed killing 43 militants.

On the 11 June 1990, the Sri Lankan government ordered over 600 police officers to surrender to the LTTE after their police stations were surrounded, who were then massacred. The next day Mankulam and Kokavil were surrounded by the LTTE. On June 16, there was a ceasefire, the Captain in charge of the camp and fifteen others went on leave. Leaving Lieutenant Aladeniya in charge.

On 27 June, the camp was surrounded for several days by LTTE cadres who outnumbered them five to one. The food and water were running out in the camp and so was the ammunition. In spite of many requests, reinforcements sent from Wanni headquarters never reached Kokavil, having been diverted elsewhere. On July 11, orders to withdraw from the camp came at the eleventh hour but then it was too late and Aladeniya had wounded men whom he did not want to leave behind. Pledging that he would rather die alongside them than leave them, Lt. Aladeniya ordered the only civilian in the camp (a cook) to leave and fought on till an adjacent fuel dump exploded, killing the majority of the defenders in the camp. Since his body was not recovered he was not listed as missing in action. Final words spoken by Lt. Aladeniya to Wanni headquarters were,

Don’t worry sir, I will fight till I die.

Aladeniya was posthumously promoted to rank of captain and awarded the Parama Weera Vibhushanaya medal on June 21, 1994, by the president DB Wijetunga. In offensive operations in 2009, the Sri Lanka Army recaptured Kokavil. In 2011, the transmission tower was rebuilt and a monument to Aladeniya and his men was built.

== Family ==
At the time of his death Aladeniya was married to Iyantha Abeysinghe https://commons.wikimedia.org/wiki/File:Saliya_Aladeniya_Wedding_Photo.jpg

== See also ==
- Awards and decorations of the military of Sri Lanka
