= Achilleion (Ionia) =

Ancient city in Ionia

Achilleion (Ancient Greek: Ἀχιλλεῖον) was a town of ancient Ionia. Xenophon records that, in 398 BCE, soldiers of Achilleion were part of the army that, under the command of the Spartan Dercylidas, faced troops of Achaemenid Empire led by the satraps Tissaphernes and Pharnabazus II, who had crossed the river Maeander. At the meeting between both armies, the troops of Dercylidas, the Peloponnesians were ready to fight, but part of those of the cities of Priene and of Achilleion, and those of the islands and Ionian cities fled and those who remained would not resist. However, Tissaphernes sent some delegates to parley with Dercylidas and they reached an agreement by which they took guarantees and hostages and the armies withdrew, the Greeks to Leucophrys and the Persians to Tralles. The next day in the place they had agreed to, they negotiated peace. The Persians would allow the Greek cities to be autonomous and the Greek army and the Laconian harmosts would return across the Aegean Sea. In another passage, Xenophon situates Achilleion between the cities of the valley of the Maeander river, like Priene and Leucophrys, where the Spartan Thimbron established his bases to fight against Struthas. The geographer Stephanus of Byzantium also cites a fort named Achilleion but located next to Smyrna and, therefore, is not identifiable with this Achilleion.

Its site is unlocated.
