= Capitol TwinPeaks =

Building in Colombo, Sri Lanka

- Location in Central Colombo

General information
- Status: Completed
- Location: Colombo, Sri Lanka, 24 Staple Street, Colombo 00200, Sri Lanka, Colombo, Sri Lanka
- Coordinates: 6.9189°N 79.8544°E
- Construction started: 2016; 10 years ago
- Opened: 2022; 4 years ago

Technical details
- Floor count: 50
- Floor area: 1,500,000 sq ft (140,000 m^{2})

Design and construction
- Architect: P&T Group Singapore

Website
- www.capitoltwinpeaks.com

Capitol TwinPeaks is a 50-storey twin-tower mixed residential building in the Central Business District of Colombo, Sri Lanka. Its towers are connected by South Asia's highest sky bridge, and is adjacent to Beira Lake.

The building comprises over 400 apartments in two towers, and includes a fitness center, dining options, and outdoor recreational spaces.

The P&T Group Singapore and Sanken jointly developed Capitol TwinPeaks. It falls under the oversight of the Sanken Group, Sanken Construction as the contractor and Capitol Developers as the developer.

Capitol TwinPeaks received accolades at the Luxury Lifestyle Awards 2020, for architectural innovation and contribution to the real estate sector. It was also awarded the Green Certification by the Green Building Council of Sri Lanka (GBCSL).
