= Altair (building) =

Skyscraper in Colombo, Sri Lanka

- Altair two towers

- Location within Central Colombo

General information
- Status: Completed
- Type: Residential; Retail
- Architectural style: Modern
- Location: Colombo, Sri Lanka, 127 Sir James Pieris Mawatha, Colombo 00200, Colombo, Sri Lanka
- Coordinates: 06°55′08″N 79°51′16″E
- Construction started: 2012; 14 years ago
- Opened: March 2021

Height
- Architectural: 240.0 m (787 ft), 209.0 m (686 ft)

Technical details
- Floor count: 68 Vertical tower 63 Sloping tower
- Floor area: 1,500,000 sq ft (140,000 m^{2})
- Lifts/elevators: 9 high speed, 2 service

Design and construction
- Architects: Moshe Safdie in association with Design Team 3, Singapore & Sri Lanka
- Developer: South City
- Main contractor: Shapoorji Pallonji Mideast LLC

Website
- www.altair.lk

Engineering services
- Piling Works: San Piling
- Water Proofing: Finco Engineering
- Electrical, ELV & Fire Detection: Maxaire (Pvt) Ltd.

Altair is a residential and commercial development in Colombo, Sri Lanka. The building has a 68-floor vertical tower and 63 floor leaning or sloping tower. At 240.0 m (787 ft), the building is the second tallest building in Sri Lanka, and its East tower the tallest inclined building in the world. The building is situated on the banks of the Beira Lake on a 2-acre plot of land leased by the Urban Development Authority of Sri Lanka to the Developer Indocean Developers. Development was halted for five years, and then restarted in 2020. The first phase of the building opened in March 2021.

== Location ==
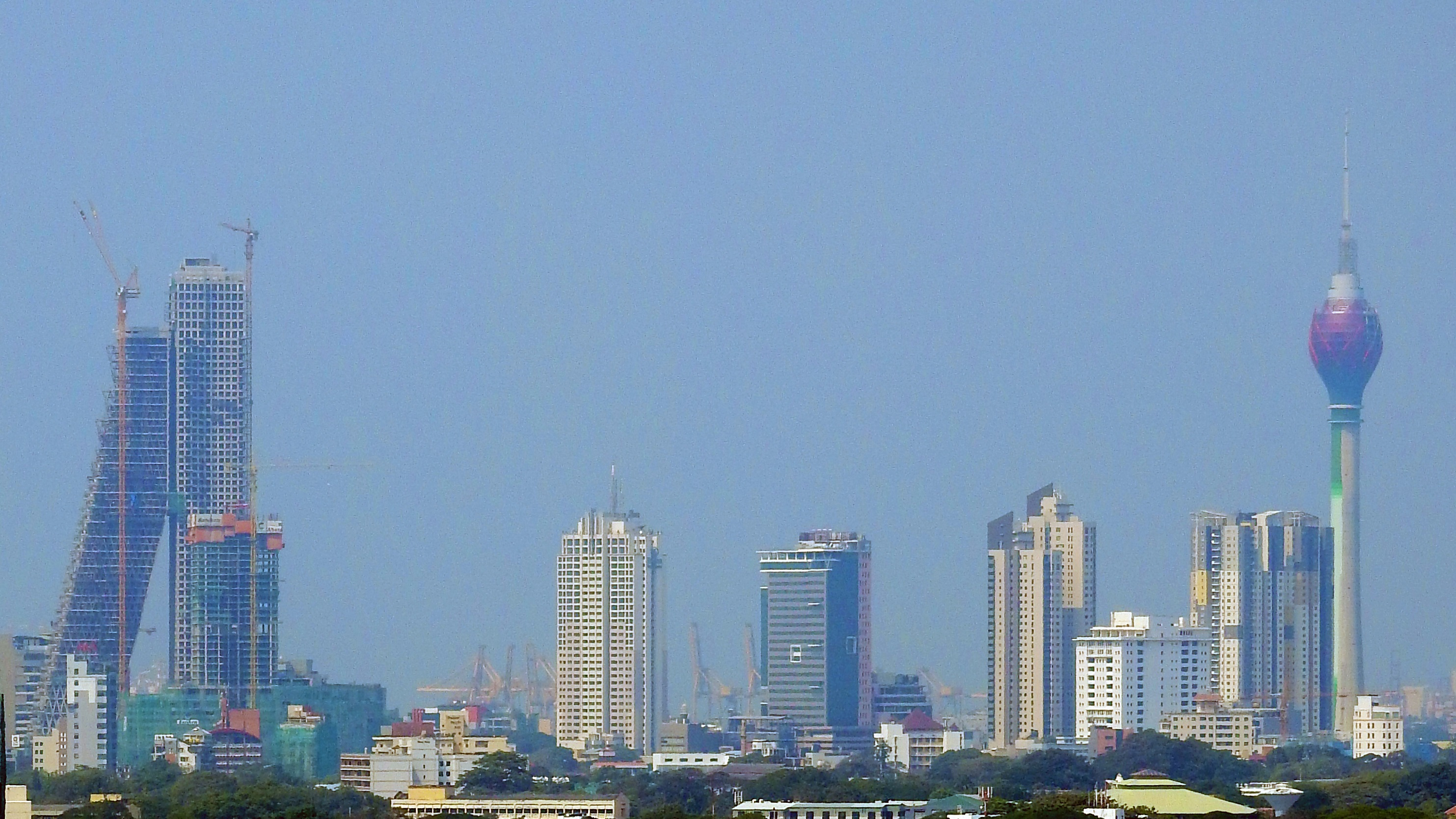
The towers under construction (far left) in November 2017.

The building is located in Colombo, in an area the Urban Development Authority plans to convert into a pedestrian-only promenade to facilitate the 40,000 sq ft (3,700 m^{2}) high-street retail component being constructed at street level. The building's podium consists of a retail podium for 2 levels of high street shopping and public plaza in front. The public plaza was created by diverting traffic away from the area, making a waterfront plaza for the city. This fully-pedestrianised plaza will allow the annual Navam Perehera to pass through and will be fronted by both high street shopping as well as public kiosks, etc.

Due to its location, the building enjoys 270-degree unobstructed views of Beira Lake and the Indian Ocean and panoramic views of the hills beyond.

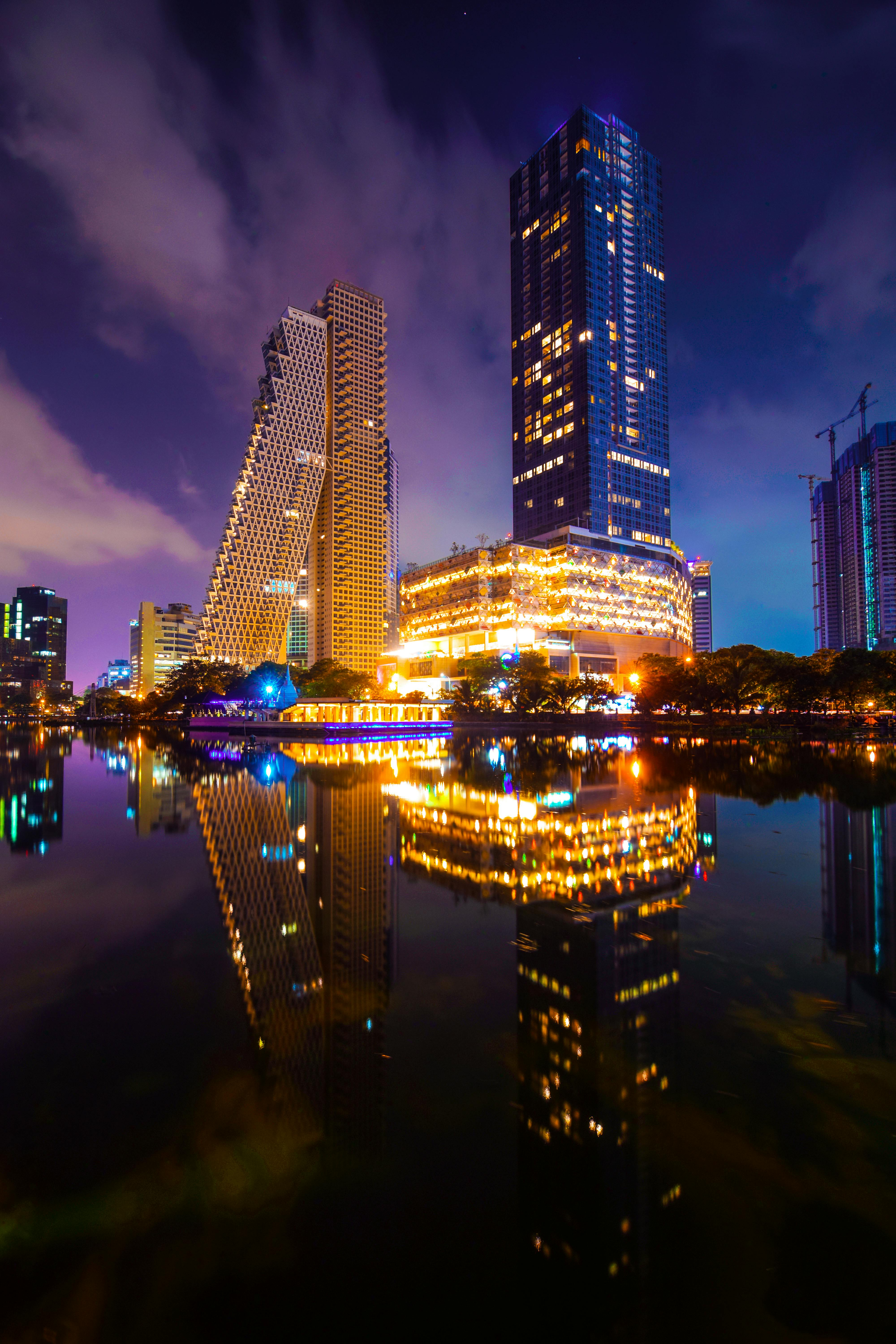
View of Altair and the Colombo City Centre from Baira Lake

== Features ==
Altair has 400 apartments ranging from 1,420 square feet (132 m^{2}) to over 5,200 square feet (480 m^{2}).

== Design and construction ==
The building is designed by Moshe Safdie of Safdie Architects, Boston, in association with Design Team 3 Singapore and Thailand as detailing and submitting architects, Derby Design Dubai as structural engineers and CKR Dubai as M & E engineers.

Altair comprises two structures: a 240 meters (790 ft) vertical tower and a 209 meters (686 ft) leaning tower. The leaning tower is inclined from level 5 to level 39 and goes vertical up to roof level at a height of 209 meters. The leaning or stepping tower has an angle of 13.8 degrees from the vertical one and leans towards the vertical tower. The two towers are connected by steel outriggers at four points at levels 39 and 41. Each tower is supported by external walls and internal core walls forming a three dimensional structured frame.

The leaning tower has been designed using a distinctive diagrid structure with flat slabs which not only adds structural stability to the building without the need for internal columns but also allows for a permeable surface with large windows. This allows maximum airflow and light which contributes to energy savings in heating and cooling and also provides access to the balcony.

The towers were constructed on reinforced concrete piles and a raft footing with a reinforced concrete or steel superstructure. Even though Colombo rarely experiences significant earthquakes, Altair has been designed to withstand earthquakes up to 7 on the Richter Scale. Colombo is classified in seismic Zone 0 under the international building code.

The developers have also commissioned wind tunnel tests in Canada where intense studies were undertaken with 103 individual wind speed sensors placed on a 2-metre model of Altair with all relevant surrounding buildings and topography within a 480 m radius.

Completion of the structural work was marked by “topping out” in December 2017. Interior work is underway and Altair was scheduled to be completed in 2019. Construction was halted for five years, and begun anew in 2020 after review of the project and resolution of some financial issues. Altair opened in March 2021.

== See also ==
- Inclined building
