= The One (Colombo) =

Mixed-use tower complex in Colombo, Sri Lanka

The One - Sri Lanka
- The One

- Location within Central Colombo
- Former names: The One Transworks Square (pvt) Ltd

General information
- Status: On-hold
- Type: Branded Hotels & Residences, Luxury Malls & Mixed Development
- Location: Transworks Square, Colombo 01, Colombo, The One Transworks Square (pvt) Ltd, No. 114, Chatham Street, Colombo 1, Fort, Sri Lanka
- Coordinates: 06°56′00″N 79°50′44″E
- Construction started: January 2017
- Completed: ?
- Cost: US$ 650 million

Height
- Height: 376 m (1,234 ft), 326 m (1,070 ft), 291 m (955 ft)

Technical details
- Floor count: 92, 80, 77
- Floor area: 4,500,000 sq ft (420,000 m^{2})

Design and construction
- Architecture firm: CCDI Group

Website
- www.rcr-colombo.lk

The One is a tri-tower US$650 million mixed-use development project in Colombo, Sri Lanka, estimated to be the 10th largest of its kind in the world. It comprises the Ritz-Carlton Residences, The JW Marriott hotel and The One Residences.

The 80-floor Ritz-Carlton Residences - Colombo, having already completed 33 floors as of August 2019, will be the first of the three buildings to be completed by December 2021. These freehold residences will be serviced and managed by Marriott International, the owning company of The Ritz-Carlton hotels. The 77-floor JW Marriott hotel building is scheduled for completion in December 2023, as well. The tower will house the country's first JW Marriott hotel. Projected to be the tallest building in South Asia upon completion in 2027, The One Residences tower will comprise 92 floors (reaching 376m in height), and offer residential, business and leisure facilities.

== Location ==
Built across 4.3 acres (1.7 ha) of Colombo Fort (Sri Lanka's business center) development is less than ten minutes away from Colombo Financial City (a part of the upcoming Colombo Port City Project), about 2 minutes from the World Trade Centre Towers, and five minutes away from the Galle Face Green esplanade.

== Transworks Square ==
The development includes a transformation of Colombo's historic Transworks Square, a 200-year-old heritage site, which will be refurbished as a mall featuring designer brands.

== See also ==
- List of tallest structures in Sri Lanka
- List of tallest buildings and structures in the Indian subcontinent
