= World Trade Center Colombo =

Multi-storey office buildings in Colombo, Sri Lanka

World Trade Center
- ලෝක වෙළෙඳ මධ්‍යස්ථානය உலக வர்த்தக மையம்

- Location within Central Colombo

General information
- Location: Colombo, Sri Lanka
- Coordinates: 06°55′57″N 79°50′38″E
- Construction started: September 1992
- Completed: 1996; 30 years ago
- Opening: 12 October 1997
- Cost: US$ 130 million (1996)
- Owner: Overseas Realty Ceylon PLC
- Operator: Overseas Realty Ceylon PLC

Height
- Roof: 152 m (499 ft)

Technical details
- Floor count: 43
- Floor area: 70,000 m^{2} (750,000 ft^{2})

Design and construction
- Architect: Anthony NG Architects
- Developer: Overseas Realty Ceylon PLC
- Main contractor: Turner Steiner East Asia Ltd

Website
- wtc.lk

The World Trade Center (also known as WTC Colombo or WTCC) (Sinhala: ලෝක වෙළෙඳ මධ්‍යස්ථානය, romanized: Lōka Veḷen̆da Madhyasthānaya; Tamil: உலக வர்த்தக மையம், romanized: Ulaka Varttaka Maiyam) is a 152-metre-tall (499 ft) twin building in Colombo, Sri Lanka. The 39-storey towers are built over a 4-storey retail podium, and thus each tower has a total floor count of 43. WTCC is owned and managed by Overseas Realty Ceylon PLC (ORCPLC).

== History ==
The WTCC was the vision of Shing Pee Tao, a Singaporean commodities, shipping and real estate company. Tao acquired ORCPLC, a listed company on the Colombo Stock Exchange, which owned the undeveloped site at Echelon Square, Colombo. Formal planning approval was granted in January 1992 and groundbreaking took place in September.

The building was constructed using pre-fabricated pre-cast concrete panels for the outer walls, columns and beam structures. The panels were bolted to each other and to the concrete floor to become poise facade of the building. Loads were also designed to be carried by a column-beam structure and the core walls were the lifts, toilets and fire staircase located in the centre of the building.

The building which was under construction, was damaged in January 1996 as a result of LTTE suicide attack on the Central Bank, which killed 91 people and injured over 1,400.

The WTCC was officially opened on 12 October 1997 by President Chandrika Kumaratunga. On Wednesday, 15 October (three days after the opening), the Liberation Tigers of Tamil Eelam (LTTE) detonated a truck laden with explosives in the adjoining hotel car park, causing significant damage to the side of the western tower. The structure however remained intact due to its construction using cellate high-strength precast panels. The attack was modelled on the 1993 World Trade Center bombing in New York City. The WTCC was specifically targeted by the LTTE as it was the country's tallest building and the symbolic centre of its economy. A full restoration of the building was completed in approximately six months and the building was re-commissioned in June 1998.

Current tenants include the Colombo Stock Exchange, Securities Exchange Commission, Asian Broadcasting Corporation (Hiru TV and various radio stations including GOLD FM) and the Board of Investment of Sri Lanka.

== See also ==
Ground-level view of World Trade Center Colombo

- List of twin buildings and structures
- List of world trade centers
- 1997 Colombo World Trade Centre bombing
