= Achilleion, Colombo =

Residential complex in Colombo, Sri Lanka

Achilleion

General information
- Status: Under construction
- Location: Bambalapitiya, Colombo, Sri Lanka
- Coordinates: 06°53′35″N 79°51′15″E
- Cost: Rs. 2.3 billion (land only)

Technical details
- Floor count: 50

Website
- achilleion.lk

Achilleion is a proposed residential complex in Colombo, Sri Lanka. Upon completion, the complex is planned to consist of two twin skyscrapers of 50 floors each, connected by two skybridges; one at the centre of the towers and the other at the top, functioning as a helipad. The 2016 land value on which the Achilleion towers will be built is Rs. 2.3 billion (US$ 15.7 million).

Currently, a Rs. 300 million (US$ 2 million) show apartment is built at the site, 100 ft (30 m) above sea level. It is claimed to be the tallest stand-alone show apartment in the world. Construction of the buildings commenced in January 2017.

== See also ==
- List of tallest structures in Sri Lanka
