= Kokavil =

Kokavil கொக்காவில் කොකාවිල්)
- Village
- Location within Northern Province
- Coordinates: 9°16′0″N 80°24′0″E
- Country: Sri Lanka
- Province: Northern
- District: Mullaitivu
- DS Division: Oddusuddan

Kokavil (Tamil: கொக்காவில் Sinhala: කොකාවිල්) is a village in Mullaitivu District, Sri Lanka, also called Kokkavil. It is situated along the A-9 road.

== History ==
=== Massacre on Yal Devi ===
Troops were located parallel to the A-9 highway and the old Murikandi-Kokavil Railway Station where the Liberation Tigers of Tamil Eelam (LTTE) massacre on the "Yal Devi" passenger train occurred. On 19 January 1985, the packed Yal Devi train was attacked by members of the LTTE, triggering a landmine. 28 soldiers and 11 civilians were killed, and 20 soldiers, five civilians and three police officers were injured. The train driver pushed all the injured into the carriage connected to the diesel locomotive and continued the journey, leaving the other 12 compartments behind, as the train remained disconnected as a result of the impact of the blast. All casualties were delivered to the nearest hospital at the next railway station.

=== Military history ===
On 11 July 1990 the Sri Lankan Army lost the Kokavil army camp, which guarded the Rupavahini relay tower. Captain Saliya Upul Aladeniya was posthumously awarded the "Parama Weera Vibhushanaya" (PWV) Medal for valour during the fight, for defending the camp without reinforcements against the LTTE until the camp fell. He had received orders to abandon the camp, but refused to do so as the majority of his troops were injured and bullets were running low. He was the first to be posthumously nominated for the PWV.

The Sri Lanka Army recaptured Kokavil on December 1, 2008, as part of the Eelam War IV.
