= Terrorism in Sri Lanka =

Terrorism in Sri Lanka has been a highly destructive phenomenon during the 20th and 21st centuries, especially so during the periods of the Sri Lankan Civil War (1983–2009) and the first (1971) and second JVP insurrections (1987–1989). A common definition of terrorism is the systematic or threatened use of violence to intimidate a population or government for political, religious, or ideological goals. Sri Lanka is a country that has experienced some of the worst known acts of modern terrorism, such as suicide bombings, massacres of civilians and assassination of political and social leaders. Terrorism has posed a significant threat to the society, economy and development of the country. The Prevention of Terrorism Act of 1978 is the legislation that provides the powers to law enforcement officers to deal with issues related to terrorism in Sri Lanka. It was first enacted as a temporary law in 1979 under the presidency of J. R. Jayewardene, and later made permanent in 1982.

Terrorism found in Sri Lanka can be mainly categorized into three forms: ethno-nationalist terrorism, far-left terrorism and state terrorism. The Liberation Tigers of Tamil Eelam (LTTE) and Janatha Vimukthi Peramuna (JVP) are two of the most prominent and most deadly terrorist groups in Sri Lankan history. The LTTE, also known as Tamil Tigers, was a Sri Lankan Tamil militant group which waged an armed struggle against the Sri Lankan government and the Sinhalese ethnic majority with the aim of establishing an independent Tamil ethnostate. This campaign led to the Sri Lankan Civil War, which ran from 1983 until 2009, when the LTTE was decisively defeated by the Sri Lanka Armed Forces. The Janatha Vimukthi Peramuna is a Marxist–Leninist communist party, which was involved in two armed uprisings against the ruling governments in 1971 (SLFP) and 1987–89 (UNP). After the two unsuccessful insurrections, the JVP joined democratic politics in 1994.

In 2026, the Sri Lankan Cabinet approved the "Safeguarding the State from Terrorism" Bill to replace the erstwhile Prevention of Terrorism Act.

== History and origins ==
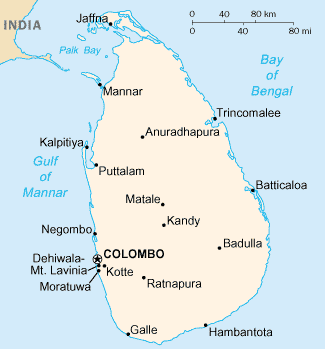
Main cities in Sri Lanka.

=== JVP insurrections ===
The leftist Janatha Vimukthi Peramuna drew worldwide attention to Sri Lanka, when it launched an insurrection against the Bandaranaike government in April 1971. Although the insurgents were young, poorly armed, and inadequately trained, they succeeded in seizing and holding major areas in Southern and Central provinces before they were defeated by the security forces. Their attempt to seize power created a major crisis for the government and forced a fundamental reassessment of the nation's security needs. The conflict saw a limited usage of weapons and tactics from both sides. The JVP had prepared for the insurrection in the years leading up to it gathering weapons and ammunition, though they had limited access to modern weapons.

The government reacted to the JVP's insurrection by launching a brutal crackdown which resulted in the killing, in a period of just five weeks, of up to 20,000 young people suspected of being JVP members. According to another source, the official death toll was about 1,200 but unofficial figures reliably estimated it to be around four to five thousand. JVP became the first organization to be proscribed in Sri Lanka in 1971, after their revolt. The government forces were ill-equipped to deal with a full-scale insurrection with world war two vintage British weapons. Although the major danger disappeared after three weeks, it took nearly three more months to completely eradicate the rebellion outposts in the jungles and remote villages.

The JVP was proscribed once again, after July 1983 disturbances amidst government allegations that they have been involved in plots to destabilize the country and overthrow the government. This led to the second insurrection of JVP. The second insurrection was not an open revolt, like the 1971 insurrection but appeared to be a low intensity conflict that lasted from 1987 to 1989 with the JVP resorting to assassinations, subversion, raids and attacks on military and civilian targets. The JVP's military wing Deshapremi Janatha Vyaparaya (Patriotic People's Movement aka DJV) was more active in terrorist activities in the second insurrection. During the second insurrection DJV gave priority to the killing of civilians, be it political rivals or simple citizens who disobeyed the innumerable orders of JVP.

The UNP government cracked down on the JVP's insurrection using brutal force, killing tens of thousands of students and other civilians suspected of being JVP sympathisers. According to some sources over 60,000 persons were killed during this insurrection, others sources suggests that the number of killed and made to disappear by killer squads is altogether not more than 35,000. The total number of victims included those of the DJV, the military wing of JVP and as well as those killed in retaliation by the government's official armed groups and other killer squads. Throughout this insurrection many state and private property were also destroyed. The second insurrection of JVP came to and end, when JVP's key leaders such as Rohana Wijeweera, Upatissa Gamanayake and Saman Piyasiri Fernando were assassinated by the end of 1989.

=== Sri Lankan Civil War ===
The government forces of Sri Lanka were involved in an armed conflict with the Liberation Tigers of Tamil Eelam (LTTE), a militant organisation which fought to create an independent Tamil state in the northern and eastern provinces of the island. Beginning from 1983, the war has lasted nearly three decades and was one of the longest-running civil wars in Asia. After a 26-year long military campaign, the Sri Lankan military defeated the Tamil Tigers in May 2009, bringing the civil war to an end. There are widespread allegations that the Sri Lankan military and the LTTE committed numerous atrocities and human rights violations, including war crimes, during the civil war. A United Nations report found that as many as 40,000 civilians may have been killed in the final months of the civil war, mostly as a result of indiscriminate shelling by the Sri Lankan military. The report also found that the Sri Lankan military/government shelled hospitals and humanitarian objects; denied humanitarian assistance; violated the human rights of civilians and LTTE combatants; and it violated the human rights of those outside the conflict zone such as the media. The report concluded that the "conduct of the war represented a grave assault on the entire regime of international law designed to protect individual dignity during both war and peace". During the final phases of the war, the LTTE used Tamil civilians as Human shields to protect fleeing cadres, which accounted for dramatic increase of casualties in the last months of the conflict. The LTTE is also accused for attacking the Tamil civilians who fled their diminishing control areas during the final phases of the war. The Office of the United Nations High Commissioner for Human Rights is currently investigating the alleged war crimes.

For over 25 years, the war caused significant hardships to the population, environment and the economy of the country, with at least 100,000 people killed during its course. The tactics employed by the Liberation Tigers of Tamil Eelam during the war and specially, their attacks to civilian targets, use of child soldiers and suicide bombings resulted in them listing as a terrorist organization in 32 countries, including the United States, India, Canada and the member nations of the European Union. The LTTE was proscribed for the first time in Sri Lanka in 1998, after their attack to the temple of the tooth, a highly sacred Buddhist shrine and a UNESCO world heritage site. The police and home guards retaliated for the Temple of the Tooth attack by massacring eight Tamil civilians in Tampalakamam on 3 February 1998. Later the LTTE was proscribed again in 2009. In May 2009, Sri Lankan government formally declared an end to the 25-year civil war after the army took control of the entire island and the death of the founding leader of the Tamil Tigers, Velupillai Prabhakaran.

=== Islamic terrorism ===
The National Thowheeth Jama'ath is a local militant Islamist group with suspected ties to the Islamic State. The group is most notable for orchestrating the 2019 Sri Lanka Easter bombings on 21 April 2019 (Easter Sunday), when NTJ suicide bombers attacked three Catholic churches in Colombo, Negombo, and Batticaloa and three luxury hotels in Colombo. 269 people were killed, including at least 45 foreigners, and over 500 more were injured. On 27 April 2019, Sri Lankan security forces and militants from National Thowheeth Jama'ath clashed after the security forces raided a safe house of the militants. Sixteen people, including six children, died during the raid, and two more were injured, as three cornered suicide bombers blew themselves up.

The group was also involved in the brutal murder of two police officers Ganesh Dinesh and Niroshan Indika in 2018, which at the time was wrongfully blamed on a former LTTE cadre.

== Terrorist attacks ==
A number of terrorists attacks have occurred in Sri Lanka, specially during the periods of civil war (1983–2009) and the JVP insurrections (1971 and 1987–1989). According to independent sources Sri Lanka was subjected to some of the worst terrorist attacks that have occurred worldwide with 100 or more fatalities over the last 100 years. The deadliest terrorist attacks with over 100 deaths that have happened in Sri Lanka, includes Sri Maha Bodhi attack, Aluth Oya massacre, Colombo Central Bus Station bombing, Kattankudy mosque massacre, Palliyagodella massacre and Digampathana bombing. The Colombo Central Bank bombing had the highest number of civilian casualties and the greatest amount of explosive force (over 400 kg) deployed against a civilian target, over the various LTTE attacks that occurred during the civil war. The attack killed over 90 people and injured 1,400 others. The perpetrators of all these deadliest terrorist attacks in Sri Lanka was LTTE. In addition to the deadly bomb attacks, the LTTE attacked the Sinhalese and Muslim villages and was also involved in massacres of civilians as a part of their campaign to control territory.

According to the FBI, LTTE was a militant group that has perfected the use of suicide bombings, invented the suicide belt and pioneered the use of women in suicide attacks. The FBI also claim they were the first group to assassinate two world leaders. Since the late 1980s, the group has conducted approximately two hundred suicide attacks. Targets have included transit hubs, shrines, and office buildings. Beyond suicide bombings, the LTTE has used conventional bombs and Claymore mines to attack political and civilian targets, and has gunned down both Sri Lankan officials and civilians.

The attacks of JVP and its military wing DJV during the second JVP insurrection were not as deadly as some of the attacks of LTTE, but occurred in a higher frequency in many parts of the country. Some of the notable attacks of JVP/DJV includes 1987 grenade attack in the Sri Lankan Parliament, 1989 Temple of the Tooth attack and Bomb attack to the Kataragama Esala procession in July 1989. In addition to the assassinations of political rivals and other who opposed Marxists principles, the JVP/DJV were also involved in many attacks to the public and private property such as burning of public transport vehicles, blasting transformers and destroying utilities etc.

The 2019 Sri Lanka Easter bombings were the first acts of terrorism that occurred after the end of the civil war in 2009. Eight explosions took place on Easter Sunday 21 April 2019 at three catholic churches located in Colombo, Negombo and Batticaloa (St. Anthony's Shrine, St. Sebastian's Church, and Zion Church) and three luxury hotels in the commercial capital Colombo (Shangri-La Hotel, Cinnamon Grand Hotel, and Kingsbury Hotel). 269 people were killed, including at least 45 foreigners, and over 500 more were injured. A local Islamist terrorist group known as National Thowheeth Jama'ath was identified as responsible for these string of attacks.

== Counter-terrorism ==
The Special Task Force (STF) is an elite special forces unit of the Sri Lanka Police Service specializing in counter-terrorism and counter-insurgency operations. It was formed in 1983 not as a military force but rather as a highly specialised police unit. Today it has developed into a major security arm of the state involved in VIP security, protecting sensitive terrorist targets and suppressing activities which pose a threat to national security. On June 7 Three suspects have been arrested with a haul of state-of-the-art telecommunication equipment including high-tech mobile phones during a raid of a house at Eththukala in Negombo in Western provinceon June 7, reports Colombo Page. Police Spokesman Superintendent Police(SP) Ruwan Gunasekara said that 402 iPhones, 17,400 SIM cards, 60 routers and three laptops were among the items that were seized. One of the three suspects arrested is a Chinese national while the other two are residents of Negombo and Kalpitiya. Other arreste related to the Sri Lanka Easter bombings reported when the STF Police arrested a terrorist belonging to the National Thowheed Jamaath (NTJ), Anzar Mohamed Rinaz, while he was trying to flee the country at the Bandaranaike International Airport Negombo located in Colombo on July 3, reports The Island. Security sources revealed that Rinaz had undergone training at NTJ facility in Nuwara Eliya of Central Province.

== State terrorism ==
The Sri Lankan government has been accused of sponsoring and aiding terrorism against the country's population during the later part of the 20th century. The government and the Armed Forces have been accused of attacks on civilians, indiscriminate shelling and bombing, extrajudicial killings, rape, torture, disappearance, arbitrary detention, forced displacement and economic blockade. According to Amnesty International Sri Lanka's laws, government and society facilitated these accusations.

== Proscribed organizations ==
The following organisations have been banned by the government of Sri Lanka at some point in time. Some have also been banned by foreign governments.

Former

- Illankai Tamil Arasu Kachchi (ITAK) – (27 May 1958 – 27 October 1958)
- Jathika Vimukthi Peramuna (JVP) / National Liberation Front (NLF) – (27 May 1958 – 27 October 1958)
- Janatha Vimukthi Peramuna (JVP) / People's Liberation Front (PLF) – (April 1971 – 1977, 30 July 1983 – 10 May 1988)
- Ceylon Communist Party (Moscow Wing) (CCP(M)) – (July 1983 – ~1983)
- Nava Sama Samaja Party (NSSP) – (July 1983 – ~1985)
- Socialist Students Union (Sri Lanka) (SSS) – (May 1987 – ?)
- Patriotic Students Union (DSS) – (January 1988 – ?)
- Tamil National Council (TNC) – (25 February 2014 – 20 November 2015)

Current

- Liberation Tigers of Tamil Eelam (LTTE) – (from 19 January 1998 – 4 September 2002, since 7 January 2009)
- Headquarters Group – (since 25 February 2014)
- Tamil Coordinating Committee (TCC) – (since 25 February 2014)
- Tamil Eelam Peoples Assembly (TEPA) – (since 25 February 2014)
- Tamils Rehabilitation Organisation (TRO) – (since 25 February 2014)
- Transnational Government of Tamil Eelam (TGTE) – (since 25 February 2014)
- World Tamil Movement (WTM) – (since 25 February 2014)
- World Tamil Relief Fund (WTRF) – (since 25 February 2014)
- National Thowheeth Jama'ath (NTJ) – (since 27 April 2019)
- Jamaathe Millaathe Ibrahim (JMI) – (since 13 May 2019)
- Willayath As Seylani (WAS) – (since 13 May 2019)
- Global Tamil Forum (GTF) – (since 25 February 2021)
- British Tamils Forum (BTF) – (since 25 February 2021)
- Tamil Youth Organisation (TYO) – (since 25 February 2021)
- Canadian Tamil Congress (CTC) – (since 25 February 2021)
- Australian Tamil Congress (ATC) – (since 25 February 2021)
- National Council of Canadian Tamils (NCCT) – (since 25 February 2021)
- World Tamil Coordinating Committee (WTCC) – (since 25 February 2021)

== See also ==
- Organized crime
- Casualty recording
