= Sainthamaruthu shootout =

Attacks and suicide bombing

- Part of the aftermath of the 2019 Sri Lanka Easter bombings, the terrorism in Sri Lanka, and the terrorism linked to ISIL
- Sainthamaruthu shootout (Sri Lanka)
Date	26 April 2019 (7 years ago)
Location	Sainthamaruthu, Ampara District, Eastern Province, Sri Lanka 7°23′38″N 81°50′2″E
Result	Sri Lankan government victory

Belligerents
Sri Lanka	Islamic State

Commanders and leaders
(Sri Lanka) Maithripala Sirisena (Sri Lanka) Mahesh Senanayake	Mohamed Hashim †; Rilwan Hashim †; Zainee Hashim †

Units involved
Sri Lanka Police: Special Task Force; Sri Lankan Army	National Thowheeth Jama'ath

Strength
Unknown	17

Casualties and losses
none 17 killed (ISIS claim;exaggerated)	15 killed 2 injured
- 10 civilian killed (6 children)

On 26 April 2019, Sri Lankan security forces and National Thowheeth Jama'ath militants linked to the Islamic State of Iraq and the Levant (ISIL) clashed when the security forces raided a house in the town of Sainthamaruthu in Ampara District at around 7:30 pm. The house had been used by the militants, including family members of Zahran Hashim, mastermind of the 2019 Sri Lanka Easter bombings, to manufacture explosives and suicide vests. Three suicide bombers blew themselves up, killing nine of their family members, including six children, while four other suspects were shot dead by the soldiers. A civilian was killed and two others were injured during the crossfire.

== Background ==
Following the 2019 Sri Lanka Easter bombings, the Sri Lankan government initiated an operation to locate suspected ISIL-loyal National Thowheeth Jama'ath terrorists. Special Task Force received a tip from a traffic police officer about a house in Sainthamaruthu with a group of suspicious people. The Special Task Force went onto raid the house under suspicion. The ISIL-aligned Amaq News Agency later claimed that the National Thowheeth Jama'ath militants of Sainthamaruthu had prepared an ambush at the house, and had voluntarily lured the security forces into attacking them.

== Attacks ==
When the Special Task Force tried to enter the house shots were fired from inside. The security forces exchanged fire with those inside the house for about an hour. Three suicide bombers blew themselves up killing 9 people, while police confirmed three other suspects were killed in the engagement.

Three women and six children were killed in the suicide bombings by the terrorists. A civilian was killed in crossfire. Zahran Hashim's wife and daughter were injured in the shootout.

Those killed in the raid were identified as bombing instigator Zahran Hashim's father Mohamed Hashim and his brothers Zainee and Rilwan, with Rilwan being one of the suicide bombers. The Amaq News Agency released a statement claiming that the militants at Sainthamaruthu had been loyal to ISIL, and that they had managed to kill 17 Sri Lankan security forces. It also published a photo of Zahran alongside his brother Rilwan. The family released a final video message before being killed, which suggested that they had indeed been linked to ISIL.

== Aftermath ==
Fifteen bodies were initially recovered from the site of the clash. Security troops also recovered explosives, detonators, gelignite sticks, acid bottles, detonating cords, ISIL flags, suicide kits, and military uniforms. A woman and a child injured at a nearby house during the explosions were taken to the hospital and received police custody, suspected to be the wife and daughter of Zahran.

A curfew was imposed in the area till further notice.

The bodies of 10 adults were buried without religious rites on 2 May but the 6 children were buried with Islamic funeral rites. However, the bodies were exhumed on June to collect DNA samples as the previous samples were too contaminated.

The Sri Lankan Police awarded රු.500,000 ($2514) to the police officer who tipped off the Special Task Force about the safe house in Sainthamaruthu. Three Muslim citizens in the area who tipped off the police about the suspects were given රු.1 million ($5028) each.
