= Pujith Jayasundara =

Sri Lankan police officer and 34th Inspector General of Police

- පූජිත් ජයසුන්දර

34th Inspector General of Police (Sri Lanka)
- In office 20 April 2016 – 15 March 2020
- Preceded by: Nugagaha Kapalle Illangakoon
- Succeeded by: C. D. Wickramaratne

Personal details
- Born: Pujith Senadhi Bandara Jayasundara; 15 March 1960 (age 66) Kurunegala, Sri Lanka
- Profession: Police officer
- Criminal information
- Status: Incarcerated
- Convictions: Guilty of criminal negligence, dereliction of official duty on 2019 Sri Lanka Easter bombings
- Penalty: Death penalty

Pujith Senadhi Bandara Jayasundara (Sinhala: පූජිත් සේනාධි බණ්ඩාර ජයසුන්දර) also simply known as Pujith Jayasundara (Sinhala: පූජිත් ජයසුන්දර), born 15 March 1960, is a former Sri Lankan police officer. He was the 34th Inspector-General of Police (IGP) from 2016 until 2020, when he was forced to resign his post for failing to prevent the Easter bombings, for which he had been on compulsory leave since 2019. He was subsequently indicted and sentenced to death on charges of criminal negligence for failing to act on intelligence warning him of the bombings.

== Early life and education ==
Jayasundara was born 15 March 1960 in Kurunegala. He is the son of Ranbandara Jayasundara, who worked for an electronics and radio appliance manufacturing company in Colombo. He received his primary education at Thaksala Maha Vidyalaya in Mahamukalanyaya in Bogamuwa. At grade five, he was admitted to Ibbagamuwa Central School and then joined Dharmaraja College in Kandy in 1969 soon after. He graduated from University of Sri Jayewardenepura with a Bachelor of Commerce with a class of second upper.

== Police career ==
He joined the Sri Lanka Police in 1985 as a Probationary Assistant Superintendent of Police. He worked as a Senior Deputy Inspector General of Sri Lanka Police prior to his appointment as the IGP. He served as a police officer for 35 years until his retirement in 2020.

Jayasundara was appointed on 20 April 2016, recommended by the newly appointed Constitutional Council of Sri Lanka. He was chosen from among three Senior Deputy Inspectors General of Police. The Constitutional Council approved his appointment. He was expected to prosecute cases against former President of Sri Lanka, Mahinda Rajapakse and his allies.

=== Easter bombings ===
On 26 April 2019 President Maithripala Sirisena ordered Jayasundara to resign over failures that led to the deadly Easter bomb attacks, which killed 269 people. Due to a lack of response from Jayasundara, he was put on compulsory leave with Senior DIG C. D. Wickramaratne appointed the acting Inspector General.

However in a 20-page complaint Jayasundara claimed that there were serious communication gaps between intelligence agencies and security arms of the government, all which fall under Sirisena. He also stated that the State Intelligence Service (SIS) which reports directly to the president ordered him to stop ongoing police investigations into Islamic militants including the National Thowheeth Jama'ath (NTJ).

Jayasundara who was arrested along with Hemasiri Fernando, Secretary to the Ministry of Defence for failing prevent the Easter bombings. In February 2020, he was released on a cash bail of Rs 250,000. In March 2020, he retired from the police service and was approved to obtain his pension and retirement benefits.

== Conviction ==
On 31 July 2026, the Colombo Permanent High Court Trial-at-Bar convicted Jayasundara by a majority decision on 854 of 855 charges relating to his failure to act on intelligence warnings received before the Easter Sunday bombings. The court found him guilty of criminal negligence, dereliction of official duty, and aiding and abetting deaths by failing to take preventive action despite advance warnings of planned attacks on churches and hotels. He was sentenced to death.

The verdict followed a Supreme Court ruling that overturned his 2022 acquittal and ordered the Trial-at-Bar to continue. During the judgment, the court held that Jayasundara had received intelligence on 20 April 2019 warning of imminent suicide attacks but failed to take adequate preventive measures, amounting to a serious breach of his responsibilities as the country's chief law enforcement officer. One member of the three-judge bench dissented, finding that the prosecution had not proved the charges beyond a reasonable doubt.

Jayasundara was jointly indicted with former permanent secretary to the Ministry of Defence, Hemasiri Fernando on charges arising from their alleged failure to act on intelligence warning of the attacks. The charges arose from the Easter Sunday terrorist attacks of 21 April 2019, in which coordinated suicide bombings targeted churches and luxury hotels across Sri Lanka, killing more than 260 people and injuring hundreds. The attacks remain among the deadliest terrorist incidents in Sri Lanka's history.

== Notes ==
Police appointments
Preceded by Nugagaha Kapalle Illangakoon	Sri Lankan Inspector General of Police; 2016–2019	Succeeded by C. D. Wickramaratne
