= Derelict =

Derelict may refer to:

== Law ==
- Derelict, property that has been abandoned or deserted
  - Derelict (maritime), property which has been abandoned and deserted at sea without any hope of recovery

== Arts, entertainment, and media ==
=== Music ===
- "Dead Man's Chest", a song also known as "Derelict" or "Fifteen Men on the Dead Man's Chest"
- "Derelict", a song from the 1996 album Odelay by Beck
- "Derelict", a song from the 2017 album Look at Yourself by Emmure
- "Derelict", a song from the 2008 album Fallen Sanctuary by Serenity
- Derelicts, a 2017 album from "Carbon Based Lifeforms"
- "The Derelict", a song from the 2009 album Æther Shanties by Abney Park
- "The Derelict", a song from the 1973 album Penguin by Fleetwood Mac
- "The Derelict (God Forsaken)", a song from the 2009 album We the Fallen by Psyclon Nine
- The Derelicts, a 1970s British R&B band
- "Derelict", a song recorded by the American quintet Bounding Main for their 2005 album Maiden Voyage

=== Other uses in arts, entertainment, and media ===
- Derelict (film), a 1930 American adventure film directed by Rowland V. Lee
- "The Derelict" (LIS episode), a first-season episode of the TV series Lost in Space
- "The Derelict" (short story), a 1912 short story by William Hope Hodgson
- The Derelict, a spaceship of extraterrestrial origin in the film Alien (1979)

== Other uses ==
- Icon Derelict, a one-off hot-rod classic vehicle based on the Chrysler Town & Country (1941–1988)

== See also ==
- Dereliction of duty (disambiguation)
