= Zahran Hashim =

Sri Lankan Islamist militant (1988–2019)

- සහ්රාන් හාෂිම්
- Born: 1985; Kattankudy, Sri Lanka
- Died: 21 April 2019 (aged 33); Colombo, Sri Lanka
- Cause of death: Suicide bombing
- Known for: Mastermind of the 2019 Sri Lanka Easter bombings
- Children: 2

Mohamed Hashim Mohamed Zahran (සහ්රාන් හාෂිම්; 1985 – 21 April 2019), known as Zahran Hashim or Hashem, was a Sri Lankan Islamist militant and the founder of the National Thowheeth Jama'ath (NTJ). He was identified by Sri Lankan authorities as well as international intelligence bodies as the mastermind behind the 2019 Sri Lanka Easter bombings, a series of coordinated suicide attacks on churches and hotels that killed 269 people and injured approximately 500. He was one of the two suicide bombers in the Shangri-La Hotel, one of the attack's target.

== Early life and education ==
Mohamed Hashim Mohamed Zahran was born in Kattankudy, a small seaside town in eastern Sri Lanka, one of four children. His family was poor; his father sold packets of food on the street, and was reputed to be a petty thief.

Hashim attended Jamiathul Falah Arabic College in Colombo, but was expelled in 2005 as he believed that the school was teaching a version of Islam that was too moderate.

== Radical preaching ==
Hashim joined the Dharul Athar mosque in 2006, and was on its management committee for three years before they had a disagreement. The committee banned him from preaching for three months in 2009.

In 2012, he founded a mosque of his own. He began engaging in extremism in 2013, although only started preaching violent extremism in 2016. He began releasing online videos preaching radical Islam, calling for jihad and threatening bloodshed.

Hashim founded a hardline Islamist group, National Thowheeth Jama'ath (NTJ), a militant splinter group of another group, the Sri Lanka Thowheed Jamath. (According to the BBC, he may have been expelled from the NTJ owing to making hate speeches, and it is possible that he founded yet another group.)

== 2019 Easter bombings and death ==
Hashim led a local militant group that pledged allegiance to the Islamic State (ISIS). On 21 April 2019, the group carried out coordinated suicide bombings on churches and hotels on Easter Sunday, with Hashim named as the primary planner of the attacks. The attacks targeted three churches and three luxury hotels in Colombo, Negombo, and Batticaloa.

Hashim himself was one of the suicide bombers alongside Ilham Ahmed Mohamed Ibrahim, detonating explosives at the Shangri-La Hotel in Colombo on the morning of the attacks. While Ilham bombed the Shangri-La Hotel alongside Hashim, his brother Inshaf Ahmed Ibrahim detonated explosives nearby at the Cinnamon Grand Hotel.

Apart from the 9 attackers, 269 people were killed in the attacks, and more than 500 were injured. Three days after the bombings, Amaq News Agency, the propaganda arm of ISIS released a video in which Hashim appeared alongside the other attackers, pledging allegiance to the Islamic State’s leader, Abu Bakr al-Baghdadi. Hashim, whose face was uncovered, led the oath while the others stood behind him. During the video, Hashim claimed that the attacks were carried out in revenge for the Christchurch mosque shootings.

On 26 April 2019, there was a shootout at a "safe house" in Sainthamaruthu in Ampara District on the east coast, in which at least 15 people, three of whom wore suicide vests, including 6 children, were shot dead, and Hashim's wife and daughter were wounded.

On the same day, during a security forces raid on a safe house in the Colombo suburb of Dematagoda, His several associates detonated suicide vests, killing themselves. His identity was later confirmed through DNA testing.

== Personal life ==
Aged 23, Hashim married a 14-year-old girl from a small town near Colombo took her to his home town of Kattankudy. They had a daughter.

His sister, Mohamed Hashim Mathaniya, was involved in assisting law enforcement after the bombing.
