= Asanga Abeyagoonasekera =

Sri Lankan politician (born 1977)

- අසංග අබේගුණසේකර
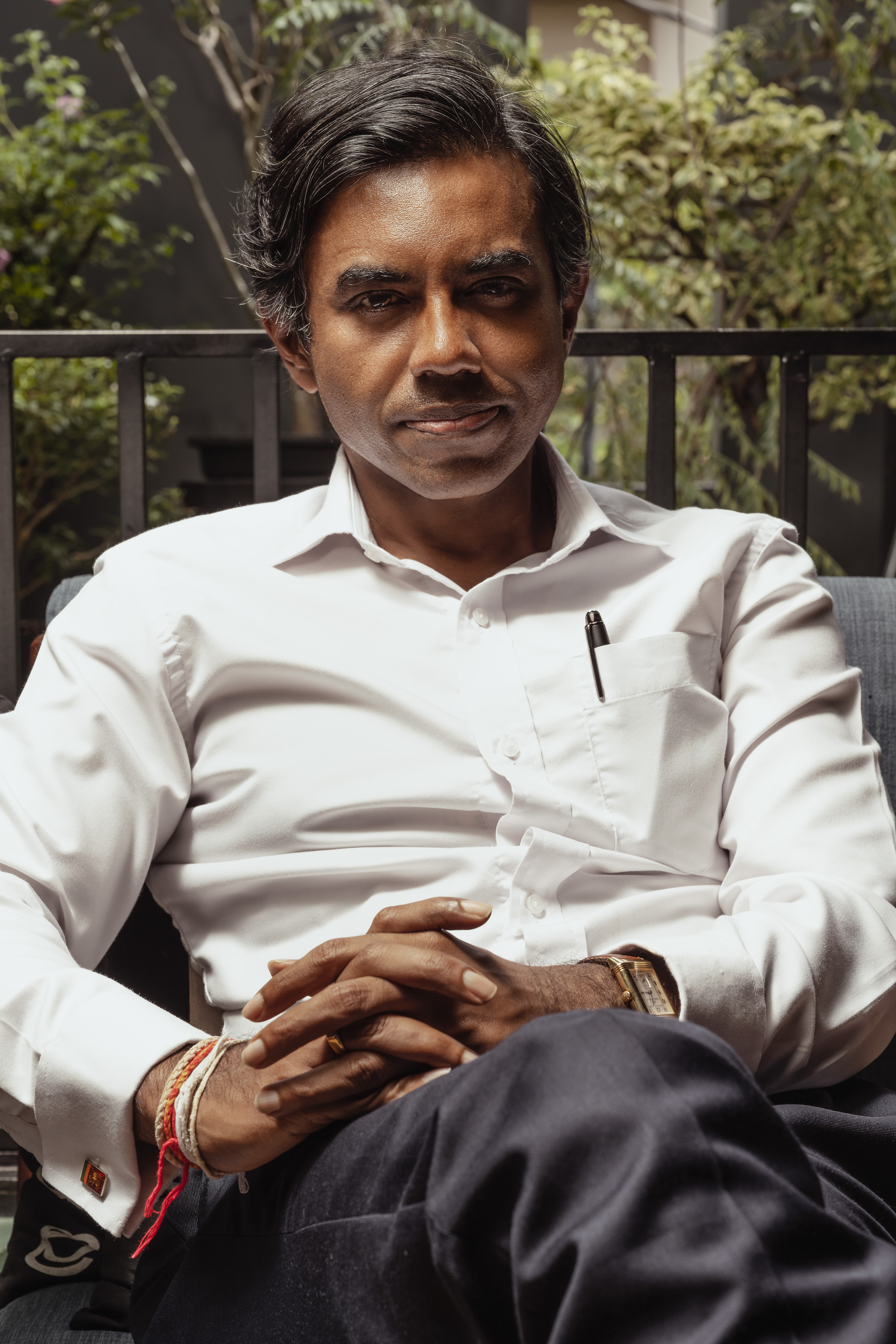
- Asanga Abeyagoonasekera 2025
- Born: 21 August 1977 (age 49); Colombo, Sri Lanka
- Education: Ananda College; Harvard Kennedy School; Edith Cowan University
- Spouse: Kumudu
- Website: Official website

Asanga Abeyagoonasekera (Sinhala: අසංග අබේගුණසේකර; born 21 August 1977) is a Sri Lankan academic, geopolitics and foreign policy analyst. He is the present executive director of the South Asia Foresight Network (SAFN) and a Senior Fellow at the Millennium Project in Washington DC since 2021. He is a technical advisor to International Monetary Fund(IMF) contributed to 'Sri Lanka: Technical Assistance Report-Governance Diagnostic Assessment' published in 2023. He is a political columnist and author. He is a visiting professor for geopolitics and global leadership at Northern Kentucky University and a visiting lecturer in International Political Economy for The University of London in Sri Lanka Royal Institute of Colombo and teaches at the International Security at University of Colombo. Abeyagoonasekera has more than a decade of experience in government administration, serving as the head of several government institutions and positions at the board level. His commentaries on International Relations and Geopolitics are published by Observer Research Foundation New Delhi, London School of Economics and South Asia Journal. Abeyagoonasekera writes the monthly column Dateline Colombo for IPCS think tank in New Delhi.

Abeyagoonasekera is the former founding director general of the Institute of National Security Studies Sri Lanka (INSSSL). He was the former executive director of the Lakshman Kadirgamar Institute of International Relations and Strategic Studies (LKIIRSS) which is a Sri Lankan government foreign policy think tank.

== Early life and career ==
Abeyagoonasekera is the only son of Ossie Abeygunasekera, who was the leader of Sri Lanka Mahajana Pakshaya (SLMP), presidential candidate and Member of Parliament from Colombo District. Ossie Abeygunasekera was assassinated by the Liberation Tigers of Tamil Eelam (LTTE) suicide attack in 1994.

His primary and secondary education was at S. Thomas' Preparatory School and Ananda College, he gained BSc in computer science and an MBA from the Edith Cowan University. He has studied at the Harvard Kennedy School, Lee Kuan Yew School of Public Policy, India School of Business, Oxford University and Yale University. He attended Harvard Kennedy School under the US-South Asia leadership program to study counter-terrorism.

He is a Fellow of the National Defense University Washington DC Near East South Asia Center for Strategic Studies NESA and Asia-Pacific Center for Security Studies DKI-APCSS Hawaii and US State Department IVLP

He began his career in Sri Lanka's telecommunication sector as a project manager at Sri Lanka Telecom and Hutchison Lanka from 2001 to 2005.

Abeyagoonasekera joined the government sector in 2005 and was appointed Chairman of the Ceylon Fishery Harbours Corporation (CFHC) following the Asian tsunami in 2004 which destroyed many fishery harbours. He held the post until 2010 after the successful reconstruction of the fishery harbours and transforming the loss-making cooperation into profit. He was appointed Chairman of the Sri Lanka Foreign Employment Agency in 2010 and served until 2011. Abeyagoonasekera was also on the board of directors of the Sri Lanka Ports Authority from 2005 to 2010.

He was appointed as executive director of the Lakshman Kadirgamar Institute for International Relations and Strategic Studies government's foreign policy think tank under the Ministry of Foreign Affairs. During his tenure, the institute published the first foreign policy research journal the 'Kadirgamar Review' and conducted numerous research activities, including the post-war 'National Reconciliation Conference'. In 2012, Kadirgamar Institute's first MOU with an Indian think tank ICWA was signed.

On 10 April 2015, he was appointed as a board director at the Insurance Board of Sri Lanka (IBSL) by the Minister of Finance Ravi Karunanayake. He served as a consultant to the Ministry of Finance until May 2016.

In 2016 August, he was appointed as the founding Director General of the new Security Think tank, the Institute of National Security Studies Sri Lanka.(INSS). During his tenure the institute published multiple defense and security publications. In January 2019, Abeyagoonasekera presented a Monthly Threat Forecast (MTF) to President Maithripala Sirisena highlighting a national security threat; this warning was later referenced in the Presidential Commission of Inquiry on the Easter Attacks (PCOI) on the 2019 Sri Lanka Easter bombings, where he also testified. Abeyagoonasekera was immediately transferred from his position when President Gotabaya Rajapaksa came in to power. Abeyagoonasekera moved to the United States in 2021 and was arrested upon his return to Sri Lanka in July 2024, when he visited his ailing mother.

In 2012, Abeyagoonasekera established "Dirisaviya Foundation" a non-governmental not for profit foundation which operates several initiatives including ipaidabribe.lk, a powerful global crowdsourced anticorruption website, the project Global Dignity for School Children, and the Millennium Project Foresight initiative of Sri Lanka. Dirisaviya Foundation also launched two mobile apps – Sri Dalada and Sinhala Poets. The foundation conducted the memorial lecture of the national hero Ven.S.Mahinda Thero.

In 2018, he authored Sri Lanka at Crossroads: Geopolitical challenges and National Interests, published by World Scientific Singapore. The book was endorsed by former national security advisor of India Shivshankar Menon, former foreign Minister Singapore George Yeo, and many other academics from around the world. In the book, Abeyagoonasekera revisits Halford Mackinder's geopolitical theories while highlighting the geostrategic importance of Sri Lanka.

Abeyagoonasekera is the founding curator of the Global Shapers Colombo Hub and the Global Dignity Country Chair for Sri Lanka.

His research work on international relations and geopolitics is published by Routledge, IGI, NUS ISAS, Emerald, Cambridge University, Hudson Institute, South Asia Journal, ORF India, LSE and IPCS.

In 2021, he authored Conundrum of an Island, a compilation of essays on several themes intended to provoke thought on and promote understanding about everyday political and social life on an island facing constant geopolitical and domestic political challenges. The themes of this book are: 4/21 Terror Attack and National Security; China, Belt and Road Initiative and Sri Lankan Foreign Policy; Geopolitics; Sustaining Democracy and Facing a Pandemic; and Domestic Political Stability, Leadership and Economic Crime.

In 2023, he authored Teardrop Diplomacy: China's Sri Lanka Foray, published by Bloomsbury. The book was endorsed by Dr. David Brewster, Dr.C. Raja Mohan, Dr. Roger Kangas, Daniel Sachs, Lisa Witter and several other academics. Abeyagoonasekera introduces the concept of China's "strategic trap" in Sri Lanka and the implications to Sri Lankan foreign policy during the rule of President Gotabaya Rajapaksa. In 2025 weeks after the Nepal Gen-Z uprising, Abeyagoonasekera launched an Economic Crime & Geopolitics Index (ECGI) developed and conceptualized by him to understand political risk in South Asia and Southeast Asia.

== Recognition ==
In 2012, he was recognized as a Young Global Leader by the World Economic Forum.

In 2015, he was awarded 'Ambassador of Knowledge' from the Life Learning Academia in Slovenia.

In 2021, he was appointed to the 'Global Advisory Council' at the Apolitical Academy Global (AAG) along with the former three-time New Zealand Prime Minister Helen Clark and several other distinguished individuals.

== Works ==
- Towards a Better World Order (2015)
- Sacred Tooth Relic of Sri Lanka (2016)
- The Modi Doctrine (2016)
- Sri Lanka at Crossroads (2019)
- Conundrum of an Island (2021)
- Teardrop Diplomacy (2023)
- Winds of Change (2026)
