= NTJ =

NTJ may stand for:

- National Theatre of Japan
- National Thowheeth Jama'ath
