= St. John's College, Colombo =

- School Logo (Badge)

Location
- Dematagoda Road, Dematagoda, Colombo; Sri Lanka
- Coordinates: 6.930783°N 79.873618°E

Information
- Type: High school
- Motto: Be a Man
- Established: 16 January 1939; 87 years ago
- School district: Colombo
- Grades: 1 - 13
- Colors: Dark blue, sky blue and white

St. John's College, Colombo (Sinhala : ශාන්ත ජෝන් විද්‍යාලය) is a Government school for boys which is hosted by Western Provincial Council. In here about 1,100+ students are studying. This school was established on 16 January 1939 by Rev. Maurice John Legoc. The first principal was B. Wean Sander.
