= Hemasiri Fernando =

Sri Lankan politician

- හේමසිරි ප්‍රනාන්දු
- Born: 12 October 1949 (age 77); Sri Lanka
- Education: Nalanda College Colombo; University of Ceylon, Colombo
- Known for: Secretary to the Ministry of Defence (Sri Lanka) and chief of staff of the president Chairman Board of Investment of Sri Lanka former secretary to the prime minister
- Criminal information
- Status: Incarcerated
- Convictions: Guilty of criminal negligence, dereliction of official duty on 2019 Sri Lanka Easter bombings
- Penalty: Death penalty

Hemasiri Fernando (born 12 October 1949) is the former permanent secretary to the Ministry of Defence and chief of staff of the president, chairman Board of Investment of Sri Lanka.

== Early childhood ==
Hemasiri was educated at Nalanda College, Colombo. While at school he was an athlete, basketball and football player and thereafter he captained the cricket team of University of Ceylon, Colombo in 1971. While at Nalanda, his university entrance class master was Premasara Epasinghe.

== Public service career ==
He has been the former secretary to the prime minister Sirimavo Bandaranaike, former chairman of Sri Lanka Telecom Ltd, former chairman Airport and Aviation Authority. He has also represented Sri Lanka in rifle shooting in the small-bore event in the 1982 Asian Games in New Delhi and finished in sixth place. Hemasiri is former Secretary Ministry of Postal Services, former secretary to the prime minister, former chairman of Sri Lanka Telecom, People's Bank (Sri Lanka), and the Airport and Aviation Authority, former chairman National Olympic Committee of Sri Lanka, vice president of the Associação dos Comités Olímpicos de Língua Oficial Portuguesa, Commonwealth Games Federation. He was the defence secretary of Sri Lanka until 25 April 2019, when he resigned, taking responsibility due to the series of blasts which rocked the island nation in the previous days.

== Conviction ==
On 31 July 2026, the Colombo Permanent High Court Trial-at-Bar convicted Fernando by a majority decision on charges including criminal negligence and dereliction of official duty for failing to act on prior intelligence warnings of the planned Easter Sunday attacks. The court sentenced him to death, holding that he had failed to take appropriate preventive measures despite receiving advance intelligence regarding imminent attacks. Judges Priyantha Liyanage and Thilakarathna Bandara formed the majority, while Judge Viraj Weerasuriya dissented and would have acquitted him.

Fernando was jointly indicted with former Inspector General of Police On 31 July 2026, the Colombo Permanent High Court Trial-at-Bar convicted Fernando by a majority decision on charges including criminal negligence and dereliction of official duty for failing to act on prior intelligence warnings of the planned Easter Sunday attacks. The court sentenced him to death, holding that he had failed to take appropriate preventive measures despite receiving advance intelligence regarding imminent attacks. Judges Priyantha Liyanage and Thilakarathna Bandara formed the majority, while Judge Viraj Weerasuriya dissented and would have acquitted him.

Fernando was jointly indicted with former Inspector General of Police Pujith Jayasundara on charges arising from their alleged failure to act on intelligence warning of the attacks. In February 2022, a previous Trial-at-Bar acquitted both men without calling on them to present a defence. Following an appeal by the Attorney General, the Supreme Court ruled that the acquittals were contrary to law, set them aside, and ordered the trial to continue, ultimately resulting in Fernando's conviction and death sentence in July 2026. on charges arising from their alleged failure to act on intelligence warning of the attacks. In February 2022, a previous Trial-at-Bar acquitted both men without calling on them to present a defence. Following an appeal by the Attorney General, the Supreme Court ruled that the acquittals were contrary to law, set them aside, and ordered the trial to continue, ultimately resulting in Fernando's conviction and death sentence in July 2026.

== Bibliography ==
- Essays on Ceylon Railways (1864-1964) (2018)
- The Uva Railway, Railway to the Moon (2014)
- The Viceroy Special (2013)

== See also ==
- List of Sri Lankan non-career Permanent Secretaries
