= C. D. Wickramaratne =

Sri Lankan police officer (1963–2026)

- සී.ඩී. වික්‍රමරත්න

35th Inspector General of Police
- In office 25 November 2020 – 25 November 2023
- Preceded by: Pujith Jayasundara
- Succeeded by: Deshabandu Tennakoon

Acting Inspector General of Police
- In office 26 April 2019 – 25 November 2020

Personal details
- Born: Chandana Deepal Wickramaratne; 26 March 1963
- Died: 17 July 2026 (aged 63) Thalahena, Sri Lanka
- Education: University of Bradford; General Sir John Kotelawala Defence University; University of Colombo; Ananda College
- Profession: Police officer

Chandana Deepal Wickramaratne (Sinhala: චන්දන දීපාල් වික්‍රමරත්න; 26 March 1963 – 17 July 2026) was a Sri Lankan police officer, who served as the 35th Inspector General of Police from 26 November 2020 to 25 November 2023.

== Early years and career ==
Chandana Wickramaratne was born on 26 March 1963, and received his school education at Ananda College, Colombo. After his graduation from University of Colombo with a degree in physical sciences he joined the Sri Lanka Police service on 16 June 1986, beginning his career as an intelligence officer with the rank of ASP.

He completed a M.Sc. (defence studies in management) at General Sir John Kotelawala Defence University, Ratmalana in 2006, and a postgraduate diploma in conflict resolution and security studies from University of Bradford in 2006.

== Inspector General of Police appointment ==
Wickramaratne served as the senior deputy inspector general of South before his appointment to the post of IGP. On 26 April 2019, President Maithripala Sirisena ordered the then inspector general of police, Pujith Jayasundara, to resign over intelligence failures that led to the fatal Easter bomb attacks. Jayasundara refused to resign and was put on compulsory leave with Wickramaratne appointed the acting Inspector General. The temporary appointment became a controversy as Jayasundara denied the allegations levelled against him by the President filed a court case against the government regarding the intelligence lapse.

He was a senior deputy inspector general when he was appointed to the role of acting inspector-general of police, when the incumbent, Jayasundara, was suspended following the 2019 Easter bombings. On 13 May 2019, Wickramaratne was approved to work as acting IGP by the Constitutional Council. He was confirmed in the position on 25 November 2020 and served till his retirement on 25 November 2023.

== Other cases ==
Wickramaratne also ordered a special investigation to probe statements made by former LTTE cadre Karuna Amman, who claimed to have killed more than 3000 army soldiers at the Elephant Pass during the civil war. He further claimed that Amman was more dangerous than the COVID-19 pandemic.

== Death ==
Wickramaratne died from a self-inflicted gunshot wound at his home in Thalahena, on 17 July 2026, at the age of 63.

Police appointments
Preceded by Pujith Jayasundara	Sri Lankan Inspector General of Police; 2020–2023	Succeeded by Deshabandu Tennakoon
