= Nugagaha Kapalle Illangakoon =

- Born: 12 April 1956 (age 70); Balangoda, Sri Lanka
- Police career
- Country: Sri Lanka Police Service
- Allegiance: Sri Lanka
- Service years: 1982-2016
- Rank: 1982 - Assistant Superintendent of Police (Kurunegala District); 1994 - Senior Superintendent of Police; 1999 -Deputy Inspector General of Police; 2006 - Senior Deputy Inspector General (Western Province); 2011-2016 - Inspector-General of Police
- Other work: Defence Ministry Advisor

Nugagaha Kapalle Illangakoon (born 12 April 1956) was the 33rd Sri Lankan Inspector-General of Police, serving from 16 July 2011 to 11 April 2016. He also served as an advisor to the Ministry of Defence.

== Early life and education ==
Nugagaha Kapalle Illangakoon was born on 12 April 1956 in Balangoda, the youngest in a family of five. He received his education at Udagama Maha Vidyalaya in Balangoda before attending University of Colombo in 1974, where he graduated in 1979 with a Bachelor of Education. He taught Mathematics and Social Science at Hambegamuwe Maha Vidyalaya in Thanamalwila.

== Police career ==
In 1982 Illangakoon joined the Police Service as a Probationary Assistant Superintendent of Police. His first appointment was as the Assistant Superintendent in-charge of the Kurunegala District. He served in Jaffna, Ampara and Batticaloa as Area Commander. In 1983 he was one of the officers responsible for establishing the Police Special Task Force (STF), serving as the Task Force's first Deputy Commandant. Illangakoon was appointed the Director Special Branch in 1999 and promoted to Deputy Inspector General of Police.

On 16 July 2011 he was appointed Inspector-General of Police, replacing the outgoing Inspector-General Mahinda Balasuriya. He retired on 11 April 2016 after five years in the position.

== Later work ==
Following the deadly Easter bomb attacks, Illangakoon was appointed an advisor to the Ministry of Defence in April 2019, and appointed a member of the Presidential Commission of Inquiry on the Easter Attacks headed by Justice Vijith Malalgoda, and including former Law and Order Ministry Secretary, Padmasiri Jayamanne, tasked with investigating the causes and background for the 2019 Sri Lanka Easter bombings.

Police appointments
Preceded by Mahinda Balasuriya	Inspector General of Police; 2011–2016	Succeeded by Pujith Jayasundara
