= St. Sebastian's Church, Katuwapitiya =

Roman Catholic shrine in Katuwapitiya, Negombo, Sri Lanka

Coordinates: 07°12′39.80″N 79°51′33.00″E

- ශාන්ත සෙබස්තියන් දේවස්ථානය, කටුවපිටිය புனித செபஸ்தியார் தேவாலயம், கடுவபிடிய
- Location in Sri Lanka
- Location: Katuwapitiya, Negombo
- Country: Sri Lanka
- Denomination: Roman Catholic

History
- Dedication: Saint Sebastian

Architecture
- Functional status: Active

Administration
- Archdiocese: Colombo

St. Sebastian's Church, Katuwapitiya (Sinhala: ශාන්ත සෙබස්තියන් දේවස්ථානය කටුවපිටි, romanized: Śānta Sebastiyan Dēvasthānaya, Katuwapitiya; Tamil: புனித செபஸ்தியார் தேவாலயம், கடுவபிடிய, romanized: Puṉita Cepastiyāṉ Tēvālayam, Katuwapitiya) is a Roman Catholic church in the Archdiocese of Colombo. It is located in Katuwapitiya, Negombo.

== 2019 Easter bombing ==
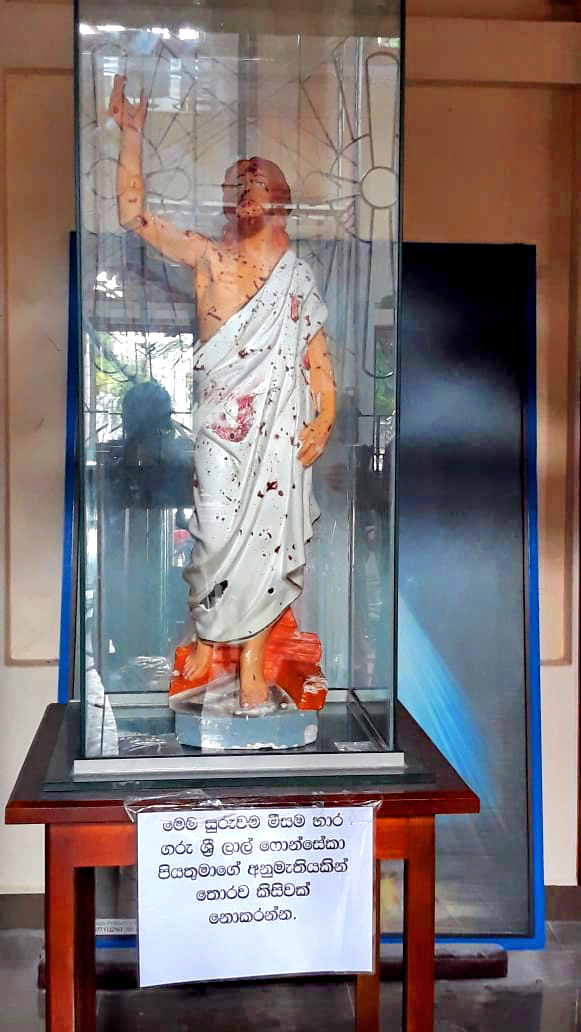
Surviving statue of Risen Jesus with blast marks and human blood after the Easter attack

On 21 April 2019, Easter Sunday, the church was one in a series of targets of a string of bomb blasts across Sri Lanka. Media reported at least 115 people killed at the church, UNICEF reported that 27 children died and 10 children were injured. Altogether 45 children were killed in all blasts. President Maithripala Sirisena visited the church to inquire after the situation and inspect damages. The victims' funeral Mass was conducted at the church premises by Cardinal Malcolm Ranjith.
