= Dematagoda =

Dematagoda දෙමටගොඩ தெமட்டகொடை
- Suburb
- Location in Greater Colombo
- Coordinates: 6°55′48″N 79°52′40″E
- Country: Sri Lanka
- Province: Western Province
- District: Colombo District
- Time zone: UTC+5:30 (Sri Lanka Standard Time Zone)
- Postal Code: 00900

Dematagoda is a suburb of Colombo, Sri Lanka. It is represented by divisional code 9 (Colombo 09). It is surrounded by the suburbs of Borella, Maradana and Kolonnawa. The Baseline Road passes through Dematagoda. It is the only location in Sri Lanka to have two railway stations and the first to have a flyover.

== Schools ==
- Mukarramah International school
- Anurudhdha Balika Maha Vidyalaya
- JMC College International
- Al-manaar School
- Readway College
- Sivalee Vidyalaya
- St. John's College
- St. Matthew's College
- Veluwana College
- Vipulanantha Tamil Maha Vidyalayam
- Wesley College
- Zahira College, Colombo
- Khairiya muslim ladies college
- Al shariya international college

== Transport ==
- Dematagoda Railway Station
- Dematagada - Bambalapitiya (Kiribathgoda-Angulana) buses.

The railway signal and telecommunication engineer's office is situated in Dematagoda.
