= Presidential Commission of Inquiry on the Easter Attacks =

The Presidential Commission of Inquiry on the Easter Attacks is a Presidential Commission of Inquiry in to the deadly Easter bomb attacks appointed by President Maithripala Sirisena on 21 April 2019 tasked with investigating the causes and background for the bombings. The commission is headed by Vijith Malalgoda, Puisne Justice of the Supreme Court of Sri Lanka, Nugagaha Kapalle Illangakoon, retired Inspector-General of Police and Padmasiri Jayamanne, retired Secretary to the Ministry of Law and Order.

Based on its interim report which was submitted in two weeks, the Attorney General Dappula de Livera instructed the Criminal Investigation Department to carryout a criminal investigation against former Defence Secretary Hemasiri Fernando and IGP Pujith Jayasundera to determine if they failed to act on intelligence warnings about the attack.
