= Icon Derelict DeSoto =

Overview
- Manufacturer: Icon Automobile
- Production: 2012
- Designer: Jonathan Ward

Body and chassis
- Related: 1952 Chrysler Town & Country; 1952 DeSoto Sedan

Powertrain
- Engine: 6.1L SRT OHV 16-valve V8
- Transmission: 6-speed automatic

The Icon Derelict DeSoto is a one-off rat rod, modified from a standard 1952 Chrysler Town & Country by ICON. It uses a Chrysler Hemi V8 engine, and features the front end from a DeSoto.

== Specification ==
The Derelict DeSoto was originally built as a Chrysler Town & Country Wagon in 1952, but was rebuilt by Icon into a rat rod as part of their Derelict line. The car features the front end from a 1952 DeSoto sedan, whilst it retains the Town & Country's original rear end. The standard Chrysler Hemi V8 engine was replaced by a 6.1-litre, 425 hp (317 kW; 431 PS) SRT Hemi V8, as used in the Dodge Challenger SRT-8; a 6-speed automatic transmission was also fitted.

== Reception ==
Hot Rod Magazine tested the car in April 2011, and were generally positive. They praised the car's reliability and driveability, although David Freiburger criticized the placement of the fly-by-wire throttle, and both testers criticized the cupholders. In 2012, it was featured on an episode of Jay Leno's Garage.
