= St. Anthony's Shrine, Kochchikade =

Roman Catholic shrine in Colombo 13, Sri Lanka

St. Anthony's Shrine
- Sinhala: ශාන්ත අන්තෝනි සිද්ධස්ථානය; Tamil: புனித அந்தோனியார் திருத்தலம்
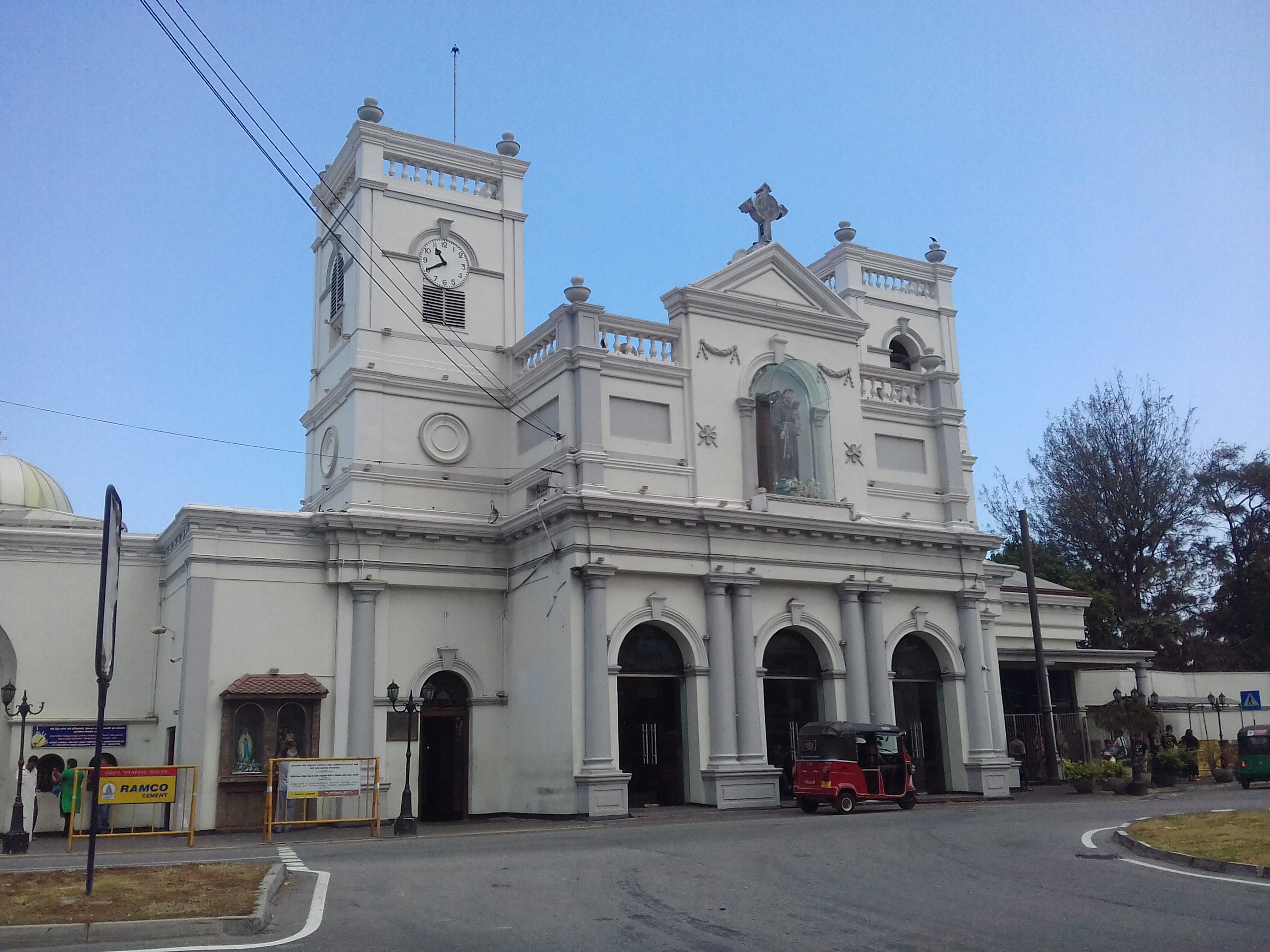

- Location in Colombo Municipality
- 06°56′48.80″N 79°51′21.90″E
- Location: Kotahena, Colombo
- Country: Sri Lanka
- Denomination: Catholic Church
- Sui iuris church: Latin Church

Architecture
- Functional status: Active
- Groundbreaking: 1806; 220 years ago
- Completed: 1828; 198 years ago

Administration
- Archdiocese: Colombo

St. Anthony's Shrine (Sinhala: ශාන්ත අන්තෝනි සිද්ධස්ථානය, romanized: Śānta Antōni Siddhasthānaya; Tamil: புனித அந்தோனியார் திருத்தலம், romanized: Puṉita Antōṉiyār Tiruttalam) is a Catholic church in the Archdiocese of Colombo in Sri Lanka. The church is located at Kochchikade, Kotahena, Colombo 13, and is dedicated to Saint Anthony of Padua. The church is designated a national shrine and minor basilica. A tiny piece of St. Anthony's tongue is preserved in a special reliquary, which is located in a glass case together with a statue of the saint, at the entrance to the church.

== History ==
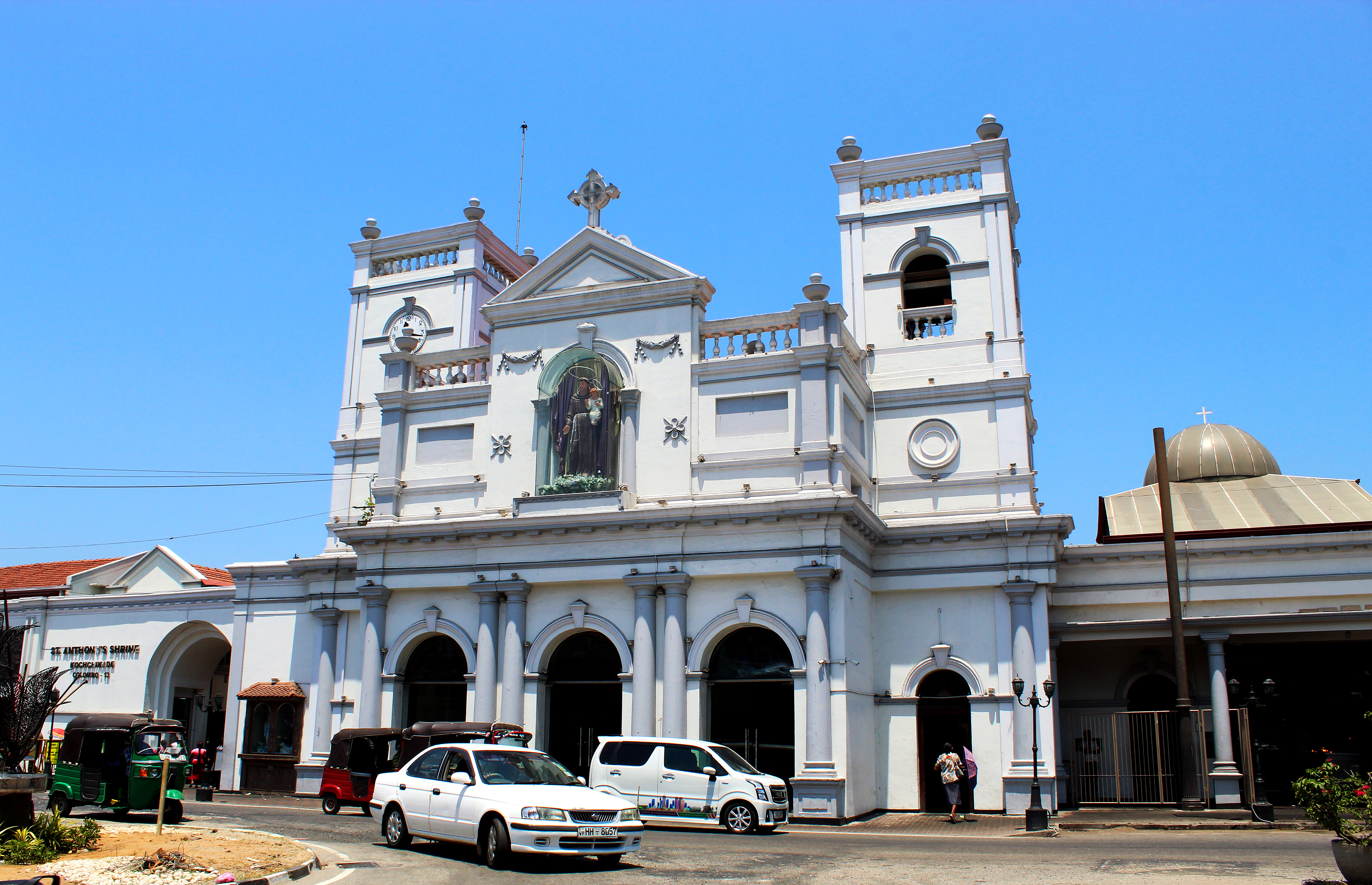
St. Anthony's Shrine before the Easter bombings

The church's origins relate to the early Dutch colonial period when Catholicism was banned from the island, with Catholic priests carrying out sermons from hiding places. Fr. Antonio disguised himself as a local merchant, finding refuge with a local fishing community at Mutwal. According to local legends the community sought his help to stop the sea eroding their village, and Fr. Antonio planted a cross and prayed at the beach, resulting in the sea receding and the community converting to Catholicism. The Dutch authorities then allocated him some land to carry out his sermons, whereupon he built a mud brick chapel dedicated to St. Anthony of Padua (Sant'Antonio da Padova). Fr. Antonio is buried within the church.

In 1806, the chapel was enlarged, and in 1822 one of the members of the Congregation went to Goa and brought back a statue of St. Anthony, which still resides on one of the church's altars. Construction of a new church commenced in 1828 and it was consecrated on 1 June 1834. The church was built in the Neoclassical style. In 1938 the church was improved and enlarged, with the addition of a chorister's gallery, large wings on side, and a mission house and meeting room behind the main altar. The enlarged church was consecrated on 16 February 1940.

Postal stamps worth five rupees were issued by the Sri Lankan government to commemorate the 175th anniversary of the church on 13 June 2010.

== 2019 attack ==
On 21 April 2019, Easter Sunday, the church was one in a series of targets of a string of suicide bomb blasts across Sri Lanka. At least 93 people were killed in the blast. On 9 June, Indian Prime Minister Narendra Modi visited the church, and paid tribute to the victims.

On 12 June 2019, the church was renovated solely by the Sri Lanka Navy and was opened for the public for the first time since the attacks. Cardinal Malcolm Ranjith conducted a special liturgy, remembering the Easter Sunday attack victims. He addressed what he called failures of the Sri Lankan government and its leadership during the occasion.

On 21 April 2025, 167 Catholics who died in the church bombing, along with those who died in the bombing of the Saint Sebastian church in Negombo, were recognised as "witnesses of faith" by the Vatican.
