= Dereliction of duty (disambiguation) =

Dereliction of duty is a specific offense in American military law.

Dereliction of Duty may also refer to:

- Dereliction of Duty (book), by H. R. McMaster, about the Vietnam War
- Dereliction of duty in meeting a legal duty of care
