= Zion Church, Batticaloa =

Evangelical church in Sri Lanka

Zion Church
- சீயோன் தேவாலயம்
- Location in Manressa Road Batticaloa
- 07°42′35.90″N 81°41′43.90″E
- Location: Batticaloa
- Country: Sri Lanka
- Denomination: Evangelical church
- Website: Official website

History
- Status: Closed
- Founded: 1974; 52 years ago
- Founder: Inpam Moses

Architecture
- Functional status: Active

Zion Church is an evangelical church located in Batticaloa. The church is located at No:30/5, Manressa Street, Batticaloa, Sri Lanka.

== History ==
Zion Church was founded by Rev. Inpam Moses in 1974. The senior pastor is Rev. Roshan Mahesan.

The Zion Church is affiliated to the Lighthouse Church in Kandy. Additionally, it is a charismatic church and a member of the Fellowship of Free Churches of Sri Lanka. It broadcasts, Zion FM, a Christian radio programme in the Tamil language.

== Easter Sunday bombings ==
The church was one of the sites affected during the terror attacks which occurred on Easter Sunday on 21 April 2019. The explosion took place at the church between local time 8.45 to 9.30 in the morning during the mass event. The bomber was prevented from entering the church by Ramesh Raju, one of the worshippers, who died in the explosion outside the building. About 25 casualties were reported in the church bombings and few casualties were also reported near the location of the church. More than 100 were wounded. Many of the dead and wounded were children because members of the church's Sunday school had gathered outside the church during a break between their classes and the start of the main service. Several of the wounded succumbed to their injuries in the ensuing months, bringing the death toll to 31.

The church's pastor, Rev Roshan Mahesan, was not in Batticaloa at the time of the bombing as he was visiting the Faith Tamil Baptist Church in Oslo's Grorud Valley in Norway. Subsequently, Mahesan said: "We are hurt. We are angry also, but still, as the senior pastor of Zion Church Batticaloa, the whole congregation and every family affected, we say to the suicide bomber, and also to the group that sent the suicide bomber, that we love you and we forgive you."

President Maithripala Sirisena visited the church on 9 May alongside other politicians to inspect the damage. Cardinal Malcolm Ranjith, Archbishop of Colombo, visited the church on 15 June alongside Catholics to "spread love and brotherhood among those who left the world and among those who sustained injuries".
