= Sainthamaruthu =

Sainthamaruthu சாய்ந்தமருது සායින්දමරුදු
- Town
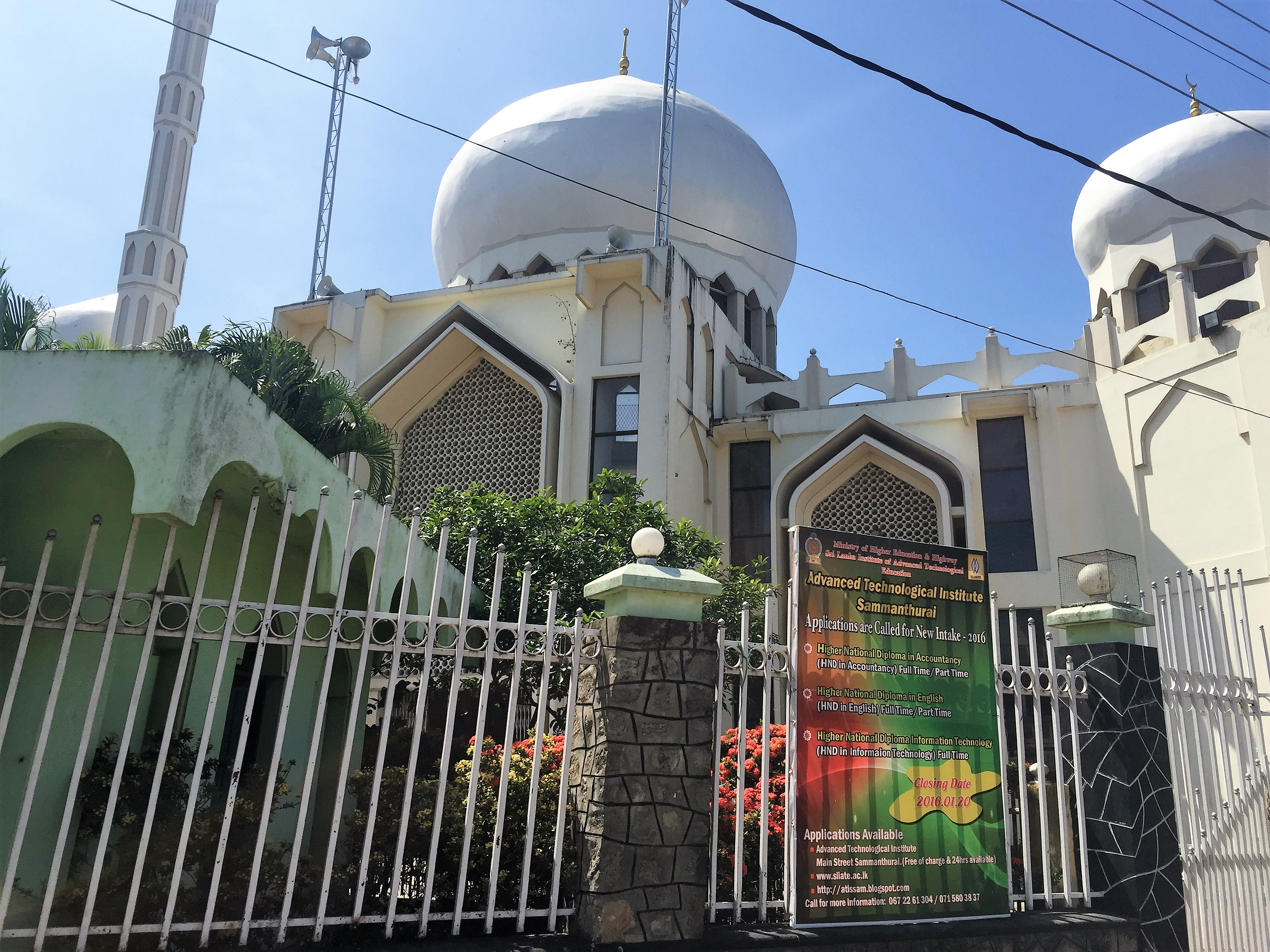

- Location in Sri Lanka
- Coordinates: 7°23′38″N 81°50′2″E
- Country: Sri Lanka
- Province: Eastern Province
- Administrative District: Ampara District
- D.S Division: Sainthamarathu Divisional Secretariat
- Divisional Secretary: M. M. Aseek

Government
  - Body: Kalmunai Municipal Council (Local Authority)
  - Electoral District: Ampara
  - Polling Division: Kalmunai
  - Member of parliament: Abubakar Adambawa ( NPP)

Area
  - Total: 9 km^{2} (3.5 sq mi)
- Elevation: 1 m (3.3 ft)

Population (2011)
  - Total: 29,873
  - Density: 3,000/km^{2} (7,800/sq mi)
- Time zone: UTC+05:30 (SLST)
- Postal code: 32280
- Area code: 067
- Website: www.sainthamaruthu.ds.gov.lk

Sainthamaruthu (Tamil: சாய்ந்தமருது, romanized: Cāyntamarutu; Sinhala: සායින්දමරුදු, romanized: Sāyindamarudu) is a coastal town in Sri Lanka, with a population of 29,873. It is located on the east coast of Ampara District of Eastern Province, Sri Lanka. Sri Lankan Muslims are the majority population, according to the Department of Census and Statistics October 2007.

Sainthamaruthu is located in the middle of other municipalities such as Sammanthurai on the west, Kalmunai on the North, Karativu on the south, and the eastern border with the Bay of Bengal.

== Divisions ==
Sainthamaruthu DS division has 16 Grama Niladhari Divisions. It is bordered by Kalmunai DS division to the north, the sea on the east, Karaitivu DS division to the south and Sammanthurai to the west. As of the 2024 census, 47% of the population are men and 53% are women. 27.8% of the population is between 0-14 years old, 63.8% of the population is between the age of 15-64 and 8.4% of the population is above 65 years of age. The population density of the division is 8,893/sq km.

== Economy ==
Sainthamaruthu is highly urbanised and congested due to increasing commercial activities in the main urban areas of the town. The eastern site is potential for fishing and western site is fully engaged with paddy cultivation.

== Resources and livelihood activities ==
Sainthamaruthu is well endowed with many natural resources. Fisheries, agriculture, and services contribute significantly to the local economy; and trade also plays an important role. It started with petty trade in the early history of the division and nowadays, has expanded to large-scale trading. In early times, fishery activities took place using traditional craft (Katumarang) and ordinary seines and now activity has expanded to deep sea fishing.

Many people living here are engaged in agriculture, fisheries and various other sectors. About 13% of the population is unemployed and many of the workers are poorly paid.

The main agricultural crop is paddy. Around 1132 acres of land are cultivated annually within the division and most of the farmers’ paddy land is situated in the outside of the Sainthamaruthu.

The main sources of income in the local economy of Sainthamaruthu:

- Agriculture (e.g. paddy, coconut, other field crops and horticulture)
- Deep sea and aquatic fisheries.
- Livestock rearing
- Trade
- Micro and small industries
