= National Thowheeth Jama'ath =

Sri Lankan Islamist terrorist group

- Flag of National Thowheeth Jama'ath, which uses the same Black Standard as the Islamic State
- Other name: Arabic: جماعة التوحيد الوطنية, romanized: Jamā‘at at-Tawḥīd al-Waṭanīyah; transl. National Monotheism Group
- Leader: Zahran Hashim †
- Dates active: c. 2016–2019
- Country: Sri Lanka
- Active regions: Sri Lanka (dismantled)
- Ideology: Salafi jihadism Sunni Islamism; Takfirism; Wahhabism; Salafism; Christianophobia
- Size: 100–150 (core members, at peak)
- Part of: IS (claimed)

National Thowheeth Jama'ath (NTJ; Arabic: جماعة التوحيد الوطنية; Jamā‘at at-Tawḥīd al-Waṭanīyah, "National Monotheism Group") was a Sri Lankan Islamist jihadist militant group implicated in the 2019 Sri Lanka Easter bombings. It is believed to have ties to the Islamic State (IS). President of Sri Lanka Maithripala Sirisena banned National Thowheed Jamath on 27 April 2019 and designated it as a terrorist organisation along with Jammiyathul Millathu Ibrahim.

== Aims ==
The group promotes an "Islamist terrorist ideology". The director of the International Center for the Study of Violent Extremism said that it "aims to spread the global jihadist movement to Sri Lanka and to create hatred, fear, and divisions in society."

The NTJ believes that the world was made solely for Muslims and is against other religions. They also do not consider Sufis as Muslims believing them to be Kafirs that should be killed, and they have carried out attacks against Sufi mosques. Since 2016 they began supporting the ideology of Islamic State preaching that all "non-Muslims" must be killed for a Muslim takeover of Sri Lanka.

== History ==
The NTJ was founded by Moulvi Zahran Hashim in the exclusively Muslim town of Kattankudy, which has been called a "fertile ground for extremism" and has seen Arabisation and the spread of Wahhabism since the 1980s with funding from gulf nations.

While Zahran was actively propagating radical Islamism as far as 2013, he only began propagating violent extremism in 2016. However, according to Sufi leaders of Kattankudy Zahran did preach violence early on and even began publishing a magazine from 2013 which had calls for attacks on Sufis. It was from 2016 that Zahran preached about a "Muslim takeover" of Sri Lanka by killing all "non-Muslims" and demanded that the hosting of the Sri Lankan National flag be stopped as it is a threat to the Islamic State. In 2016 Zahran also began to preach against Catholics and Christmas.

The NTJ's leadership had been condemned by several Sri Lankan Muslim organisations in 2016 for advocating extreme fundamentalist indoctrination of children and for clashes with Buddhist monks.

During the 2015 presidential election, Zahran campaigned against the then-president Mahinda Rajapaksa and in favour of Maithripala Sirisena. During the 2015 General Election, however, he used the votes of his 2,000–3,000 followers to make Muslim politicians from both major and minor parties in the Eastern Province to sign an agreement which included a ban on music, gender segregation in seating arrangements, refusal to support "moderate" Muslims and Sufis as well as a condition saying the political parties should support groups such as the National Thawheed Jama'ath. Those that signed the agreement include Shafi Salley, Shibly Farook, M.L.A.M. Hizbullah, A. L. M. Ruby and Abdul Rahman. However Zahran worked against Hizbullah after his supporters played music at one of his events by citing music as Haram.

The group also terrorised the Sufi Muslim population in Kattankudy, who were considered as Kafirs by extremists and, according to Zahran, all Kafirs must be killed according to Sharia law. Sufi mosques were shot and Sufis were targeted by a sword-wielding mob led by Zahran in 2017. Despite complaints by Muslim organisations, the government failed to take proper action against Zahran and the NTJ.

It was later revealed that the police had in fact been trying to ban the organisation and take down their websites since 2017. However the Attorney General's department did not take several letters by the Terrorism Investigation Division seriously and the CDs sent by the TID containing Zahran's lectures were given to lesser officials to watch by Senior State Counsel Malik Aziz who ordered them to compile a report.

The NTJ members included two associates of Zahran who were principal and teacher of Muslim schools respectively and were in charge of looking over his mosques. A NTJ member was part of the parliament staff. 64 Sri Lankan MPs have also accused the former Muslim cabinet minister Rishad Bathiudeen of backing the terrorists. The allegations included supply of empty shell casings to a factory owned by one of the bombers and Rishad's Moulvi advisor being arrested on suspicion of being a terrroist. Bathiudeen rejected ever having such an advisor and rejected asking for release of any of the suspects. K. D. N. Ranjith Asoka, Secretary Ministry of Industry & Commerce, rejected that Rishad requested any shell casings to be supplied to the bomber's factory.

In 2018, NTJ was linked to vandalism of Buddhist statues following anti-Muslim riots in Sri Lanka. The group's propaganda highlighted violence against Muslims in Myanmar, Sri Lanka, India and other countries. Zahran was a radical Islamist imam believed to be the mastermind behind the Sri Lanka bombings, preached on a pro-IS Facebook account, known as "Al-Ghuraba" media, and on YouTube.

=== Shooting police officers in Vavunathivu ===
Two police officers, 35-year-old Niroshan Indika and 28-year-old Ganesh Dinesh, were killed while on duty at a roadblock in Vavunathivu on 29 November 2018. Kethirgamathambi Rajakumaran, also known as Ajanthan, a former cadre of the Liberation Tigers of Tamil Eelam, was arrested in suspicion after the attack. However, following the Easter Sunday attacks in Sri Lanka, a security dragnet launched by the police and security forces nabbed the driver of the NTJ leader Zahran Hashim. He confessed it was National Thowheeth Jama'ath that carried out this attack on the cops. The police based on the confessions also recovered the stolen service weapons of the slain policemen. Defence Secretary Shantha Kottegoda requested the release of Kethirgamathambi Rajakumaran.

=== Easter bombings ===
NTJ was first made known to the Sri Lankan Police when a police officer sent an announcement to the authorities warning about a possible attack on churches 10 days before the 2019 Sri Lanka Easter bombings on 21 April 2019. The report read that "the NTJ is planning to carry out suicide attacks targeting prominent churches as well as the Indian high commission in Colombo." Prime Minister, Ranil Wickremesinghe, remarked that government officials did not receive the advisory and that they would "look into why adequate precautions were not taken."

After the attacks, the Health Minister Rajitha Senaratne confirmed at an 22 April 2019 press conference that all seven of the suicide bombers in the near-simultaneous attacks were Sri Lankan citizens associated with NTJ, but said that foreign links were suspected. Officials earlier blamed the local Islamist group, "National Tawhid", but Al Jazeera correspondent Samer Allawi said the authorities had denied officially accusing the group of responsibility. IS has claimed responsibility for the attacks.

=== Sainthamaruthu shootout ===
On 27 April 2019, Sri Lankan security forces and militants from National Thowheeth Jama'ath clashed after the security forces raided a safe house of the militants. Fifteen people linked to the group, including six children, died during the raid as three cornered suicide bombers blew themselves up. A civilian was also killed in the process.

Security forces found five pairs of white skirts and blouses in the safe house. Investigators found that the militants had bought nine pairs worth Rs. 29,000 on 29 March. Intelligence officials warned that this may be an attempt to launch an attack on Buddhist Temples using women posing as Buddhist devotees. In the 2020s, the group was inactive.

== Strength ==
According to Sri Lankan Government sources the NTJ have 100–150 core members as well as numerous mosque in various regions of Sri Lanka. According to the Muslim community in Kattankudy Zahran's sermons outside the mosques attracted 2,000–3,000 people.

After the government crackdown security forces found caches of weapons and explosives as well as CDs and literature containing Islamic extremist material. Security forces discovered detonators, firearms, ammunition, ammonia packets and other explosives including C4, incendiary bombs, knives, GPS, military camouflage, katana swords, machettes and suicide jackets from various parts of the country.

On 5 May, government forces discovered a 15-acre land in Kattankudy disguised as a farm and is believed to be a training camp for militants and the next day raided a two-story guesthouse in Nuwara Eliya based on intel by arrested suspects. 35 terrorists including the bombers had received firearms training in this place.

The discovery of a large number of swords from Mosques and Muslim homes without known affiliation with the organisation raised concern on the scale of the issue. The government theorised that it may be to cut shrubs or to protect women which was seen as a cover up by the opposition. On 13 May a woman was found with an artillery shell, several tail parts of RPG and mortar shells.

On 27 June, Hayathu Mohamed Ahamed Milan, one of several suspects that were arrested in Jeddah and handed over to Sri Lanka led investigators to several large weapons caches in Kattankudy where over 300 gelignite sticks, 8 litres of gelignite liquid, a stock of detonating cord, 1000 detonators, 485 T56 live ammunition and several other explosive materials were discovered.

On 27 August, police arrested two cadres of the group in Ampara town of Ampara District in the Eastern Province based on information provided by the State Intelligence Service, reports Colombo Page. The arrestees are identified as Muhammed Raisuddin Abdur Rahman (alias Abu Anas) and Seinul Aabdeen Hafsal (alias Abu Rawa).

== Foreign ties ==
The organisation has pledged allegiance to IS, who released a video after the attacks through its AMAQ news agency showing eight men declaring loyalty to its leader, Abu Bakr Al-Baghdadi, under the black IS flag.

The NTJ is believed to have received funding from foreign entities to build its mosques and General Secretary of the SLFP, Dayasiri Jayasekara speaking to the media claimed that there was "firm evidence" to prove that religious extremists in Saudi Arabia and Qatar have been funding Islamic extremists in Sri Lanka and requested the Saudi and Qatari government to take action against these groups.

Multiple Indian nationals with ties to the NTJ were arrested in India and several Sri Lankan nationals living in the Middle East were arrested and extradited to Sri Lanka in 2019.

== See also ==
- List of non-state terrorist incidents in Sri Lanka
