= Patrick de Silva Kularatne =

Sri Lankan (Sinhala Buddhist) educationist and politician

Hon. Patrick de Silva Kularatne
- Born: 31 March 1893; Ambalangoda, Sri Lanka
- Died: 16 November 1976 (aged 83)
- Education: Richmond College, Galle; Wesley College, Colombo, University of London
- Occupations: Teacher and politician

Patrick de Silva Kularatne (31 March 1893 – 16 November 1976) (known as P de S Kularatne) was a Sri Lankan educationist and politician. He was a Member of the State Council of Ceylon (1942–1947) and Member of Parliament (1960–1965). He served as Principal of Ananda College and Dharmaraja College and established Nalanda College Colombo, Ananda Balika Vidyalaya, Moratuwa Vidyalaya and Dharmapala Vidyalaya. As a member of the executive committee on Education, he played an instrumental role in the realisation of free education from kindergarten to university.

== Early life and education ==
Born Sella Kapu Pamis de Silva in Ambalangoda on 31 March 1893, to Sella Kapu Isaac Appu, later known as Sella Kapu Isaac de Silva and Pinnaduwa Hewa Alonchihamy Lokuhamy. His father was a master carpenter and an owner of a small plantation. He was the youngest of five siblings and his mother died when he was two. He had three elder sisters and one elder brother Heron, who became a proctor in Galle.

Receiving his early education at the village school, he attended Richmond College in Galle, where his form master was C. W. W. Kannangara. He had passed the Cambridge Junior Local exam with distinction in arithmetic and mathematics in 1907 and Cambridge Senior Local exam with distinction in Latin and mathematics in 1909, and won the Ceylon Mathematics Prize in 1910. In 1912, he transferred to Wesley College, Colombo and won the Government Arts Scholarship to study in Britain. He left Ceylon in March 1913 and entered University of London. He gained a BA in mathematics and a BSc in 1916; having enrolled in the University College, London, he gained an LL.B in 1917, becoming a barrister from the Middle Temple in November 1917. He had adopted the name Patrick de Silva Kularatne by this time. He was offered the post of principle of Ananda College by D. B. Jayatilaka and returned to Ceylon.

== Educationist career ==
=== Principal of Ananda College ===
On 1 January 1918, following his return to Ceylon, he began his duties as principal of Ananda College. In 1919, the Dutugemunu fund was inaugurated. The funds raised paid for the first building of the Kularatne era, with nine classrooms. That same year, eight classes for Buddhist monks began. In the same month a 4-acre (16,000 m^{2}) block of land was made available for the college playground at Campbell Place. He was able to win the cooperation of current British Governor Sir Graeme Thomson, Sir Herbert Stanley and Sir Murchison Fletcher in his effort to acquire more space for Ananda College and Nalanda College Colombo. On 31 March 1922, Thompson laid the foundation stone for a sixteen classroom building at Campbell Place. In August of the same year the first stage of the two storied hostel was opened. Nobel laureate Rabindranath Tagore visited the college on 10 November 1922, as chief guest at the annual prize giving. He declared on that occasion: "I acknowledge that the life of Ananda is its humility and unassuming nature." Mahatma Gandhi visited Ananda in 1927. In 1928 the college won the Herman Loos cup for the best cadet platoon and the Stubs challenge shield for boxing. In 1929 Ananda won the CVRA shield for rifle shooting. Dr. Evans-Wendtz, an American Buddhist, visited Ceylon on the invitation of Kularatne and took part in a series of debates on Buddhist topics. Rev. Highfield of Wesley College and Rev. Father Legoc of St. Joseph's College contributed to this discussion. In a novel experiment for that era, Kularatne encouraged his staff to write textbooks in English on geography, history, botany, and other sciences. Under his auspices, the study of science became popular. Kularatne started classes for teaching Tamil to Sinhalese students and Sinhala to Tamil students. C. Suntharalingam, professor of mathematics of the Ceylon University stated: "Kularatne has helped the people of Ceylon to shed their inferiority complex, at least in the secondary schools. He contributed directly to a Buddhist revival and indirectly to a national revival in this Lanka of ours." Under his stewardship Ananda was registered as a collegiate school with a separate primary school. Students were coached to sit the University of London intermediate, pre-medical and entrance examinations. He introduced teaching kindergarten in the mother tongue him well before it was required by the Department of Education. He instilled a national consciousness in students and laid emphasis on a Buddhist education. The school became a viable alternative to missionary schools for Buddhist students. Kularatne promoted racial unity and co-existence. The teachers in his schools included Hindus, Muslims, Christians and Indians. The staff included C. Sundaralingam (a mathematician), Professor. G.P. Malalasekera, Dr. T.B Jayah, D. W. J. Perera and J. N. Jinendradasa. Jayah and Jinendradasa later took over the administration of Zahira College, Colombo and Nalanda College, Colombo respectively.

=== Principal of Dharmaraja College ===
Kularatne served as the principal at Dharmaraja College from 1932 and 1936, on request of the Buddhist Theosophical Society. Dharmaraja was facing a financial crisis when Kularatne assumed duties, and even the Lake View premise was under threat of being sold. But Kularatne, was able to save the land and secure a home for Dharmaraja for the future. He restored the hostel and transformed the principal's quarters at the city premises to classrooms and a laboratory complex, and Dharmaraja started teaching science subjects in 1933. The first academic buildings in Lake View were built around this time and a part of the students were taken there. The roads and other facilities were also developed so that Lake View transformed from a shrubbery into a property any school would be proud to own. Cadetting in Dharmaraja also began during Kularatne's office and so did many other sports including tennis, swimming etc. In 1935 Dharmaraja was visited by four distinguished visitors from India; Rabindranath Tagore, Nandalal Bose, Uday Shankar and Kalki Krishnamurthy.

=== Later work ===
He returned to Ananda in 1936, where he served as principal till his retirement in 1943. From 1943 to 1944, he served as the Manager of the Buddhist Theological Society Schools and again from 1949 to 1954. The society ran over 300 schools.

== Political career ==
=== State Council ===
Kularatne, who had gained a reputation as an educationist, was active in pre-independence politics of Ceylon. He was a member of the Ceylon National Congress and served as its president. He contested the 1936 State Council election from Balapitiya electorate and was elected to the 2nd State Council of Ceylon. There he joined the executive committee on Health.

=== Post-independence ===
He contested the 1947 general election from the Ambalangoda-Balapitiya electorate from the United National Party, but lost. He left the United National Party and joined the Sri Lanka Freedom Party when S. W. R. D. Bandaranaike formed the party in 1951. He was the second party secretary of Sri Lanka Freedom Party. He contested the 1952 general election from the Colombo Central electorate from the Sri Lanka Freedom Party, but lost. He played a major role in the Bandaranaike's landslide victory in the 1956 general election. Following the death of Bandaranaike and the political upheaval that followed, Kularatne joined the United National Party. He contested and lost the March 1960 general election from the Ambalangoda electorate, but was elected to the House of Representatives in the July 1960 general election and sat in the opposition. He crossed over and sat as an independent member, having resigned from the United National Party over its opposition to the governments move to take over private schools run by the Church by the Assisted Schools and Training Colleges (Special Provisions) Act No 5 of 1960, which he supported. He lost his seat in the 1965 general election when he contested from the Ambalangoda electorate from the Sri Lanka Freedom Party.

=== Attempted military coup ===
On Saturday 27 January 1962 Kularatne, who was in Ambalangoda, received a call from his daughter Maya. She informed him that her husband Stanley Senanayake who was the Superintendent of Police (SP) (Colombo) in charge of police for the city of Colombo, had been approached that morning by C.C. Dissanayake, the Deputy Inspector General of Police (DIG) for Range I on a secret plan by senior members of the police and military to carry out a coup d'état to topple the government of Sirima Bandaranaike. Kularatne immediately came to Colombo and proceeded to Srawasthi Mandiraya, the hostel for members of parliament. Finding no-one there he, went to the Orient Club, knowing that the Inspector General of Police Walter Abeykoon would be there playing bridge. He informed Abeykoon of the planned coup. Abeykoon called the head of the Criminal Investigation Department (CID) S. A. Dissanayake and instructed to look into the matter and went on to play bridge. Later that evening Kularatne went to Temple Trees two times, taking with him Stanley Senanayake on his second visit. The government stopped the coup and prosecuted the conspirators. No mention of Kularatne's involvement was made until J. R. Jayewardene gave thanks to Kularatne in his speech in parliament in bringing to light the planned coup.

== Later life ==
In the late 1960s he became the chairman of the publishing house, Kularatne & Co. He died on 16 November 1976. His remains lay in state at Ananda College, before final rites took place at the Colombo General Cemetery.

== Personal life ==
Kularatne married Hilda Muriel Westbrook on 11 December 1920. She had come to Ceylon from England in January 1920 as an English teacher to Ananda College. Hilda Kularatne later served as the principal of Ananda Balika and she founded the Sri Sumangala Girls' School at Panadura and the Maliyadewa Girls' School at Kurunegala. She was awarded an MBE for her services for education in Ceylon. They had three children: Ananda, Parakrama and Maya. The eldest Ananda, a Pilot Officer Ananda Kularatne served as a RAF pilot in Bomber Command during World War II, was killed when his Halifax Bomber failed to return from a raid. His younger son Parakrama (always called 'Malli'), a civil engineer, married Lalani, the daughter of Justice A. R. H. Canekeratne and Nellie de Mel; they emigrated to New Zealand with their two sons in 1971. His daughter Maya married Stanley Senanayake, who would become the Inspector General of Police.

He was a member of the Buddhist Theosophical Society, YMBA, Rotary Club of Colombo and the Orient Club. He was a keen Bridge player and was the Vice Patron of the Ceylon Bridge Federation in 1971. Following his return from Britain in 1918, he lived in a house allocated to the principal of Ananda College. He lived thereafter in Gangasiri, Panadura; Charles Circus, Colombo; Pamankada; Orient Club and, finally, moving in with his daughter at Stanmore Crescent until his death. He owned a house in Ambalangoda. His wife Hilda moved back to Britain in 1946 to look after her parents; she returned in 1948 but did not live with Kularatne again. She moved again to London in 1955, to serve as Warden at the Ceylon Students Centre. She died on 5 January 1956.

== Legacy ==
Patrick de Silva Kularatne died on 16 November 1976 and was honoured as a national hero by the release of a stamp by Sri Lanka Post on 22 May 1987. Ananda College paid tribute to him by erecting an auditorium and naming it the 'Kularatne Hall' and the Kularathna Maha Vidyalaya in Ambalangoda was named after him.

== See also ==
- 1962 Ceylonese coup d'état attempt
