= Operation Yukthiya =

Ongoing Sri Lankan anti-narcotics operation

- Part of Aftermath of Sri Lanka civil war
Date	17 December 2023 – present (2 years and 9 months)
Location	Sri Lanka
Status	Ongoing

Belligerents
Sri Lanka; Sri Lanka Police; Special Task Force; Sri Lanka Army; United States	Drug dealers

Commanders and leaders
(Sri Lanka) Anura Kumara Dissanayake; (Sri Lanka) Harini Amarasuriya; (Sri Lanka) Ananda Wijepala; (Sri Lanka) Priyantha Weerasooriya; (Sri Lanka) Sampath Thuyacontha; Lasantha Rodrigo; Y.A.B.M. Yahampath; Kanchana Banagoda; K.D.D.C. Fernando; Vasu Bandu Edirisinghe; Lasitha Sumanaweera; Former: (Sri Lanka) Ranil Wickremesinghe; (Sri Lanka) Dinesh Gunawardena; (Sri Lanka) Tiran Alles; (Sri Lanka) Vijitha Herath; (Sri Lanka) Deshabandu Tennakoon; (Sri Lanka) Kamal Gunaratne; Vikum Liyanage; W.H.K.S. Peiris; S.R.B. Aluvihare; Dinesh Nanayakkara; Chandana Wickramasinghe; D.K.S.K. Dolage; Priyantha Perera; Jayantha Kularathna; Pradeep Rathnayake; R. A. U. P. Rajapaksa; Sampath Wickremeratne	Unknown

Casualties and losses
- 100+ killed (including shootouts, extrajudicial killings and deaths in custody), 121,957+ suspects arrested

Operation Yukthiya (Sinhala: යුක්තිය මෙහෙයුම, lit. 'Operation Justice'), also known as Sri Lanka's Drug War is an ongoing anti-drug trafficking operation conducted by the Sri Lanka Police following directives from the Ministry of Public Security.

== History ==
=== 2023 ===
Beginning on 17 December 2023, the police, Special Task Force and Sri Lanka Army carried out islandwide raids and military-backed crackdowns against drug trafficking, with 38,525 suspects being arrested as of 17 January 2024. Authorities seized hundreds of kilograms of illegal drugs, valued at approximately 4.7 billion Sri Lankan rupees. Then-incumbent Minister of Public Security Tiran Alles stated that crime rates across the country fell by 17% within the first month of the operation.

On 25 December 2023, underworld figure Don Indika alias ‘Manna Roshan’ and his accomplice were killed during a clash between two rival underworld gangs.

=== 2024 ===
On 18 January 2024, a lorry driver was shot and killed by a plainclothes police officer during a stop-and-search in Narammala.

On 22 January, five people were shot dead by drug traffickers near the Beliatta exit of the Southern Expressway, including leader of the Our Power of People's Party Saman Perera.

On 30 March, notorious drug trafficker “Location Kudu Malli” was arrested by the Badalgama Police and was caught with 6,120 milligrams of drugs.

=== 2025 ===
On 11 February 2025, convenor of the Nawa Sinhale National Movement Dan Priyasad was arrested and remanded by police for an investigation over an alleged incident of forcing the Nan Eriya Police OIC not to arrest a drug trafficker in 2024.

On 19 February, notorious drug trafficker and organised criminal "Ganemulla Sanjeewa" was shot dead at the Aluthkade Courts Complex by an assailant disguised as an attorney.

=== 2026 ===
Between 5 and 6 July, a prison riot at Negombo Prison, an incarceration facility managed by the Department of Prisons, leaves around 25 people dead and over 100 injured.

On 2 September, a joint US-Sri Lanka operation has seized approximately one tonne of methamphetamine, which Sri Lanka's Minister of Public Security, Ananda Wijepala, said came mainly from Pakistan and Afghanistan.

== Human rights violations ==
Operation Yukthiya has notably drawn criticism from the United Nations Human Rights Council, the Human Rights Commission of Sri Lanka, and various other human rights groups, who have expressed concerns over the mass arrests and potential human rights violations. Tiran Alles dismissed criticisms and reaffirmed his commitment to the operation.

== See also ==
- Human rights in Sri Lanka
