= Cyril Dissanayake =

C.C. Dissanayake
- Born: Ceylon
- Died: Sri Lanka
- Other name: Jungle
- Police career
- Allegiance: Ceylon
- Department: Ceylon Police Force
- Service years: 1934 - 1963
- Rank: Deputy Inspector-General of Police

Cyril Cyrus "Jungle" Dissanayake, MVO was a Sri Lankan senior police officer. He was serving as Deputy Inspector-General of Police of Range I, when he was implicated as one of the leaders of the attempted military coup of 1962.

== Education ==
Dissanayake was educated at Royal College, Colombo and at Ceylon University College where he was an active sportsman.

== Career ==
He joined the Ceylon Police Force as a Probationary Assistant Superintendent of Police in the Ceylon Police Force in June 1934. Having completed his service examinations, he was appointed Assistant Superintendent of Police, Galle in June 1936; Colombo District (North) in February 1937 before undergoing training at Hendon Police College in 1939. On his return in November 1939, he was appointed Assistant Superintendent of Police, Chilaw; Kegalle in December 1941; Colombo Division (North) in May 1942; Avissawella in August 1942; Gampaha in August 1943. In April 1945, he was appointed Acting Superintendent of Police of the Eastern and North-Central Provinces and was confirmed in June 1946. In August 1946 he took over as Superintendent of Police, Kandy; May 1947 of Sabaragamuwa; November 1948 of Western Province (North) and in January 1950 Superintendent of Police, Colombo. In 1950 he underwent a course in Traffic Control in India. In 1953, he was appointed Acting Deputy Inspector-General of Police of Range I and later confirmed. He was in this position during the Hartal 1953 and during riots of 1958. In 1954, he was appointed a Member of the Royal Victorian Order (MVO) for service to Queen Elizabeth II. During police serviced he received the Ceylon Police Medal for Meritorious Service, Defence Medal 1939-45, Ceylon Police Independence Medal and the Service Medal of the Order of St John. In 1959, when Inspector General of Police Osmund de Silva was sent on compulsorily retirement by Prime Minister S. W. R. D. Bandaranaike for refusing to carryout orders which Osmund de Silva considered unlawful, DIG Dissanayake was next in line for the post of Inspector General of Police based on the seniority list. Bandaranaike however appointed M. Walter F. Abeykoon, a civil servant instead. Dissanayake tendered his resignation, but it was later withdrawn.

== Coup d'etat attempt ==
As member of the Christian elite, who ever being deprived of the influence they once had due to the Sinhalaisation process started by Prime Minister S.W.R.D. Bandaranaike and carried on by Sirimavo Bandaranaike, several disgruntled Christian officers of the army, navy and police began to plot a coup similar to that of General Ayub Khan in Pakistan.

The coup members intended to carry out the coups d'état at midnight 27 January 1962 under the instigation of J.F.D. Liyanage of the Ceylon Civil Service and leadership of Colonel F. C. de Saram and C.C. Dissanayake. Colonel de Saram, who would command the military units of the corps and C.C. Dissanayake the police units. The plan was to use troops from the Ceylon Artillery and several other volunteer units along with scout cars of the Ceylon Armoured Corps and policemen to detain the Prime Minister Sirimavo Bandaranaike at Temple Trees (the official residence of the prime minister) and round up cabinet ministers, the Permanent Secretary for Defence and External affairs, the Inspector General of Police, DIG (Director of CID), SP (CID) and the acting Navy Commander. The Army Commander were to be restrained too. Colombo placed under curfew and cut off from regular army units based at the Panagoda Cantonment. After the coup members gain control, the newly-self appointed Major-General F. C. De Saram, General Officer Commanding Ceylon, was to command all Military establishments and would have the Governor-General of Ceylon Sir Oliver Goonetilleke to dissolve parliament. C.C. Dissanayake would become acting Inspector General of Police.

However one of the plotters, SP of Colombo Stanley Senanayake who was brought into the plot that morning by Dissanayake warned the government and all the plotters were arrested. Since no actual coup had happened the government was determined to punish the accused and with the cabinet carrying out the investigation instead of the police, had them confined to solitary confinement in hope of getting a confession. Finally, F. C. de Saram did make a confession, taking all blame for the coup that would become the prosecution's main article of evidence. Dissanayake made no confession, however the day after his arrest he was removed of his post in the police. On 3 June 1963, he was convicted with 11 others out of the 24 accused and sentenced to 10 years in jail and confiscation of property after laws had been modified the government in order to convicted the plotters. The conviction was overruled on appeal to the Judicial Committee of the Privy Council, which ruled that the new Act had denied fair trial, since the new laws only effect the accused.

== Family ==
He and his wife had two daughters and a son. His son T.D.S.A. Dissanayake became a Sri Lanka and UN diplomat going on to become Sri Lankan Ambassador to Indonesia and Egypt. The current Colombo district Member of Parliament Ravi Karunanayake is his grandson. His brother was DIG S.A. Dissanayake, who was the Director of the Criminal Investigation Department, he was on the list of those to be arrested during the coup, but in turn played a pivotal role in stopping the coup. S. A. Dissanayake went on to become the Inspector General of Police.

== External links and references ==
- Coup of 1962: an inside story, by former diplomat T. D. S. A. Dissanayaka, son of C.C. "Jungle" Dissanayake
- Looking back on operation `Holdfast'
- THE QUEEN v. CYRIL CYRUS DISSANAYAKA
- JR's Kandy March and the tale of ‘Imbulgoda Veeraya’
- How tough cops got over tricky situations, Former DIG Vamadevan recalls police life in old Ceylon
