= T. D. S. A. Dissanayake =

Sri Lankan diplomat and writer

T.D.S.A. Dissanayake is a Sri Lankan diplomat and writer, who has served as Sri Lankan ambassador to Indonesia and Egypt.

== Early life and education ==
Dissanayake was born to a family of police officers, his father was C. C. "Jungle" Dissanayake a former Senior Deputy Inspector General of Police (SDIG) and his uncle S.A. "Jingle" Dissanayake was a former Inspector General of Police. He was educated at the Royal College Colombo, the University of Ceylon and Harvard University.

After graduating from University of Ceylon he had hope to join the Ceylon Police Force following his family tradition. However he was prevented from doing so when his father was implicated as one of the leaders of the attempted military coup in 1962.

== Diplomatic career ==
He did a spell working in the UN and went on to become Sri Lankan ambassador to Indonesia and Egypt.

== Writing career ==
Since 1975 Dissanayake has published 16 books mostly regarding the politics and history of Sri Lanka.

== Bibliography ==
- War or Peace in Sri Lanka (2002)
- The Agony of Sri Lanka

== See also ==
- Sri Lankan Non Career Diplomats

Diplomatic posts
Preceded by ?	Sri Lankan Ambassador to Indonesia ?	Succeeded by ?
Preceded by ?	Sri Lankan Ambassador to Egypt ?	Succeeded by ?
