= Laetitia Anna Layard Dowbiggin =

British missionary

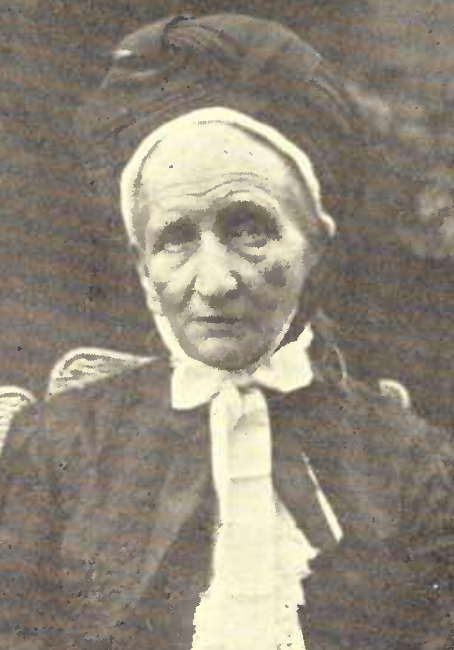
- Laetitia Anna Layard Dowbiggin, from a 1922 publication.
- Born: Laetitia Anna Layard; 7 February 1844; Colombo
- Died: 5 December 1930 (aged 86); Colombo
- Occupations: Missionary, educator
- Children: 7, including Herbert Dowbiggin
- Parent: Charles Peter Layard
- Relatives: Charles Layard (brother)

Laetitia Anna Layard Dowbiggin (7 February 1844 – 5 December 1930) was a British Christian missionary and teacher in Ceylon (now Sri Lanka).

== Early life ==
Laetitia Anna Layard was born in Colombo, Ceylon, one of the nine children of Sir Charles Peter Layard and Louisa Anne Layard. Her father was also born in Colombo, and was the city's first mayor. Her brother Charles Layard was Attorney General of Ceylon.

Other notable members of the extended Layard family of Ceylon included archaeologist Austen Henry Layard and his brother Edgar Leopold Layard.

== Career ==
Dowbiggin and her husband were Anglican missionaries with the Church Mission Society at Cotta (Kotte) in Ceylon, her home country, from 1869 to 1901. They founded a church at Angampitiya, and boarding schools for boys and girls, during their work. She served as the girls' school matron, overseeing between forty and eighty resident students, into her widowhood, retiring in 1906.

She took a furlough in England in 1910 and 1911, then returned to Ceylon to live at Liyanwela as an independent missionary and community worker. "She had a remarkable way of keeping in touch with the old girls, and a wonderful power of winning and retaining the love of her pupils," according to a history published in 1922.

== Personal life ==
Laetitia Anna Layard married Rev. Robert Thomas Dowbiggin in 1869. Their seven children included Herbert Layard Dowbiggin, who became a forensics expert and Inspector General of Police in Ceylon. The Dowbiggins took a furlough in 1891; Laetitia Dowbiggin spent time in England in 1896 at her daughter's deathbed. She was widowed when her husband died at sea in 1901, and she lived with her single sisters Mary, Matilda, and Henrietta in Surrey for a time after that, and again in 1911. She died in 1930, aged 86 years, at a nursing home in Colombo.
