= Stanley Senanayake =

18th Inspector General of the Sri Lanka Police

18th Inspector General of Police (Sri Lanka)
- In office September 1970 – 23 August 1978
- Preceded by: Aleric Abeygunawardena
- Succeeded by: Ana Seneviratne

Personal details
- Born: Don Stanley Ernest Perera Rajapakse Senanayake; 23 August 1917 Kitulgala, Ceylon
- Died: 18 December 1989 (aged 72)
- Spouse: Maya née Kularatne
- Children: 4
- Profession: Police officer

Don Stanley Ernest Perera Rajapakse Senanayake (23 August 1917 – 18 December 1989) was the 18th Inspector General of the Sri Lanka Police (IGP) (1970–1978). Senanayake is the second longest serving IGP, after Sir Herbert Dowbiggin (who served 24 years), remaining in the position for seven years.

== Early life and education ==
Educated at St. John's College, Panadura and at the University College, Ceylon, Senanayake gained a BA degree.

== Family ==
On 8 January 1948 Senanayake married Maya Kularatne (1926–2017), the daughter of Patrick de Silva Kularatne (1893–1976), founder of Nalanda College, Colombo, founding principal of Ananda College and Hilda Muriel Westbrook Kularatne, who founded Sri Sumangala Girls' School, Panadura and the Maliyadewa Girls' School, Kurunegala.

== Police career ==
He joined the Ceylon Police Force as a Probationary Assistant Superintendent Police (ASP) in December 1943, by appointment of the Governor. Having passed his service exams, he was appointed ASP Matugama in December 1945, ASP attached to Western Province in April 1946, ASP Colombo Division in October 1946, ASP Ratnapura April 1948, ASP Kegalle in November 1949; ASP, Matale in August 1952 and thereafter ASP, Kurunegala. Senanayake succeeded Sydney de Zoysa, in 1955, as the Director of the Police Training School, Kalutara. In 1960 he was transferred to Colombo as the Superintendent of Police, Colombo.

S. W. R. D. Bandaranaike, soon after becoming Prime Minister in 1956, decided to remove the incumbent Inspector General of Police, Osmund de Silva, as he had declined to do the Prime Minister’s bidding on the basis that he believed the request was not lawful. As a result there was an outcry from the public, in particular the Buddhist community, on the grounds that de Silva was the first Buddhist to ever reach the ranks of IGP. Bandaranaike was adamant that de Silva be replaced however in order to overcome the protest of Buddhists, the Prime Minister selected M. W. F. Abeykoon, a senior civil servant, who was also a Buddhist as his preferred candidate.

The senior police officers, who were predominantly Christian, fearing a calamity, met to consider their options. They considered whether the entire police executive resign en masse, although they decided against this as they thought it had the potential to cause the entire police service to collapse. Alternatively they looked at who was the most senior Buddhist officer within the service, which happened to be Senanayake. The senior officers then made a deputation to the Prime Minister urging him to appoint Senanayake as the IGP, on the basis that they were more prepared to work under an officer who was junior in tenure than all of them, as opposed to working under an individual who had no knowledge of the police service. Bandaranaike however ignored their representations and appointed Abeykoon.

Senanayake found himself drawn into the coup d’état attempt in January 1962, where a number of the key senior military and policy officers planned to topple the government. The coup leaders insisted that Senanayake join them, mainly because he was the Superintendent of Police Colombo. Senanayake was torn between the loyalty to the country and loyalty to the police service and to his fellow senior officers. His wife Maya passed information of the proposed coup to her father, Patrick de Silva Kularatne, MP and party secretary of the Sri Lanka Freedom Party. This action ultimately led to the Government being able to thwart the coup before it commenced. At that time, Senanayake's conduct in this affair was the focus of many controversies. The Judges of the Trial at Bar who heard the coup case, however exonerated him, observing in their judgment:

"Evidence elicited by the defence satisfies us that Stanley Senanayake was an officer who was honourable and loyal to his Service, his colleagues and his friends. These qualities help much to explain conduct on his part which might otherwise have aroused suspicion. Although he was cross-examined with severity and even some measure of contempt, he did not respond with any appearance of malice against the defendants. On the contrary, he impressed us as a witness who did not relish the role of testifying against brother officers."

In September 1970 Senanayake was appointed the Inspector General of Police by Prime Minister Sirimavo Bandaranaike when she won her second term. He succeeded Aleric Abeygunawardena. In April 1971, JVP Insurrection started taking the government unprepared. The police had information on JVP preparations, but these were not followed up until the first police station was attacked at dawn on 5 April 1971 preempting the general attack. This gave the police and military to prepare and withstand the initial wave of attacks and counter attack. Senanayake retired in August 1978. He died 18 December 1989.
