= Charles Layard =

Charles Layard may refer to:

- Sir Charles Layard (judge) (1849–1915), chief justice of Ceylon
- Charles Layard (priest) (1750–1803), dean of Bristol
- Sir Charles Peter Layard (1806–1893), mayor of Colombo
