= Chandra Fernando =

Chandra Fernando may refer to:

- Chandra Fernando (police officer), police officer
- Chandra Fernando (priest), priest
