= Philip Norton Banks =

British colonial Inspector-General of Police in Ceylon (Sri Lanka)

Philip Norton Banks KPM, CSE

9th Inspector General of Police (Sri Lanka)
- In office 1937–1942
- Preceded by: Herbert Dowbiggin
- Succeeded by: Gordon Halland

Commissioner Ethiopian Imperial Police
- In office 1942–1956
- Preceded by: Laid Low
- Succeeded by: Tsige Dibu

Personal details
- Born: 1889 Kensington, England
- Died: 2 April 1964 Colchester, Essex
- Profession: Police officer

Philip Norton Banks KPM, CSE (1889 – 2 April 1964) was the ninth British colonial Inspector-General of Police in Ceylon (Sri Lanka).

Banks was educated at The New Beacon and Bradfield College and entered the Ceylon Police in 1909 and advanced to the position of Assistant Superintendent in 1912 and then to Superintendent in 1917. Following the outbreak of World War I he returned to the UK, was commissioned as a 2nd Lieutenant in the 1st Battalion, King's Royal Rifle Corps and saw active service on the Western Front in France and Flanders.

In 1919 following the end of the war he returned to his previous employ in Ceylon, after serving in the 5th (Reserve) Battalion of the King's Royal Rifle Corps, Banks was promoted to Superintendent of Police (Grade 1) in 1924 and to Deputy Inspector-General in the Criminal Investigation Department in March 1932. Banks was appointed Inspector-General of Police in 1937, after earlier in the year being presented with the King's Police Medal by the Governor of Ceylon Sir Reginald Stubbs in a special ceremony held at Queen’s House, Colombo. The same year also saw Banks’ involvement in the proposed deportation of Mark Anthony Bracegirdle, an Anglo-Australian Marxist activist, investigated by a Commission of Inquiry. As a result of this much publicised case the Foreign Office transferred him to Ethiopia in 1942, as Commissioner of Police, where he was responsible for re-establishing the Ethiopian police force. In July 1949 Banks was awarded the Officer of the Order of the Star of Ethiopia by the Emperor of Ethiopia Haile Selassie. In September 1956 Banks retired and was replaced by General Tsige Dibu. In July 1959 he was awarded the Commander of the Star of Ethiopia.

Police appointments
Preceded by Herbert Dowbiggin	Inspector General of Police; 1937–1942	Succeeded by Gordon Halland
