= T. E. Anandaraja =

Thangarajah Edward Anandaraja

27th Inspector General of Police (Sri Lanka)
- In office 1 October 2002 – 14 October 2003
- Preceded by: Lakdasa Kodituwakku
- Succeeded by: Indra de Silva

Commissioner, Human Rights Commission of Sri Lanka
- In office February 2011 – 21 October 2015

Thangarajah Edward Anandaraja was Sri Lanka's 27th Inspector-General of Police and a former Commissioner, Human Rights Commission of Sri Lanka.

After graduating from the Peradeniya University in 1966, he joined the police service and served as Assistant Superintendent, Superintendent and Senior Superintendent in Police Districts and Divisions in Elpitiya, Monaragala, Jaffna, Kelaniya, Colombo, Tangalle and Trincomalee.

Following the death of the Inspector General of Police Lakdasa Kodituwakku on 27 August 2002 Anandaraja was appointed acting IGP. He was officially appointed to the role on 1 October 2002. He was forced to resign from the position on 14 October 2003, as a result of an investigation that in March 2002 he attended the birthday party of a notorious drug dealer's infant daughter.

In addition to his B.A from Peradeniya University he has obtained LL.B from the Open University of Sri Lanka, Masters in Public Administration from the Sri Jayawardanepura University of Sri Lanka, Attorney-at-Law from the Law College and took his oaths as Attorney-at-Law of the Supreme Court of Sri Lanka in 2005.

In February 2011 he was appointed a Commissioner on the Human Rights Commission of Sri Lanka, a position on which he served until 21 October 2015.

== See also ==
- Inspector Generals of Police

Police appointments
Preceded by Lakdasa Kodituwakku	Inspector General of Police; 2002–2003	Succeeded by Indra de Silva
