= Jayantha Wickramarathne =

31st Sri Lankan Inspector General of Police
- In office 1 July 2008 – 2 November 2009
- Preceded by: Victor Perera
- Succeeded by: Mahinda Balasuriya

Personal details
- Spouse: Anoma Goonetilleke
- Education: Thurstan College; University of Sri Jayewardenepura
- Profession: Police officer

Jayantha Wickramarathne was the 31st Sri Lankan Inspector-General of Police.

Educated at Thurstan College, Colombo Wickramarathne gained a second class honours degree in Public Administration at the University of Sri Jayewardenepura and later joined the Sri Lanka Police as a Probationary Assistant Superintendent. He retired in November 2009 after thirty-four years in the Police and was awarded the Purna Bhumi Padakkama medal and Sri Lanka Police award for excellent service.

In July 2016 Wickramarathne was questioned by police in connection with the January 2009 murder of Lasantha Wickrematunge, the editor of The Sunday Leader.
