= Cyril Longden =

6th British Inspector- General of Police in Ceylon

Cyril Chapman Longden KPM

6th Inspector General of Police (Sri Lanka)
- Preceded by: Albert Walter De Wilton
- Succeeded by: Ivor Edward David

Personal details
- Born: Cyril Chapman Longden; 1 November 1873 Saint Kitts, West Indies
- Died: 22 February 1913 (aged 39)
- Parent(s): Sir James Robert Longden, Alice Emily née Berridge
- Profession: Colonial administrator

Cyril Chapman Longden, KPM, (1873–1913) was the sixth British colonial Inspector-General of Police in Ceylon (Sri Lanka).

Longden was born on 1 November 1873, the fourth child and second son of Sir James Robert Longden (1827–1891) and Alice Emily née Berridge (1846–1910). Sir James Longden was the Governor of Trinidad between 1870 and 1874, the Governor of British Guiana between 1874 and 1876, and the Governor of Ceylon until 1883.

Longden was the District Superintendent of Police, Madras Police.

In 1905 the position of Inspector-General of Police and Prisons in Ceylon, was separated into two posts with the incumbent Major Albert Walter De Wilton continuing in the Prisons role and Longden, on loan from India, appointed Inspector General of Police of Ceylon. Longden was instrumental in establishing a Police Training School for new recruits and a Criminal Investigation Department.

In 1910 Ivor Edward David was appointed Inspector General of Police and Longden returned to his position in Madras.

In 1911 he was awarded the King's Police Medal, whilst he was the District Superintendent of Police, Indian Police, Madras.

He died unmarried on 22 February 1913 in South Kensington, London, leaving effects of nearly 5,000 pounds (worth about 437,000 pounds in 2015).

Police appointments
Preceded by Albert Walter De Wilton	Inspector General of Police; 1905–1910	Succeeded by Ivor Edward David
