= Victor Gunasekara =

Major Victor Gunasekara

Former Controller of Imports Exports

Military service
- Allegiance: Ceylon
- Branch/service: Ceylon Army Volunteer Force
- Years of service: (1949-1962)
- Rank: Major
- Unit: Ceylon Artillery

Major Victor Joseph Harold Gunasekera, CCS (1921 — 1993) was a former Ceylonese civil servant. The former Controller of Imports Exports, Government Agent of Kegalle and Secretary to the Board of Control for Cricket. A reservist, he was a Major in the Ceylon Artillery and was one of the accused of the attempted military coup of 1962.

Educated at the Royal College, Colombo, where he played for the Royal–Thomian and at Ceylon University College. He joined the Ceylon Civil Service and went on to serve as Assistant Government Agent in Galle, Hambantota & Kandy and was the Assistant Secretary in the Ministry of External Affairs and Defence. He was instrumental in initiating the Maldive independence.

Thereafter he served as He was Government Agent, Kegalle before taking up the post of Controller of Imports Exports. Since the formation of the Ceylon Army he joined as a volunteer (reservist) in the 2nd Volunteer Coastal Artillery / Anti-Aircraft Regiment of the Ceylon Artillery. He was mobilized in 1958 due to the Galoya riots and was deployed to Jafna. In 1962, he was accused of taking part in the attempted military coup, arrested and tried. Later all convictions were over turned by the privy council.
