= Frank de Silva =

24th Sri Lankan Inspector General of Police
- In office 29 November 1993 – 31 July 1995
- Preceded by: Ernest Perera
- Succeeded by: Wickremasinghe Rajaguru

Personal details
- Born: Trevor Percival Francis de Silva; 31 July 1935 (age 91)
- Education: University of Ceylon; University of Colombo; University of Sri Jayewardenepura; Police Staff College, Bramshill
- Profession: Police officer, public servant

Trevor Percival Frank de Silva (born 31 July 1935) was the 24th Inspector General of the Sri Lanka Police (IGP) (1993–1995).

He obtained a BA (Hons) from the University of Ceylon, a LL.B from the University of Colombo and a PhD from the University of Sri Jayewardenepura. He is also a graduate of the Police Staff College, Bramshill in the United Kingdom.

He served as the Asian expert on the United Nations Committee on Crime Prevention and Criminal Justice between 1986 and 1992.

De Silva, was appointed IGP by President D. B. Wijetunga on 29 November 1993, succeeding Ernest Perera. De Silva was responsible for re-establishing the Special Branch in 1995, after it had been disbanded in 1970. He retired at 60 on 31 July 1995 and was replaced by Wickremasinghe Rajaguru.

He authored a book, Police Decision in Action: A Profile in Legal Review, which was published in February 2009.

In November 2003 he was appointed a member of the Presidential Commission on Maintenance of Law and Order. The commission was appointed by President Chandrika Kumaratunga to investigate into whether there was a significant increase in crime in Sri Lanka, over the preceding twenty years, affecting the maintenance of law and order in the country.

In May 2015 he was appointed a member to the National Police Commission.

== Bibliography ==
- De Silva, Frank (2009). Police Decision in Action: A Profile in Legal Review. Stamford Lake. ISBN 9789556581447.

Police appointments
Preceded by Ernest Perera	Inspector General of Police; 1993–1995	Succeeded by Wickremasinghe Rajaguru
