= Victor Perera =

Sri Lankan police officer (died 2023)

1st Governor of Northern Province
- In office 3 July 2008 – 10 October 2008
- Preceded by: Mohan Wijewickrama (as acting)
- Succeeded by: Dickson Sarathchandra Dela

30th Sri Lankan Inspector General of Police
- In office 12 October 2006 – 1 July 2008
- Preceded by: Chandra Fernando
- Succeeded by: Jayantha Wickramarathne

Personal details
- Born: 1947/1948 Ceylon
- Died: 16 October 2023 (aged 75)
- Profession: Police officer

Victor Perera (1947/1948 – 16 October 2023) was a Sri Lankan police officer who was the first Governor of Northern Province and Inspector General of Police.

== Police career ==
Perera joined the Sri Lanka Police Service in 1974 as an Assistant Superintendent of Police. Serving as the most senior Deputy Inspector General of Police he was promoted as the 30th Inspector General Police on 12 October 2006 and retired from service on 3 June 2008. He was succeeded by the senior Deputy Inspector General of Police Jayantha Wickramarathne.

== Political career ==
With the division of the North Eastern Province in 2007 Perera was appointed, by President Mahinda Rajapakse, as the first Governor of Northern Province, succeeding acting governor Rear Admiral Mohan Wijewickrema. Perera was the first former head of the police to have been appointed a Governor to a province.

== Death ==
Victor Perera died on 16 October 2023, at the age of 75.

== See also ==
- Inspector General of Police (Sri Lanka)
- Sri Lanka Police Service

Police appointments
Preceded by Chandra Fernando	Sri Lankan Inspector General of Police; 2006–2008	Succeeded by Jayantha Wickramarathne
Political offices
Preceded by Mohan Wijewickrama (as Acting Governor)	Governor of Northern Province; 2008	Succeeded by Dickson Sarathchandra Dela
