= Louis Knollys =

Louis Frederic Knollys CMG
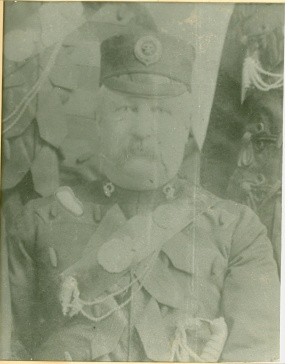

4th Inspector General of Police
- Preceded by: William Robert Campbell
- Succeeded by: Albert Walter De Wilton

Personal details
- Born: 26 February 1847
- Died: 15 December 1922 (aged 75) Ross-on-Wye, Herefordshire, England
- Parent(s): Rev. Canon William Frederick Ernest Knollys, Caroline Augusta née North
- Profession: Colonial administrator

Major Louis Frederick Knollys, CMG (1847–1922) was the fourth British colonial Inspector-General of Police in Ceylon (Sri Lanka).

Knollys was born on 26 February 1847, the third son of Rev. Canon William Frederick Ernest Knollys and Caroline Augusta née North. He was educated at Radley College, and Marlborough.

Knollys enlisted in the 32nd (Cornwall) Regiment of Foot in 1866 and in September 1868 was made a Lieutenant.

In 1872 he was appointed the aide-de-camp to the Governor of Mauritius Arthur Hamilton-Gordon, and continued as Hamilton-Gordon's aide-de-camp when he was transferred to become Governor of Fiji in 1875. In 1876 he commanded an expedition into the mountains of Fiji, where he suppressed an uprising amongst the local tribes in The Little War, receiving a promotion to captain. Knollys was subsequently created a Companion in the Order of St Michael and St George in "recognition of his distinguished services in quelling recent disturbances in the Island of Fiji." In 1877 he was appointed Commandant of the Armed Native Constabulary in Fiji. In 1880 when Hamilton-Gordon was appointed Governor of New Zealand and subsequently in 1883 when he was made Governor of Ceylon, Knollys continued in his role as his aide-de-camp. He was made a Major in the Cameronians (Scottish Rifles) in 1881. Knollys was appointed Inspector-General of Police and Prisons in Jamaica in 1886 and Inspector-General of Police and Prisons in Ceylon in 1891. In 1899 he became a member of the Legislative Council, Ceylon. Knollys retired in 1902 and died at Ross-on-Wye, Herefordshire, England on 15 December 1922.

Police appointments
Preceded by William Robert Campbell	Inspector General of Police; 1891–1901	Succeeded by Albert Walter De Wilton
