= D. W. J. Perera =

Sri Lankan teacher and senator

D. W. J. Perera was a Ceylonese Sinhalese teacher and member of the Senate of Ceylon.

Educated at Sri Sumangala College, Panadura, Perera became a mathematics master at Ananda College under Principal P. de S. Kularatne. Following Kularatne's retirement from Ananda College and subsequent appointment as Manager of the Buddhist Theosophical Society (BTS) Schools, Perera followed and joined the staff at Sri Sumangala College which was administrated by the Buddhist Theosophical Society (BTS) in 1944.

A longstanding member of Lanka Sama Samaja Party, he was nominated by the Bolshevik–Leninist Party of India, Ceylon and Burma and elected to the Senate of Ceylon in 1947.
