= Wickremasinghe Rajaguru =

Former Sri Lanka Police Inspector General

W. B. Rajaguru

25th Inspector General of Police (Sri Lanka)
- In office 29 July 1995 – 31 August 1998
- Preceded by: Frank de Silva
- Succeeded by: Lakdasa Kodituwakku

Personal details
- Born: Wickremasinghe B. Rajaguru; 31 August 1938 (age 88)
- Education: St. Anthony's College, Kandy
- Profession: Police officer

Wickremasinghe B. Rajaguru (born 31 August 1938) was the 25th Inspector General of the Sri Lanka Police (IGP) (1995–1998).

Rajaguru attended St. Anthony's College, Kandy.

In 1993 he was forcibly retired at the age of 55 but following the election of the People's Alliance government at the 1994 parliamentary elections they granted the option for senior police officers who had faced potential political victimisation to appeal and request to be re-instated with back-wages. Rajaguru was one of the six officers reinstated and placed in the rank of Senior DIG.

He was appointed IGP on 29 July 1995. In 1996 he established the Central Anti Vice Striking Force (CAVSF), a police division whose focus was stopping public-order crimes like gambling, narcotics, prostitution, and illegal sales of alcohol.

On 7 December 1996 an American-built Bell 212 air force helicopter carrying Sri Lanka’s Deputy Defence Minister, Anuruddha Ratwatte, Army Commander, Rohan Daluwatte and Rajaguru crashed several miles north of the Weli Oya army base in Liberation Tigers of Tamil Eelam-held jungle of northern Sri Lanka. The officers trekked 5 km (3.1 mi) before being found by commandos sent to rescue them.

Rajaguru retired from the police service on 31 August 1998. He was succeeded by Lakdasa Kodituwakku.

== Bibliography ==
- Rajaguru, W. B. (1977). Sri Lanka Police Service. Center for the Study of Crime, Delinquency, and Corrections, Southern Illinois University.

Police appointments
Preceded by Frank de Silva	Inspector General of Police; 1995–1998	Succeeded by Lakdasa Kodituwakku
