= Aleric Abeygunawardena =

Aleric Abeygunawardene

17th Inspector General of Police (Sri Lanka)
- In office 8 July 1967 – 13 September 1970
- Preceded by: John Attygalle
- Succeeded by: Stanley Senanayake

Personal details
- Born: Aleric Lanty Abeygunawardena
- Died: 1998
- Spouse: Kate née de Fonseka
- Children: Manolal, Nelum, Kumar, Anoja
- Profession: Police officer

Aleric Lanty Abeygunawardena (1905-1998) was a Sri Lankan Inspector General Police (IGP) (1967–1970).

Abeygunawardena had his Primary and Secondary Education at Richmond College, Galle before he entered S. Thomas' College, Mount Lavinia and joined the Ceylon Police Force on 28 September 1931 as a Sub-Inspector of Police. In May 1950 he was promoted to Assistant Superintendent of Police (ASP) and served as ASP Galle and ASP Kalutara.

On 8 July 1967 he was appointed the Inspector General Police, succeeding John Attygalle following his retirement, and served in that position until 13 September 1970.

Abeygunawardena then served as an Additional Secretary of the Ministry of External Affairs and Defence during the 1971 JVP Insurrection, leading the investigation into the insurrection.

He married Kate de Fonseka and they had four daughters.

Police appointments
Preceded by John Attygalle	Inspector General of Police; 1967–1970	Succeeded by Stanley Senanayake
