= Albert De Wilton =

British colonial administrator (1862–1931)

Major Albert De Wilton

5th Inspector General of Police
- In office 17 August 1902 – 1905
- Preceded by: Louis Frederic Knollys
- Succeeded by: Cyril Chapman Longden

Personal details
- Born: Albert Walter De Wilton; 1862 Samalkota, India
- Died: 13 October 1931 (aged 68–69) Jersey
- Resting place: St. Peter’s Church, Jersey
- Spouse: Julie Helen née Gatmell (1863–1893) m.1887, Marie Ellen née Phillips (1864–?) m.1894
- Children: Albert Gordon St John Montefiore (b.1891); Marie Laura Patricia (b.1897), Norah Ernestine Pascal (1902-1973))
- Parent(s): Jacob Wilkins, Judith Laura née Montefiore
- Profession: Colonial administrator

Major Albert Walter De Wilton (1862 – 13 October 1931) was the fifth British colonial Inspector-General of Police in Ceylon (Sri Lanka).

== Biography ==
Wilton was born in 1862, in Samalkota, the second son of Dr Jacob Wilkins (1830-1879) and Judith Laura née Montefiore (1835-1899). He received his early education at Brighton and Southsea Military College, where he graduated in 1880. He joined the militia the following year, attending Royal Military Academy Sandhurst, obtaining his commission in 1883 as a Lieutenant in the Connaught Rangers. He saw active service in the Burma Campaigns of 1885, 1887 and 1889 and was awarded a medal and two clasps.

In 1898, he was appointed Major-General of Police in Mauritius. In 1902, he was transferred to Ceylon, assuming the position of Inspector-General of Police and Prisons on 17 August 1902. In 1905 due to the increase in workload the position was separated into two posts with De Wilton continuing in the role of Inspector-General of Prisons and Superintendent of Convict Establishments and Cyril Longden, the Superintendent of Police in Madras was transferred to take on the role of Inspector General of Police. He retired in 1922. He died on 13 October 1931, aged 69, in Jersey.

Police appointments
Preceded by Louis Frederic Knollys	Inspector General of Police; 1891–1901	Succeeded by Cyril Chapman Longden
