= Gordon Halland =

British police officer

Colonel Gordon Halland OBE, CIE, MID

10th Inspector General of Police (Sri Lanka)
- In office 1942–1944
- Preceded by: Philip Norton Banks
- Succeeded by: Ranulph Bacon

Personal details
- Born: Gordon Herbert Ramsay Halland; 13 April 1888 Witham on the Hill, Lincolnshire, England
- Died: 28 March 1981 (aged 92) Minchinhampton, Gloucestershire, England
- Profession: Police officer

Gordon Herbert Ramsay Halland (13 April 1888 – 28 March 1981) was a career British police officer, who served in India, Ireland, UK, Sri Lanka and Germany.

== Life ==
=== Early life ===
Halland was born on 13 April 1888, at the vicarage in Witham on the Hill, Lincolnshire, the eldest son of Rev. John Thomas Halland (1857–1941), the vicar of Witham on the Hill and subsequently the rector of Blyborough, Lincolnshire, and Amy née Ramsay (1857–1939). Halland was privately educated and attended the Royal Latin School in Buckingham. In 1906 he was employed as a science master at Kirton Grammar School, Lincolnshire.

=== India ===
In 1908 he joined the Indian Imperial Police and served in the Punjab, where he was second in command of the policing operation for the 1911 Delhi Durbar, and by 1914 reached the rank of District Superintendent.

In 1915 Halland was seconded to the Indian army's general staff as an intelligence officer, with the task of countering subversion in the Sikh regiments of the Indian army. In 1916 he married Helen Claudine Blanche, daughter of Major-General John McNeill Walter, adjutant-general in India. In 1918 he was promoted to Major and awarded an OBE.

In 1920, whilst home on leave Halland was 'lent' by the India Office to help the fight against the Irish Republican Army during the Irish War of Independence. On returning to India at the start of 1921 he was appointed the commandant of the police training academy at Phillaur. In 1926 Halland was promoted to Superintendent of the Amritsar district. The following year he was sent to Shanghai, to protect the international settlement there. Halland returned to the army with the rank of lieutenant-colonel, before returning to India as senior superintendent in charge of Delhi.

During his time in India, Halland played two first-class matches for the Europeans cricket team.

=== UK ===
In October 1931 he retired from the Indian police (receiving a Companion of the Order of the Indian Empire, with the honorary rank of colonel) to take up the post, at the age of forty-three, of chief constable for the Lincolnshire Police.

In 1933 the Commissioner of the Metropolitan Police, Lord Trenchard, selected Halland to be the first commandant of the new Hendon Police College, a position he served in from 1934 until 1938. In August 1938 he was appointed Inspector of Constabulary for southern England and almost immediately was preoccupied with the preparations for wartime police duties, which accelerated with the Munich crisis the next month.

=== Ceylon and Germany ===
In October 1942 Halland was sent to Ceylon as the Inspector-General of Police to reorganise the country's police force but he was forced to resign in the spring of 1944 due to a deteriorating relationship with the Minister for Home Affairs, Arunachalam Mahadeva. Despite his limited tenure his restructuring plan was successfully implemented.

In September 1944 the Home Office recommended he be appointed the director of public safety for the Allied Control Council for Germany, responsible for setting up and restructuring the country's police force. He served in Germany as inspector-general of public safety. It was during this time his wife suddenly died. In 1947 he was replaced as head by his deputy, Michael Sylvester O'Rourke, later head of police in Kenya and then from 1950 Palestine.

=== Final roles ===
After leaving Germany, Halland returned to his previous role as Inspector of Constabulary. Later that year he married Baroness Sigrid von der Recke, née von Lutzau (1909–1996), of Windau, Latvia. Halland retired as Inspector of Constabulary in 1954, after which he served as a councillor in Lincolnshire County Council until 1957. Halland died on 28 March 1981 at Minchinhampton, Gloucestershire.
