= A. W. H. Abeyesundere =

Sri Lankan judge

A. W. H. Abeyesundere QC
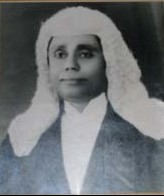
- Born: May 4, 1906; Hikkaduwa
- Died: January 31, 1988 (aged 81)
- Education: St. Joseph's College, Colombo; University of London (B.A)
- Occupation: Lawyer
- Known for: Attorney General of Sri Lanka, Judge of the Supreme Court of Sri Lanka

A. W. H. Abeyesundere, QC was a Sri Lankan lawyer, independence activist, former acting Attorney General of Sri Lanka and judge of the Supreme Court of Sri Lanka.

== Roots and lineage ==
A.W.H. Abeyesundere was born on 4 May 1906 in the southern Sri Lanka town of Hikkaduwa, the youngest in a family of seven. His father was a proprietary planter, and his mother was a homemaker. Just three of his siblings survived to adulthood, including Dr. E.R. Abeyesundere, a Fellow of the Royal College of Surgeons, and A.C.L. Abeyesundere, a proctor.

He traced his lineage on his father's side to Yathramulle Muhandiram from the Dutch era (c. 1669), who was a building contractor awarded the title of Muhandiram by the Dutch for constructing the Dutch fort in Galle using his many elephants. On his mother's side he was a direct descendant of General Wickremasinghe (Wicramasinghe Maha Senevi, who was later poisoned by the king), who was the army commander of King Keerthi Sri Rajasinghe (1580–1593) of Seethawaka, to whom former Sri Lankan President Ranil Wickremasinghe also traces his roots.

== Education and politics ==
Abeyesundere was educated at St. Joseph's College, Colombo, where he excelled in his studies. He had the unique distinction of coming first in the entire British Commonwealth in English, Latin and Greek at both the Junior Cambridge Examination as well as the Senior Cambridge Examination and won a scholarship to University. He read western classics and economics for a Bachelor of Arts degree from the University of London.

Soon after, while still a student at the Ceylon Law College, he became political aide cum private secretary to D.S. Senanayake later Sri Lanka's first Prime Minister . At Law College he came first at the final examination in all three years and passed out with distinction as an Advocate of the Ceylon Supreme Court.

Meanwhile he was in the thick of pre-independence politics as Joint Secretary of the Lanka Mahajana Sabha with the late S.W.R.D. Bandaranaike who later became Sri Lanka's 4th Prime Minister. He was also Secretary of the Ceylon National Congress which was modelled on the lines of the Indian National Congress that was fighting for independence from British rule. As a staunch Buddhist he was very active in Buddhist affairs and was Vice-President of the All Ceylon Buddhist Congress. He was the person who introduced Dudley Senanayake (who became Sri Lanka's 2nd Prime Minister) to the public at his first political meeting. Until joining public service he played an active role in pre-independence politics with his intimate friends Prime Minister S.W.R.D. Bandaranaike and President Junius Richard Jayewardene.

== Legal career ==
Abeyesundere joined Public Service as an Assistant Legal Draftsman in the late 1940s and rose to be Legal Draftsmen in the mid-1950s. Whilst holding that office he had the unique distinction of being conferred silk and appointed a Queen's Counsel which was the first and last time a holder of the office was appointed a Queen's Counsel. When the first World Bank loan to Sri Lanka was being negotiated for the Aberdean – Laksapana Power Project in 1954, the World Bank team that came to Sri Lanka insisted that Mr. Abeyesundere, who was Legal Draftsman at the time, be sent to Washington for the negotiations instead of the incumbent Attorney General. During the communal riots in 1958, he was appointed legal advisor to Sir Oliver Goonetilleke Governor General of Ceylon and attached to Queen's House. It was during this time that he was also made a Justice of the Peace to facilitate his functions in assisting the Governor.

He concurrently held the office of Bribery Commissioner in addition to that of Legal Draftsman and also acted as Attorney General of Sri Lanka; a record unparalleled where a single individual held all three offices at the same time. During his tenure as Attorney General he was responsible for indicting the assassin and co-conspirators who assassinated Prime Minister S.W.R.D. Bandaranaike and also for introducing the use of Sinhala in the Supreme Court for the first time. While Attorney-General he was also involved in the investigation into the attempted military coup in 1962 against the government by senior members of the military.

He was subsequently elevated as a judge of the Supreme Court of Sri Lanka. He had the unique distinction while a Supreme Court Judge of not having a single of his judgments overturned by the Privy Council on Appeal. He retired as a Senior Puisne Justice.

== Post retirement career ==
Following his retirement from the Supreme Court, he was appointed by the Commonwealth Secretariat in London to be Head of the Institute of Legislative Drafting for the entire East and Southern African Region situated in Lusaka, Zambia. On his return to Sri Lanka after a period in London, he was appointed as Chairman of the Committee to suggest changes to the Sri Lanka Administrative Service. He served on many committees and in many organisations, both in an official capacity as well as a personal one, during his long career.

== Death ==
He died in 1988 after a brief illness at age 81 leaving behind his wife Sumana, who subsequently died in 1990, and a son Dr. Sunil Abeyesundere, daughter-in-law Supipi (née Wijeratne) and grandchildren Nilipi and Asanka all presently in the USA
