= Ivor Edward David =

British colonial Inspector-General of Police in Ceylon

7th Inspector General of Police (Sri Lanka)
- In office 1910–1913
- Preceded by: Cyril Longden
- Succeeded by: Herbert Dowbiggin

Personal details
- Born: Ivor Edward David; 6 April 1875 Llandaff, Glamorgan, Wales
- Died: 23 November 1913 (aged 38) Colombo, Ceylon
- Spouse: Beatrice Emma Norah
- Profession: Police officer

Ivor Edward David (6 April 1875 - 23 November 1913) was the seventh British colonial Inspector-General of Police in Ceylon (1910-1913).

Ivor Edward David was born 6 April 1875 in Llandaff, Glamorgan, Wales.

David joined the Indian Police Service having passed the Civil Service Examination, where he served in Mysore, Bangalore and Madras.

In 1910 when Cyril Longden's contract as Inspector-General of Police of Ceylon expired the Colonial government first considered appointing Herbert Dowbiggin but he was determined as being too young for the position. The government instead chose to appoint David, the District Superintendent of Police in Madras, as the new Inspector-General of Police in Ceylon.

During his tenure David is noted for establishing the Police sports grounds in Bambalapitiya in 1912. David died unexpectedly on 23 November 1913 in Colombo, Ceylon at the age of 38. His position as Inspector-General of Police was filled by Dowbiggin.

Police appointments
Preceded by Cyril Chapman Longden	Inspector General of Police; 1910–1913	Succeeded by Herbert Layard Dowbiggin
