= Lakdasa Kodituwakku =

Sri Lankan Inspector General of Police (1941–2002)

Lakdasa 'Lucky' Kodituwakku

26th Inspector General of Police (Sri Lanka)
- In office 1 September 1998 – 27 August 2002
- Preceded by: Wickremasinghe B. Rajaguru
- Succeeded by: Thangarajah Edward Anandaraja

Personal details
- Born: Benjamin Lakdasa Victor de Silva Kodituwakku; 7 January 1941
- Died: 27 August 2002 (aged 61) Colombo, Sri Lanka
- Resting place: Kanatte Cemetery, Borella
- Spouse(s): Lakshmi Sushila Naomi née de Alwis (b. --, d. 24 May 2014)
- Children: Ranmal
- Profession: Police officer

Benjamin Lakdasa 'Lucky' Victor de Silva Kodituwakku (7 January 1941 – 27 August 2002) was Sri Lanka's 26th Inspector General of Police.

Kodituwakku was born on 7 January 1941, the son of Benjamin and Brenda de Silva Kodituwakku. He received his primary school education at S. Thomas' College, Bandarawela, before attending St. Thomas' College, Matale. He also studied at St. Joseph's College, Colombo. He graduated from University of Peradeniya before proceeding to V O C College, Tuticorin Madras University to obtain his Bachelor of Commerce degree in April 1964.

Kodituwakku joined the police force as a probationary Assistant Superintendent of Police (ASP) on 1 November 1966. He served in Nugegoda, Anuradhapura, Colombo, Trincomalee, Chilaw, Negombo and Kalutara and as Assistant Director, Police Training College, Polonnaruwa, Kilinochchi and Kelaniya and at the Prime Minister's Security Division. On 1 January 1981 he was promoted to Senior Superintendent of Police but was subsequently forced to leave the service for political reasons in 1984. Following his resignation he worked as a security consultant.

In 1994 he re-joined the service and on 1 October 1997 was promoted to Deputy Inspector General and Senior DIG on 2 August 1998.

He was a Senior Deputy Inspector General (SDIG) Range One before he was appointed the Inspector General of Police on 1 September 1998, succeeding Wickremasinghe Rajaguru following his retirement on 31 August 1998. Kodituwakku's appointment was controversial, in that he was selected over five other SDIGs, with greater seniority. His selection, it is alleged, was influenced by the ruling People's Alliance party.

Kodituwakku, whilst he was the Inspector General, initiated a programme to provide training to all police personnel on law, public relations and protection of human rights. He also established the Colombo Crime Division.

When he turned sixty Kodituwakku lodged his retirement papers however President Chandrika Kumaratunga urged him to extend his service for an additional year, which he did.

Kodituwakku died on 27 August 2002 at his official residence in Colombo. He is the only IGP to have died while in office and was due to retire on 15 September.

He was married to Lakshmi Sushila Naomi née de Alwis and they had one son, Ranmal, who also served in the police force as a Deputy Inspector General of Police. A week after his funeral thieves dug up his grave at the General Cemetery in Borella and stole his coffin.

Police appointments
Preceded by Wickremasinghe Rajaguru	Inspector General of Police; 1998–2002	Succeeded by T. E. Anandaraja
