= Mahinda Balasuriya =

32nd Inspector General of the Sri Lanka Police (1953–2021)

32nd Sri Lankan Inspector General of Police
- In office 3 November 2009 – 1 June 2011
- Preceded by: Jayantha Wickramarathne
- Succeeded by: Nugagaha Kapalle Illangakoon

Personal details
- Born: 18 June 1953
- Died: 29 April 2021 (aged 67)
- Education: Ananda College; University of Peradeniya; Saint Petersburg State University
- Profession: Police officer, public servant

Dr. Mahinda Balasuriya (18 June 1953 – 29 April 2021) was the 32nd Inspector General of the Sri Lanka Police (IGP) (2009–2011).

Balasuriya was educated at Ananda College, Colombo, before obtaining a BSc. in Chemistry and a M.Phil at the University of Peradeniya.

Balasuriya joined the Police Department on 1 March 1978 as a Probationary Assistant Superintendent of Police, and has held a number of key posts, including those of Senior DIG, Range I and Range III. Balasuriya held the posts of Senior DIG Admin, Ops Command, Transport and Communication and Welfare at the Police Headquarters and was also the pioneer in introducing the 119 Police Emergency Service in Sri Lanka.

He also supervised police coverage of the North and East for three years, and was the Special Task Force (STF) Senior DIG in operations against the LTTE.

On 3 November 2009 he was appointed the Inspector General of Police, succeeding Jayantha Wickramarathne.

In 2010 Balasuriya received a PhD from the Saint Petersburg State University in Russia, for his doctorate on terrorism in Sri Lanka and subject of national security. He subsequently published his doctorate in an abridged, revised form, The Rise and Fall of the LTTE.

On 1 June 2011 Balasuriya resigned as Inspector General of Police following the fatal suppression of a protest by police in the Katunayake Free Trade Zone. It was later reported that Balasuriya had retired, two years before his term was due to expire. In July that year he was appointed the country's ambassador to Brazil. He then served as the ambassador in the United Arab Emirates, before being appointed the Secretary to the Ministry of Law and Order in October 2014.

In July 2016 he was questioned by the Criminal Investigations Department (CID) in connection with the January 2009 murder of journalist Lasantha Wickrematunge and allegations that former Defence Secretary Gotabhaya Rajapaksa ordered the assassination.

In November 2016 he appeared before the Presidential Commission of Inquiry to Investigate and Inquire into Serious Acts of Fraud, Corruption and Abuse of Power, State Resources and Privileges (PRECIFAC), in respect of providing security for National Freedom Front members of parliament during his tenure.

Police appointments
Preceded by Jayantha Wickramarathne	Inspector General of Police; 2009–2011	Succeeded by Nugagaha Kapalle Illangakoon
