= George William Robert Campbell =

British colonial police officer

Sir George William Robert Campbell KCMG

1st & 3rd Inspector General of Police (Sri Lanka)
- In office 3 September 1866 – 1872
- Succeeded by: Frederick Richard Saunders
- In office 1873–1891
- Preceded by: Frederick Richard Saunders
- Succeeded by: Louis Frederic Knollys

Acting Lieutenant-Governor of Penang
- In office 1872–1873
- Preceded by: Arthur Birch
- Succeeded by: Edward Anson

Personal details
- Born: 1835 Campbeltown, Argyll, Scotland
- Died: 10 January 1905 (aged 69–70)
- Spouses: Louisa Georgina Mary née Moyle - (m. 1862; died 1885) Mary Gertrude née Murray; 1853 (m. 1886; div. 1903)
- Children: Elia Louisa Mary (b.1866), Guy (b.1888), Arthur Hamilton Gordon (b.1889), Victoria Mary (b.1892)
- Parent(s): John Campbell, Eliza née Elder
- Profession: Colonial administrator

Sir George William Robert Campbell KCMG (1835–1905) was the first British colonial Inspector General of Police of British Ceylon.

Campbell was born in 1835 in Campbeltown, Argyll, Scotland, the son of John Campbell and Eliza née Elder. He enlisted in the Argyll and Bute Militia and served in India, where he was appointed assistant superintendent in the revenue survey. During the Indian Rebellion of 1857 he was adjutant of the Ahmedabad Koli Corps, Assistant-Superintendent of Police and Assistant Magistrate. After serving as chief of police in the Indian province of Ratnagiri, he was appointed by Governor Frederick North on 3 September 1866, as Chief Superintendent of Police in Ceylon, in charge of the Police Force. Therefore, 3 September 1866 is considered as the beginning of Sri Lanka Police Service. The post was changed to Inspector General of Police in 1867. In 1872 he was appointed Acting Lieutenant-Governor of Penang, Malaysia, a position he served for one year before returning to his role as Inspector General of Police. In 1887 he was awarded the CMG. In 1891 he retired and returned to England, where he received a knighthood for his service. Campbell died on 10 January 1905.

Police appointments
Preceded by	Inspector General of Police; 1866–1872	Succeeded by Frederick Richard Saunders
Preceded by Frederick Richard Saunders	Inspector General of Police; 1873–1891	Succeeded by Louis Frederic Knollys
