= Indra de Silva =

Former police inspector of Sri Lanka

28th Inspector General of Police (Sri Lanka)
- In office 19 December 2003 – 30 September 2004
- Preceded by: Thangarajah Edward Anandaraja
- Succeeded by: Chandra Fernando

Personal details
- Born: 19 February 1944 Ambalangoda, Ceylon
- Died: 30 December 2015 (aged 71) Colombo, Sri Lanka
- Spouse: Wasantha née Wickramarachchi
- Children: Sonali, Lakmini, Chatura, Mahesha
- Profession: Police officer

Indra de Silva (19 February 1944 – 30 December 2015) was the 28th Inspector General of the Sri Lanka Police (IGP) (2003–2004).

De Silva was born on 19 February 1944 in Ambalangoda, received his education at Dharmasoka College, Ambalangoda and attended the University of Peradeniya, where he obtained an honours degree in Geography. He was later invited to be a lecturer in the Geography Faculty at the university.

He joined the Sri Lanka Police as a Trainee Assistant Superintendent of Police on 15 December 1971. De Silva served in several areas, including the North and the East and in 1980, he became a Superintendent of Police (SP) and in 1985 a Senior SP. He was appointed Deputy Inspector General (DIG) in 1992 and promoted to Senior Deputy Inspector General of Police (SDIG) in 2000. His posts included Director Public Relations at Police Headquarters, Deputy Inspector General Administration and Deputy Inspector General Ranges 3.

De Silva was appointed acting Inspector General of Police on 17 October 2003 by President Chandrika Kumaratunga, following the resignation of Thangarajah Edward Anandaraja on 14 October, and his permanent appointment to the position was confirmed by the Constitutional Council on 18 December. He retired on 30 September 2004. On 29 March 2005, he was appointed a member of the Commission to Investigate Allegations of Bribery or Corruption (CIABOC), for a term ending on 28 March 2010.

He married Wasantha Wickramarachchi, and they had four children: Sonali, Lakmini, Chatura and Mahesha.

De Silva died on 30 December 2015, at the age of 71 whilst undergoing treatment at the Police Hospital in Narahenpita, Colombo.

Police appointments
Preceded by T. E. Anandaraja	Inspector General of Police; 2003–2004	Succeeded by Chandra Fernando
