= John Attygalle =

Sri Lankan police officer (1906-1981)

John Wilhelmus Lucius Attygalle

16th Inspector General of Police (Sri Lanka)
- In office 1966–1967
- Preceded by: S. A. Dissanayake
- Succeeded by: Aleric Abeygunawardena

Personal details
- Born: John W. L. Attygalle; 1906
- Died: 23 March 1981 (aged 74–75)

John Wilhelmus Lucius Attygalle (1906–1981) was the 16th Inspector General of the Sri Lanka Police (IGP) (1966–1967).

== Police career ==
Attygalle joined the police force on 1 October 1928 as a Sub-Inspector of Police. In October 1947 he was promoted to Assistant Superintendent of Police (ASP) as ASP Crimes, Colombo (South) and thereafter was appointed ASP, CID in November 1948; ASP, Ambalangoda January 1950; June 1951 ASP, Colombo Crimes; April 1953 ASP, Western Province (North) and in January 1951 ASP, Jaffna.

In January 1962 Attygalle, who was then the Superintendent of Police of the Criminal Investigation Department (CID), played a major role in stopping the attempted military coup. Attygalle together with Felix Dias Bandaranaike and S. A. Dissanayake (Deputy Inspector General of the CID) informed Prime Minister Sirimavo Bandaranaike at her residence about the attempt to take over the Government by a coup by certain army, navy and police personnel, on the eve of the coup, which resulted in its failure to occur and the arrest of the coup organisers. In 1963 following the appointment of Dissanayake as Inspector-General of Police he took on the role of Deputy Inspector General of the CID.

In early 1966 Dissanayake was placed on compulsory leave, he was then replaced by Attygalle as Inspector-General in June that year. In July 1966 he arrested Major General Richard Udugama, the Commander of the Ceylon Army, at the Bandaranaike International Airport for his purported involvement in an alleged coup d'état attempt. Udugama was subsequently found not guilty by the Supreme Court and acquitted of all charges. On 1 October 1966 Attygalle established the Police Public Relations Division at Police Headquarters, Colombo. On 1 April 1967, Attygalle arranged for the Police Training School to be shifted from Kalutara to Echen Square Barracks, which were occupied by the Sinha Regiment of the Ceylon Army. The Police Training School was subsequently relocated back to its original premises in Kalutara in December 1970.

On 8 July 1967 he retired from his position as Inspector-General of Police.

== Later work ==
In 1969 Attygalle, who had been appointed a special security advisor to the Ministry of External Affairs and Defence in July 1967, prepared a report on the potential threat of the communist Janatha Vimukthi Peramuna (JVP) which was presented to the Prime Minister, Dudley Senanayake, for consideration. It is felt that the government's subsequent inaction against the JVP precipitated the JVP insurrection in 1971.

Attygalle died on 23 March 1981 at the age of 75.

Police appointments
Preceded by S. A. Dissanayake	Inspector General of Police; 1966–1967	Succeeded by Aleric Abeygunawardena
