= Priyantha Weerasooriya =

Sri Lankan Inspector General of Police since 2025

37th Inspector General of Police
- Incumbent
- Assumed office 13 August 2025 (Acting: 27 September 2024 – 13 August 2025)
- Appointed by: Anura Kumara Dissanayake
- Preceded by: Deshabandu Tennakoon

Personal details
- Born: Weerasooriya Liyanaarachchige Saman Priyantha Weerasooriya; 9 February 1969 (age 57) Dodangoda, Sri Lanka
- Education: Gnanodaya Maha Vidyalaya, Kalutara: General Sir John Kotelawala Defence University; University of Colombo; Sri Lanka Law College
- Profession: Police officer

Weerasooriya Liyanaarachchige Saman Priyantha Weerasooriya (born 9 February 1969) is a Sri Lankan police officer currently serving as the 37th Inspector General of Police since 13 August 2025. He had previously served in an acting capacity since 27 September 2024. Weerasooriya is the first officer in Sri Lanka to rise from the rank of police constable to its highest position.

== Career ==
Weerasooriya joined the police in 1988 as a constable, serving in the police special task force and traffic and crime divisions between 1988 and 1992. He was promoted to sub inspector in 1992, working in the Maradana, Vavuniya and Kompanjaveediya police stations.

After graduating with a law degree from the University of Colombo in 1997, he was promoted to assistant superintendent of police in 1999. In 2007 he was promoted to the position of superintendent of police, serving as the director of legal and logistics.

Weerasooriya has participated in United Nations peacekeeping missions in East Timor and Haiti. In 2015 he completed his Masters in Law from General Sir John Kotelawala Defence University. He was promoted to the post of deputy inspector general of police, serving as the chief of Police Logistics Division from 2016 to 2020. Weerasooriya was promoted to the position of senior deputy inspector general in 2020, serving in the Strategic Management, Crime and Traffic Division.

Weerasooriya was serving as the senior deputy inspector general in charge of the North Central Province before he was appointed as acting inspector general of police on 27 September 2024 by President Anura Kumara Dissanayake. He replaces Deshabandu Tennakoon, who was suspended from the position on 24 July 2024.

=== Inspector general of police ===
On 11 August 2025, Weerasooriya was nominated by President Dissanayake for appointment as the next inspector general of police following Tennakon's removal from office. His nomination was ratified by the Constitutional Council on 12 August. He was appointed as the 37th Inspector General of Police on 13 August.

Police appointments
| Preceded by Deshabandu Tennakoon | Inspector General of Police; 2025–present | Incumbent |
