= Ananda Wijepala =

Sri Lankan politician

Hon. Ananda Wijepala MP
- ආනන්ද විජේපාල ஆனந்த விஜெபாலா

Minister of Public Security and Parliamentary Affairs
- Incumbent
- Assumed office 18 November 2024
- President: Anura Kumara Dissanayake
- Prime Minister: Harini Amarasuriya
- Preceded by: Vijitha Herath

Member of Parliament for Kurunegala District
- Incumbent
- Assumed office 21 November 2024
- Majority: 133,142 Preferential votes

Personal details
- Party: National People's Power

Ananda Wijepala is a Sri Lankan politician currently serving as the Minister of Public Security and Parliamentary Affairs. He was elected to the Sri Lankan Parliament from Kurunegala Electoral District as a member of the National People's Power.

He previously served as the private secretary to President Anura Kumara Dissanayake and currently serves as his chief of staff.
