= Deshabandu Tennakoon =

Sri Lankan police officer and 36th Inspector General of Police

36th Inspector General of Police
- In office 26 February 2024 – 24 July 2024 (suspended) (Acting: 29 November 2023 – 26 February 2024); Removed from office: 5 August 2025
- Preceded by: C. D. Wickramaratne
- Succeeded by: Priyantha Weerasooriya

Personal details
- Born: 7 March 1971 (age 55)
- Profession: Police officer

Tennakoon Mudiyanselage Wanshalankara Deshabandu Tennakoon, commonly known as Deshabandu Tennakoon (Sinhala: දේශබන්දු තෙන්නකෝන්; born 7 March 1971), is a controversial Sri Lankan police officer who served as the 36th Inspector General of the Sri Lanka Police. Initially appointed acting Inspector General on 29 November 2023, he was appointed to the position in his own right on 26 February 2024, and served until his suspension by the Supreme Court on 24 July 2024.

In March 2025, Tennakoon was reported to have gone missing after the magistrate's court ordered him to be arrested, and currently remains at large. On 5 August 2025, he was officially removed from the office of Inspector General by the Parliament of Sri Lanka.

== Early life and education ==
Deshabandu Tennakoon was born in 1971 and received his school education at Nalanda College, Colombo. Later, after graduating from the University of Colombo with a bachelor's degree he joined the Sri Lanka Police service in 1998. He also holds a masters degree from the University of Kelaniya.

== Police career ==
Tennakoon first joined the Sri Lanka Police in 1998, beginning his career as an apprentice Assistant Superintendent of Police. Prior to his current appointment, Deshabandu served as the Senior Deputy Inspector General of Police (SDIG) in charge of the Western Province.

=== Black Monday attacks ===
During the 2022 Sri Lankan protests, it was reported that Tennakoon had allegedly been present at the two protest sites that came under attack by pro-Rajapaksa counter-protestors on Black Monday.

On 10 May 2022, the day following the attacks, Tennakoon was physically assaulted on the streets of Perahera Mawatha while attempting to leave the Temple Trees in civil clothing before being rescued by policemen and admitted to the hospital.

=== Human rights violations ===
On 14 December 2023, a three judge bench of the Supreme Court of Sri Lanka ruled that Tennakoon and two of his subordinates were guilty of torturing Weheragedara Ranjith Sumangala of Kindelpitiya for an alleged theft and thereby violating his fundamental rights when the men were in uniform attached to the Nugegoda Police Division in 2010. The Fundamental Rights Application (SC/FR 107/2011) was filled by Sumangala in the Supreme Court in March 2011, against the then Superintendent of Police, M. W. D. Tennakoone, Inspector of Police Bhathiya Jayasinghe, then OIC (Emergency Unit) Mirihana, Police Officer Bandara, former Sergeant Major of the Army Ajith Wanasundera of Padukka and several others in the police department. The three bench panel that consisted of Justices S. Thurairaja, Kumudini Wickremasinghe and Priyantha Fernando, directed the National Police Commission and other relevant authorities to take disciplinary action against Tennakoon and two of his subordinates.

== Inspector General of Police ==
On 29 November 2023, President Ranil Wickremesinghe appointed Tennakoon as acting Inspector General of Police, following the resignation of his predecessor C. D. Wickramaratne. He was appointed the permanent Inspector General of Police on 26 February 2024.

On the day of his appointment, Leader of the Opposition Sajith Premadasa claimed that in the Constitutional Council, which oversees high-level appointments, only 4 votes were cast in favour of Tennakoon, while 2 votes were cast against and 2 votes were cast as absentees. Among the votes in favour was Speaker of the Parliament Mahinda Yapa Abeywardena, who can only cast a vote in case of a tie. Premadasa pointed out that this would make the appointment illegal.

Tennakoon was suspended from his position on 24 July 2024.

=== Shooting incident in Weligama and open warrant ===
On 31 December 2023, an operation led by the Colombo Crime Division (CCD) in Weligama resulted in a shooting near the W15 Hotel, during which a police officer was killed. The Matara Magistrate's Court later deemed this operation unauthorised, and on 28 February 2025 issued an open warrant and ordered the arrest of Tennakoon and eight other police officers on charges of conspiracy to commit murder. The court also imposed a travel ban, preventing him from leaving the country during the investigation. As of early March 2025, Tennakoon remains at large, evading arrest despite ongoing efforts by law enforcement, including raids at multiple locations. Authorities have warned that legal action will be taken against anyone assisting him in evading capture.

In response to the arrest warrant, Tennakoon filed a writ petition with the Court of Appeal on 10 March, seeking to prevent his arrest. His legal team requested an interim injunction to stay the arrest warrant issued by the Matara Magistrate's Court. The petition was scheduled for further consideration on 12 March 2025.

On 5 August 2025, Tennakoon was officially removed from office of Inspector General following a resolution passed in the Parliament of Sri Lanka as per Section 17 of the Removal of Officers (Procedure) Act, No. 5 of 2002, with 177 members voting in favour, none against and one abstaining. Priyantha Weerasooriya was appointed as his successor a few days later on 13 August.

Police appointments
| Preceded by C. D. Wickramaratne | Inspector General of Police; 2024 | Succeeded by Priyantha Weerasooriya |
