= Assisted Schools and Training Colleges (Special Provisions) Act No 5 of 1960 =

Act passed in the Parliament of Ceylon

The Assisted Schools and Training Colleges (Special Provisions) Act No 5 of 1960, was an act passed in the Parliament of Ceylon in 1960. The act was passed to enable to government to take over the ownership and management of many private schools and training colleges. Many of the schools that belong to the Catholic Church in Sri Lanka were taken over as well as schools that were run by the Buddhist Theosophical Society.
