= S. A. Dissanayake =

Sri Lankan police officer (1913–1982)

Samuel Arthur Dissanayake

15th Inspector General of Police (Ceylon)
- In office 3 February 1963 – 3 June 1966
- Preceded by: M. Walter F. Abeykoon
- Succeeded by: John Attygalle

Personal details
- Born: 16 September 1913
- Died: 11 March 1982 (aged 68)
- Profession: Police officer

Samuel Arthur "Jingle" Dissanayake(16 September 1913 - 11 March 1982) was a former Sri Lankan Inspector-General of Police. He played a major role as Deputy Inspector-General of Police of the Criminal Investigation Department in stopping the attempted military coup of 1962. Later in 1971 during the 1971 JVP Insurrection he was appointed Additional Secretary of the Ministry of External Affairs and Defence and coordinated military and police operations that crushed the insurrection in two months.

== Education ==
Educated at the Royal College Colombo where he played rugby union at the Bradby Shield Encounter, he went on to study at the University College, Colombo.

== Police career ==
In January 1938, he was appointed by the Governor as a Police Probationer and underwent training at Hendon Police College. Having completed his service examinations, he was appointed Assistant Superintendent of Police, Galle in January 1940 and went on to serve in Tangalle, Galle, Colombo Division (North), Nuwara Eliya, Kurunegala, CID (Technical) and Ports. In January 1950 he was promoted to Superintendent of Police and went on duty leave to Australia. In 1925 he took over as Superintendent of Police Western Province (North). During police service he received the Ceylon Police Medal for Meritorious Service, Defence Medal 1939-45, Ceylon Police Independence Medal and the Service Medal of the Order of St John.

In 1962, he was Deputy Inspector-General of Police, CID and led the counter-coup operation and subsequent investigation to arrest those involved. In April 1963, S. A. Dissanayake succeeded M. Walter F. Abeykoon as IGP. In early 1966, Dissanayake was placed on compulsory leave and was succeeded by John Attygalle as IGP.

== Later work ==
Prime Minister Sirima Bandaranaike appointed Dissanayake as Additional Secretary to the Ministry of External Affairs and Defence in April 1971 when the 1971 JVP Insurrection broke out to coordinated military and police operations.

== Family ==
He was the younger brother of Cyril Dissanayake and his children were Dr Sriani Basanayake, sprinter Dr Nirmala LaBrooy and Surgeon Commodore Lakdasa Dissanayake.

== External links and references ==
- Coup of 1962: an inside story, by former diplomat T. D. S. A. Dissanayaka, son of C.C. "Jungle" Dissanayaka
- Looking back on operation `Holdfast'
- THE QUEEN v. CYRIL CYRUS DISSANAYAKA
- JR’s Kandy March and the tale of ‘Imbulgoda Veeraya’
- How tough cops got over tricky situations, Former DIG Vamadevan recalls police life in old Ceylon
- How to correct the many wrongs in the police

Specific

Police appointments
Preceded by M. Walter F. Abeykoon	Inspector General of Police; 1963–1966	Succeeded by John Attygalle
