= Chandra Fernando (police officer) =

- Police career
- Country: 1971–2006
- Allegiance: Sri Lanka
- Department: Sri Lanka Police Service
- Rank: Inspector-General of Police
- Other work: Presidential Advisor

Chandra Fernando is a former Sri Lankan police officer and was the 29th Inspector-General of Police.

Fernando was educated at St Peter's College, Colombo and at Thurstan College and graduated from the Vidyodaya University with a BA in Modern History. He also gained an LLB from the Open University, Sri Lanka. He joined the Ceylon Police Force as a Probationary Assistant Superintendent of Police in 1971. In February 1991, Fernando was promoted to Deputy Inspector General of Police (DIG). He served as Inspector-General of Police from October 2004 to October 2006.

After retiring from the Police Service he served as Presidential Advisor to President Mahinda Rajapaksa.

Police appointments
Preceded by Indra de Silva	Sri Lankan Inspector General of Police; 2004–2006	Succeeded by Victor Perera
