= Herbert Dowbiggin =

British colonial Inspector General of Police of Ceylon

Sir Herbert Layard Dowbiggin CMG

8th Inspector General of Police (Sri Lanka)
- In office 1913–1937
- Preceded by: Ivor Edward David
- Succeeded by: Philip Norton Banks

Personal details
- Born: 26 December 1880 Ceylon (now Sri Lanka)
- Died: 24 May 1966 (aged 85) Milden, Suffolk
- Profession: Police officer

Sir Herbert Layard Dowbiggin CMG (26 December 1880 – 24 May 1966) was the eighth British colonial Inspector General of Police of Ceylon from 1913 to 1937, the longest tenure of office of an Inspector General of Police (IGP). He was called the 'Father of Colonial Police'. He was knighted in 1931.

== Antecedents ==
Dowbiggin was the sixth child of Rev. Richard Thomas Dowbiggin and Laetitia Anna Layard. His father had translated the Bible into Sinhala, and his younger brother Hugh Blackwell Layard Dowbiggin was born in Ceylon. His maternal grandfather was Sir Charles Peter Layard, the Government Agent of the Western province (after whom Layard's Broadway in Colombo was named) who was himself the grandson of Gualterus Mooyaart, Administrator of Jaffna for the Dutch United East India Company, the VOC. He was a relative of Sir Henry Austen Layard of Nineveh fame and of the naturalist Edgar Leopold Layard.

== Ceylon Police Force ==
Dowbiggin was educated at Merchant Taylors' School and joined the Ceylon Police Force in 1901. He became inspector-general in 1913. During Dowbiggin's tenure of office in Sri Lanka, the strength of the force was enhanced considerably, and the posts of two deputy inspectors general were also created. He oversaw an expansion of the force: the number of police stations increased, so that by 1916 there were 138 all over the island.

He also modernised the force, introducing new techniques of investigation such as fingerprinting and photography and improving the telecommunications network for the police as well as increasing the mobility of the force. The analysis of crime reports became more systematic. He purchased the land on Havelock Road, Colombo, on which the police headquarters and the 'Police Park' playing fields are located.

It was early in his tenure that H.H. Engelbrecht, a member of the Afrikaner diaspora who worked as wildlife officer in Yala, was unjustly jailed in 1914 for having allegedly supplied meat to the German light cruiser SMS Emden.

Due to the riot of 1915 between Sinhalese Buddhists and Muslim Ceylon Moors, he authorized the use of draconian measures, including summary execution, flogging, and imprisonment. Sinhalese leader Anagarika Dharmapala was arrested and had his legs broken in police custody. His younger brothers, Dr. Charles Alwis Hewavhitharana and Edmund Hewavitarne, were also arrested. The latter was subsequently sentenced, in what British Liberal political Phillip Morrel characterized as a miscarriage of justice, to life in penal servitude at Jaffna Prison, where he would die on 19 November 1915 from enteric fever, due to both unsanitary conditions and the lack of necessary medical care within the prison. E. W. Perera, a lawyer from Kotte, braved mine- and submarine-infested seas (as well as the police) along with George E. de Silva to carry a secret memorial initiated and drafted by Sir James Peiris in the soles of his shoes to the Secretary of State for the Colonies, pleading for the repeal of martial law and describing atrocities claimed to have been committed by the police led by Dowbiggin. Dowbiggin was appointed a Companion of the Order of St Michael and St George (CMG) in the 1926 Birthday Honours.

=== Palestine ===
In January 1930, Dowbiggin was sent to Palestine to advise on the re-organisation of the Palestine Police Force, and his report was submitted in May. It was a confidential document which it was considered impossible to publish at the time. On his advice, the British and Palestine Sections of the Police were reinforced, and deployed so that no important Jewish settlement or group of Jewish farms was without a detachment, with access to sealed armouries, furnished with Greener guns. Each colony was provided with a telephone and the road network was improved to give the Police greater mobility.

It is significant that Dowbiggin structured the colonial police force in Palestine as a civilian, rather than a military, force, including the deployment of many police stations in rural areas, based on his experience in Sri Lanka. His successor, Charles Tegart, the former commissioner of the Calcutta Police, recommended the building of highly fortified, military-style Police stations, the so-called 'Tegart forts', in Arab areas.

== Retirement ==
In 1937, he retired from the service. A public meeting was organised on 10 January by a committee, including Mark Anthony Bracegirdle of the Lanka Sama Samaja Party, to condemn 'the bloodstained record' of Dowbiggin as IGP of Ceylon, to mark 'the victims of police brutality and terrorism of 1915' and to condemn 'the betrayal of the Ceylonese nation by Sir Baron Jayatilaka... in attempting to identify the nation with an appreciation of Sir Dowbiggin’s [sic] services.' The popular George E. de Silva presided and A.E. Goonesinha, leader of the Ceylon Labour Party, was a guest speaker. Ten thousand people attended the meeting, held at Galle Face Green. He died in Suffolk, England on 24 May 1966.

== See also ==
- Charles Tegart, British colonial policeman

Police appointments
Preceded by Ivor Edward David	Inspector General of Police; 1913–1937	Succeeded by Philip Norton Banks
