= Osmund de Silva =

Ceylonese police officer

Osmund de Silva OBE

13th Inspector General of Police (Ceylon)
- In office 26 July 1955 – 24 April 1959
- Preceded by: Richard Aluwihare
- Succeeded by: M. Walter F. Abeykoon

Personal details
- Born: c.1901 Ambalangoda, Sri Lanka
- Died: c. 1980
- Spouse: Ena née Aluwihare
- Profession: Police officer

Santiago Wilson Osmund De Silva OBE (25 December 1909 - c. 1980) was Ceylonese police officer. He was the thirteenth and the first Ceylonese career police officer to become Inspector-General of Police (1955–1959).

== Early life and education ==
Santiago Wilson Osmund De Silva was born on 25 December 1909 the son of Mudliyar Thomas de Silva, founding principal of Dharmasoka College. He was educated at S. Thomas' College, Mount Lavinia and University College, Colombo,

== Police career ==
De Silva joined the Ceylon Police Force as a Probationary Assistant Superintendent of Police on appointment by the Governor in December 1931. Following the completion of his service examinations, he was appointed Assistant Superintendent of Police of Avissawella in December 1933 and went on to serve in Sabaragamuwa and again in Avissawella before attending the senior police officers course at the Metropolitan Police in 1936. On his return he served as Assistant Superintendent of Police in Kurunegala, Kegalle, Police Training School. In May 1943, he was promoted to Superintendent of Police and served in the Southern Proving, Police Training School, Northern Province, North-Western Province, Central Province. He was promoted Acting Deputy Inspector General of Police (DIG) in 1949 serving as DIG Administration, DIG Range II; during which time he served as the Superintendent of Police, Police Headquarters. He was appointed a Member of the Order of the British Empire (MBE) in the 1953 Coronation Honours and Officer (OBE) in the 1954 Birthday Honours. He had been awarded the Ceylon Police Medal for Meritorious Service, Defence Medal 1939-45, Ceylon Police Independence Medal and the Service Medal of the Order of St John.

== Inspector General of Police ==
In 1955 de Silva succeeded his father-in-law, Sir Richard Aluwihare to be appointed Inspector General of Police (IGP). He became the first IGP appointed from within the police force and the first Buddhist. De Silva was responsible for introducing community policing to the country, a vision that was not shared by his successors. In 1959 the Prime Minister of Ceylon, S. W. R. D. Bandaranaike requested that the police intervene against trade union action occurring at Colombo Harbour. De Silva declined to do the Prime Minister’s bidding on the basis that he believed the request was unlawful. On 24 April 1959, de Silva was compulsorily retired from the police force and M. Walter F. Abeykoon, a civil servant, was appointed in his place.

== Family ==
In 1941, he married Ena Aluvihare, the nineteen year old daughter of the civil servant Richard Aluwihare, who would become the first Ceylonese Inspector General of Police in 1947.

Police appointments
Preceded by Richard Aluwihare	Inspector General of Police; 1955–1959	Succeeded by M. Walter F. Abeykoon
