= M. Walter F. Abeykoon =

Ceylonese civil servant

14th Inspector General of Police (Ceylon)
- In office 26 April 1959 – 2 February 1963
- Preceded by: Osmund de Silva
- Succeeded by: S. A. Dissanayake

Personal details
- Born: 30 April 1903
- Died: Year of death missing
- Profession: Civil servant

Morawakkorakoralege Walter Fonseka Abeykoon (30 April 1903 – unknown) was a Ceylonese civil servant and served as the Inspector General of Police between 1959 and 1963.

== Education ==
Abeykoon received his education at Ananda College, Colombo and at the University College, Colombo gaining a BSc degree from the University of London.

== Public service career ==
He was appointed to the Survey Department in July 1929 by the Governor. He was promoted to Assistant Superintendent of Surveys in July 1932 and was seconded to the Land Settlement Department as an Assistant Settlement Officer in February 1932. In October 1937, he was appointed Assistant Settlement Officer. In December 1941, he was appointed Assistant Government Agent (Emergency), Ambalangoda and acted as Assistant Government Agent, Galle in June and July 1944. He resumed his duties as Assistant Settlement Officer in January 1947 and became the Acting Settlement Officer in May 1951 before being confirmed as the Settlement Officer in 1954.

== Inspector General of Police ==
He was appointed Inspector General of Police (IGP) on 1 May 1959 by his personal friend and bridge partner, Prime Minister S. W. R. D. Bandaranaike. The appointment was highly controversial as the Prime Minister appointed Abeykoon from outside the service by-passing a number of senior career police officers, on the basis Abeykoon was a Sinhala Buddhist. Senior police officers protested and DIG C. C. Dissanayake tendered his resignation, which was later withdrawn. The appointment was made by Bandaranaike after he removed the then IGP Osmund de Silva the first Ceylonese to be appointed IGP from within the force, who had refused Bandaranaike's request for police intervention against trade union action occurring at Colombo Harbour. De Silva declined to do the Prime Minister's bidding on the basis that he believed the request was not lawful. On 24 April 1959, de Silva was compulsorily retired from the police force with Abeyakoon subsequently appointed in his place.

=== Attempted coup ===
In 1962, when a coup d'état attempted by senior officers of the military and police, Abeykoon was caught off guard. Early warning from one of conspirators allowed the government to respond in time. In 1963, Prime Minister Sirima Bandaranaike replaced Abeykoon with DIG S. A. Dissanayake, who was instrumental in countering the 1962 coup, following Abeykoon's retirement in April 1963.

== Family ==
His brother M. K. Walter Fonseka Abeykoon (1901-1982) was the Senior Assistant Registrar at the University of Ceylon and the first Registrar at the Vidyalankara University, Kelaniya.

Police appointments
Preceded by Osmund de Silva	Inspector General of Police; 1959–1963	Succeeded by S. A. Dissanayake
