= Ministry of Public Security (Sri Lanka) =

Government ministry of Sri Lanka

- මහජන ආරක්ෂක අමාත්‍යාංශය பொதுமக்கள் பாதுகாப்பு அமைச்சு

Ministry overview
- Formed: 16 August 2013; 12 years ago
- Jurisdiction: Government of Sri Lanka
- Headquarters: Floor 14, Suhurupaya, Subuthipura road, Battaramulla; 6.903069°N 79.917034°E
- Annual budget: LKR 63 billion (2018, recurrent); LKR 5 billion (2018, capital)
- Minister responsible: Ananda Wijepala, Minister of Public Security
- Deputy Minister responsible: Sunil Watagala, Deputy Minister of Public Security
- Ministry executive: Ravi Seneviratne, Ministry Secretary
- Child agencies: Sri Lanka Police Service; National Dangerous Drugs Control Board; Galle Heritage Foundation
- Website: www.pubsec.gov.lk

The Ministry of Public Security (Sinhala: මහජන ආරක්ෂක අමාත්‍යාංශය Mahajana Arakshaka Amathyanshaya; Tamil: பொதுமக்கள் பாதுகாப்பு அமைச்சு) is a cabinet ministry of the Government of Sri Lanka responsible for law and order. The ministry is responsible for formulating and implementing national policy on law and order and other subjects which come under its purview. The ministry manages the country's police. The current Minister of Public Security is Ananda Wijepala. The ministry's secretary is Ravi Seneviratne.

== History ==
Since independence in 1948 the Sri Lankan police had come under the Ministry of Defence. The Lessons Learnt and Reconciliation Commission had recommended that policing be transferred to a separate ministry. The Ministry of Law and Order was established on 16 August 2013 to manage policing in the country.

== Ministers ==
The Minister of Public Security is a member of the Cabinet of Sri Lanka.

Ministers of Law and Order
Name	Portrait	Party	Took office	Left office	Head of government	Ministerial title	Refs
Mahinda Rajapaksa		Sri Lanka Freedom Party	26 August 2013	8 January 2015	Mahinda Rajapaksa	Minister of Law and Order	
John Amaratunga		United National Party	12 January 2015	22 March 2015	Maithripala Sirisena	Minister of Public Order, Disaster Management and Christian Affairs	
John Amaratunga		United National Party	22 March 2015	17 August 2015	Maithripala Sirisena	Minister of Public Order and Christian Religious Affairs	
Tilak Marapana		United National Party	4 September 2015	9 November 2015	Maithripala Sirisena	Minister of Law and Order and Prison Reforms	
Sagala Ratnayaka		United National Party	11 November 2015	25 February 2018	Maithripala Sirisena	Minister of Law and Order and Southern Development	
Ranil Wickremesinghe		United National Party	25 February 2018	8 March 2018	Maithripala Sirisena	Minister of Law and Order	
Ranjith Madduma Bandara		United National Party	8 March 2018	18 November 2019	Maithripala Sirisena	Minister of Law and Order	
Janaka Bandara Tennakoon		Sri Lanka Podujana Peramuna	22 November 2019	12 August 2020	Gotabaya Rajapaksa	Minister of Public Administration, Home Affairs, Provincial Councils and Local Government	
Sarath Weerasekara		Sri Lanka Podujana Peramuna	26 November 2020	18 April 2022	Gotabaya Rajapaksa	Minister of Public Security	
Prasanna Ranatunga		Sri Lanka Podujana Peramuna	18 April 2022	9 May 2022	Gotabaya Rajapaksa	Minister of Public Security and Tourism	
Tiran Alles		Sri Lanka Podujana Peramuna	20 May 2022	24 September 2024	Ranil Wickremesinghe	Minister of Public Security	
Vijitha Herath		National People's Power	24 September 2024	18 November 2024	Anura Kumara Dissanayake	Minister of Public Security	
Ananda Wijepala		National People's Power	18 November 2024	Incumbent	Anura Kumara Dissanayake	Minister of Public Security and Parliamentary Affairs	

== Secretaries ==
Law and Order Secretaries
Name	Took office	Left office	Title	Refs
Nanda Mallawaarachchi	19 August 2013		Law and Order Secretary	
Mahinda Balasuriya	20 October 2014		Law and Order Secretary	
T. M. K. B. Tennakoon	19 January 2015		Public Order, Disaster Management and Christian Affairs Secretary	
Jagath Wijeweera	8 September 2015		Law and Order and Prison Reforms Secretary	
Jagath Wijeweera	19 November 2015		Law and Order and Southern Development Secretary	
