= Charles Peter Layard =

First mayor of Colombo, Sri Lanka

Sir Charles Peter Layard

Mayor of Colombo
- In office January 1866 – June 1877
- Succeeded by: Walter Edward Davidson

Personal details
- Born: 9 December 1806 Colombo, Western Province, British Ceylon
- Died: 17 July 1893 (aged 86) London, England
- Resting place: St Peter's Church, Colombo, Ceylon
- Spouse: Louisa Anne née Edwards
- Children: Louisa Sophia, Frances Elizabeth Layard, Julia Mary, Mary Charlotte, Henrietta Emily, Laetitia Anna, Clemence Jane, Jane Caroline, Charles Peter
- Education: St John's College, Cambridge

Sir Charles Peter Layard, KCMG (9 December 1806 – 17 July 1893), was the first Mayor of Colombo (1866–1877) and the Government Agent for the Western Provinces of Ceylon.

== Biography of Charles Peter Layard ==
Charles Peter Layard was born on 9 December 1806 in Colombo, the first son of Charles Edward Layard (1786–1852) and Barbara Brigentina née Mooyart (1789–1845). His father migrated to Ceylon in 1804, where he took up an appointment as the Second Assistant to the Agent of Revenue in Jaffna. He had twenty other siblings.

Layard was educated at St John's College, Cambridge, where obtained a MA (Cantab). He returned to Ceylon where he joined the Ceylon Civil Service, becoming an Assistant in the Colonial Office, between 1830 and 1832. Between 1832 and 1839 he was the Assistant to Collector at Colombo, following which he was appointed as a District Judge in Galle (1839–40) and at Trincomalee (1840–50) and again at Galle (1850–51). During this period he acted as Colonial Secretary on at least three occasions. From January 1866 to June 1877 he served as the first Mayor of Colombo. In September that year he was awarded a Companion of the Order of St Michael and St George (CMG). From 1876 he also served as the Government Agent Western Provinces of Ceylon. On 30 March 1876 he was invested as a Knight Commander of the Order of St Michael and St George (KCMG).

=== Personal ===
On 29 May 1834, Layard married Louisa Anne Edwards (1809–1886) in Weston Super Mare, Somerset, England. They had nine children: Louisa Sophia (1835–1896), Frances Elizabeth (1837–1932), Julia Mary (1838 - 1921), Mary Charlotte (1840–1932), Henrietta Emily (1842–1919), Laetitia Anna (1844–1930), Clemence Jane (1846–1926), Jane Caroline (1848–1890) and Charles Peter (1849–1916). Their son Charles went on to become the 18th Chief Justice of Ceylon.

Layard died on 17 July 1893 in Chelsea, London and was buried in Tiverton, Devon, England.
