= Ceylon Police Independence Medal =

- Type: Commemorative medal
- Awarded for: Service
- Presented by: Ceylon
- Eligibility: Members of the Ceylon Police
- Status: No longer awarded
- Established: 1955
- Ribbon bar

Precedence
- Next (higher): Ceylon Armed Services Inauguration Medal
- Next (lower): Sierra Leone Independence Medal

The Ceylon Police Independence Medal was a decoration presented to all members of the Ceylon Police serving in 1948, in commemoration of the country's independence from the United Kingdom.

While Ceylon was granted independence in 1948, both the Ceylon Armed Services Inauguration Medal and the Ceylon Police Independence Medal were retrospective awards approved by Elizabeth II, Queen of Ceylon, in 1955. The obverse of both medals feature the Queen's Ceylonese style and title.
