= Inspector General of Police (Sri Lanka) =

Head of the Sri Lanka police

- Flag of the Sri Lanka Police
- Incumbent; Priyantha Weerasooriya since 13 August 2025 (Acting: 27 September 2024 – 13 August 2025)
- Sri Lanka Police Service
- Abbreviation: IGP
- Member of: National Security Council
- Reports to: Ministry of Law and Order
- Nominator: President of Sri Lanka
- Appointer: Constitutional Council
- Constituting instrument: Police Ordinance, No. 16 of 1865
- Precursor: Fiscal of Colombo
- Formation: 3 September 1866; 160 years ago
- First holder: William Robert Campbell (as Chief Superintendent of Police)
- Deputy: Senior Deputy Inspector General of Police (SDIG)
- Website: www.police.lk

The Inspector General of Police (IGP) is the professional head of the Sri Lanka Police. They are the most senior police officer in Sri Lanka and oversees all police personnel throughout the country. The IGP reports to the Minister of Law and Order, when the Police Service is under the Ministry of Law and Order as it is currently.

== History ==
The post of Inspector General of Police in Sri Lanka can be traced as far back as 1797 when the office of Fiscal was created and Fredric Barron Mylius was appointed Fiscal of Colombo and entrusted with responsibility of policing the City of Colombo. In 1833, the Head of the Police Service was called the Superintendent of Police, in 1836 the designation was changed to Chief Superintendent of Police.

The official establishment of the Ceylon Police Force was on 3 September 1866 when William Robert Campbell (then the chief of police in the Indian province of Rathnageri) was appointed Chief Superintendent of Police in Ceylon to be in charge of the Police units. This post officially became the Chief of Police but was soon changed to that of the Inspector General of Police. Accordingly, William Robert Campbell became the first Inspector General of Police.

On 26 April 2019 President Maithripala Sirisena instructed Pujith Jayasundara to resign over failures that led to the deadly Easter bomb attacks. Due to a lack of response from Jayasundara, he was put on compulsory leave with Senior DIG C. D. Wickramaratne appointed the acting Inspector General.

After two extensions Wickramaratne was given a third extension by President Ranil Wickramasinghe on 9 October 2023, which was subsequently rejected by the Constitutional Council, with all members disagreeing with the president leaving the validity of the post and making the post vacant for the first time in the country's history. On 29 November 2023 Deshabandu Tennakoon was appointed acting Inspector General by President Wickremesinghe. He was formally confirmed as Inspector General on 26 February 2024, with the speaker Mahinda Yapa Abeywardane acting unconstitutionally voting which the supreme courts of Sri Lanka suspending Deshabandu acting in post.

President Anura Kumara Dissanayake appointed Priyantha Weerasooriya as the 37th Inspector General of Police on 13 August 2025. He had previously served in an acting capacity since 27 September 2024.

== Removal ==
The Inspector General of Police can be removed through an investigation by a 3-member committee if found guilty of specified offence(s) under the Removal of Officers (Procedure) Act No. 5 of 2002.

== Inspectors General of Police ==
No.	Inspector General	Took office	Left office	Appointed by	Ref.
1	George William Robert Campbell	3 September 1866	1872	Robinson	
2	Frederick Richard Saunders	1872	1873	Gregory	
3	George William Robert Campbell	1873	1891	Gregory	
4	Louis Knollys	1891	1902	Gordon	
5	Albert De Wilton	1902	1905	Ridgeway	
6	Cyril Longden	1905	1910	Blake	
7	Ivor Edward David	1910	1913	McCallum	
8	Herbert Dowbiggin	1913	1937	Chalmers	
9	Philip Norton Banks	1937	1942	Stubbs	
10	Gordon Herbert Ramsay Halland	1942	1944	Caldecott	
11	Ranulph Bacon	1944	1946	Moore	
12	Richard Aluwihare	1946	1955	Moore	
13	Osmund de Silva	26 July 1955	24 April 1959	Goonetilleke	
14	M. Walter F. Abeykoon	1 May 1959	2 February 1963	Goonetilleke	
15	S. A. Dissanayake	3 February 1963	3 June 1966	Gopallawa	
16	John Attygalle	4 June 1966	7 July 1967	Gopallawa	
17	Aleric Abeygunawardena	8 July 1967	13 September 1970	Gopallawa	
18	Stanley Senanayake	14 September 1970	23 August 1978	Gopallawa	
19	Ana Seneviratne	24 August 1978	14 March 1982	Jayewardene	
20	Rudra Rajasingham	20 March 1982	20 March 1985	Jayewardene	
21	Herbert Weerasinghe	20 April 1985	5 December 1985	Jayewardene	
22	Cyril Herath	6 December 1985	31 July 1988	Jayewardene	
23	Ernest Perera	1 August 1988	29 November 1993	Premadasa	
24	Frank de Silva	29 November 1993	31 July 1995	Wijetunga	
25	Wickremasinghe Rajaguru	31 July 1995	31 August 1998	Kumaratunga	
26	Lakdasa Kodituwakku	1 September 1998	27 August 2002	Kumaratunga	
27	T. E. Anandaraja	1 October 2002	14 October 2003	Kumaratunga	
28	Indra de Silva	19 December 2003	30 September 2004	Kumaratunga	
29	Chandra Fernando	1 October 2004	11 October 2006	Kumaratunga	
30	Victor Perera	12 October 2006	31 June 2008	M. Rajapaksa	
31	Jayantha Wickramarathne	1 July 2008	2 November 2009	M. Rajapaksa	
32	Mahinda Balasuriya	3 November 2009	17 June 2011	M. Rajapaksa	
33	Nugagaha Kapalle Illangakoon	16 July 2011	11 April 2016	M. Rajapaksa	
34	Pujith Jayasundara	20 April 2016	14 March 2020 (Note: On compulsory leave since April 2019 and formally retired on 14 March 2020)	Sirisena	
35	C. D. Wickramaratne	27 November 2020 (Note: Acting Inspector General from 29 April 2019, appointed as permanent Inspector General on 27 November 2020)	23 November 2023	G. Rajapaksa	
36	Deshabandu Tennakoon	26 February 2024 (Note: Acting Inspector General from 29 November 2023, appointed as permanent Inspector General on 26 February 2024)	24 July 2024 (suspended) (Note: Suspended from duties on 24 July 2024 and removed from office on 5 August 2025)	Wickramasinghe	
37	Priyantha Weerasooriya	13 August 2025 (Note: Acting Inspector General from 27 September 2024, appointed as permanent Inspector General on 13 August 2025)	Incumbent	Dissnayake	

== See also ==
- Inspector-General of Police
- Sri Lanka Police
- Special Task Force
- Ministry of Defence
