= Rajagiriya =

Rajagiriya රාජගිරිය ராஜகிரியை
- Suburb
- Location within Sri Lanka
- Coordinates: 6°55′9″N 79°53′42″E
- Country: Sri Lanka
- Province: Western Province
- District: Colombo District
- Time zone: UTC+5:30 (Sri Lanka Standard Time Zone)
- Postal code: 10107

Rajagiriya is a part of the Sri Lanka's administrative capital of Sri Jayawardenapura. A fairly large suburb bordering Colombo, Rajagiriya lies between Borella and Ethul Kotte, straddling Parliament Road.

== History ==
The area was originally known as Welikada and stretched from the Ethul Kotte bridge to the tram terminus at Borella. The Welikada Prison was originally within the village limits.

The name Rajagiriya came from the former governor's residence, the grounds of which extended from Madinnagoda Road in the north to the Cotta Road in the south. The house and grounds were later purchased by Ananda Coomaraswamy. According to historian Douglas Ranasinghe, a Malayali servant of Coomaraswamy's saw a large mongoose in the garden and shouted 'Raja kiriya' (meaning 'large mongoose') and the name stuck.

There is another viewpoint about the origin of the name. Since the Kotte kingdom was the main kingdom during 1412–1597, the Rajagiriya area took a major place in kingdom's security. In the Sinhala language, the word Rajagiriya is a combination of the words 'Raja' and 'Giriya'. 'Raja' (රාජ) means 'King' and 'Giriya' (ගිරිය) means 'Neck' or 'Rock'. The castle was not very far from Rajagiriya. Since there are no significant mountains or rocks and the area is mostly plain, 'Giriya' is believed to mean 'Neck' in this context. In the Sinhala language, neck is used to distinguish not only the physical part of the body, but also something important. Many elders who live in this area believe that the name Rajagiriya was chosen because of its importance in the Kingdom of Kotte.

The house was later purchased by Anagarika Dharmapala. The Hewavitharana Textile Training School was built within the grounds and later Hewavitharana Maha Vidyalaya. The house and the truncated lands were later acquired by the Obeyesekere family and it is generally known as the 'Obeyesekere Walauwa'.

The area developed because of plumbago, which was shipped up the canal network from Ingiriya in the Kalutara district for purification at the Welikada graphite works.

The vicinity of the Ethul Kotte bridge became a minor industrial area, with the electroplastics and 'Pinnacle' factories and the Ceylon Transport Board's ticket machine workshops.

Several historic buildings in the area have been destroyed. These include the ancient Ambalama (rest house) and the 'Welikada Hotel and Bakery' at the Welikada junction, The 'Shermila' cinema (originally the Kotte urban development council's first market) and multiple old houses.

Many of the area's marshes, which were the habitat of birds within the Sri Jayawardenapura Kotte Bird Sanctuary, and which were designated as flood-retention areas, were filled up and built on in spite of the protests by the residents of that area.

In the late 1970's, The Government of JR Jayawardene ran a major road through the very middle of the EW Perera Park (which commemorated a national hero and was the venue for Football, Cricket and other sports).

=== Areas in Rajagiriya ===
The Sri Jayawardenapura Kotte municipal ward of Rajagiriya is confined to the areas around the original grounds of the Governor's house.

The Rajagiriya postal area (also known as the Welikada postal area) also includes Kotiyagoda and Kalapaluwawa within the Kaduwela Municipal council limits.

Rajagiriya within the Kotte municipal limits comprises:

- Ward no. 1 - Rajagiriya (includes Rajagiriya proper - the area around the Governor's house - Obeyesekerepura, Moragasmulla and Madinnagoda road, bounded by the Kolonnawa Ela canal on the north, the Heen Ela canal on the west, the Cotta Road on the south and the Welikada ward on the east);
- Ward no. 2 - Welikada (includes Welikada proper, and stretches from the Welikada junction to the Ethul Kotte junction, bounded by the Kolonnawa Ela canal on the north and east, Ward 1 on the west, and the Cotta Road on the south).
- Ward no. 3 - Welikada-Nawala (includes Bandaranaikepura and Royal Gardens, the Municipal offices and the western half of Nawala and of Koswatte, bounded by the Cotta Road on the north, the Heen Ela canal on the west, the Diyawanna Oya canal on the south and the Nawala Road on the east).
- Ward no. 4 - Nawala (includes Welikadawatte, eastern Koswatte and Nawala, bounded by the Cotta Road on the north, the Nawala Road on the west and the Diyawanna Oya canal on the south and east).

=== Important locations ===
- Rajagiriya, the old governor's mansion (formerly the Obeyesekere Walauwa)
- E. W. Perera Children's Park (what remains of the old park and football ground) on Nawala Road
- Sri Jayawardanapura Kotte Municipal Council building on Nawala Road
- The Kachcheri
- Head-office of the Election Commission
- Official Languages Department
- Special Task Force camp
- HSBC Electronic Data Processing Group Service Centre
- Head-office of the Lanka Orix Leasing Company
- Hewavitharana Textile Training School on Dharmapala Mawatha
- President's College
- The mosque on Nawala Road
- The Anglican Church of St Stephen (the gal-palliya or stone church) at Moragasmulla
- The Roman Catholic Sacred Heart Church
- Head-office of Prima Ceylon
- Head-office of Perera And Sons Bakers

== See also ==
- Rajagiriya Flyover
- Royal Park Murder
