= Sri Devananda College =

Coordinates: 6°14′07″N 80°03′13″E

Sri Devananda College ශ්‍රී දේවානන්ද විද්‍යාලය
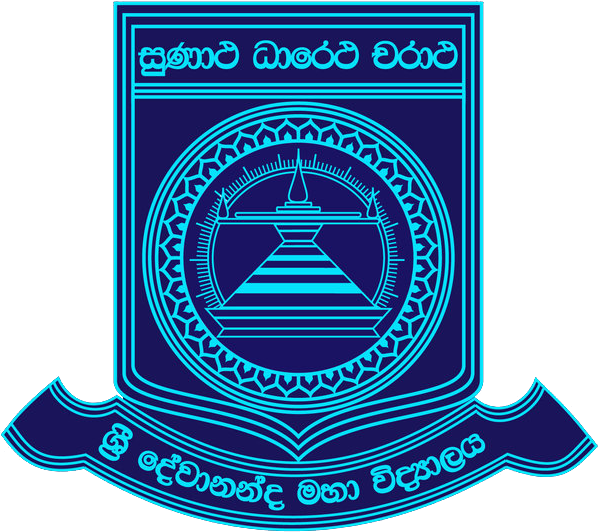
- Sri Devananda College; Ambalangoda, Southern Province; Sri Lanka

Information
- Type: National
- Motto: "සුනාථ ධාරෙථ චරාථ"; Sunatha Dharetha Charatha (Quotation from the Dhammapada.)
- Religious affiliation: Buddhist
- Founded: 1887
- School district: Galle
- Principal: Janaka Peduruhewa
- Grades: Class 1 - 13
- Gender: Co-educational
- Language: Sinhalese
- Campus size: 9,831 square metres (2.429 acres)
- Campus type: Urban
- Colour
- Website: www.devanandacollege.lk

Sri Devananda College is a co-educational school in Ambalangoda in the Southern Province of Sri Lanka. The current principal is Janaka Peduruheva.

== History ==
=== Foundation ===
In the 19th century, education in Sri Lanka was dominated by the Christian missionary societies. Buddhist, Muslim and Hindu children had little choice but to study in Christian schools; such an education was the best qualification for a job because of government preference for Christian schools. There were some vernacular schools and, although they were funded by government grants and supported by philanthropic neighbours, they were limited in number and resources. In 1836, the Colebrooke–Cameron Commission recommended that a ministry be appointed to manage education. As a result, the government took over the provision of education and Colombo Academy was founded in the capital. The late 19th century saw the founding of several new independent schools, mostly linked to the Anglican church, but provision for education of non-Christian, non-English-speaking children remained patchy.

On 17 May 1880 Col. Henry Steel Olcott disembarked at Galle port determined to change this situation. Olcott was a founder of the Theosophical Society and, whilst in Sri Lanka, he took Five Precepts at the Wijayananda Viharaya. He was then declared to be a Buddhist, although he had claimed himself to be so even before he left the USA. En route to Colombo, he participated in a welcome ceremony at Ambalangoda, where he discussed the necessity of a Buddhist school. In the face of spreading Christian education in the area, Dodanduwe Piyarathana, Katudampe Malalankara, Ambalangoda Sri devananda and others established the Ambalangoda Sugatha Sasanodaya society.

On 19 January 1887, the society opened Vidyalankara Native-Language Buddhist Boys' School in a rented room with 19 boys on roll. The first principal was Ginige Mendias De Silva.

The Sugatha Sasanodaya Society faced serious problems in increasing student numbers, owing to lack of space. The society assigned land called "Ambagahawatta" to the school for 20 years by a deed. The school continued in temporary huts.

In time, the society established two separate and additional schools, one for Buddhist girls and the other an English language school. The society, now with three schools to maintain, again faced financial problems. It was denied financial assistance by the government and so, in 1899, the schools were handed over to the Buddhist Sasanodaya company whose patron was Henry Olcott. As the school was situated in the land of Ambagahawatta people, it was called Ambagahawatta Pasala.

=== 20th Century ===
In the early 20th century, the school was renamed Patabandimulla Vidyalankara Junior Mixed School and had 68 pupils. It continued as a junior school until 1911, then gradually opened higher classes to meet demand. By 1926, there were 305 pupils and 11 teachers.

Throughout this period, the school established its own customs. Full Moon Poya Day was declared a school holiday. On Poya Day, pupils processed carrying flowers to Kariththakanda Vihara to worship the Buddha and also listened to the preaching of Dhamma at Mahachathia Pirivena. There were difficulties to face in maintaining the school; fortunately Mudaliyar Thomas de Silva came forward and offered two mansions at Dombagahawatta to house the school.

On 31 September 1928, teacher O.G. Nanawathi wrote and published a hand-bill by the name of Sri Vaakvodaya, believed to be the first media presentation in the history of the school.

H. K. M. de Silva was the first student to pass the school leaving exam after the school was established as a junior school. The school log book notes the visit of the first post-independence prime minister of India, Jawahallar Neru and the first lady Kamala Kaul on 19 May 1931.

=== Patabandimulla Vidyalankara State Senior Mixed School ===
The school was promoted to be a senior mixed school on 1 May 1934, but it was difficult to progress owing to lack of facilities and financial problems. In January 1935 Patabandimulla Vidyalankara Senior Mixed School was accepted as a government school and thus began to receive government funding. D. T. Fernando was the principal of the school and, in 1937, G. L. D. Jinadasa and M. W. Babinona passed in the first exam after the school's promotion.

There were many changes in the school during Fernando's tenure, including the composition of the school anthem, the introduction of a tie for the girls and the creation of a school flag. The first prize giving ceremony was held on 16 September 1939, presided over by Thomas Amarasuriya with his wife giving away the prizes. The first mayor of Ambalangoda Urban Council (T. P. C. Fernando) and H. DeS. Kularatna delivered the speeches; Ambalangoda Dammakusala and Walagedara Somalokatissa also spoke.

For around a decade after coming under government control, the school struggled with inadequate class rooms. The school held classes both in the mornings and the afternoons. Some properties of the school were allegedly stolen in this period and pupil numbers fell. On 3 March 1948, the school merged onto the single site the Sri Devananda College occupies today. On 1 April 1948, the government took full control of the school. Fernando had a great role to play in restoring the standards of the school. On 6 July 1953, the school was provided with a new building, which is the oldest building on the campus today. Principal Fernando left the school after completing 20 years of service; there were 818 pupils in the school when he left.

In 1953, the government introduced 'O' level examinations in place of the Senior School Certificate examinations. Although 43 pupils were presented by the college for this exam, only 7 pupils passed.

=== Sri Devananda Maha Vidyalaya ===
On 1 January 1959, the school was promoted as Sri Devananda Maha Vidyalaya having been a Government Senior Mixed School for 25 years. Then, the school was approved to hold classes for Senior School Certificate for university entrance; 'Advanced' level art classes begins in the same year. The Principal Agodage Piyatissa De Silva was appointed at this time. In 1960, four pupils qualified for university entrance in the art stream.

When the government decided to appoint separate principals for primary schools on the island, K. M. G. Darmadasa became the first principal of the primary school of Sri Devananda Maha Vidyalaya on 23 January 1962. The following year, some pupils published a fortnightly newspaper called Darshana. The editor of this paper was Mr Ginendrawansa, who later became a writer. He was the author of Vikasitha Siyapatha, which includes a history of the school and was published on the 125th anniversary of the school's founding.

School cricket began in the year 1963, headed by T. Udula de Silva. At the same time, a new badge and flag were created. At the annual cricket encounter between Devananda Maha Vidyalaya and Bandarawela Dharmasoka Central College in 1966, Devananda Vidyalaya won the match by an innings.

=== National school ===
Commerce subjects were first taught at the school in 1966 and 47 pupils qualified in the first cohort. Though the school was approved to teach science classes by mid-1977, they did not begin immediately owing to a lack of trained teachers. Science classes began two years later with 20 students. W.M. Sumith was the first student to enter university in the science stream in 1982, entering the dental faculty. He is said to have used the laboratory at Dharmasoka College since Devananda College had no laboratory.

Under the government's National School Concept, Devananda Vidyalaya became a national school on 15 March 1994 under principal Darmasiri Ginige.

=== Since 2000 ===
The 21st century began with ownership of the land being transferred to Sri Devananda Vidyalaya, having previously been in the hands of individuals. At the same time, the first group of students sat for the G.C.E. 'O' level examination in agriculture.

The commemoration of the 125th anniversary of the school was organized by a committee, which arranged an educational exhibition and a trade exhibition on the school premises and at the UoC campus at Ambalangoda to mark the occasion.

== Principals ==
From	To	Principal
1887	1903	Ginige Mendias de Silva
1903	1910	H. A. M. Jayawardana
1910	1914	A. G. Arnolis Perera
1914	1916	—
1916	1924	A. C. Narangoda
1924	1930	H. K. M. de Silva
1930	1934	Alan Peter de Zoysa
1934	1954	Danister Thomas Fernando
1954	1958	H. L. Fonseka
1959	1964	E. P. de Silva
1965	1969	K. H. Vilmat O. de Silva
1977	1979	H. S. Laxman de Silva
1979	1988	W. T. D. de Silva
1988	1990	W. H. Percy Noel
1990	1991	M. W. S. Sugathapala
1991	2000	Darmasiri Ginige
2001	2002	T. Ajantha Ranaweera
2002	2011	H. M. Sumathipala
2011	2017	Indrarathna Kaluarachchi
2017	2018	M. Upul Jaya Sri de Silva
2018	2020	S.Sooriyaarachchi
2020	Present	Janaka Peduruhewa
