= Rajagiriya (Sri Jayawardanapura Kotte) Grama Niladhari Division =

Rajagiriya
- Grama Niladhari Division
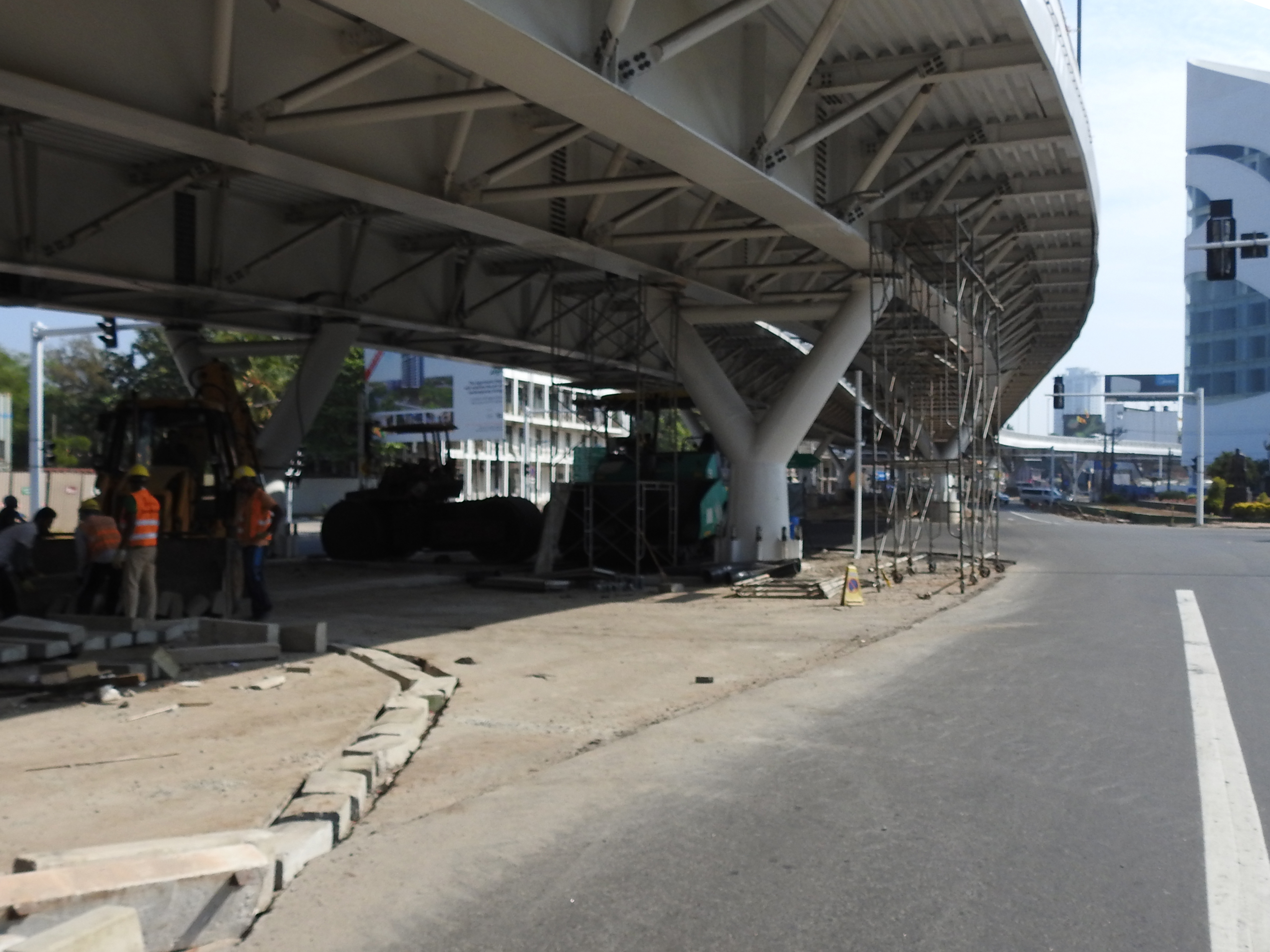
- Rajagiriya Flyover is located within, nearby or associated with the Rajagiriya Grama Niladhari Division
- Interactive map of Rajagiriya
- Coordinates: 6.906646°N 79.897046°E
- Country: Sri Lanka
- Province: Western Province
- District: Colombo District
- Divisional Secretariat: Sri Jayawardanapura Kotte Divisional Secretariat
- Electoral District: Colombo Electoral District
- Polling Division: Kotte Polling Division

Area
  - Total: 0.72 km^{2} (0.28 sq mi)
- Elevation: 79 m (259 ft)

Population (2012)
  - Total: 3,591
  - Density: 4,988/km^{2} (12,920/sq mi)
- ISO 3166 code: LK-1124020

Rajagiriya

Rajagiriya Grama Niladhari Division is a Grama Niladhari Division of the Sri Jayawardanapura Kotte Divisional Secretariat of Colombo District of Western Province, Sri Lanka. It has Grama Niladhari Division Code 514B.

Welikadawatte, Rajagiriya Flyover, President's College, Sri Jayawardenapura Kotte, Institute of Chemistry Ceylon, Election Commission of Sri Lanka, Altitude (building) and Hewavitharana Maha Vidyalaya are located within, nearby or associated with Rajagiriya.

Rajagiriya is a surrounded by the Welikada East, Ethulkotte West, Koswatta, Welikada North and Welikada West Grama Niladhari Divisions.

== Demographics ==
=== Ethnicity ===
The Rajagiriya Grama Niladhari Division has a Sinhalese majority (57.6%) and a significant Moor population (33.6%). In comparison, the Sri Jayawardanapura Kotte Divisional Secretariat (which contains the Rajagiriya Grama Niladhari Division) has a Sinhalese majority (84.8%)

Ethnicity in Rajagiriya
1. Sinhalese (57.6%)
2. Moor (33.6%)
3. Sri Lankan Tamil (6.90%)
4. Other (1.90%)

=== Religion ===
The Rajagiriya Grama Niladhari Division has a Buddhist majority (51.5%) and a significant Muslim population (34.3%). In comparison, the Sri Jayawardanapura Kotte Divisional Secretariat (which contains the Rajagiriya Grama Niladhari Division) has a Buddhist majority (77.1%)

Religion in Rajagiriya
1. Buddhist (51.5%)
2. Muslim (34.3%)
3. Roman Catholic (6.70%)
4. Hindu (5.20%)
5. Other Christian (2.20%)
6. Other (0.20%)

== Gallery ==
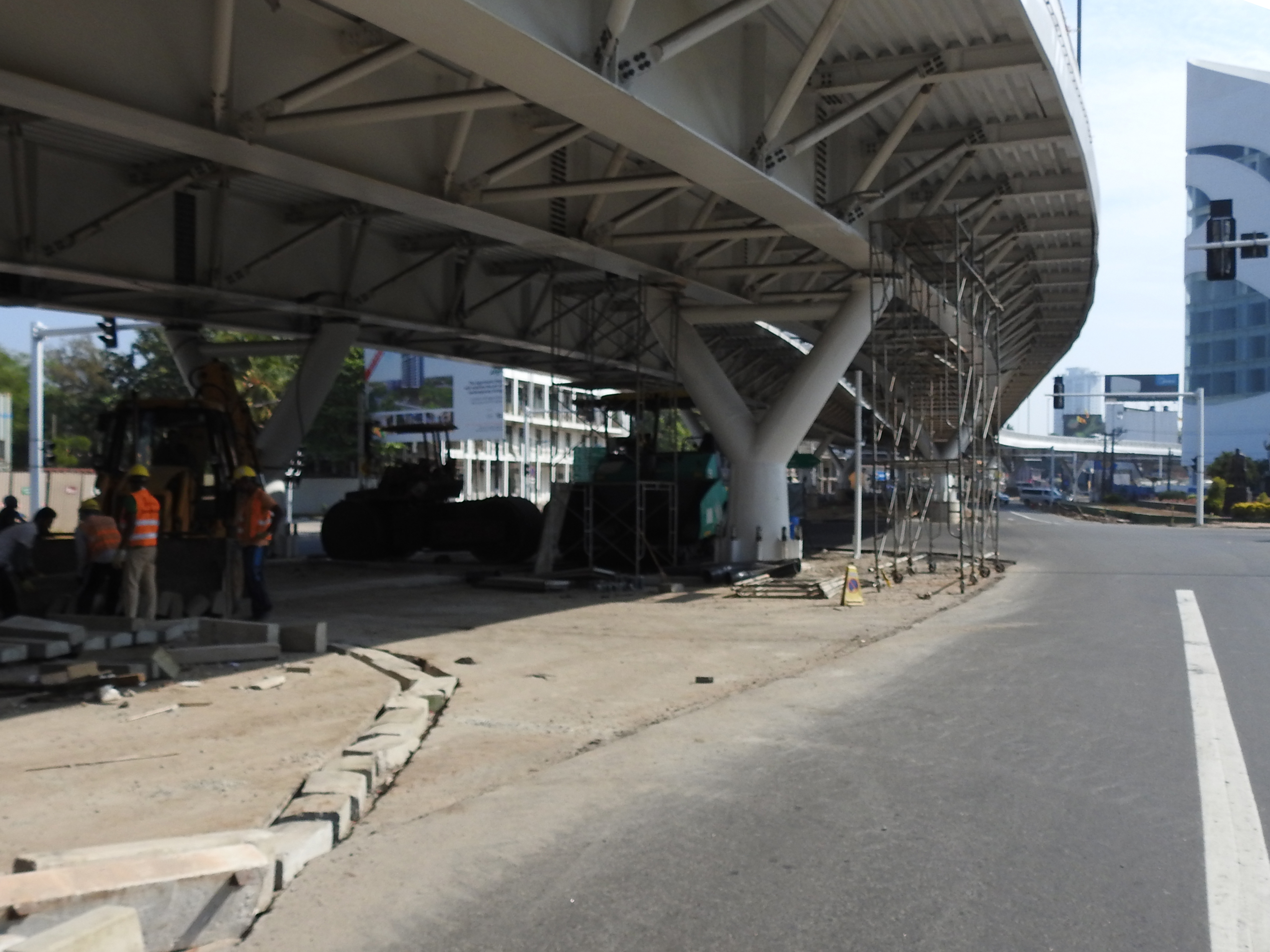
Rajagiriya Flyover

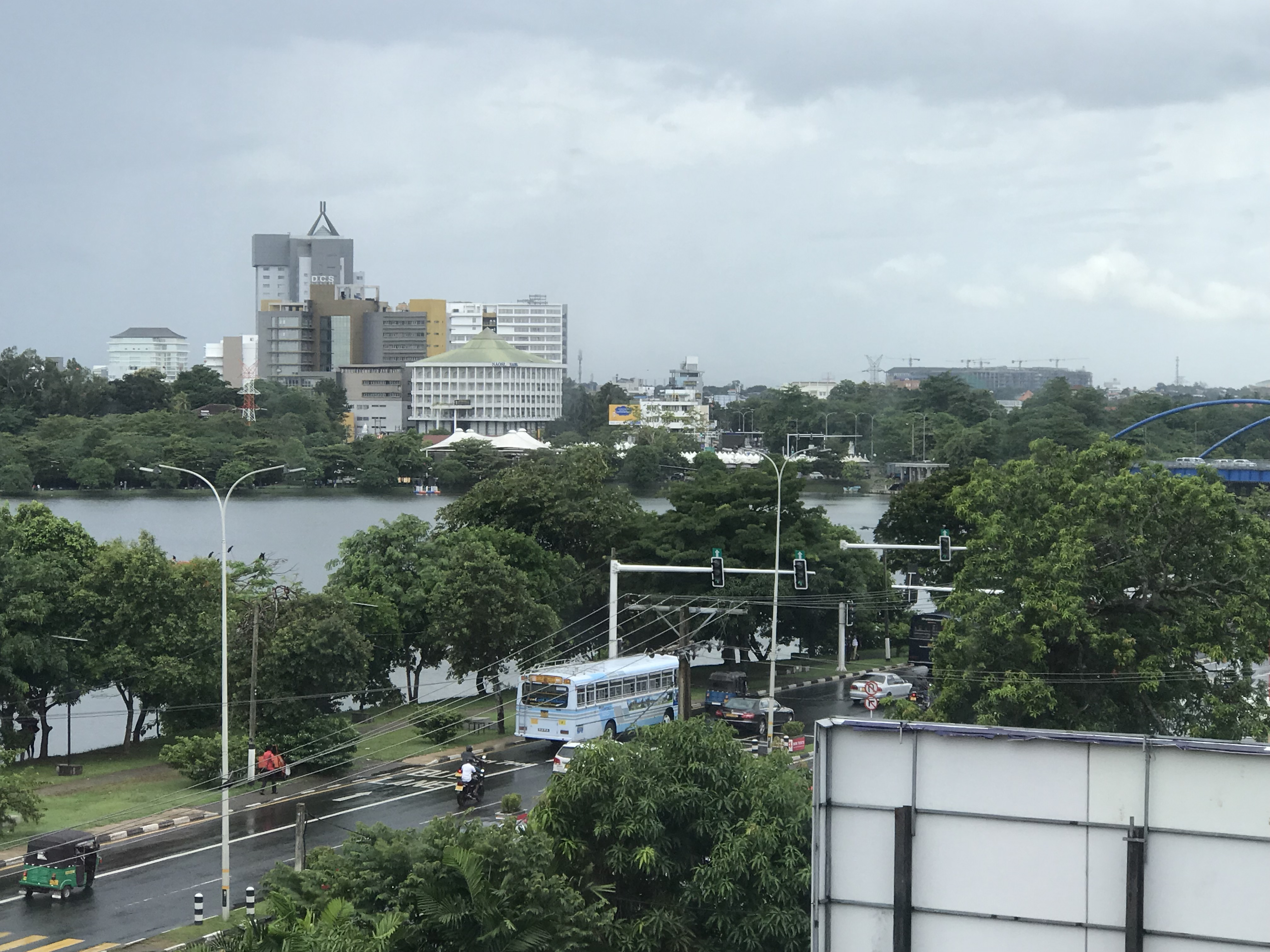
President's College, Sri Jayawardenapura Kotte

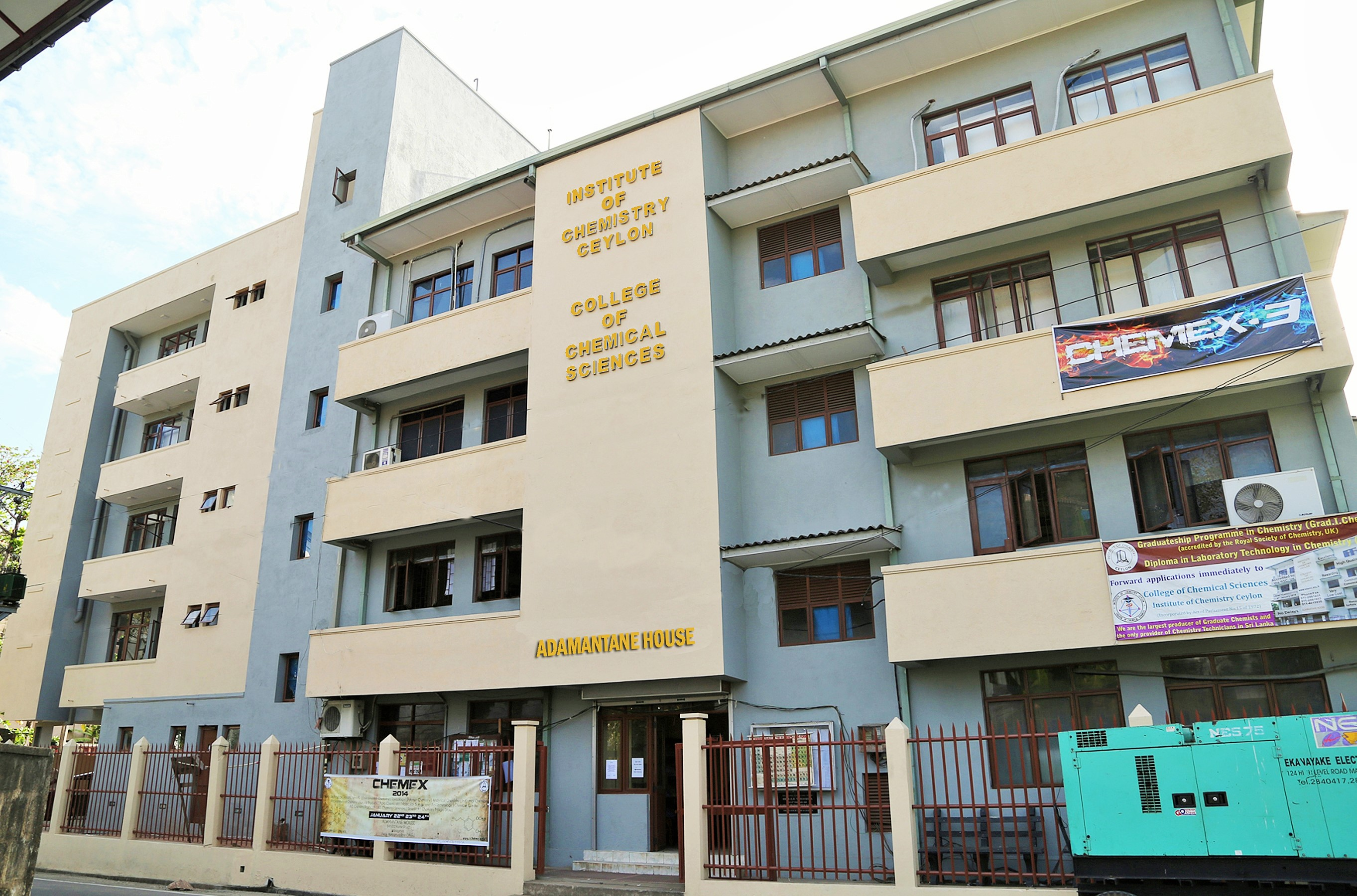
Institute of Chemistry Ceylon )
