= Dilshan De Silva =

Sri Lankan cricketer (born 1972)

Dilshan de Silva
Personal information
- Born: 3 February 1972 (age 54); Ambalangoda, Sri Lanka
- Batting: Left-handed
- Role: Wicket-keeper

Manimel Wadu Dilshan De Silva (born 3 February 1972) is a Sri Lankan cricket umpire and former cricketer. He was the secretary of Sri Lanka Schools Cricket Association (SLSCA) for two decades. He also a member of the Sri Lanka Cricket Umpires’ Association.

== Playing career ==
Dilshan de Silva who represented Dharmasoka College, Ambalangoda and was a member of the Ambalangoda Rio CC. He was a left -handed batsman and a wicketkeeper.
