= Mahinda Deshapriya =

Former election commissioner of Sri Lanka

- මහින්ද දේශප්රිය

1st Chairman of Election Commission of Sri Lanka
- In office 13 November 2015 – 13 November 2020
- Preceded by: Position created
- Succeeded by: Nimal G. Punchihewa

8th Commissioner of the Department of Elections
- In office 26 March 2011 – 13 November 2015
- Preceded by: Dayananda Dissanayake
- Succeeded by: Position abolished

Personal details
- Born: Waduge Warunasiri Mahinda Deshapriya; 6 June 1955 (age 70)
- Relations: Sunanda Deshapriya (Brother)
- Education: Dharmasoka College
- Alma mater: University of Peradeniya

Waduge Warunasiri Mahinda Deshapriya (Sinhala: මහින්ද දේශප්රිය; born 6 June 1955) is a Sri Lankan civil servant who served as the 1st Chairman of Election Commission of Sri Lanka from 2015 to 2020, previously serving as 8th Commissioner of Department of Elections from 2011 to 2015.

On 30 November 2019, he informed the speaker of parliament that he would resign from the post and that his intention had been forwarded to the president Gotabhaya Rajapaksa.

== Personal life and education ==
He was born on 6 June 1955, as the fourth child of parents Waduge Piyasena and Wellage Aunty Nona, both residents of Ambalangoda village in the Galle, Sri Lanka. He has four brothers and one sister. His father, Waduge Piyasena, was a trained Sinhala teacher. When he retired, he was the principal of Ronnadu College. He graduated from Prajapati Gothami Balika Vidyalaya, Ambalangoda and entered Dharmasoka Vidyalaya in 1961. He completed education at Dharmasoka College, Ambalangoda. He was a bright student of the school as well as an excellent speaker. Mahinda's teacher in charge of the class was a teacher named Fonseka, mother of general Sarath Fonseka. Mahinda's knowledge was generally superior to that of the other students in the class, therefore, he faced a special examination and transferred to the upper primary class.

The magazine "Singithi" was published when he was in the fifth class. Two of his articles were also published in "Singithi" Magazine in 1965. Mahinda passed the competitive examination and selected to the Maha Vidyalaya in 1966. Politically, he was a leftist. Piyasena was well versed in arithmetic. The house later became a meeting place for JVP leader Rohana Wijeweera and his members, and Mahinda's elder brother Sunanda was the youngest leader in the discussions. Sunanda was one of the main suspects in the 1971 JVP insurrection led by Wijeweera and was the fifth suspect in the case. He later became the editor of the "Yukthiya" newspaper, and a well-known journalist. During the 1970s, Mahinda also contributed generously to his brother Sunanda's work and was instrumental in spreading revolutionary ideas among the students.

He entered the University of Peradeniya and became a member of the Arts circle of the Faculty of Science. He continued his political activities at the university as well. He graduated from the university with a bachelor's degree in physical science in 1977.

== Career ==
After graduation, he started his teaching career as a chemistry and mathematics teacher at Dharmasoka College, which was his alma mater. He joined with Sri Lanka Administrative Services through Department of Elections in 1982. Later on 2 July 1983, he was appointed as the assistant commissioner of elections in the Department of Elections. In 1998, he was appointed as the Jaffna District returning officer and in 2006 he was appointed as the deputy commissioner of elections.

In 2010, he became the additional commissioner and became the chairman of the Elections Commission with the abolition of the Elections Department and the Elections Commissioner, which had existed until then with the 19th Amendment to the Constitution. That was with the inauguration of the Election Commission on 13 November 2015. Mahinda was appointed as the first chairman of the Election Commission, was the first and only person to hold that post. During the run-up to the 2015 presidential election, the statement "Shoot the head, not the leg" became extremely popular. He was awarded the Sri Lankan of the Year award at the Lanka Market Digest Awards in 2015 and the Public Servant of the Year award at TV Derana in 2016.

=== Awards ===
- "Sri Lankan of the Year" by Lanka Market Digest in 2015
- "Public Servant of the Year" by Derana TV channel 2016

== See also ==
- Election Commission of Sri Lanka
- Elections in Sri Lanka
