= Kularathna Maha Vidyalaya =

P. De S. Kularathna College

Location
- Ambalangoda, Southern province Sri Lanka
- Coordinates: 6°13′30″N 80°3′24″E

Information
- Type: National School
- Motto: Vidwan Sarvatra Pujyate (A learned man is honored throughout the world)
- Religious affiliation: Buddhist
- Established: 1986
- Principal: G.W.Jagath Senarathne
- Grades: 1-13
- Enrollment: 3200
- Language: Sinhala
- Colours: Green and White
- Nickname: Rathnians
- Website: www.kularathnacollege.lk

P. De S. Kularathna College is a mixed school in Ambalangoda, Sri Lanka. The school was established in 1986 by Hon. Anagarika Ryter Thilakasekara, then MP for Ambalangoda and the founder principal of the school was Mr. Dayawansha Ginige. The school is named after the famous Sri Lankan educationist Patrick de Silva Kularatne. Presently Kulrathna Maha Vidyalaya provides primary and secondary education to a student population of over 3000.

Currently, the largest standing statue erected in a school in Sri Lanka is located in P. De. S Kularathne College.
