= Sunandarama Vihara =

Sunandarama Maha Vihara
- සුනන්දාරාම මහා විහාරය
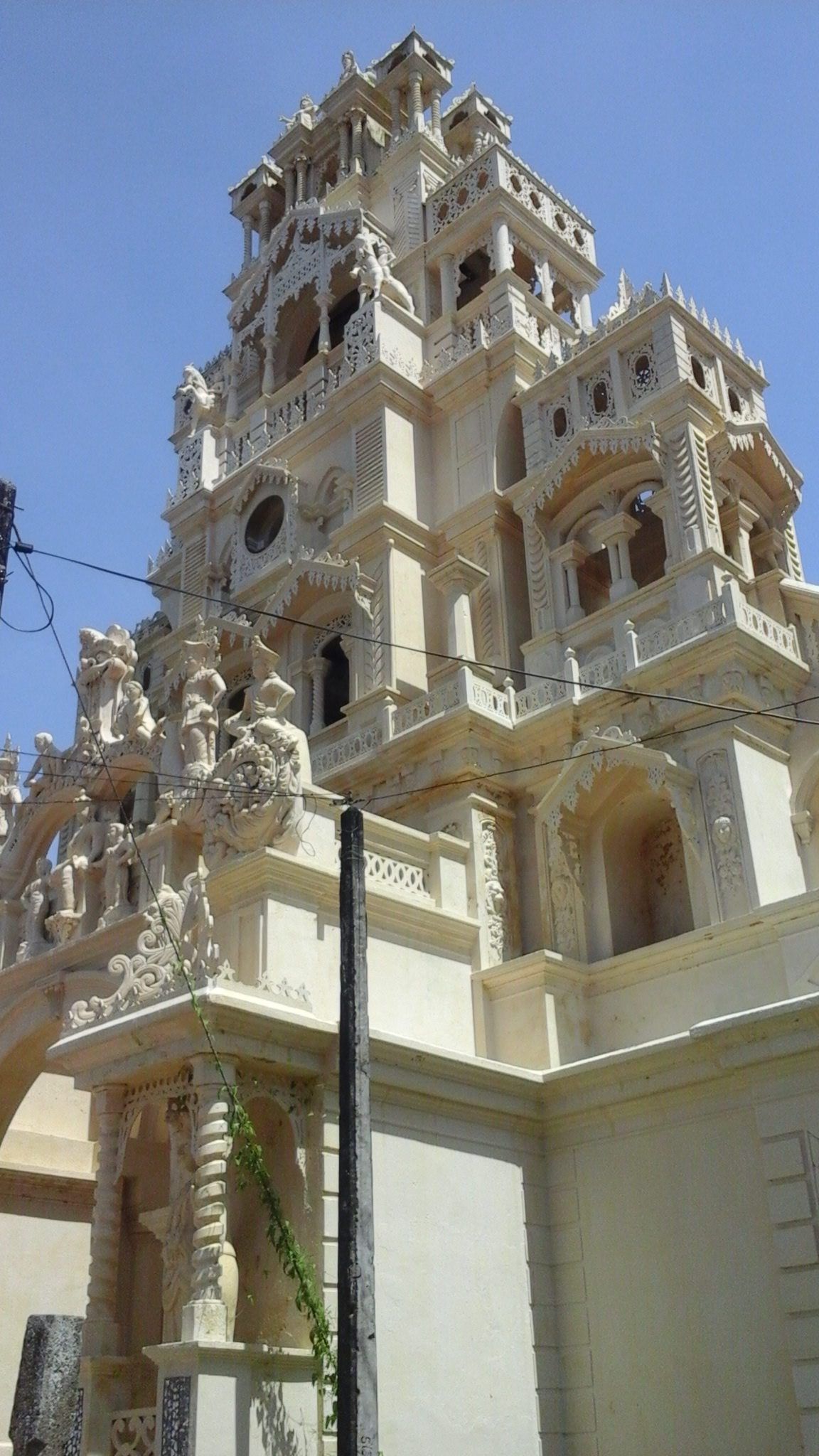
- Front arch at "Sunandarama Maha Vihara"

Religion
- Affiliation: Buddhism
- District: Galle
- Province: Southern Province

Location
- Location: Ambalangoda, Sri Lanka
- Country: Sri Lanka
- Interactive map of Sunandarama Maha Vihara
- Coordinates: 06°14′02.9″N 80°03′25.5″E

Architecture
- Type: Buddhist Temple
- Completed: around 1750
- Archaeological Protected Monument of Sri Lanka

Sunandarama Maha Vihara, also known as Maha pansala, is located in the southern part of Sri Lanka. It is situated 65 km (40 mi) south of Colombo, 36 km (22 mi) south of Galle and 200 m (660 ft) east from Ambalangoda railway station. The temple complex occupies nearly 2.0 ha (5 acres).

Traditionally this Vihara belongs to Vilegoda, Nambimulla, Maha Ambalangoda and Paniyanduwa which are known as Sathara peruwa (the four states which are benefited by the Vihara). Since early days these states have been provided the support to maintain the Vihara. Early before this place became a vicar, it was known that Ganninanselaya stayed here.

Sunandarama Vihara has been interred in two stories which are known as Maluwa. The sermon hall (Dharmashalawa), monastery (Awasa), saīmaāgaeya and alms hall (Dhana shalawa) are situated in the lower tier while the Vihara, Sacred Bodhi and Statue house are located on the upper. The sacred Bodhi is a shrine in this Vihara.

== History ==
The temple dates back to the 18th century BCE. In 1750, the Bodhi was planted according to a belief. In that time this temple was a residence for nuns. But Sunandarama Maha Vihara systematically started in 1970. Vilegoda Punnasara thero's moving from Aluthwala Nanadarama shrine was the starting of Sunandarama Vihara shrine. Vilegoda Punnasara thero had eleven clerical students.

The statue house is the most ancient building which belongs to Kandyan era. According to artist Manju Sri, the main stone door frame and the right hand side door frame of statue house was created by Thotagamu temple artists. It seems that the present statue is older than the statue house created in 1803.

Recumbent statue and the standing statue included in the hall's walls and the ceiling was created by P.N Jakolis who lived in Galle and his two assistant artists. The Bell shaped cairn was created in 1843. Synagogue was built in 1846 and two storied building was constructed in 1893. The small statue house on the second floor was built in 1886; a marble Buddha statue which is placed in that hall is a gift from Burma.

== Frescoes ==
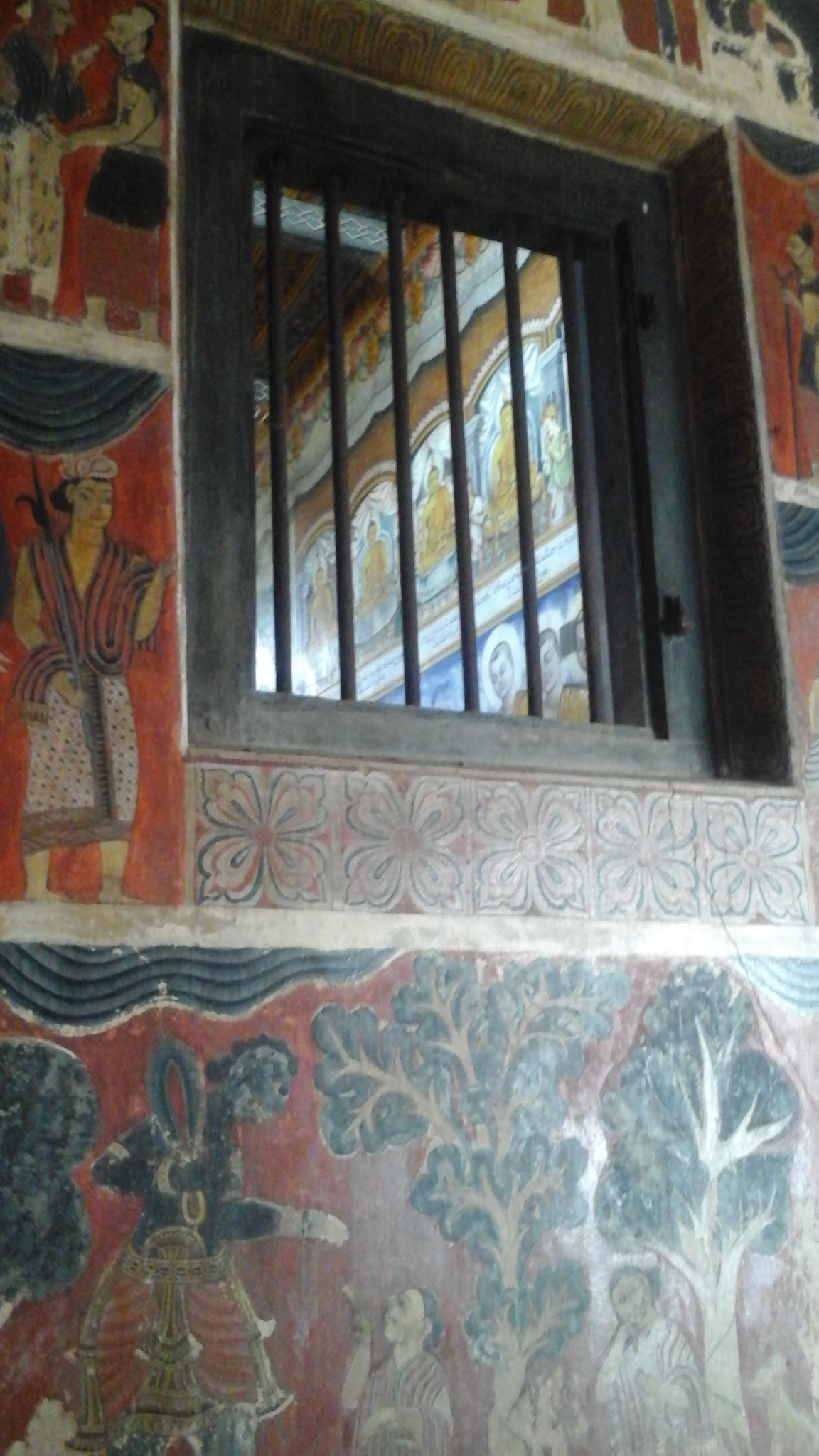
Frescoes at Sunandarama Vihara

The artistic murals in the Sunandharama Vihara are notable examples of ancient Sri Lankan art and crafts. These frescoes are similar to the frescoes at "Thotagamu Vihara", which were sketched by an artist from Sathara Koralaya (an area consisted of four states of the up country side of Sri Lanka) around 1805.

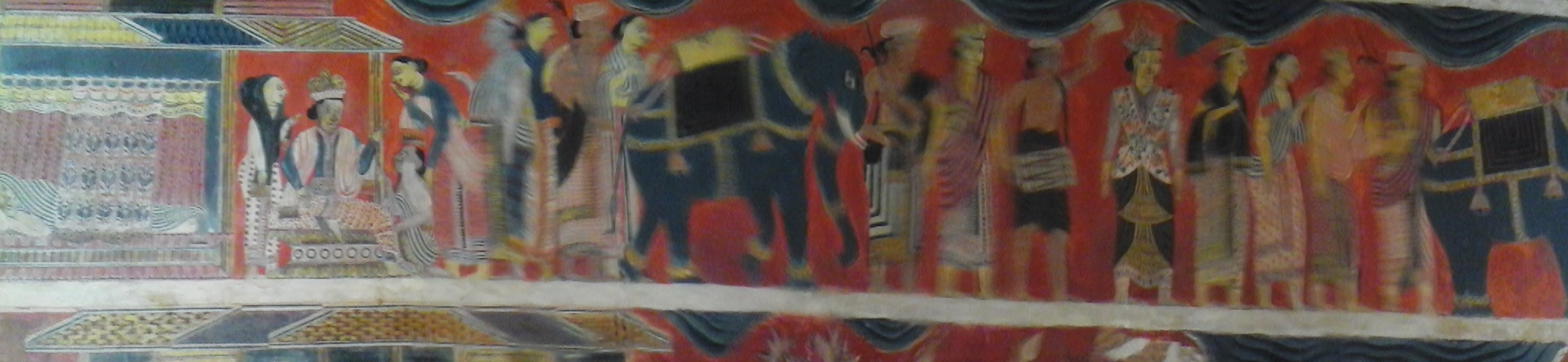
Frescoese at "Sunandarama Vihara":Panoramic View

These frescoes portray sundry Jathaka Stories (the stories which portray previous birth stories of Buddha) like Vessanthara, Sachchankira and Mandhathu jathaka stories, including the Vessanthara Jathaka story. Even though hill country tradition is local to the hill country temples' artwork the frescoes here belong to the hill country tradition. Red, brown, black and blue are the main colours used in these murals.

== Picturesque arch ==
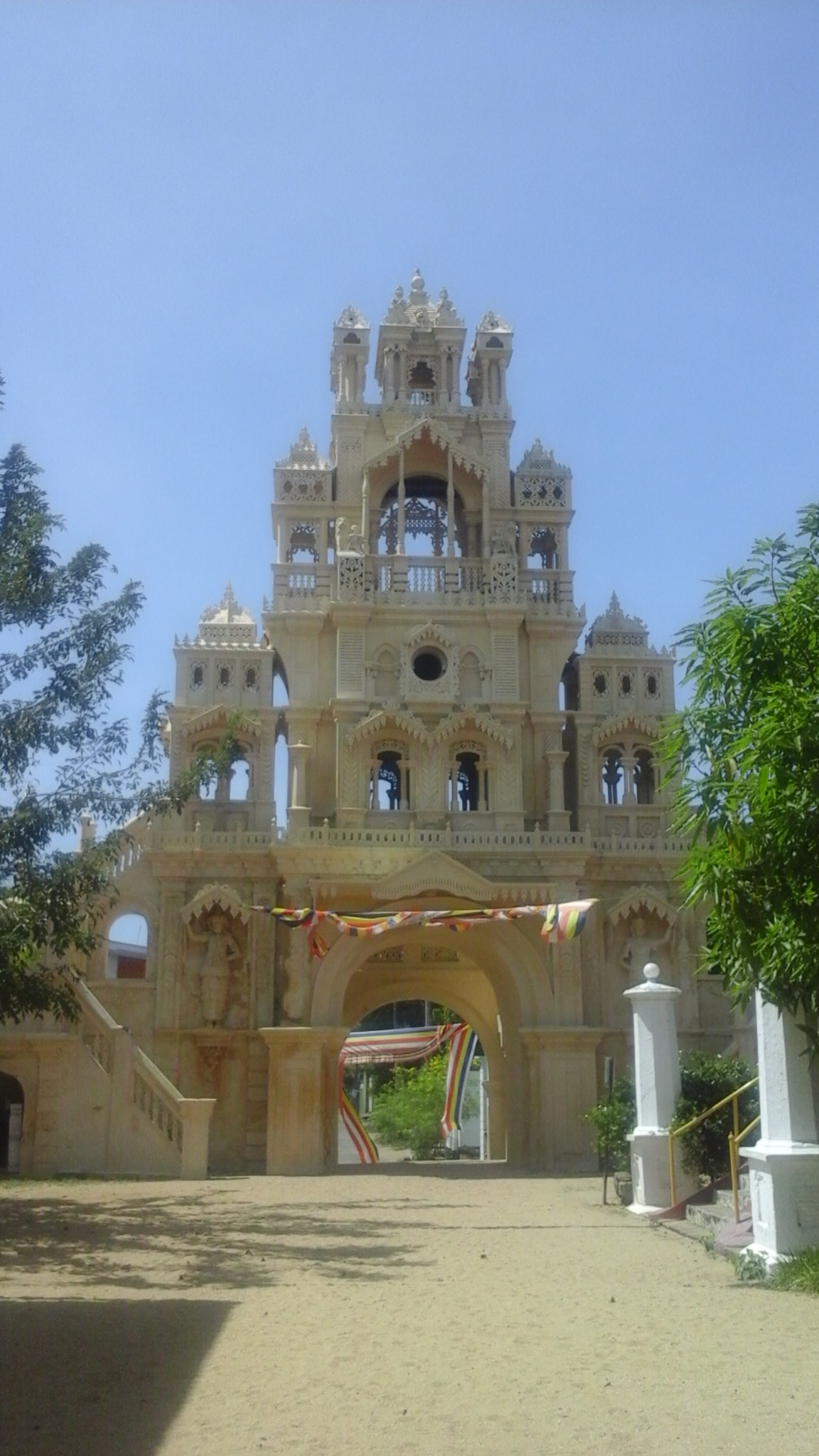
Front arch at Sunandarama Vihara

The bell arch or the picturesque Pandal is the most significant creation of this Vihara. This is the only concrete arch with this amount of precise carvings in Sri Lanka, and is 30 m (98 ft) high and 18 m (59 ft) wide.

Ancient security figures and Makara Thorana (a pandal with a figure of a dragon) are carved for four stories. For every storey six security caves have been created. So this depicts a whole security squad for the Vihara.

A mechanical bell has been attached for the third floor and it weighs 250 kg (550 lb). It works from a machine placed on the first floor. The sacred footprint of Buddha is carved on the fourth floor to enhance the dignity and respect towards Buddha.

The construction was begun in 1876 by Juanwanwadu Endoris De Silva. Various artists worked on this arch under his guidance. After the death of Endoris De Silva in 1895, his son took his place. However the construction took over 40 years to be completed.

To hold the weight of the three storied carvings, the base of the arch was constructed on a railway track with the help of the engineers of railway service. According to the resources, the cost of the construction was borne by local residents.

By the time, the arch was dragged for deterioration and a reconstruction committee was organised in 1988 with the help of local dignitaries. This was chaired by M. S. De Silva and P. E. Ariyasinghe was the secretary. Bernard Lokuge, Santhiyagu Upasiri, A. M. Karunarathne, A. M. Somapala De Silva, Bandu Wijesooriya, Sirisena Lokuge, Piyasena Peduruhewa and J. B. S. De Silva were among the committee members. Since then, its conservation and reconstruction work have been maintained by the locals.

== Gehenna ==
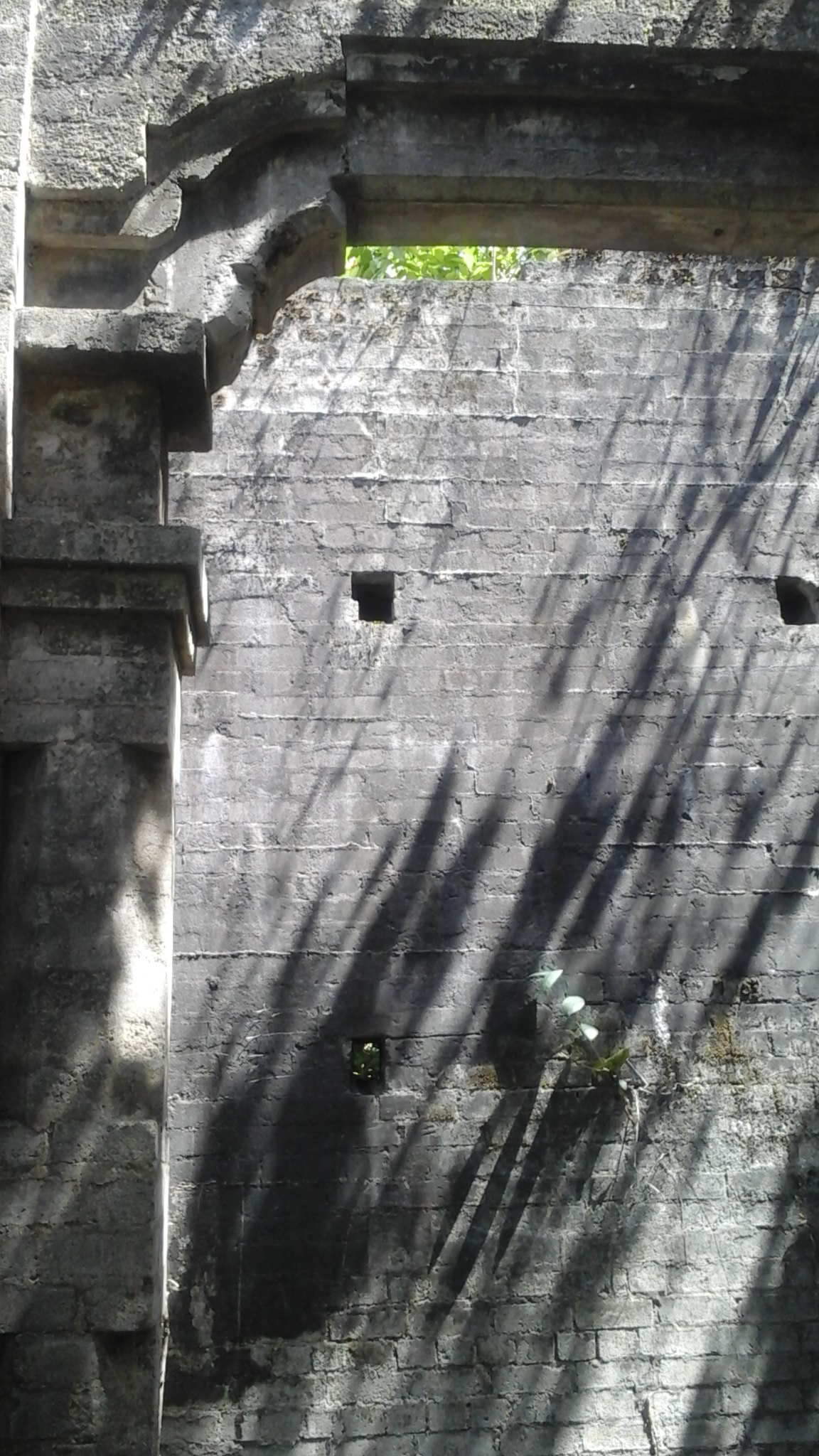
Gehenna at "Sunandarama Vihara"

Gehenna also known as hell was another creation in the Vihara. It is situated in the eastern side of the temple complex. It is a large concrete creation with basement Lkumbu (strong) hell and various tunnels there. Though its construction began in 1928, it has yet to see completion.

== Bodhi ==
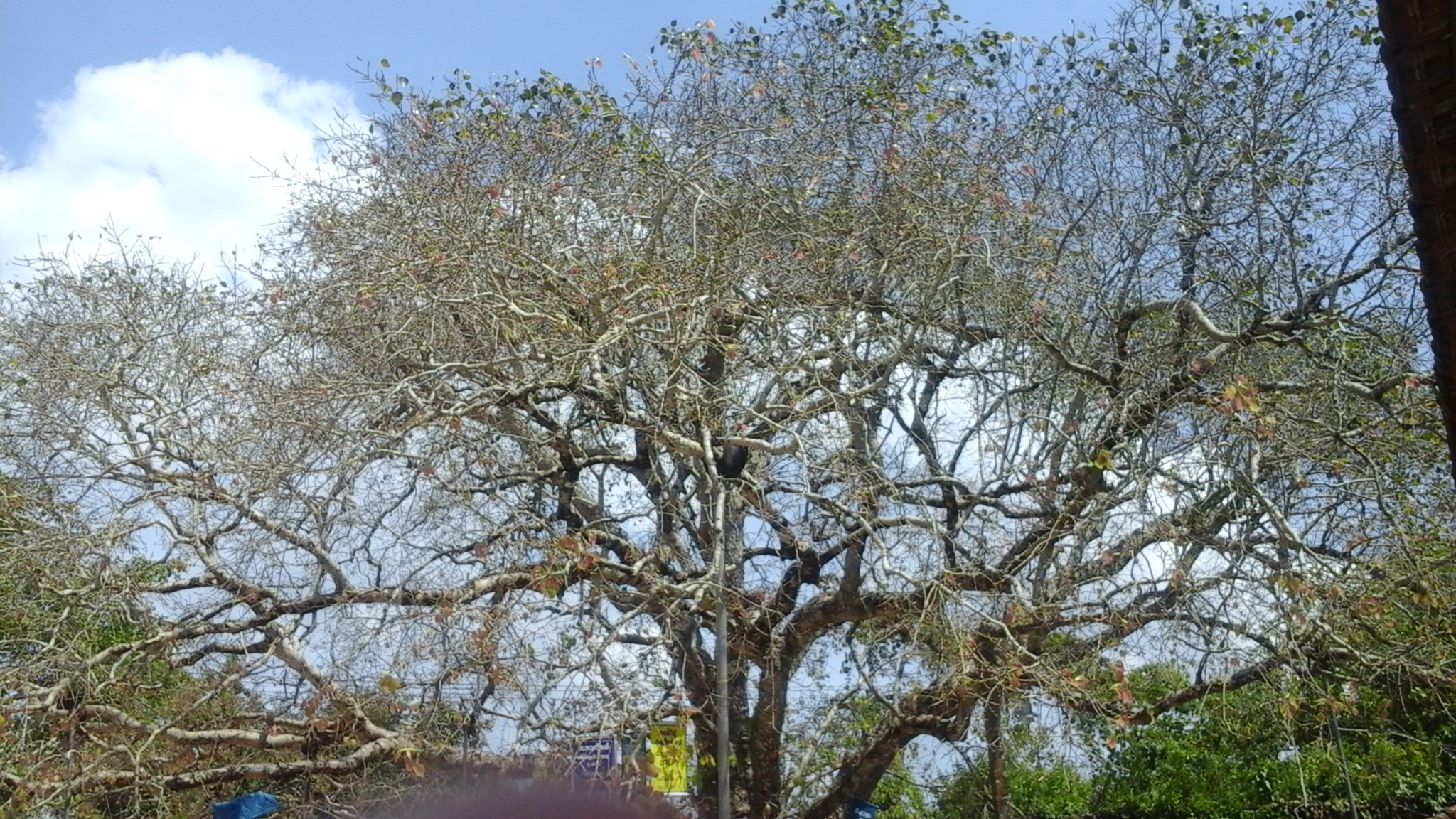
Bodhi at Sunandarama Vihara

The sacred Bodhi here is known to be one of the eight branches (plants) from the sacred Sri Maha Bodhi. This Bodhi is believed to have been planted around 1750, well before the construction of the temple.

== Conservation ==
Though the conservation of this temple complex was initiated in 1988 by the reconstruction committee for the arch, the locals are doing their best to conserve this piece of work for the generations to come. Much of the deteriorating frescoes have been subjected to reconstruction.

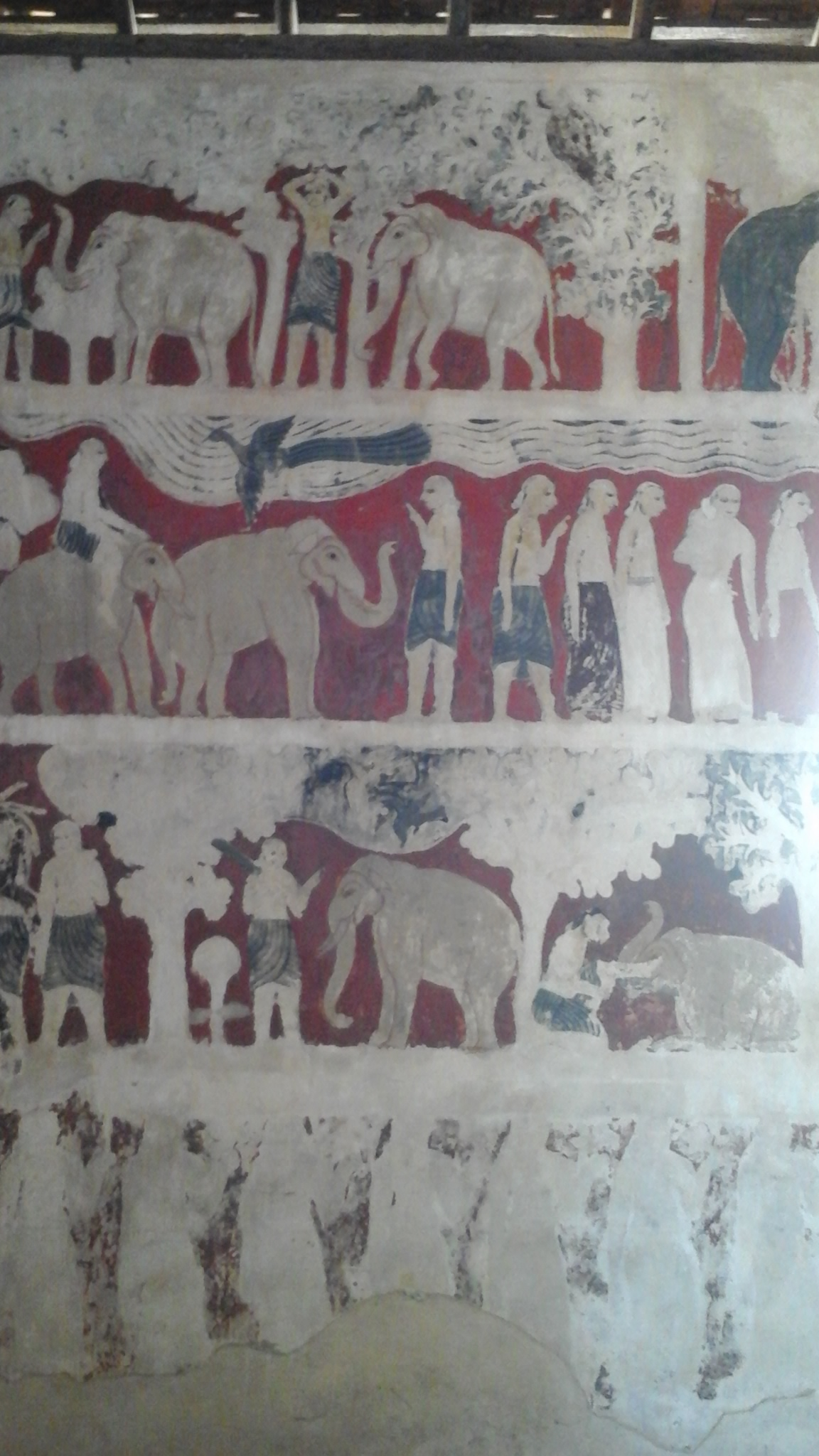
Frescoes convervation at "Sunandarama Vihara"

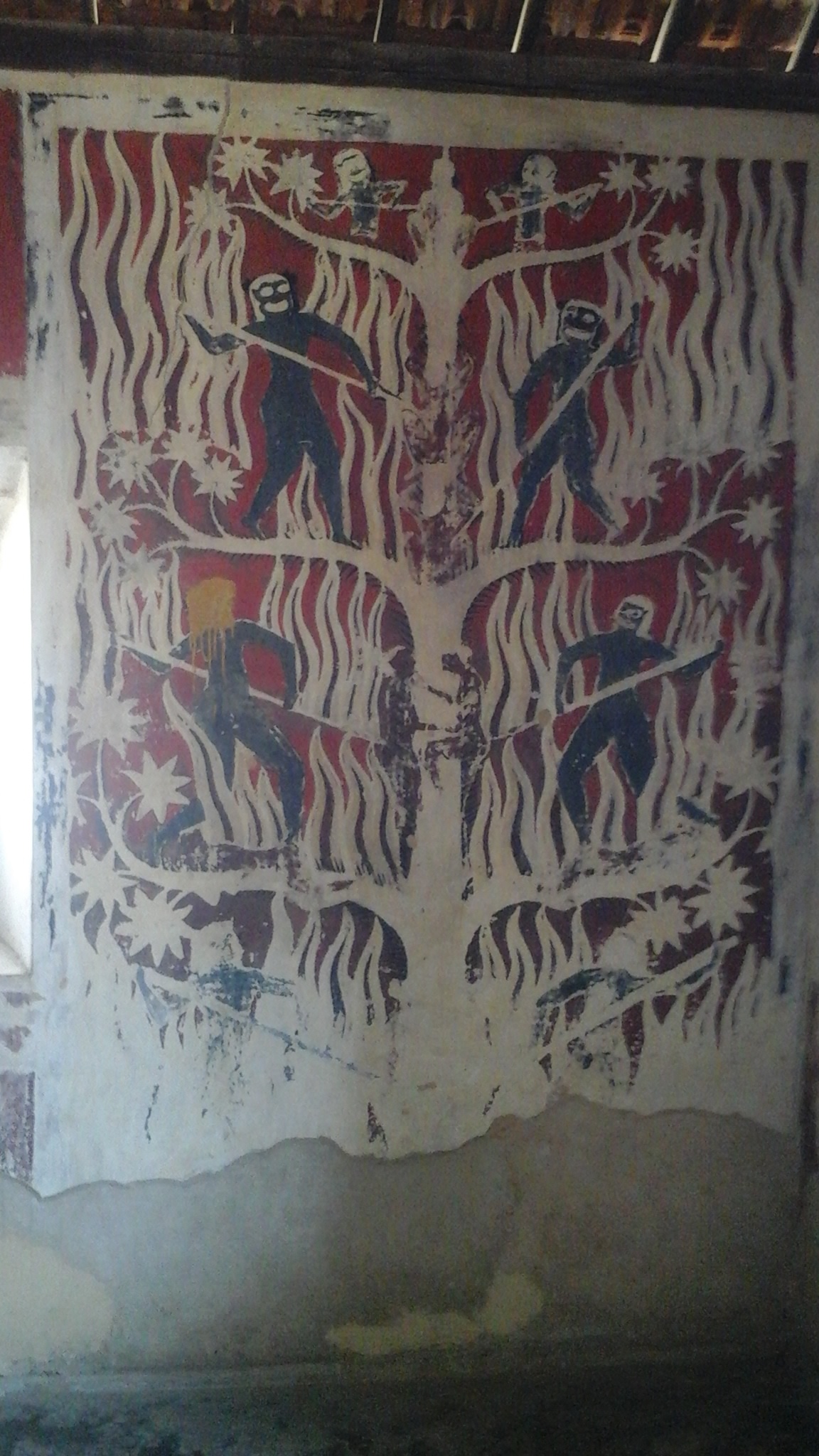
Frescoes convervation at "Sunandarama Vihara"

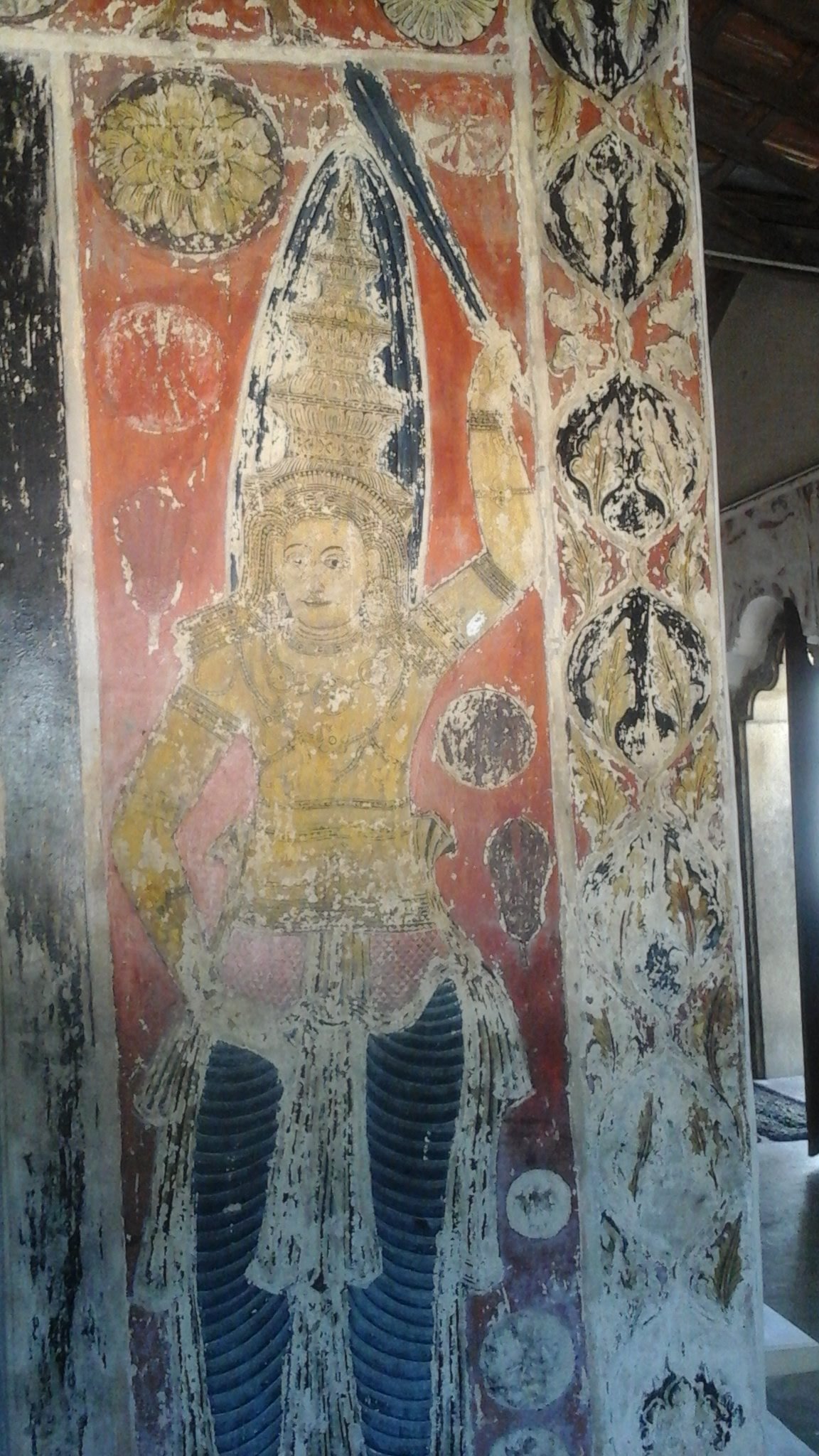
Frescoes convervation at "Sunandarama Vihara"

== Notes ==
- "PART I : SECTION (I) — GENERAL Government Notifications" (PDF). The Gazette of the Democratic Socialist Republic of Sri Lanka. 1811. 17 May 2013.
