= Murder of Yvonne Jonsson =

Murder at the Royal Park complex in Rajagiriya, Sri Lanka

Yvonne Jonsson
- Born: Yvonne Annette Jonsson; August 15, 1985
- Died: July 1, 2005 (aged 19); Rajagiriya, Sri Lanka.
- Cause of death: Strangulation
- Known for: Murdered by Jude Shramantha Jayamaha
- Relatives: Roger Jonsson (father); Chamalka Saparamadu Jonsson (mother); Caroline Jonsson (sister)

Yvonne Jonsson (died July 1, 2005) was a 19-year-old Swedish-Sri Lankan woman who was living in Sri Lanka at the time of her murder. She was beaten and fatally strangled by Jude Shramantha Anthony Jayamaha in the stairwell of the Royal Park Condominium complex in Rajagiriya, Sri Lanka.

Jonsson's murder case, often appearing in media as the Royal Park Murder, was highly publicised. It later received further public attention in 2019 due to Jayamaha receiving a presidential pardon issued by then President Maithripala Sirisena. Jayamaha expressed remorse for the murder in an open letter shortly after his pardon.

In 2024, the pardon was deemed unconstitutional and overturned by the Supreme Court of Sri Lanka. Jayamaha, who is suspected to have fled to Singapore in 2019, remains free and is yet to be extradited.

== Background ==
=== Yvonne Jonsson ===
Yvonne Jonsson was born on August 15, 1985 to Swedish national Roger Jonsson and Sri Lankan Chamalka (née Saparamadu) Jonsson.

Along with her sister and Jayamaha, Yvonne attended Colombo International School for the duration of her primary and secondary education, after which she emigrated to the United States of America to study fashion design.

=== Jude Shramantha Anthony Jayamaha ===
Jude Shramantha Jayamaha was born in 1985 to Preethi Jayamaha and Sandra (née Jennifer) Jayamaha, a wealthy family. His parents' marriage began to grow unstable a year after his birth, and in 1996 they divorced. After the divorce, Jayamaha lived with his father on Bagatalle Road.

Jayamaha had attended Wycherly International School, Colombo International School and the Australian College of Business and Technology (ACBT). According to his father, Jayamaha had been home on vacation from his higher education in Australia at the time of the murder.

Jayamaha was romantically involved with Yvonne's younger sister, Caroline, before the murder. Yvonne was strongly against their relationship; she called her mother several times from the United States to warn her against letting Caroline go out with Jayamaha. In spite of this, the relationship between seventeen-year-old Caroline and nineteen-year-old Jayamaha continued.

In his adolescence, Jayamaha displayed signs of aberrant and rebellious behaviour. Testifying before the Colombo Additional Magistrate, Caroline alleged that Jayamaha had made a Colombo International School student pregnant and had been previously suspended for bringing narcotics to the school. She also continued with their relationship despite being aware of Jayamaha's numerous other girlfriends.

== Discovery and arrest ==
At 9:30 a.m. on the morning of July 1, 2005, a body was discovered in the stairwell of the Royal Park Condominium complex in Rajagiriya by a domestic aide. The body was subsequently identified as Yvonne's by the manager of the apartment complex, who noted: "The body looked like that of a doll. I later managed to identify the body as that of Roger Jonsson’s daughter Yvonne. Her jeans had been pulled down to her ankles and wrapped around her neck."

Jayamaha was arrested on the evening of July 2 at the Jonsson's condominium, where he had been among the aggrieved Jonsson family and Yvonne's friends.

== Trial, conviction and reconstruction of events ==
After his arrest, Jayamaha was indicted in the High Court of Colombo for murder and was tried before a judge sitting without a jury. On July 28, 2006, he was instead found guilty of culpable homicide, for which he was sentenced to 12 years of rigorous imprisonment and fined 300,000 Sri Lankan rupees.

The prosecution, through investigation and forensic data, were able to reconstruct the events surrounding Yvonne's murder.

=== Night before the murder ===
On June 30, 2005, at 8:30 p.m., Yvonne and Caroline picked up Jayamaha from his home in Bagatale Road in Roger Jonsson's vehicle, in preparation for a night of bar-hopping. The group travelled back and forth between the White Horse Inn, located on Nawam Mawatha, a bar known as Glow, located in the building of the Automobile Association of Ceylon, and The Blue Elephant at the Hilton Colombo.

The group then returned to the Hilton, where they remained for only 10 minutes before reclaiming Yvonne's car from the valet. Caroline alleges that at some point during the night she had argued with Jayamaha, after which Yvonne blamed him for Caroline's emotional distress. However, Jayamaha's legal counsel maintained that the argument had begun over Caroline talking to an individual named Pavithra, and that Yvonne had taken Jayamaha's side.

Yvonne returned to Glow with a friend shortly thereafter. Caroline and Jayamaha returned to the Jonsson's condominium by cab, arriving at 2:02 a.m. on the morning of July 1st. Upon arriving in her parents' condominium on the 23rd floor, Caroline misinformed her parents that she had returned with Yvonne. Caroline and Jayamaha then briefly stayed in Caroline's room, where Caroline made a phone call to Yvonne's friend to inquire about her. Jayamaha maintained that he and Caroline had sex in her bedroom, whereas Caroline alleged that they argued again. Jayamaha hired a taxi over his phone before leaving the condominium between 2:20 and 2:30 a.m

=== Murder of Yvonne Jonsson ===
Yvonne returned to the Royal Park Condominium complex at 2:50 a.m. The attack began after Yvonne exited the elevator on the 23rd floor. Jayamaha forced Yvonne to the staircase, leading Yvonne to drop articles of clothing in the ensuing struggle. Jayamaha then bashed her head against the edge of a step several times.

Yvonne had been dragged down four flights of stairs and was found on the steps of the 19th floor. The cause of death was determined to be asphyxiation by a pair of stretch pants worn by the deceased, which had been fashioned into a ligature by bending the victim's legs backwards.

A partial palm impression in blood matching Jayamaha was found on the banister near Yvonne's body.

=== After the murder ===
Jayamaha confessed to bathing in the pool at Royal Park after the murder to wash off evidence of the murder from his person.

Jayamaha's taxi arrived between 3:25 and 3:30 a.m., along with his friend, Shafraz Rilvan Mohamed. The driver of the taxi and Mohamed later independently testified that Jayamaha appeared dressed only in a pair of boxer shorts and shirt, carrying a pair of folded trousers, with no visible blood on his person.

Caroline alleged that after the morning of July 1st, Jayamaha deviated from his habitual and frequent contact with her. She received no phone calls from him for the next one and a half days, despite usually receiving several calls from him daily. Jayamaha also did not visit Caroline until the 2nd of July.

== Failed appeal and death sentence ==
Jayamaha submitted for appeal on September 21, 2011 and July 22, 2012, and in response the Attorney General petitioned for an increase in his sentencing, from rigorous imprisonment to capital punishment, by way of finding Jayamaha guilty of murder, reversing the original conviction of culpable homicide.

The matter of appeal was presided by judges W. L. Ranjith Silva and Nalin Perera, and argued on March 16, March 19 and May 3, 2012. Both appeals from Jayamaha and the Attorney General were disposed by a "single judgement common to both appeals, binding on both parties."

During the proceedings, both the prosecution and appellant's counsel revisited facts, evidence and testimony from the 2006 case. Evidence submitted during the appeal hearing suggested that Jayamaha had been intoxicated on the night of Yvonne's murder, and the determination as to the degree of Jayamaha's intoxication was instrumental in reversing the judgement of culpable homicide.

=== Sentenced to death ===
The presiding judge, reviewing the actions and precautions that Jayamaha undertook during and shortly after Yvonne's murder, found that they did not fit the judgement of culpable homicide. The judge noted that Jayamaha's actions, such as bathing in the pool and disposing of his bloodied apparel, were not those of an extremely intoxicated individual.

Jayamaha was subsequently found guilty of murder, and his sentence was increased to death. The sentencing was upheld by the Supreme Court in 2014 after Jayamaha appealed once again.

== Presidential pardon ==
On November 9, 2019, Jude Shramantha Jayamaha was granted a presidential pardon by Maithripala Sirisena during his last week in office. Jayamaha was discharged from Kuruvita Prison, where he had been incarcerated since 2012, the same day.

In a press release from the President's Media Division, it was stated that the pardon had been granted based on the recommendations of Buddhist religious leaders Ven Rathana Thero, Ven Baddegama Samitha Thero and Ven Dr Keradewala Punnarathana Nayake Thero. The President's Media Division also claimed that Reverend Raymond Wickramasinghe, the Bishop of Galle, had written to endorse the pardon for Jayamaha. On November 11, 2019, Reverend Wickramasinghe issued a statement in which he clarified the endorsement, made a few years prior to the pardon, had advocated for the general rehabilitation of prisoners and did not specifically mention Jayamaha.

=== Jayamaha's open letter ===
On November 14, 2019, shortly after his release from Kuruwita Prison, Jayamaha penned an open letter addressed to the public of Sri Lanka. In this letter, Jayamaha deemed his behaviour during his youth a product of his unstable childhood.

In part of his letter specifically addressed to the Jonsson family, Jayamaha expresses his remorse and grief for having killed Yvonne, and his desire to "keep on trying to make amends".

Part of Jayamaha's letter is also reserved for addressing societal concerns towards his release. He claims that his higher education and attainment of a BSc in Economics from the London School of Economics, an MSc in Business from the Open University of Sri Lanka and the approaching completion of his PhD attests to his successful rehabilitation.

Jayamaha closed his letter with a brief timeline of his incarceration.

=== Reactions and controversy ===
Janatha Vimukthi Peramuna leader and presidential candidate Anura Kumara Dissanayake deemed the pardon "an illegal and unjustifiable move by President Maithripala Sirisena". Presidential candidate Sajith Premadasa promised to overturn the pardon if elected.

Yvonne's sister Caroline has publicly spoken out against the pardon, noting that Jayamaha "shows no remorse".

=== Pardon overturned ===
On June 6, 2024, The Supreme Court of Sri Lanka overturned the pardon, which it deemed unconstitutional. The Supreme Court further instructed the Attorney General to initiate the process of Jayamaha's extradition, who fled the country in 2019 and is currently presumed to be in hiding in Singapore.

== Sources ==
- Fernando, Shamindra (July 4, 2005a). "Suspect arrested at the scene of the crime: Royal park killing: Rape ruled out". The Island.
- Gamage, Anjana (July 6, 2005). "'Mama don't worry Yvonne will come home'". Daily News. Archived from the original on February 21, 2024.
- de Silva, Marisa; Fuard, Asif (July 10, 2005). "Night of clubbing ends in brutal killing". Sunday Times. Archived from the original on February 26, 2024.
- Fernando, Shamindra (July 17, 2005b). "Royal Park killing: A case of cocaine, marijuana, ecstasy and fast life". The Island.
- Najmuddin, Jamila (July 30, 2006). "Guilty". The Sunday Leader. Archived from the original on January 17, 2020.
- Jansz, Frederica (August 6, 2006). "My son is innocent says Shramantha's mom". The Sunday Leader. Archived from the original on November 15, 2020.
- Perera, Upeka Erangani (September 5, 2006). "Royal Park murder case: I did not read affidavit, I just signed it - Preethi Jayamaha". Daily News. Archived from the original on February 16, 2020.
- Silva, W. L.; Perera, N (July 11, 2012), Don. Shamantha Jude Anthony Jayama V Attorney General, Court of Appeal of Sri Lanka, archived from the original on July 15, 2024
- Selvanayagam, S. S. (July 12, 2012). "Death sentence in Royal Park Murder appeal". Daily Mirror.
- "Supreme Court upholds death sentence for convict in Yvonne Johnson murder". News First. June 9, 2014. Archived from the original on June 6, 2021.
- "Royal Park murder; Prisons Dept. receives presidential pardon document". Daily Mirror. November 9, 2019. Archived from the original on January 21, 2020.
- "Outrage as Sri Lanka president pardons teen's killer". BBC. November 10, 2019. Archived from the original on May 31, 2023.
- "Media Release". President's Media Division. November 11, 2019.
- "Sri Lanka President says pardon to convicted killer was granted on the request of religious leaders". Colombo Page. November 11, 2019a. Archived from the original on November 11, 2019.
- Wickramasinghe, Raymond (November 11, 2019). "A clarification". Letter to the public.
- "JVP objects to presidential pardon to Royal Park murder convict", Colombo Page, November 12, 2019b, archived from the original on November 16, 2019
- Jayamaha, Jude Shramantha (November 14, 2019). "An open letter to Sri Lanka". Letter to the Jonsson family and the people of Sri Lanka. Archived from the original on May 17, 2022.
- "After Swede killer's pardon, Sri Lanka frees 267 more prisoners". France24. November 14, 2019. Archived from the original on March 24, 2023.
- "Sri Lanka's Supreme Court overturns presidential pardon for Park Royal murder". Tamil Guardian. Sri Lanka. 7 July 2024. Archived from the original on June 8, 2024.
