= Dharmasoka College =

Public school in Ambalangoda, Sri Lanka

Dharmasoka College, Ambalangoda

Location
- Ambalangoda; Sri Lanka
- 6°14′25″N 80°03′14″E

Information
- Type: Public
- Motto: විද්‍යා දදාති විනයං (Buddhist quote in the Dhammapada. Meaning: "Knowledge generates humility")
- Established: 1913
- Founder: Mudalindu S. Thomas De Silva Esq.
- Principal: K.A.D. Karunarathne
- Staff: ≈200
- Grades: class 1 to 13
- Gender: Co-educational
- Age range: 6 to 19
- Enrollment: ≈4150
- Language: Sinhala, English
- Colours: Blue and Silver
- Nickname: Sokian
- Affiliation: Buddhist
- Website: www.dharmasokacollege.lk

Dharmasoka College is a coed school in Sri Lanka. The college was established in 1913.

It was supported by the Buddhist Theosophical Society led by Colonel Henry Steel Olcott, and accordingly is one of Sri Lanka's oldest schools. It provides primary and secondary education.

== Location and size ==
Dharmasoka College is situated in Ambalangoda within the administrative district of Galle, Sri Lanka. It currently has over 5,500 students and approximately 250 members of the academic staff.

== History ==
In 1913, the college was established with fifteen students by its founder, Mudliar Santiago Thomas de Silva, who spent his own wealth to establish and develop the college.

On 10 April 1929, the Sugatha Sasanodaya Samithiya (a benevolent society) took over administration of the college. The government of Sri Lanka took control of the college in 1961. Some managers under Sugatha Sasanodaya Samithiya were P. de S. Kularatne, Dr. M. H Saddhasena and L. C. de Silva, all were former Members of Parliament.

Approximately 150 students are selected to the local universities in each year.

Dharmasoka College students are called Sokians.

== Notable alumni ==
- Mahinda Deshapriya, former chairman of the Election Commission of Sri Lanka
- Sarath Fonseka (Field Marshal), Former Commander of the Sri Lanka Army(GENERAL), Former Chief of the Defence Staff, Presidential Candidate in 2010(lose), Member of Parliament for Colombo District, Cabinet Minister for Regional Development.
- Rohana Wijeweera, Presidential Candidate in 1982, Founder of the Janatha Vimukthi Peramuna, Leader of the 1971 JVP Insurrection and 1987–89 JVP Insurrection
- Jayalath Weerakkody, Former Air Force Commander and Former Sri Lankan High Commissioner to Pakistan
- Upul Tharanga, Test/ODI Cricketer
- Dinesh Chandimal, Test/ODI Cricketer
- Gunadasa Kapuge, Veternent Musician
- C. P. de Silva, Former Civil Servant, Former Cabinet Minister
- Sunil Handunnetti, Member of Parliament for Colombo District
- Buddhika Kurukularatne, journalist and former Member of Parliament for Galle District
- Shan Wijayalal De Silva, Chief Minister of Southern Province of Sri Lanka
- L. H. Sumanadasa, Vice Chancellor of the University of Ceylon and founder of the University of Moratuwa
- Ajit de Silva, Former Test cricketer
- Saman Jayantha, Former National Cricketer
- Admiral Piyal De Silva, Commander, Sri Lanka Navy.
- Dilshan De Silva, Secretary of Sri Lanka Schools Cricket Association
