= Ambalangoda Urban Council =

Local authority in Sri Lanka

Type
- Type: Local authority

Leadership
- Chairman: Godahewa Asela Prasanna, (NPP) since 6 May 2025
- Deputy Chairman: Sarathchandra De Silva, (NPP) since 6 May 2025

Structure
- Seats: 22
- Political groups: Government: NPP (11); Opposition: SJB (5); SLPP (3); UNP (1); SB (1); Independents (1)

Elections
- Voting system: open list proportional representation system
- Last election: 6 May 2025
- Next election: TBA

Website
- http://ambalangoda.uc.gov.lk

Ambalangoda Urban Council (AUC) is the local authority for the town of Ambalangoda in the Galle District, Southern Province, Sri Lanka. The AUC is responsible for providing a variety of local public services including roads, sanitation, drains, housing, libraries, public parks and recreational facilities. It has 12 councillors elected using an open list proportional representation system.

The Ambalangoda Urban Council governs:

- Nine villages,
- Eight Grama Niladhari Divisions (GN)
- Twelve electoral wards.

== Election results ==
2018 Local Government Election

The 2018 local government election was held on 10 February by the Election Commission of Sri Lanka. The official results were started to announce on election day night itself after the polling closed island wide.

Alliances and Parties	Votes	%	Seats
Sri Lanka Podujana Peramuna (SLPP)	6,698	47.30	10
United National Party (UNP)	4,260	30.03	6
United People's Freedom Alliance (UPFA)	1,796	12.68	3
Janatha Vimukthi Peramuna (JVP)	1,062	7.5	2
United National Freedom Front	344	2.43	0
Valid Votes	14,160	100	21
Rejected Votes	338		
Total Polled	14,498		
Registered Electors	18,748		
Turnout	77.33%		

=== 2011 Local Government Election ===
Results of the local government election held on 17 March 2011:

Alliances and parties	Votes	%	Seats
United People's Freedom Alliance (NC, ACMC, SLFP et al.)	6,772	56.32	8
United National Party	4,801	39.93	4
People's Liberation Front	440	3.66	0
Sinhalaye Mahasammatha Bhoomiputhra Pakshaya	11	0.09	0
Valid Votes	12,024	100.00	12
Rejected Votes	428		
Total Polled	12,452		
Registered Electors	16,618		
Turnout	74.93%		
