= Electroplasticity =

Electrochemistry concept

Electroplasticity, describes the enhanced plastic behavior of a solid material under the application of an electric field. This electric field could be internal, resulting in current flow in conducting materials, or external. The effect of electric field on mechanical properties ranges from simply enhancing existing plasticity, such as reducing the flow stress in already ductile metals, to promoting plasticity in otherwise brittle ceramics. The exact mechanisms that control electroplasticity vary based on the material and the exact conditions (e.g., temperature, strain rate, grain size, etc.). Enhancing the plasticity of materials is of great practical interest as plastic deformation provides an efficient way of transforming raw materials into final products. The use of electroplasticity to improve processing of materials is known as electrically assisted manufacturing.

== History ==
Electroplasticity was first discovered by Eugene S. Machlin, who reported in 1959 that applying an electric field made NaCl weaker and more ductile. Since then, the effect of electric fields on plasticity has been studied in many materials systems including metal, ceramics, and semiconductors. Various mechanisms have been posited to explain electroplastic effects and their dependence on materials properties and external conditions. For most materials the electroplastic effect arises from a combination of multiple mechanisms. This should not be all that surprising given that the electric fields directly affect electrons which dictate the bonding in materials and therefore all higher level phenomena such as dislocation motion, flow stress, vacancy diffusion, etc.

== Electroplasticity in Metals ==
The application of DC electric fields is known to reduce the flow stress of metals and metal alloys while increasing the fracture strain. Several mechanisms have been put forth to explain this effect including Joule heating, electron wind force, dissolution of metallic bonds, and unpinning of dislocations due the induction of magnetic fields. None of these mechanisms on their own can sufficiently explain the full extent of electroplasticity in metals. The application of electric fields has been shown to enhance the effect of superplasticity which occurs in polycrystalline metals at high homologous temperatures (T>0.5Tm). This is likely due to the electric field reducing cavitation, which can lead to premature fracture, and grain growth, which can prevent superplastic flow due to grain boundary sliding, in addition to reducing the activation energy for grain boundary sliding. The strength of the electroplastic effect scales with the magnitude of the applied electric field past some threshold value. While the application of an electric field typically augments the plasticity of metals there are alloy systems that show a reduction in plasticity. Conrad and Li found that the activation energy for grain boundary sliding in Zn-5 wt.% Al increased by nearly 20% under the application of a 2 $\ce{kV cm^{-1}}$ DC electric field, resulting in more difficult deformation.

== Electroplasticity in Ceramics ==
The application of electric fields to ceramics can give rise to plasticity in materials that traditionally exhibit no plastic deformation. High homologous temperatures are, however, typically necessary to achieve significant plastic deformation in ceramic materials. Plastic deformation ceramic oxides was found by Conrad et al. to occur under relatively modest electric field strengths (0.02-0.32 $\ce{kV cm^{-1}}$). Strain-mediating defects such as vacancies and dislocations tend to be charged in ceramic materials due to the ionic or covalent nature of bonding. Thus, the movement of electrons can have a direct impact on the mobility of these defects in ceramics and subsequent plastic deformation. The primary effect of the electric field in the deformation of fine-grained ceramic oxides is to shift the diffusion pathway from bulk diffusion to grain boundary diffusion, resulting in greater diffusion and easier grain boundary sliding.
