= Rajagiriya Flyover =

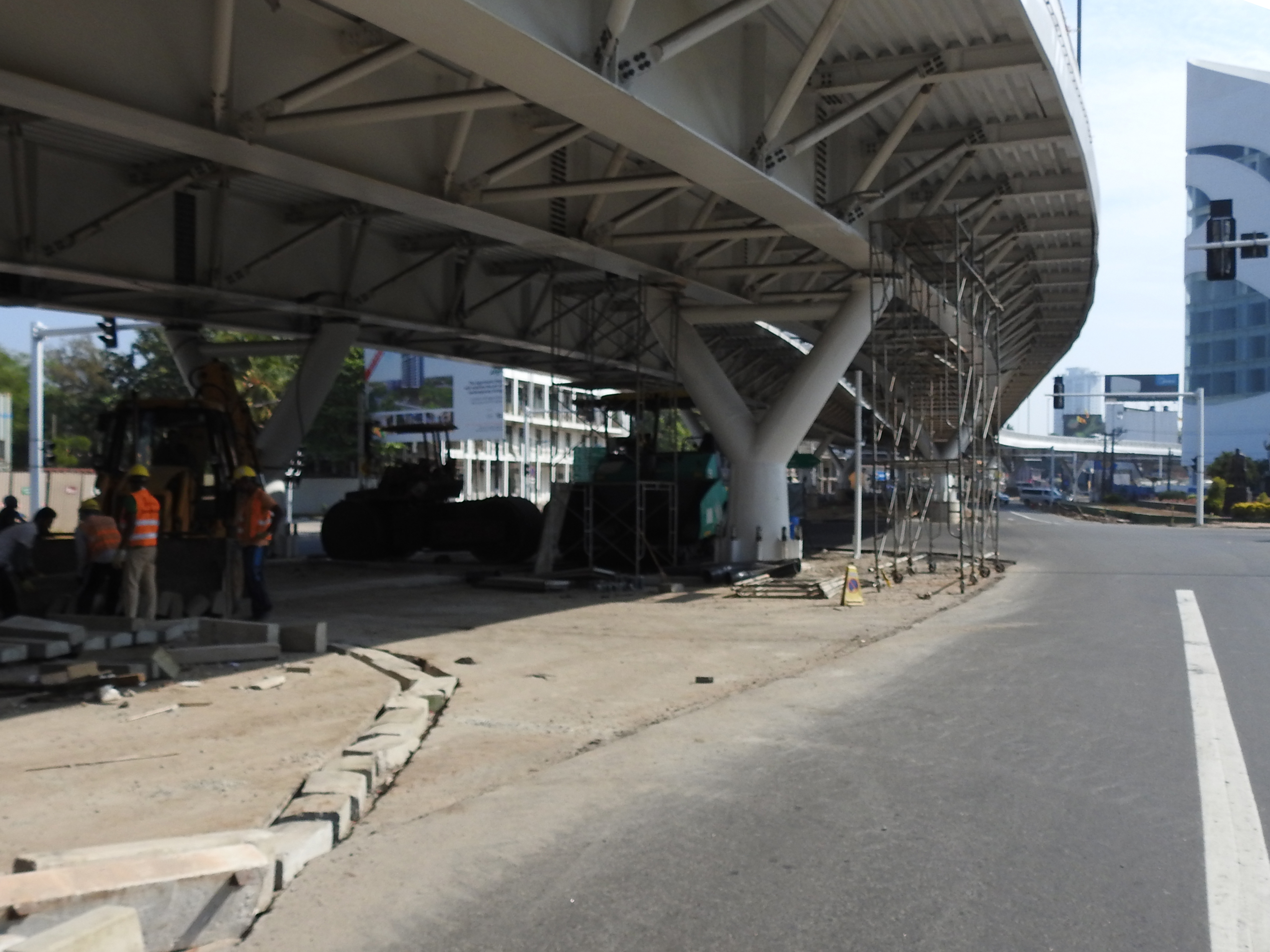
- The flyover under construction in February 2018.
- Coordinates: 06°54′33″N 79°53′46″E
- Crosses: Rajagiriya Junction
- Locale: Rajagiriya
- Owner: RDA

Characteristics
- Total length: 533 m (1,749 ft)
- Width: 21.4 m (70 ft)
- No. of spans: 2

History
- Engineering design by: Access Engineering
- Construction cost: Rs. 4.7 billion
- Opened: 8 January 2018

The Rajagiriya Flyover (also referred to as the Rajagiriya Bridge) is a flyover built over Sri Jayawardenepura Mawatha in Rajagiriya, Sri Lanka. It is the longest flyover in the country. Initial designing and construction was conducted by Access Engineering on 6 June 2016, with the flyover officially opening to the public on 8 January 2018 during an inaugural ceremony with the presence of the President of Sri Lanka Maithripala Sirisena.

The flyover cost a total of Rs.4.7 billion and measures 533 m (1,749 ft) long, 21.4 m (70 ft) wide, and consists of a total of four lanes over two spans.

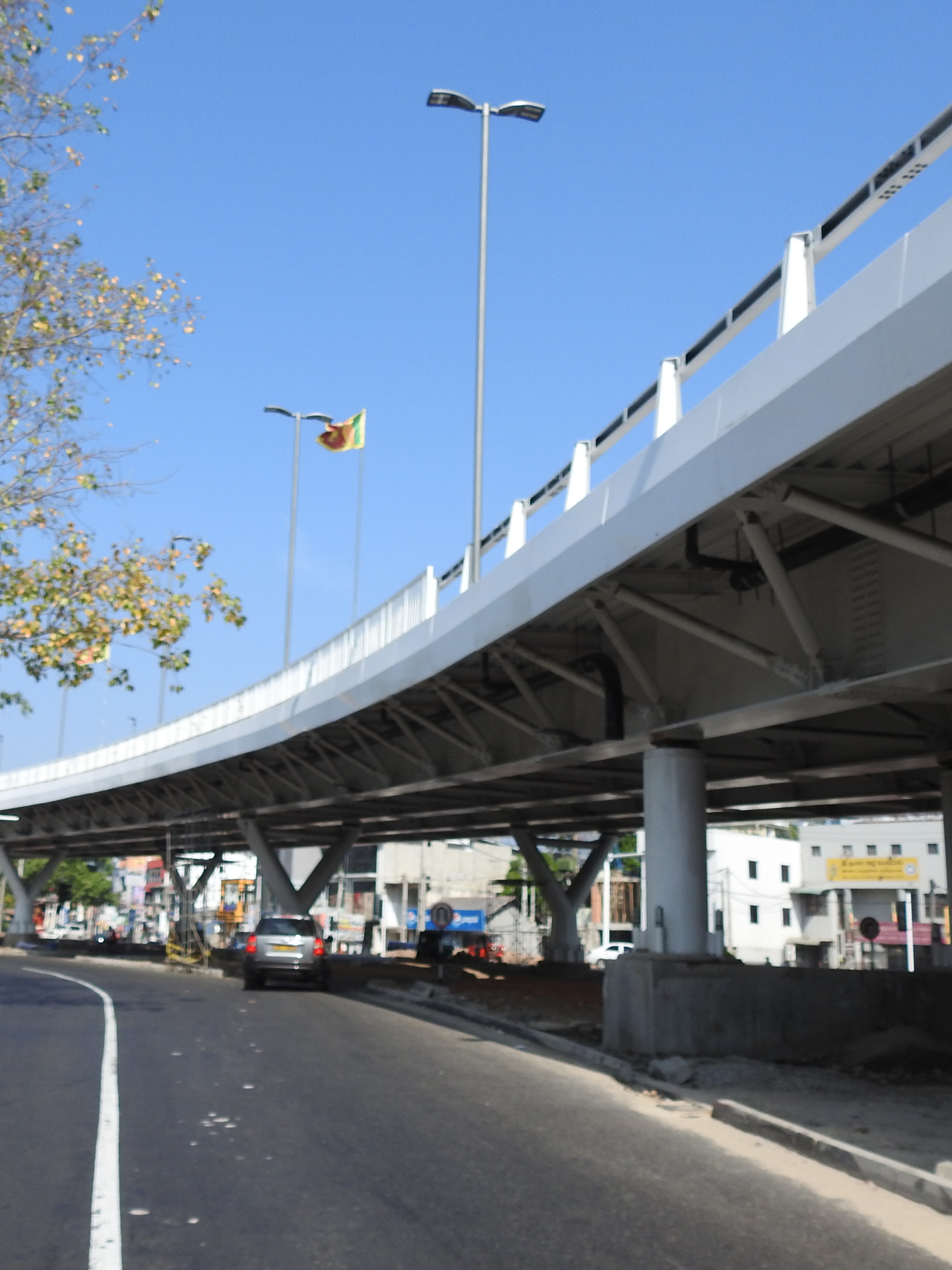
Part of the flyover under construction in February 2018.

== See also ==
- List of A-Grade highways in Sri Lanka
