= Ambalangoda =

Ambalangoda Sinhala: අම්බලන්ගොඩ Tamil: அம்பலாங்கொட
- Town
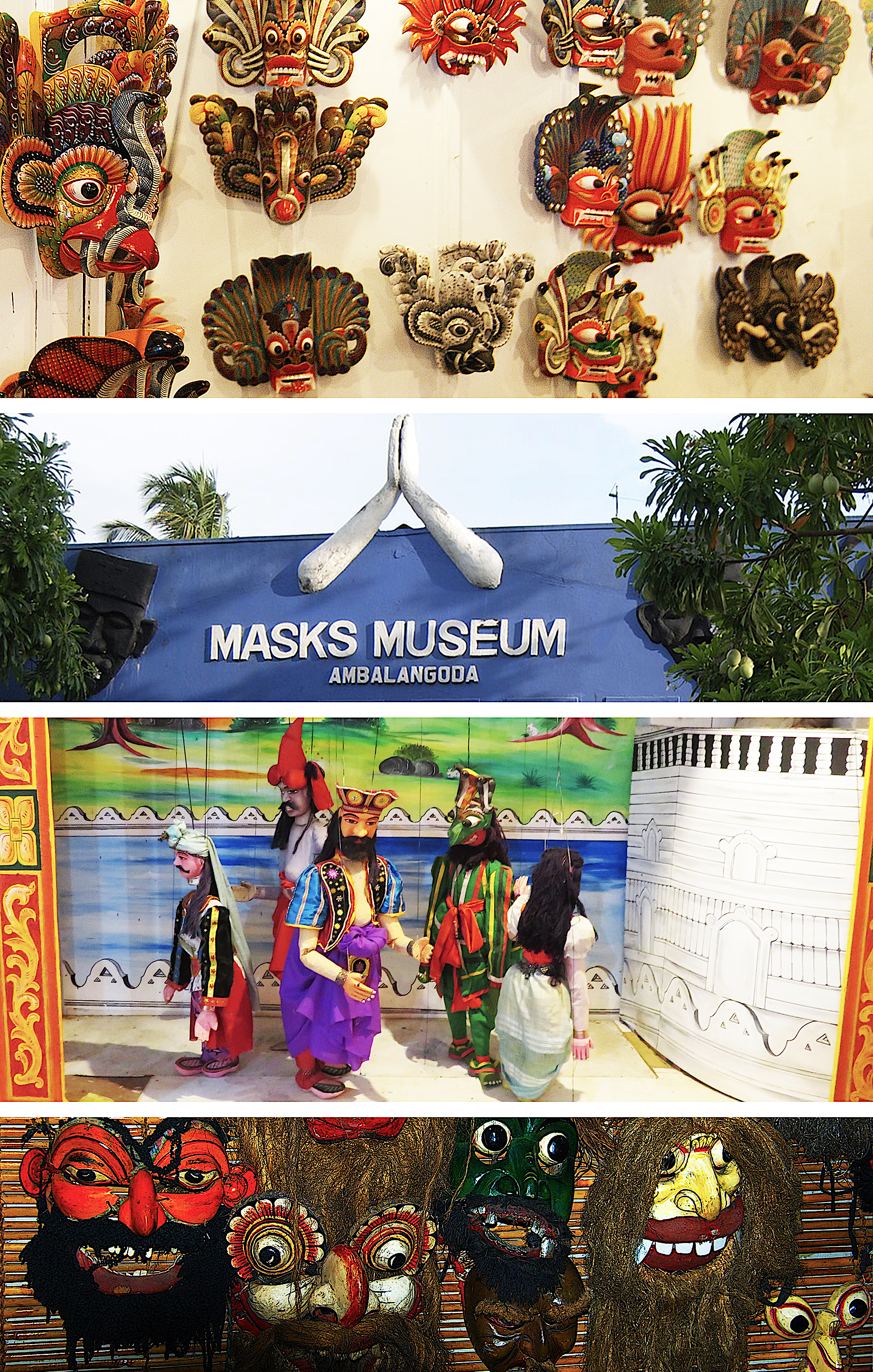
- Ambalangoda places

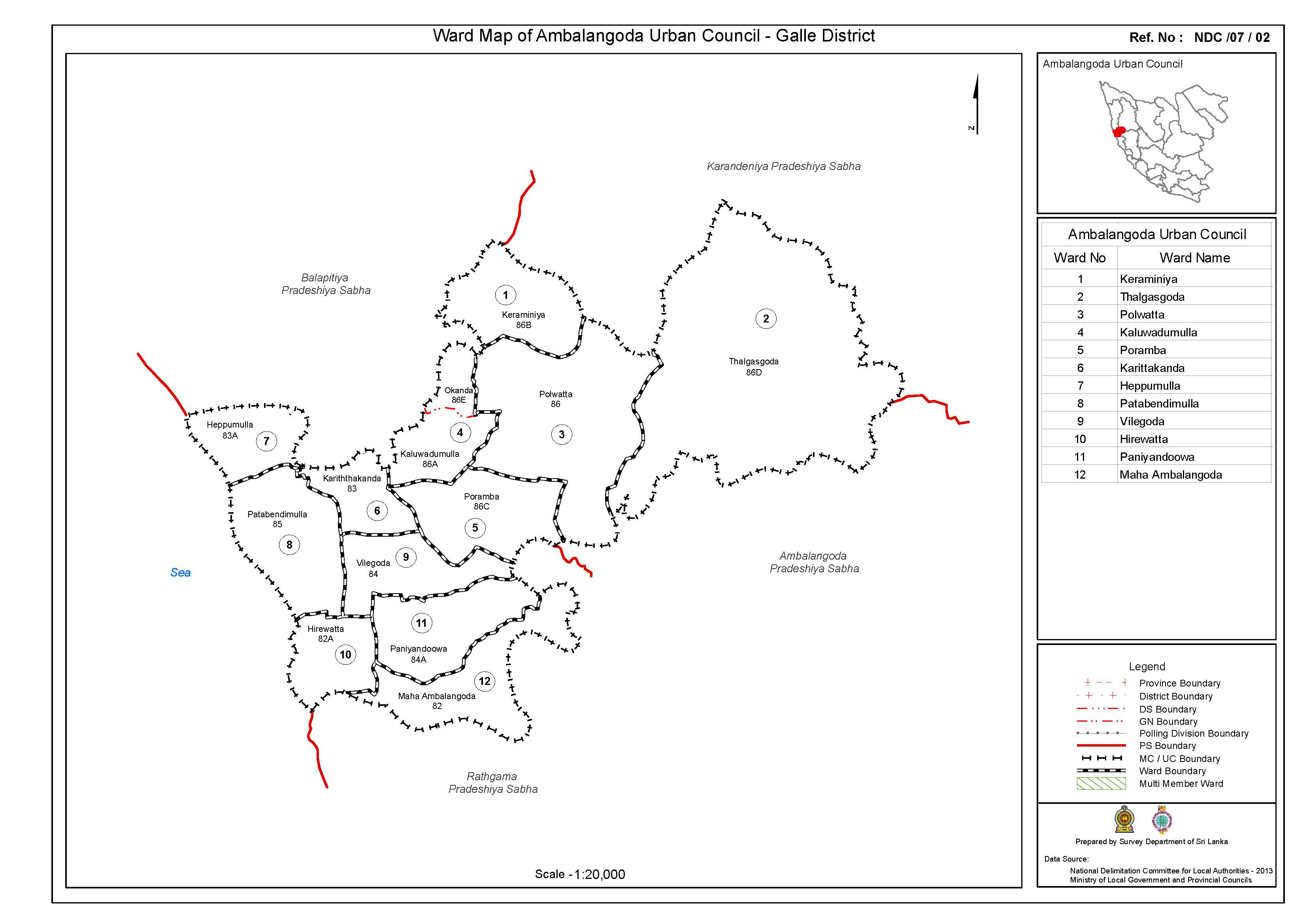
- Administrative Map of the Ambalangoda Urban Council.

- Location in Sri Lanka
- Country: Sri Lanka
- Province: Southern Province
- District: Galle District
- Elevation: 13 m (43 ft)

Population (2012)
  - Total: 56,783
  - Density: 1,092/km^{2} (2,830/sq mi)
- Time zone: +5.30
- Postal code: 80300
- Area code: 091

Ambalangoda is a coastal town in Galle District, Southern Province of Sri Lanka. The town is famous for the hand crafting of traditional demon masks and its devil dancers.

Situated about 87 kilometres (54 mi) south of Colombo, and 33.4 km (20.8 mi) north of Galle. The town is distinct from the Ambalangoda Urban Council area. Their boundaries differ and the Urban Council governs a much larger area than the town itself.

== Geography ==
Ambalangoda is located on the coast of the Indian Ocean, approximately 87 kilometres (54 mi) south of Colombo, at an elevation of 13 metres (43 ft) above sea level.

== History ==
Owing to the abundance of cinnamon in its hinterlands, Ambalangoda was the site of a Dutch East India Company outpost in the 18th century.

Consisting of a resthouse (now demolished) and a court building on a small bluff overlooking the beach, it served as the residence for the local Dutch magistrate and dignitaries traveling to Galle and Colombo. British Military Governor Frederick North is reported to have spent a night at the rest house during his tour around Ceylon in 1803. Simon Casie Chitty, in his Ceylon Gazetteer in 1833, gives the following account.

Amblangodde, a considerable village, rest house, and post station, about 15 miles south of Bentotte, and 19 north of Galle. It has a great number of houses covered with tiles, and is larger than most of the villages in this part of the country, and was once the station of a magistrate.

The inhabitants are exclusively fishermen, and a great portion of them are engaged in a coasting trade between the island and the coast of Coromandel. Here there is a remarkably splendid Wihare, as well as a school belonging to the Wesleyan missionaries.

— The Ceylon Gazetter 1833

In his travel guide: Book of Ceylon in 1907, Henry William Cave describes Ambalangoda as "a pleasant seaside place where good accommodation and excellent food can be obtained, and where the rare luxury of bathing in the open sea can be enjoyed in perfect security".

The rest house, said to have been a comfortable hostelry consisting of eight bedrooms, was razed by an act of a local politician in 2009. The courthouse survives to date.

Cave also noted in his 1910 book, The Ceylon Government Railway, that Ambalangoda and the surrounding hamlets had a population of 25,000.

== Masks and puppetry ==
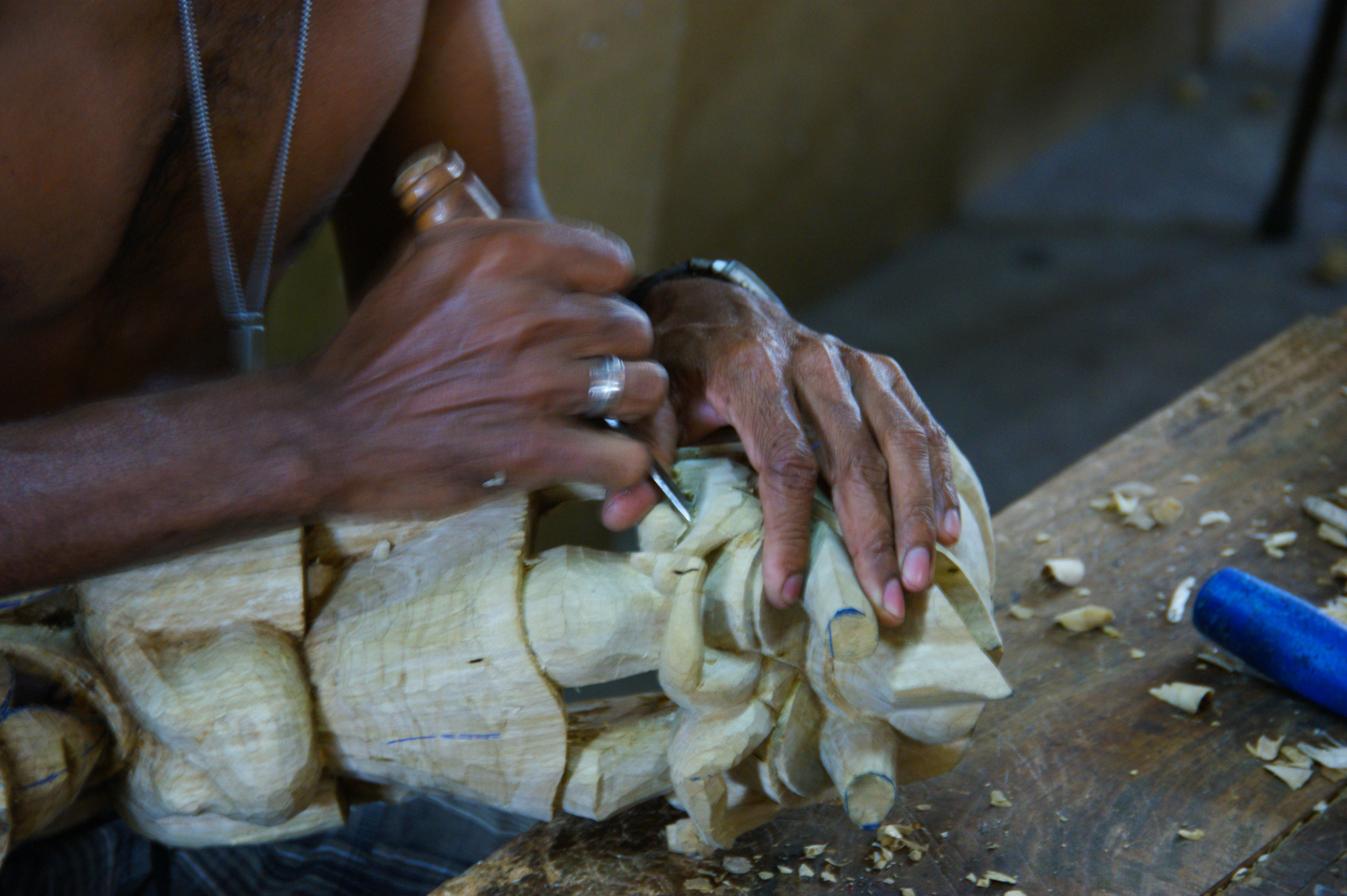
Ambalangoda mask manufacturing

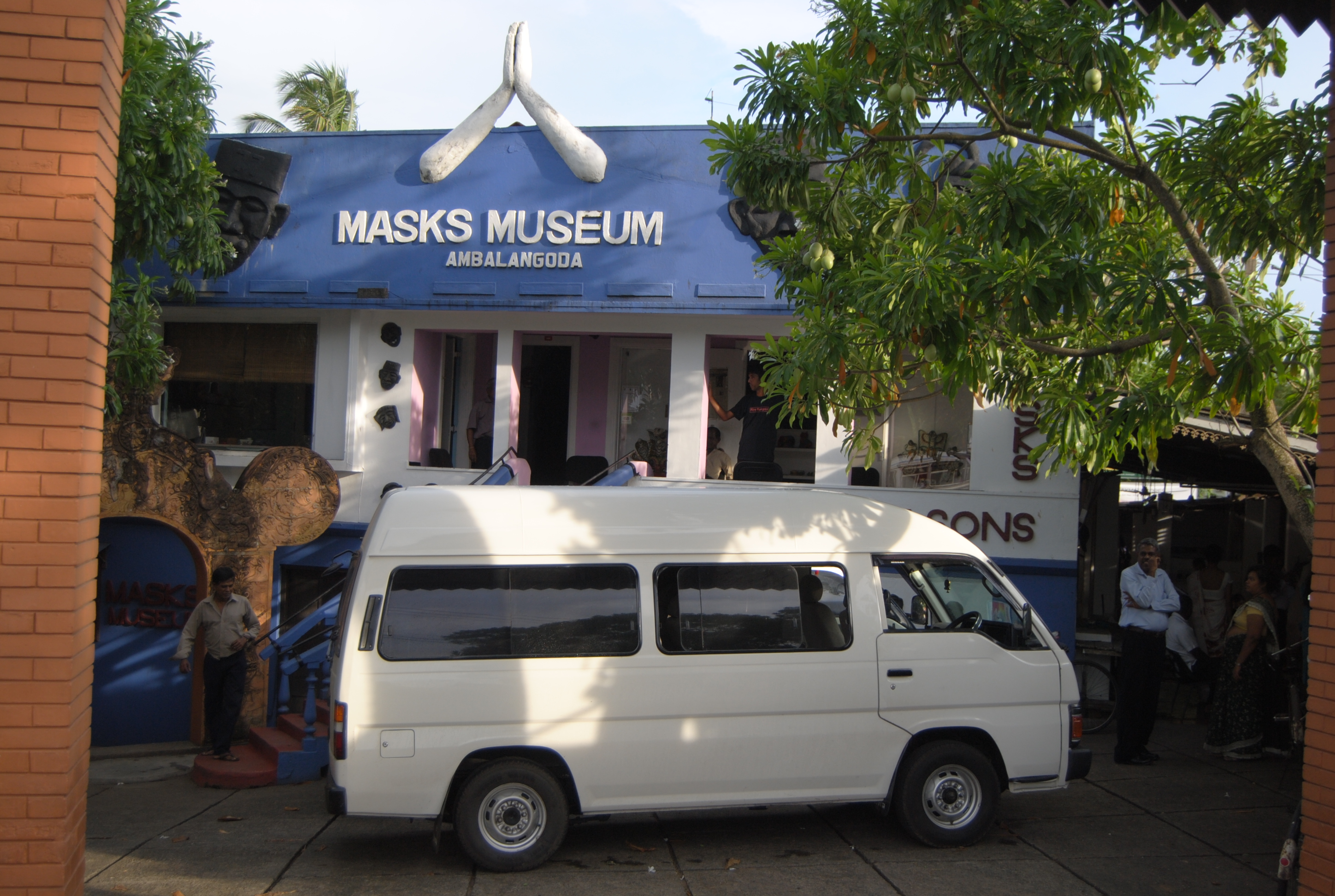
Ambalangoda Mask Museum

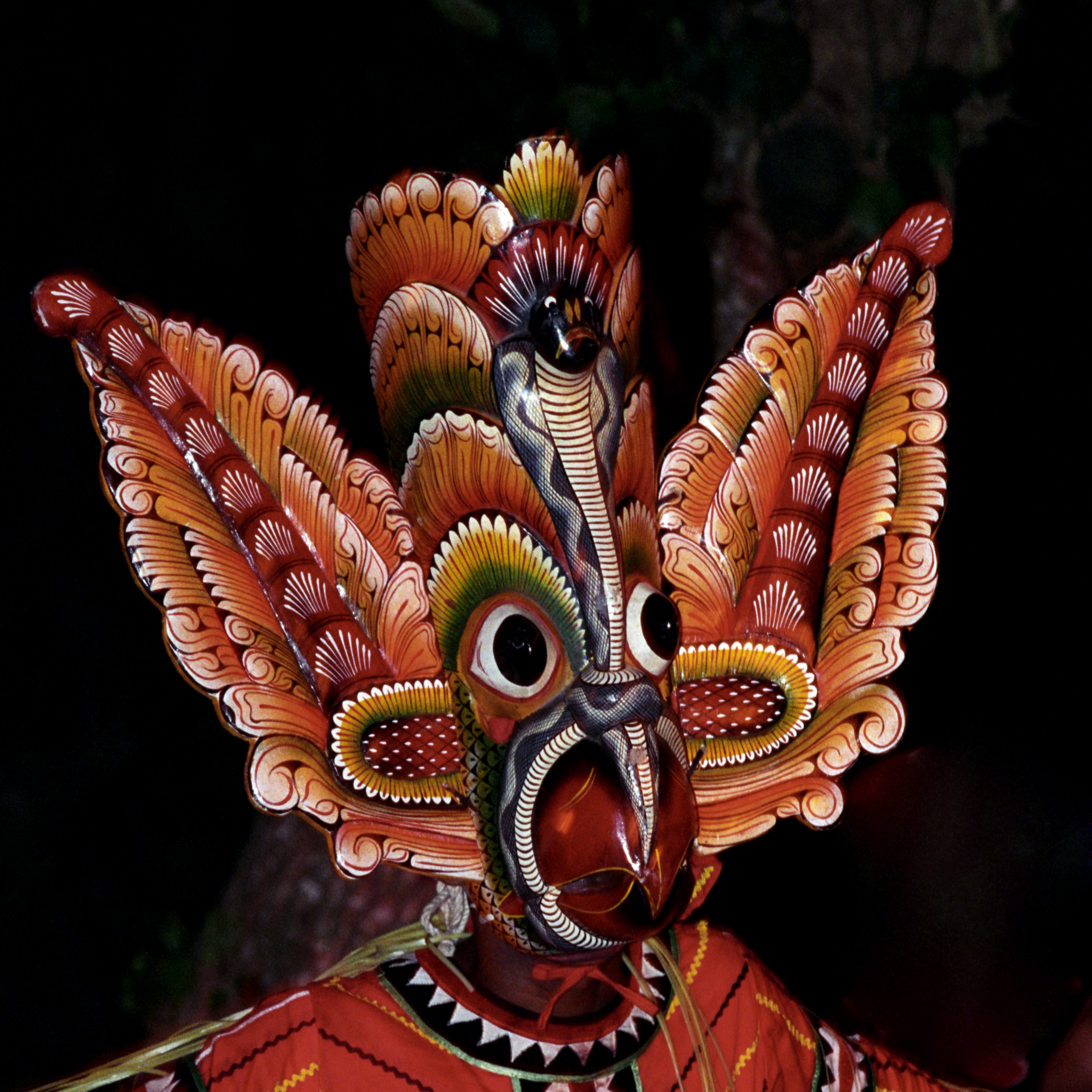
"Gurulu Raksha"(Devil Bird) Mask

The town is famous for the manufacture of traditional wooden masks and puppets. The traditional masks are carved from light Balsa wood (like Kaduru wood: Nux vomica). Kaduru trees grow in the marshy lands bordering paddy fields. The wood is smoke dried for a week in preparation. The hand carved and hand painted masks in traditional dance dramas are both vibrant and colorful.

Masks are created for three different types of dancing rituals: 'Kolam', which tell mocking stories of traditional Sri Lankan colonial life; 'Sanni', or devil dancing masks, used in a type of exorcism ceremony to heal people of persisting illnesses believed to be inflicted by demons; and 'Raksha' masks, which are used in festivals and processions. Local puppet shows, showing dramas, comedies and folk tales were also a popular form of entertainment. Influences from South India, Asia and Europe are assumed to have been the shaping factor in the art of mask dancing and puppetry. The Naga Raksha (Cobra demon) mask of the 'Raksha Kolama' (demon dance), consists of a ferocious face with bulging, popping & staring eyes, a carnivorous tongue lolling out of a wide mouth armed to the hilt with set of fanged teeth, all topped by a set of cobra hoods.

With the practices of traditional exorcism (thovil), mask dancing (kolam) and puppetry (rookada) shows in the decline, the art of mask carving has seen a reduction of interest. Though only a few of the antique originals survive, the local mask museum retains an interesting collection of reproductions and provides displays of carving techniques for visitors.

== Attractions ==
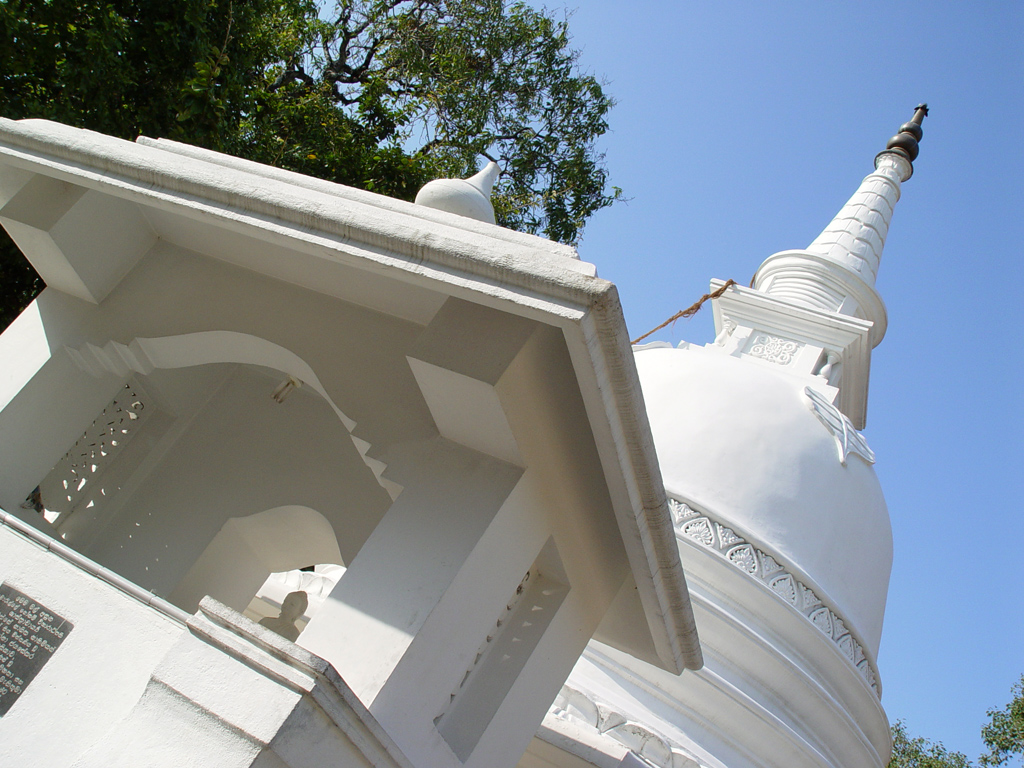
Siri Vijayarama Viharaya (Hirewaththa) temple

- Siri Vijayarama Viharaya (Hirewaththa) – Buddhist temple.
- Dutch Courthouse (අම්බලන්ගොඩ ඕලන්ද අශ්ව ඉස්තාලය), built in 1750. Originally, the building was used as a church, but later it served as a courthouse and as a stable.
- Galgoda Sailatalaramaya Maha Vihara Temple – South Asia's longest statue of a reclining Buddha (35 metres (115 ft))
- Sunandarama Vihara (අම්බලන්ගොඩ සුනන්දාරාම මහා විහාරය)- one of the oldest Buddhist temples on the southern coast, with the largest Thorana (gateway arch) in Sri Lanka
- Madu River Wetlands – the 915 ha (2,260 acres) Madu Ganga Estuary is connected by two narrow channels to the Randombe Lake, forming a complex wetland system encompassing 64 mangrove islets. It is a Ramsar classified wetland.
- Rock pool – A natural beach pool formed out of two angled rocks on the beach behind the (former) rest house (Old). Mentioned in several historical accounts as a safe spot for bathers.

== Transport ==
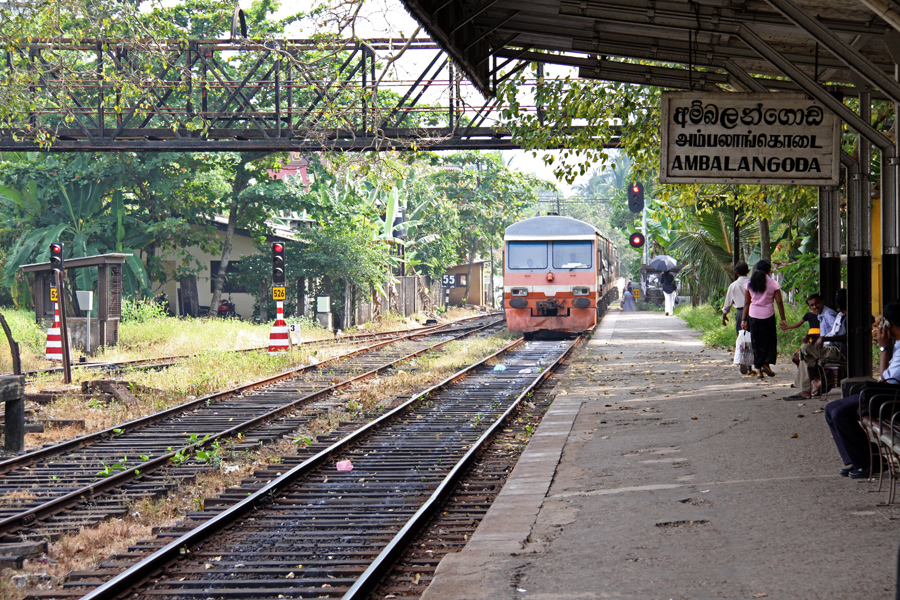
Railway station in Ambalangoda

Ambalangoda is served by Sri Lanka Railways' Coastal Line. Ambalangoda railway station, built in 1894, is a major station on the line, and is connected to the major cities Colombo and Galle by rail.

It is served by the A2 highway, which runs through the town. Kurundugahahetekma entrance of the E01 expressway is 13 kilometres (8.1 mi) from Ambalangoda. Ambalangoda has a main bus station near the railway station.

== Schools ==
Some of the schools situated in Ambalangoda are listed below:

- Dharmasoka College,
- P. De S. Kularathna Maha Vidyalaya,
- Prajapathi Gothami Balika Vidyalaya,
- Sri Devananda College

== Religion ==
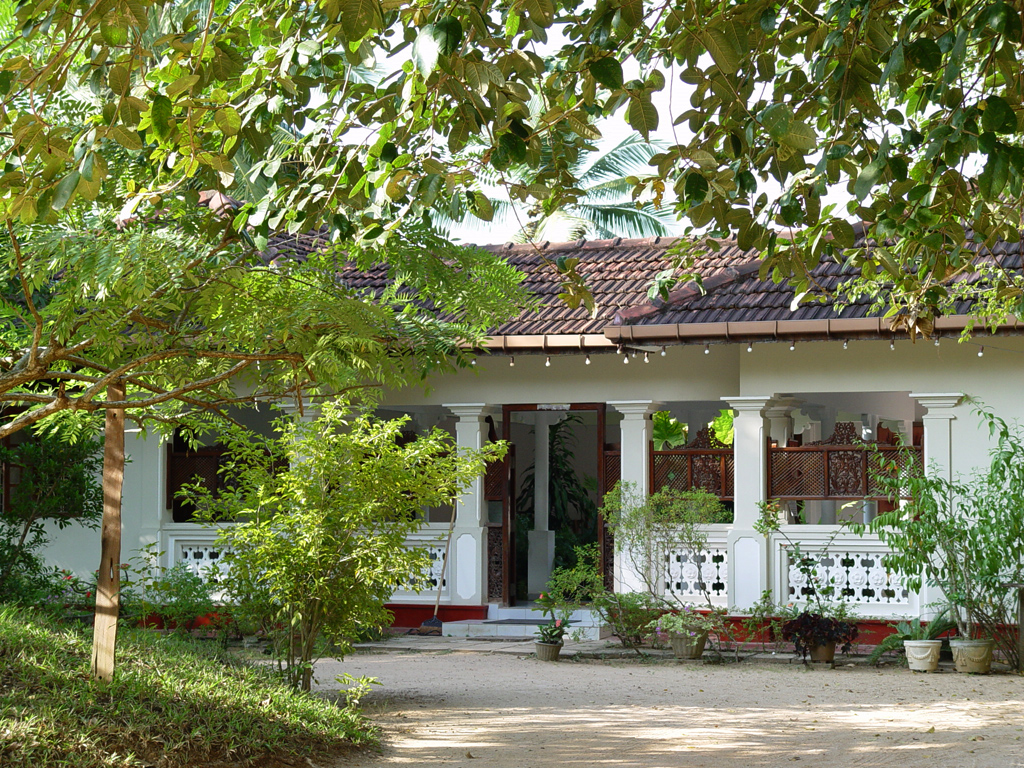
Sri Vijaya Ramaya Buddhist temple

The majority of the town's population is Buddhist (99,3 % in 2012 census: 56,563 out of 56,961 inhabitants).

== Cuisine ==
Ambalangoda has maintained a strong attachment towards seafood from its long-standing affiliation with the fishing industry. The local specialties, most of which consist of spiced dishes of fish, include.

- Biling Achcharu – a spicy condiment made from dried biling, Maldives fish and chilies.
- Fish ambul thiyal – a fish dish, mainly tuna, cooked dry in a thick seasoning of pepper, lime, salt and spices.
- Fish jaadi – fish preserved in a marination of lime, vinegar and salt.
