= Election Commission of Sri Lanka =

Sri Lanka national electoral body

- ශ්‍රී ලංකා මැතිවරණ කොමිෂන් සභාව இலங்கை தேர்தல்கள் ஆணைக்குழு

Non-ministerial/Semi-independent Agency overview
- Formed: October 1, 1955; 70 years ago As the Department of Elections
- Preceding agencies: Department of Elections (1955–2015); Department of Parliamentary Elections (1946–1955) (Merged into Department of Elections); Department of Local Authorities Elections (1946–1955) (Merged into Department of Elections)
- Jurisdiction: Sri Lanka
- Headquarters: Election Secretariat, Sarana Mawatha, Rajagiriya 10107, Sri Lanka; 6.91011°N 79.89269°E
- Employees: 674
- Annual budget: LKR 4.6 billion (2017)
- Non-ministerial/Semi-independent Agency executive: R. M. A. L. Rathnayake, (Chairman)
- Key document: 17th, 18th,19th and 20th Amendments to the Constitution of Sri Lanka
- Website: elections.gov.lk

The Election Commission of Sri Lanka is the constitutional authority responsible for administering and overseeing all elections in Sri Lanka, including the Presidential, Parliamentary, Provincial and Local Authority elections. Sri Lanka has had universal adult suffrage since 1934, becoming the first Crown colony to enfranchise all adult citizens, 3 years after the United Kingdom itself; the country is the oldest democracy in Asia.

== Early history ==
The recommendations of the Soulbury Commission of 1944 led to the country's 1948 'Soulbury Constitution', granting it independence with Dominion status within the British Empire through the Ceylon Independence Act of 1947. The work of the Commission began in 1944, with several pieces of key legislation being enacted in the interim as a result of its work- of these, the Ceylon (Constitution) Order in Council of 1946 would lead to the 1948 constitution, while the Ceylon (Parliamentary Elections) Order in Council and the Local Authorities Ordinance enacted in the same year created two government departments that would eventually go on to form the Elections Commission.

Section 88A of the Ceylon (Parliamentary Elections) Order in Council of 1946 established the Department of Parliamentary elections headed by a Commissioner and assisted by Assistant and Deputy Commissioners, with the responsibility of registering electors and the conduct of Parliamentary Elections. At the same time, the Local Authorities Ordinance, No. 53 of 1946 established the Department of Local Authorities Elections under a separate Commissioner and staff to oversee and administer all non-Parliamentary elections on the island. During its existence, the former oversaw two Parliamentary elections, in 1947 and 1952. These two departments functioned independently of each other until 1 October 1955, when they were merged to form the Department of Elections; as was the case with its predecessors, the department functioned as an independent, non-ministerial institution answerable only to Parliament and the Judiciary.

== Current members ==
Name	Appointed by	Date appointed	Description	Ref.
R. M. A. L. Rathnayake	Wickremesinghe	5 July 2023	Chairman	
M. A. P. C. Perera	Wickremesinghe	5 July 2023	Member	
A. M. Faaiz	Wickremesinghe	5 July 2023	Member	
Anusuya Shanmuganathan	Wickremesinghe	27 September 2023	Member	
D. M. S. S. Lakshman Dissanayake	Wickremesinghe	10 January 2024	Member	

== Commissioners ==
Commissioner	Term
Commissioner of the Department of Parliamentary Elections
A. Arulpiragasam	1 June 1955 – 1 October 1955
Commissioner of the Department of Elections
A. Arulpiragasam	1 October 1955 – 6 March 1957
Felix Dias Abeysinghe	7 March 1957 – 15 May 1978
M.A. Piyasekara	16 May 1978 – 31 January 1982
L.A.G. Jayasekara (Acting Commissioner)	17 February 1982 – 24 March 1982
S.L. Marikkar (Acting Commissioner)	25 March 1982 – 3 May 1982
Chandrananda de Silva	4 May 1982 – 17 February 1995
Dayananda Dissanayake (Note: Dissanayake was on medical leave during the Presidential election in 1999, during which period M.C. Arunthawachelwam, the Deputy Commissioner of Elections, was appointed Acting Commissioner. When Arunthawachelwam's health too deteriorated during the same election, D.M.C.B. Dassanayake, the Chief Secretary of the Sabaragamuwa Provincial Council, was appointed Acting Commissioner until Dayananda's return)	18 February 1995 – 25 March 2011
Mahinda Deshapriya	26 March 2011 – 13 November 2015
Chairman of the Election Commission
Mahinda Deshapriya	13 November 2015 – 13 November 2020
Nimal G. Punchihewa	2020–2023
R. M. A. L. Rathnayake	2023–Present

== See also ==
- Electoral districts of Sri Lanka
- List of political parties in Sri Lanka
