= List of protective service agencies =

== Albania ==
- Republican Guard (Albania)

== Australia ==
- Australian Federal Police

== Austria ==
- Bundeskriminalamt
- Bundespolizei
- EKO Cobra

== Bangladesh ==
- Special Security Force
- President Guard Regiment
- Special Security and Protection Battalion
  - Armed Police Battalion
- Special Branch
- Bangladesh Ansar

== Belarus ==
- Belarusian Presidential Security Service

== Brazil ==
- Institutional Security Bureau

== Bulgaria ==
- National Protection Service

== Canada ==
- Royal Canadian Mounted Police
- Parliamentary Protective Service
- Alberta Sheriffs Branch
- High Sheriff of Newfoundland and Labrador
- Canadian Forces Military Police
- Ministry of Public Security (Quebec)

== Chile ==
- Palace Guard and Presidential Escort of Carabineros de Chile

== China ==
- Central Security Bureau of the Chinese Communist Party (中共中央办公厅警卫局)
- Ministry of Public Security Guard Corps (Defunct)
- Ministry of Public Security Guards Bureau

=== Hong Kong ===
- VIP Protection Unit (Hong Kong) (要員保護組)

== Cyprus ==
- Presidential Guard Unit

== Czech Republic ==
- Útvar pro ochranu prezidenta České republiky
- Ochranná služba Policie České republiky

== Denmark ==
- Royal Life Guards
- Politiets Efterretningstjeneste

== Finland ==
- Dignitary Protection Service, Helsinki Police Department

== France ==
- Groupe de sécurité de la présidence de la République
- Service de Protection des Hautes Personnalités
- French Republican Guard

== Georgia ==
- Special State Protection Service

== Germany ==
- Bundespolizei
  - GSG 9
- Landespolizei
- Bundeskriminalamt
  - Sicherungsgruppe (SG)
    - Missions Abroad and Special Operations Unit

== Greece ==
- Evzones Presidential Guard
- Hellenic Police

== Hungary ==
- Counter Terrorism Centre (TEK – Terrorelhárítási Központ)
- Készenléti Rendőrség (Operational Police)

== India ==
- Special Protection Group
- President's Bodyguard

== Indonesia ==
- Presidential Security Force (Paspampres)
- Parliamentary Leadership Security Forces (TNI/POLRI)
- Directorate of Vital Object Security (Ditpamobvit)
- Samapta Bhayangkara Corps (Korsabhara)
- Mobile Brigade Corps (Brimob)
- Directorate of VIP and Important Facility Protection (Pamobvit)
- Military Police (TNI)
- Provost (Polri)
- Personnal Staff of Police Leadership (Spripim)
- Vital Object Protection Unit (Sat-Pamobvit)
- VIP Protection Unit of the People’s Consultative Assembly Of Indonesia (PAM VIP MPR RI)
- VIP Protection Unit of the House of Representatives Of Indonesia (PAM VIP DPR RI)
- VIP Protection Unit of the Regional Representatives Council Of Indonesia (PAM VIP DPD RI)
- Special Escort Detachment (Denwalsus)
- Special Security for the House of Representatives of the Republic of Indonesia (PAMSUS DPR RI)
- Security of the House of Representatives of the Republic of Indonesia (PAM DPR RI)
- Security of the Regional Representatives Council of the Republic of Indonesia (PAM DPD RI)
- Internal Security of the Regional Representatives Council of the Republic of Indonesia (PAMDAL DPD RI)
- Special Security for the Regional Representatives Council of the Republic of Indonesia (PAMSUS DPR RI)
- Special Security of the People's Consultative Assembly of the Republic of Indonesia (PAMSUS MPR RI)
- Security of the People's Consultative Assembly of the Republic of Indonesia (PAM MPR RI)
- Internal Security of the People's Consultative Assembly of the Republic of Indonesia (PAMDAL MPR RI)
- Internal Security of the House Of Representatives of the Republic of Indonesia (PAMDAL DPR RI)
- Special Escort Detachment (Ministry Of Defense)
- Special Guard For Attorney General
- Municipal Police VIP Protection Unit (Satpol PP Pam VIP)

== Ireland ==
- Garda Síochána Crime & Security Branch (CSB)
  - Special Detective Unit (SDU)
  - Emergency Response Unit (ERU)
- Defence Forces Army Ranger Wing (ARW)

== Israel ==
- Knesset Guard
- Shin Bet

== Italy ==
- Corazzieri

== Japan ==
- Imperial Guard of Japan
- Security Police, Tokyo Metropolitan Police Department

== Malaysia ==
- Special Actions Unit

== Monaco ==
- Compagnie des Carabiniers du Prince

== Nigeria ==
- State Security Service

== Norway ==
- Hans Majestet Kongens Garde (HMKG) (His Majesty The King's Guard)
- Den Kongelige Politieskorte (The Royal Police Escort)
- Politiets Sikkerhetstjeneste (PST)

== Netherlands ==
- Grenadiers' and Rifles Guard Regiment
- Garderegiment Fuseliers Prinses Irene
- National Expertise and Operations Unit, National Police Corps

== New Zealand ==
- Diplomatic Protection Squad

== North Korea ==
- Supreme Guard Command (Korean: 호위사령부; Hanja: 護衛司令部)
- Ministry of State Security (Partially)

== Philippines ==
- Armed Forces of the Philippines
  - Presidential Security Command
  - Philippine Marine Corps
    - Marine Security and Escort Group
- Philippine National Police
  - Police Security and Protection Group
- Congress of the Philippines
  - Senate of the Philippines
    - Office of the Sargeant-at-Arms
    - Security Enforcement Service
  - House of the Representatives
    - Office of the Sargeant-at-Arms
- Supreme Court of the Philippines
  - Office of the Judiciary Marshals

== Poland ==
- Służba Ochrony Państwa
- Żandarmeria Wojskowa

== Portugal ==
- Public Security Police

== Romania ==
- Serviciul de Protecţie şi Pază

== Russia ==
- Federal Protective Service
- Ministry of Internal Affairs (Russia)
- GRU
- Federal Security Service (Russia)

== Serbia ==
- Police
  - Unit for the Protection of the Important Persons and Residences
- Military
  - MP Special Operations Detachment "Cobras"

== Singapore ==
- Police Security Command

== Slovakia ==
- Úrad pre ochranu ústavných činiteľov a diplomatických misií

== Slovenia ==
- Slovenian Police
  - Security and Protection Office

== Sri Lanka ==
- Sri Lanka Army
  - President's Guard
  - Commando Regiment
- Sri Lanka Police Service
  - President's Security Division
  - Prime Minister's Security Division
  - Special Task Force

== South Korea ==
- Presidential Security Service (Korean: 대통령경호처; Hanja: 大統領警護處)
  - Defense Communication Command (Korean: 국군지휘통신사령부; Hanja: 國軍指揮通信司令部)
    - 90th Communication Group
  - Defense Counterintelligence Command
    - 828th Guards Brigade
  - Ministry of National Defense Service Support Group (Korean: 국방부 근무지원단; Hanja: 國防部 勤務支援團)
    - Military Police Battalion
  - Capital Defense Command (Korean: 수도방위사령부; Hanja: 首都防衛司令部)
    - 33rd Military Police Guards Brigade
    - 55th Security Group
  - Republic of Korea Navy
    - "Cheonghae" Brigade
  - Republic of Korea Air Force
    - 35th Flight Group
  - National Police Agency (South Korea)
    - 101st Security Group
    - 202nd Security Group
    - 22nd Police Guards Brigade
  - National Fire Agency (South Korea)
    - Presidential Security Fire Brigade

== Spain ==
- Spanish Royal Guard
- Department of Security of the Presidency of the Government

== Sweden ==
- Life Guards
- SÄPO (Säkerhetspolisen)

== Taiwan ==
- Special Service Command Center, National Security Bureau (特種勤務指揮中心)

== Thailand ==
- Armed Forces Security Center (AFSC) – Personal protective security for the royal family, members of the Royal Thai Government VIPs, and Thai Military VIPs.
- King's Guard – Ceremonial distinction given to various units in the Royal Thai Armed Forces and protective security to members royal family.
- National Intelligence Agency (NIA) – Maintaining civil security for civil government agencies and provides members of the Royal Thai Government protective security.
- Royal Security Command (RSC) – Militarized royal guards under the Monarchy of Thailand and provides personal protective security to the royal family.
- Special Branch Bureau (SBB) – Personal protective security to members royal family, members of the Royal Thai Government VIPs, and members of foreign governments VIPs visiting Thailand.

== Turkey ==
- General Directorate of Security
  - Police Counter Attack Team
- Presidential Guard Regiment

== Ukraine ==
- State Security Administration (Ukraine)

== United Kingdom ==
- Royal Household
  - His Majesty's Body Guard of the Honourable Corps of Gentlemen at Arms
  - The King's Body Guard of the Yeomen of the Guard
  - The Royal Company of Archers, The King's Bodyguard for Scotland
- Home Office
  - Metropolitan Police
    - Protection Command
      - Royalty and Specialist Protection
      - Parliamentary and Diplomatic Protection
  - Civil Nuclear Constabulary
- Ministry of Defence
  - Ministry of Defence Police
  - Royal Military Police
    - Specialist Operations Regiment
      - Close Protection Unit
  - Household Division
    - The Life Guards
    - The Blues and Royals (Royal Horse Guards and 1st Dragoons)
    - Grenadier Guards
    - Coldstream Guards
    - Scots Guards
    - Irish Guards
    - Welsh Guards

== United States ==
- Department of Homeland Security
  - Secret Service
  - Federal Air Marshal Service
  - Federal Protective Service
  - Coast Guard Investigative Service
- Department of State
  - Diplomatic Security Service (DSS)
- Department of Justice
  - Marshals Service
  - FBI Police
- Department of Defense
  - Air Force Office of Special Investigations
  - Army Criminal Investigation Command
  - Defense Criminal Investigative Service
  - Naval Criminal Investigative Service
  - Pentagon Force Protection Agency
- Department of the Treasury
  - Mint Police
- Department of Veterans Affairs
  - Veterans Affairs Police
- Department of the Interior
  - Park Police
  - National Zoological Park Police
- United States Postal Service
  - Postal Inspection Service
- Congress of the United States
  - Capitol Police
- other
  - District of Columbia Protective Services Division
  - Amtrak Police
  - Supreme Court Police

== Vatican ==
- Swiss Guard
- Gendarmerie Corps of Vatican City State

== Vietnam ==
- Ministry of Public Security (Bộ Công an) - High Command of Protective Guard of Vietnam (Bộ Tư lệnh Cảnh vệ Việt Nam)

== Historical ==
=== Roman Empire ===
- Praetorian Guard
- Jovians and Herculians

=== Byzantine Empire ===
- Varangian Guard

=== Tsarist Bulgaria ===
- Life Guards

=== Ottoman Empire ===
- Janissaries

=== Ethiopian Empire ===
- "Kebur Zabagna" Imperial Guards

=== Egypt ===
- Ghilman

=== First French Empire ===
- Imperial Guard (Napoleon I)

=== Second French Empire ===
- Imperial Guard (Napoleon III)

=== Nazi Germany ===
- Schutzstaffel (SS)

=== Hungary ===
- Köztársasági Őrezred Until 1 July 2012
- BM Kormányőrség from 1957 to 1990
- Magyar Királyi Testõrség from 1920 to 1945

=== Austria-Hungary ===
- Magyar Királyi Darabont Testőrség from 1904 to 1918
- cs. kir. csendőr-testőrség (Leibgarde-Gendarmerie) 1850–1918
- Magyar Királyi Nemes Testőrség from 1760 to 1850

=== Iraq ===
- Iraqi Special Security Organization

=== Edo Japan ===
- Shinsengumi

=== Imperial Japan ===
- "Konoe Shidan" Imperial Guards (近衛師団)

=== Achaemenid Empire ===
- Persian Immortals

=== Iran under the Pahlavi dynasty ===
- Iranian Imperial Guard

=== Polish–Lithuanian Commonwealth ===
- Gwardia Piesza Koronna

=== Kingdom of Laos ===
- Royal Lao Army, Laotian Royal Guard
- Royal Lao Police, Laotian Gendarmerie
- Royal Lao Police; Directorate of National Coordination, 1st Special Mobile Group (Groupement Mobile Speciale 1 – GMS 1)

=== Second Polish Republic ===
- Kompania Zamkowa 1926–1939

=== Poland ===
- Biuro Ochrony Rządu 1956–2018

=== Tsarist Russia ===
- Russian Imperial Guard

=== Kingdom of Serbia/Yugoslavia ===
- Royal Serbian/Yugoslav Guards

=== Great Britain ===
- Royal Horse Guards

=== Kingdom of Romania ===
- 1st Royal Guard "Vânători" Battalion

=== Republic of Vietnam ===
- Presidential Guard
- Republic of Vietnam National Police VIP Protection Service

== See also ==
- Border guard
- Coast guard
- Home guard
- Imperial guard
- List of intelligence agencies
- List of law enforcement agencies
- List of secret police organizations
- National Guard
- Republican guard
- Royal guard
- State defense force
