= List of Sri Lankan mobsters =

List of Sri Lankan organised-crime figures

This is a list of some notable organized crime figures in Sri Lanka.

| Name | Life | Years active | Comments | References |
|---|---|---|---|---|
| Sunil Perera alias Gonawala Sunil | 1944–1987 | 1977–1987 | Gonawala Sunil was one of the most notorious criminal leaders in Sri Lanka. He was allegedly abused by old men connected with the UNP government at that time. He was involved in the massacre of 53 prisoners at Welikada Prison in 1983 and was convicted for raping a 17-year-old girl in 1981. He was serving his sentence in prison when he was famously released on a presidential pardon given by President J. R. Jayewardene on 7 July 1981, the day Sri Lanka was celebrating the country's 50th Anniversary of gaining universal franchise. Subsequently, he was made an all-island Justice of the Peace (JP). He was also the bodyguard of Ranil Wickremasinghe, the Minister of Education of the J.R. Jayawardene government at that time. Sunil was shot and killed at his home in Kelaniya by assassins on 25 June 1987. | |
| Arambawelage Don Upali Ranjith alias Soththi Upali | died 1998 | 1970–1998 | He was said to be a close ally of Sirisena Cooray, the Minister of Housing and Construction of Premadasa government. It is alleged that he was addressed as "sir" even by the officers of Sri Lanka Police. He served as a reserve sub inspector at one time and was included in the UNP executive body by President Premadasa. In 1997, a Presidential Commission appointed by President Chandrika Bandaranaike Kumaratunga concluded that Upali was directly involved in the assassination of Lalith Athulathmudali. Before the trial against him was finished, he was killed by a rival gang led by Kaduwela Raja on December 17, 1998. | |
| Bulathsinghalage Sirisena Cooray alias Sirisena Cooray | 1931–2021 | 1970s–1990s | He was the Mayor of Colombo from 1979 to 1989 and was elected from Colombo to Parliament in the 9th parliamentary election in 1989. He was an ally of Soththi Upali and other mobs. There are some conspiracy theories regarding Central Bank bombing as well as referring to the death of President Premadasa. There is a conspiracy theory that UNP's Sirisena Cooray cooperated with the Liberation Tigers of Tamil Eelam (LTTE) to plan the bombing, maybe with the plan to actually not hurt Premadasa. Sirisena Cooray appears in almost every conspiracy theory with regard to political assassinations from 1985 to 1994, as he is alleged to have been heavily involved with the Colombo underworld at that time. | |
| Ajith Dhammika alias Kalu Ajith | died 1997 | 1980s–1997 | Kalu Ajith was involved in the killing of Chinthaka Amarasinghe in 1996. He was killed by Donald Nihal Wickramasinghe alias Nawala Nihal on July 16, 1997, near Badaowita. | |
| Ronald Prince Collom alias Kunu Kumaraya | 1973–2007 | 1992–2007 | Collom was involved in various murders and rape cases in the Kotahena and Grandpass areas. His main Political supporter was Mervin Silva He is involved in more than 100 plus killings. He used the Bluemendhal garbage dump to hide his victims, weapons and bodies. To this day he's the most dangerous criminal in Sri Lanka to ever exist because of his torture and killing methods. He enjoyed in killing and torturing people. He used very Inhuman sadistic methods. He had serious psychopathic tendencies when it came to killing and torturing. He was a saint for his people but a petty criminal who had major mental issues. He was named Godfather of Garbage. He supported his relatives and close allies but killed many innocents. He was a Robin Hood to people in his area but for the rest of the country he's Red Hood who only knows blood's taste. No one was an excuse even kids, animals and woman got the same treatment. He was also involved in extortion rackets, taking ransoms and providing security to Mervyn Silva. Taking ransoms and extortions got him killed when he crossed many lines. His wife and older sister was remanded too for demanding ransoms. Collom was killed by a brave unit in 2007 inside his own home. | |
| Usliyanage Chinthaka Nalin Perera alias Chinthaka Amarasinghe | died 1996 | 1980s–1996 | Chinthaka Amarasinghe's father was killed by Soththi Upali, He was dragged into this fight because of the injustice that led to getting his father killed by the henchmen of Soththi Upali, Upali went after innocent kids after gaining political support of Ranasinghe Premadasa and misused the said power. He gunned down Malu Nihal and Cheena – who were major henchmen of Upali who killed his father, at Gothamipura in March 1993. He was killed at Thotalanga by a rival gang led by Kalu Ajit in 1996. | |
| Dhammika Amarasinghe | died 2004 | 1990s–2004 | Brother of a former underworld stalwart Chinthaka Amarasinghe was also dragged into this cause of multiple life-threatening incidents. Mainly operating in Kalutara and Colombo where he was involved in many underworld clashes. It was reported that 16 of Dhammikas Family members were killed by Soththi Upali's gang. Dhammika was killed on January 9, 2004, inside the court room no.6 of Colombo Magistrate by Siriwardanage Chaminda Udaya Kumara (Mol Chaminda). It was speculated that he was killed in order to conceal the conduct of several high-ranking politicians, during the hearing. | |
| A.H.L.D Wasantha Darmasiri Jayarathna alias Kaduwela Wasantha | 1965–2002 | 1980s–2002 | Kaduwela ally of Chinthaka and Kalu Ajith. Finally killed by a rival gang led by Karate Dhammika and Army Roshan on May 26, 2002. | |
| Iresh | died 2001 | 1994–2001 | Involved in several murders, kidnapping etc., he was killed in Nugegoda by a rival gang. His was considered one of the youngest members to enter the IRC book of thugs. | |
| Moratu Saman | died 2003 | 1990s–2003 | Key suspect of the assassination of the controversial politician Kumar Ponnambalam. Moratu Saman was initially a close ally of Dhammika Amarasinghe but eventually fell out with him. Amarasinghe attempted to kill him in 2002. He was killed by a rival gang led by Thoppi Chaminda in 2003. | |
| Koswattage Donald Nihal Wickremasinghe alias Nawala Nihal | died 2006 | 1976–2000s | Nihal was involved in several murders and extortion rackets over the years. He killed the prominent underworld figure, Kalu Ajit and two of his henchmen at Aththidiya. He is considered as the godfather of Colombo underworld during his heyday. He is also known to have distributed money among the poor. He was given protection by many corrupted police officers in Welikada and Nugegoda Divisions. Nawala Nihal was abducted and killed by a gang led by his mistress Renuka Wasanthi. | |
| Kitulgamaralalage Ajith Wasantha alias Vambotta | died 2006 | 2000–2006 | It was reported that 3 of Vambotta's sisters were allegedly raped, tortured and killed by a rival family. This had led to a series of revenge killings with more than 25 of the rival family members being killed and their property destroyed. He was wanted for 10 murders, extortion and kidnapping. He had allegedly started his life by selling vegetables at Sooriyawewa, hence the name Vambotta (Brinjal). He was killed by a rival gang named "Ratnaweera gang" in April 2006. He is known to have closely associated President Mahinda Rajapaksa. | |
| Jayakody Arachchige Ruwan Perera alias Olcott | 1977–2010 | 1988–2010 | Hailing from Magazine Road, Borella, he was linked to more than 28 killings, several robberies and abductions in Colombo and its suburbs. He earned a massive fortune through drug trade, especially heroin. He owned two luxury residences in Colombo and Kurunegala. Olcott was involved in the LTTE's failed assassination attempt of President Chandrika Bandaranaike Kumaratunga along with Thel Bala and Kimbulaela Guna, two other notorious gang leaders. After the incident, he left Sri Lanka and lived in Tamil Nadu for more than a decade. He returned to Sri Lanka in 2009. His mansion was stormed by Special Task Force (STF) soldiers in September 2010. He was arrested and subsequently killed, when he allegedly tried to grab the weapon of an officer. | |
| Kamal Dammalarachchi alias Dematagoda Kamal | 1971–2010 | 1990s–2010 | Dematagoda Kamal was involved in at least 15 murders including the killing of Dushyantha Senevirathne – the Leader of Opposition in the Galle Municipal Council. He was killed when he allegedly tried to throw a bomb at the Police. | |
| Sinniah Gunasekeran alias Kimbula-Ela Guna | died 2017 | 1990s–2008 | Kimbula-Ela Guna was a major drug dealer in Sri Lanka. He was involved in LTTE activities also. He took part in LTTE's failed attempt to kill President Chandika Kumaratunga in 1999. After that, he fled Sri Lanka and lived in Tamil Nadu. It is alleged that he monitored and conducted drug trafficking in Sri Lanka from there. In 2008, he was arrested by the Tamil Nadu Police. | |
| Ganeshalingam Saipriyan alias Thel Baala | died 2017 | 2014s–2017 | was a prominent drug dealer and gang leader around Jaffna in Sri Lanka during the late 2014s and early 2018s. He fled to jaffna following complications of an organ transplant. | |
| Ashoka Upanitha Perera alias Pamankada Asoka | died 2000 | 1980s–2000 | Former underworld leader who led organized crime in Sri Lanka. He was allegedly involved in the shooting and murder of six people in 1999 near Delkanda. He was killed by a rival gang led by Beddagana Sanjeewa on 28 June 2000. | |
| M.K. Imtiaz alias Anamalu Imtiaz | died 2009 | 1990s–2009 | Anamalu Imtiaz was involved in at least 39 murders, including contract killings. He was also heavily involved in other areas of crime, including extortion and drug dealing. He operated in Maligawatte, and was kidnapped and killed by an unknown rival gang on July 9, 2009. | |
| A.V Iran Dansuka Perera alias Beddagana Sanjeewa | 1972–2001 | 1990s–2001 | Beddagana Sanjeewa, a trusted colleague of Chandrika’s (Former President of Sri Lanka) security team, can be considered as a pet criminal brought up at Temple Trees, the official residence of the Prime Minister of Sri Lanka. He implemented programs that oppressed and persecuted individuals at the behest of President Kumaratunga or her close associates. | |
| Gampola Vidanelage Samantha Kumara alias Wele Suda | 1970s | 2000s–2015 | Wele Suda is the biggest international drug dealer that was brought into justice so far. He was arrested in Pakistan and brought to Sri Lanka on February 14, 2015, for allegedly obtaining an amount of Rs. 170 million by trafficking drugs. | |
| Samaarasingha Arachchige Madush Lakshitha alias Makandure Madush | 1979–2020 | 2002–2020 | Makandure Madush was an underworld leader and a drug kingpin, who led organized crime and drug trafficking in Sri Lanka. He was alleged on murder of Southern Development Authority Chairman Danny Hittetiyage in 2006. He escaped to Dubai and managed to operate his network from there, until he was arrested in Dubai on 04–02–2019. Madush was shot dead on Oct 20th 2020 during a shootout with the police and unknown gunmen at the Maligawatta housing complex. | |
| Mohommad Najim Mohommad Imran alias Kanjipani Imran | 1980s | 2010s | One of the notorious drug dealer and underworld kingpin operated in Colombo. He was arrested in Dubai along with Makandure Madush on 04–02–2019. On 25 August 2019, he was sentenced to six years of rigorous imprisonment by Colombo High Court for possessing and trafficking of 5.3 kg of cannabis. Again he was further arrested over another case involving death threatening to two police officers while he was overseas. | |
| Aruna Damith Udayanga alias Ranale Samayan | 1989–2017 | 2007–2017 | He was killed by a rival gang led by Angoda Lokka and Makandure Madush according to the police sources. | |
| Maddumage Chandana Lasantha Perera alias Angoda Lokka | died 2020 | 2000s–2020 | Angoda Lokka murdered another underworld figure called "Samayan" in 2017.The underworld gangster Maddumage Lasantha Chandana Perera alias Angoda Lokka died of a heart attack in Coimbatore, India while he was living in disguise planning and executing various criminal activities in Sri Lanka through his henchmen. | |
| Indunil Vajira Kumara alias Indra | died 2020 | 2010–2020 | Indra was identified as a shooter of an underworld gang led by Samayan. He was shot dead by police while attempting to strangle a police constable during he was taken to find hidden weapon stock in Ranala area. Several weapons were uncovered the police during the operation. | |
| Rajapaksa Arachchige Dinuka Madushan alias Keselwatte Dinuka | died 2021 | 2001–2010s | The notorious criminal Keselwatte Dinuka has died in Dubai and the dead body was flown to Sri Lanka from Dubai on 18 March 2021. He has been carrying out criminal activities from Dubai according to the police. | |
| Dharmakeerthi Tharaka Perera Wijesekera alias Kosgoda Tharaka | 1987–2021 | 2005–2021 | Kosgoda Tharaka was involved in multiple crimes in Matara, Moratuwa, and Kottawa police areas. He was alleged for several murders and thefts. The most notable incident was the assassination of a police officer while robbing a jewelry shop in Matara in 2018. The criminal was shot dead by police during a special operation in Meerigama where he tried to attack police. | |
| Dinantha Bandara alias Higuraka Bandara | 2010 | 2015–2018 | Higuraka Bandara is a person who was in custody mainly in connection with drug smuggling in Polonnaruwa Area. Providing support to major underworld gangs and leading kidnapping and extortion gangs. The most unique feature of this is that he is a young criminal, Underworld gangs have been used to execute master plans for several murders and meticulously plan crimes. Information has been received that he was the main culprit for the murder of four people in Habarana city in 2018 and escaped from prison while he was in prison and is currently hiding abroad. | |

Kehelbaddara padme Was arrested in Indonesia in August 2025
