= Armed Police (disambiguation) =

Certain gendarmerie and paramilitary police forces include the words "armed police" as part of their name.

Organisations whose names contain the word "armed police" include:

- Armed Police Corps, former Spanish urban police force
- Armed Police Force, Nepalese paramilitary police force
- Central Armed Police Forces, Indian paramilitary police forces
- People's Armed Police, Chinese paramilitary police force
