= Paramilitary police =

Paramilitary police may refer to:

- Auxiliaries, support personnel that assist the military or police but are organised differently from regular forces
- Constabulary, a form of police force used in various jurisdictions
- City guard, a local militia company formed to enforce municipal laws
- Gendarmerie, a military or paramilitary force with law enforcement duties among the civilian population
- Incident response team, a group of people who prepare for and respond to an emergency
- Police tactical unit, a specialised police unit trained and equipped to handle high‑risk situations that exceed the capabilities of ordinary law‑enforcement units
- Protective security unit, typically providing policing, security, intelligence and bodyguard services for sovereigns and politicians
- Security forces, statutory organizations with internal security mandates
