= President of Sri Lanka =

Head of state and government

- ශ්‍රී ලංකා ජනාධිපති இலங்கை ஜனாதிபதி
- Emblem of Sri Lanka

- Flag of Sri Lanka

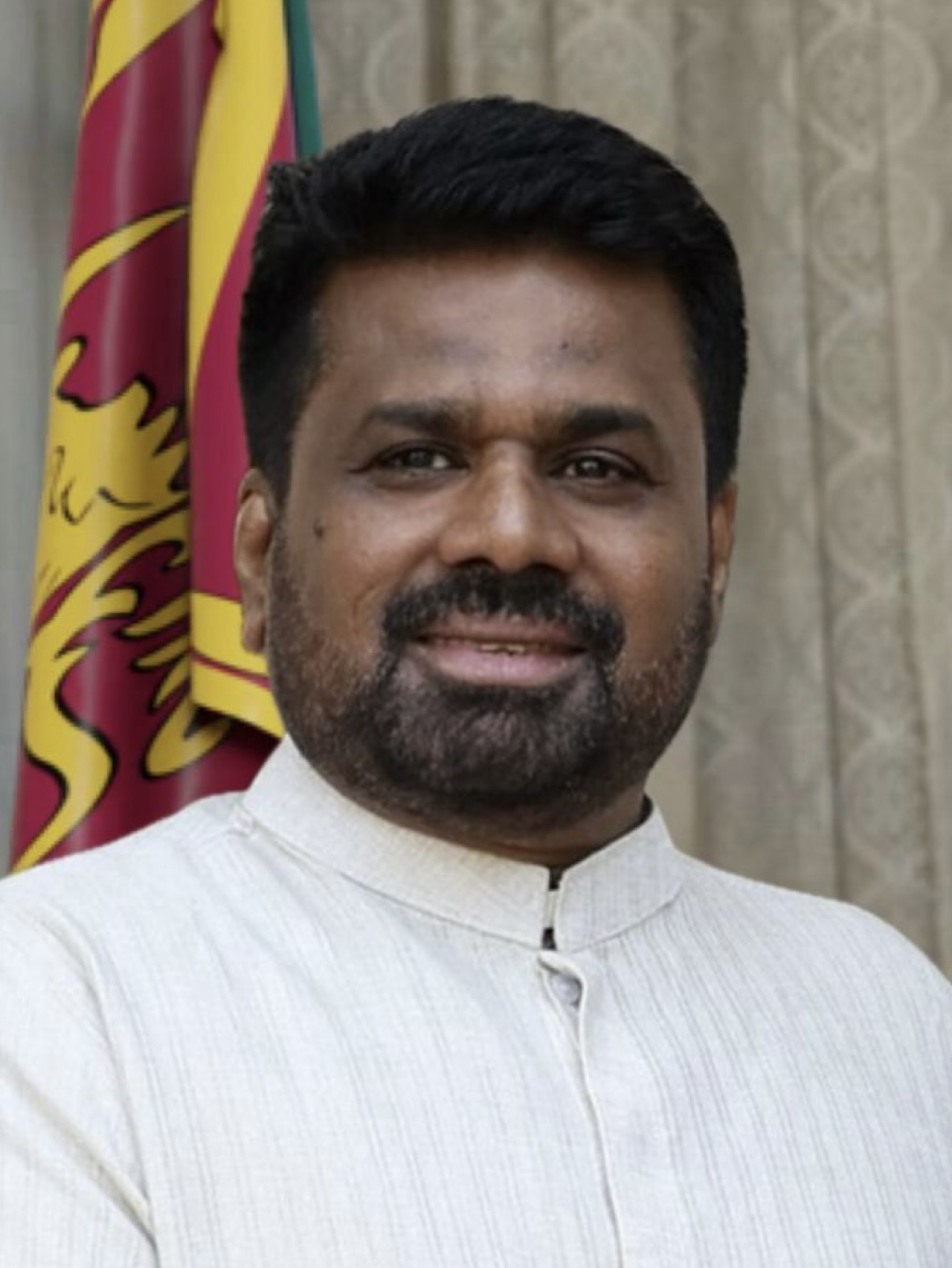
- Incumbent; Anura Kumara Dissanayake since 23 September 2024
- Style: Mr. President (Informal); His Excellency (Formal)
- Type: Head of state; Head of government; Commander-in-chief
- Member of: Cabinet; National Security Council
- Residence: President's House
- Nominator: Citizens of Sri Lanka
- Appointer: Direct election; See eligibility
- Term length: Five years, renewable once
- Constituting instrument: Constitution of Sri Lanka (1978)
- Precursor: Monarch of Ceylon
- Inaugural holder: William Gopallawa under the 1972 Constitution
- Formation: 22 May 1972; 54 years ago
- First holder: William Gopallawa
- Succession: Sri Lankan presidential line of succession
- Deputy: Prime Minister
- Website: president.gov.lk Presidential Secretariat

The president of Sri Lanka (Sinhala: ශ්‍රී ලංකා ජනාධිපති Śrī Laṅkā Janādhipati; Tamil: இலங்கை ஜனாதிபதி Ilaṇkai janātipati) is the head of state and head of government of the Democratic Socialist Republic of Sri Lanka. The president is the chief executive of the union government and the commander-in-chief of the Sri Lanka Armed Forces. The powers, functions and duties of prior presidential offices, in addition to their relation with the prime minister and Government of Sri Lanka, have over time differed with the various constitutional documents since the creation of the office. The president appoints the prime minister who can command the confidence of the Parliament of Sri Lanka.

Anura Kumara Dissanayake is the 10th and current president, having assumed office on 23 September 2024, after being declared the winner of the 2024 presidential election.

== History ==
Under the Soulbury Constitution which consisted of the Ceylon Independence Act of 1947 and The Ceylon (Constitution and Independence) Orders in Council 1947, Ceylon (as Sri Lanka was known then) became a constitutional monarchy with a Westminster parliamentary form of government. The monarch of Ceylon served as the head of state, represented by the governor-general with the prime minister serving as the head of government. The governor-general replaced the position of the governor of British Ceylon, who had previously exercised executive control over the entire island since 1815.

In 1972, the new Republican Constitution declared Sri Lanka a parliamentary republic with a president as head of state. The president was a largely ceremonial figure; real power remained vested in the prime minister.

In 1978, the second amendment to the Constitution replaced the Westminster system with a more semi-presidential system. The presidency became an executive post based closely on the French model, and was now both head of state and head of government, with a longer term and independent from Parliament. The president was the commander-in-chief of the armed forces, head of the cabinet of ministers, and has the power to dissolve and call a parliament. The prime minister would serve as both an assistant and the deputy to the president and also the president's successor.

The 17th Constitutional Amendment introduced in 2001 reduced certain powers of the president, in particular in regard to the appointment of the upper judiciary and independent commissions such as the election commission or the bribery and corruption commission.

In 2010, the highly controversial 18th Amendment to the constitution was introduced in order to remove the two-term limit for the presidency. The 18th amendment allowed the incumbent president to serve multiple terms as well as increase their power by replacing the broader constitutional council with a limited parliamentary council. This amendment was introduced by president Mahinda Rajapaksa and he later went on to run for a third term of presidency in 2015, wherein he was defeated by Maithripala Sirisena.

The 19th Constitutional Amendment undid much of the changes done by the 18th Amendment. The two-term limit was restored by president Maithripala Sirisena. The amendment required the president to consult the prime minister on ministerial appointments. It curtailed any president's immunity by making them liable to fundamental rights litigation on any official act.

In 2022, the country caved into a severe economic crisis, and as result, mass anti-government protests erupted across Sri Lanka. The protesters demanded for then-incumbent president Gotabaya Rajapaksa and his government step down. The protestors also demanded amendments to the Constitution of Sri Lanka and to reduce the powers of the President. After Gotabaya Rajapaksa's resignation, prime minister Ranil Wickremesinghe was elected president by the parliament.

In October 2022, the 21st Constitutional Amendment was introduced as a plan to empower the parliament over the executive president and curbs some of the powers of the president. Under the 21st Amendment, the President, Cabinet of Ministers and National Council are all held accountable to the parliament. Fifteen Committees and Oversight Committees are also accountable to parliament. One of the key provisions in 21st Amendment is disqualifying dual-citizens from contesting in elections in Sri Lanka.

== Selection process ==
=== Eligibility ===
The article 31 Constitution of Sri Lanka sets the following qualifications for holding the presidency:

- "The person is a citizen having been nominated as a candidate for such office by a recognized political party or elected member of the legislature."
- "No person who has been twice elected to the office of President by the People, shall be qualified thereafter to be elected to such office by the People."
- The person can only hold the citizenship of Sri Lanka.

=== Election ===
The president is elected to office in a presidential election held nationwide for a five-year term. An elected president can serve for a maximum of two terms, with each term taking effect from the date of taking a public oath of office for the elected term.

The President of Sri Lanka is elected through a system of limited ranked voting. Voters can express up to three ranked preferences for the presidency. If no candidate receives more than 50% of all valid votes in the first count, all candidates except the two who received the highest number of votes are eliminated. The second and third preference votes of the eliminated candidates are then redistributed to the remaining two candidates until one of them secures an outright majority.

Article 31 (3A)(a)(i) of the Constitution of Sri Lanka, states that, the "President may, at any time after the expiration of four years from the commencement of his first term of office, by Proclamation, declare his intention of appealing to the People for a mandate to hold office, by election, for a second term.” But "A person succeeding to the office of the President under the provisions of article 40 of the constitution shall not be entitled to exercise the right conferred above."

=== Succession or vacancy ===
Succession to or vacancies in the office of president may arise under several possible circumstances: death or incapacity, resignation, or removal from office. In the case when the president is unable to perform their duties, their powers are temporarily transferred to the prime minister until confirmed by Parliament.

According to the Article 40 of the Constitution of Sri Lanka, "If the office of President shall become vacant prior to the expiration of his term of office, Parliament shall elect as President one of its Members who is qualified to be elected to the office of President. Any person so succeeding to the office of President shall hold office only for the unexpired period of the term of office of the President vacating office. Until the election of a successor, the powers and functions of the office of the President will discharged by the Prime Minister in his capacity as Acting president."

Throughout the history, Office of the President has fallen vacant two times; first in 1993, after the Assassination of then President Premadasa and again in 2022, after the resignation of President Rajapaksa. In both times, they were succeeded by then Prime Ministers; D. B. Wijetunga in 1993 and Ranil Wickremesinghe in 2022.

== Term length ==
At the time of the Creation of office in 1972, the term of the office of the President was a term of six years. After the Introduction of the Executive Presidency in 1978, The President is elected by Popular vote and shall hold the office for 6 years and is eligible to serve two terms.

According to the Article 31 (3A) of the Constitution, The Term of office starts from the Date of the Inauguration of the President and he can call an early Presidential election after expiration of 4 years of his first term. If the elected President did not call can early Presidential election, the next Presidential election shall take place not more than two months and not less than one month before the expiration of the term of the incumbent President.

19th Amendment to the Constitution reduced the term of office to Five years and the Incumbent President can call an early Presidential election after the expiration of four years of his first term.

Furthermore, Article 31 (3A) of the Constitution states that an any person succeeding to the office of President under the provisions of Article 40 shall not be entitled to exercise the right to call an early Presidential election and will hold the office till expiration of the term of his Predecessor.

== Powers and duties ==
=== Duties ===
Duties of the president as described in the constitution are to:

- Ensure that the Constitution is respected and upheld;
- Promote national reconciliation and integration;
- Ensure and facilitate the proper functioning of the Constitutional Council and other institutions;
- On the advice of the Election Commission, ensure the creation of proper conditions for the conduct of free and fair elections and referendums.

=== Constitutional powers ===
Presidents have little constraints on their power. The president shall be responsible to Parliament and can be impeached and removed by a two-thirds majority in Parliament. The president may declare war and peace. They can place the country or any part under a state of emergency, under which they can override any law passed and promulgate any regulation without needing legislative approval. However, to prolong the state of emergency for more than 6 months, parliamentary approval is needed. In case of external invasion, a state of national defense can be proclaimed, which allows the government extraordinary powers. Martial law can be declared in provinces under extraordinary conditions. Further, the President can dismiss both the national and state governments from power in 3 situations: corruption, treason, and inability to govern.

=== Parliamentary powers ===
The president has the right to attend Parliament once in every three months, but is not entitled to vote. They have the right to address or send messages to Parliament and to summon, prorogue and dissolve Parliament.

=== Administrative powers ===
The president makes numerous appointments which include the prime minister, cabinet and non-cabinet ministers, provincial governors, public officers, ambassadors and commissioned officers of the armed forces. The president may also appoint secretaries, officers, and staff.

=== Judicial powers ===
The president would have the power to appoint and remove, the chief justice, justices of the Supreme Court, justices of the Court of Appeal and judges of the High Court. The president may grant a pardon. The president has immunity from both civil and criminal proceedings. The president has the power to commission public inquires by appointing a Presidential Commission of Inquiry to investigate any issue.

=== Diplomatic powers ===
President of Sri Lanka is the nation's Chief Diplomat. Through this role, they are responsible for carrying out negotiations with foreign leaders and their governments and appoint diplomatic agents.

=== Ceremonial duties ===
The president has an important ceremonial role in terms of state ceremonies, functions, and awarding state awards. Most notable would be the traditional throne speech delivered by the president to the parliament outlining the official policy statement of the new government to the parliament. The president would lead the independence day celebrations as well as other national ceremonies such as remembrance day, Wap Magul (ceremonial ploughing) and receive the Perahera Sandeshaya. National honours would be awarded by the president on behalf of the government of Sri Lanka. The president would receive letter of credence from foreign ambassadors.

=== Appointments ===
The president may appoint provincial governors to head the provincial council and serve as their representative in the province. The president may also appoint any number of advisers as presidential advisers and coordinate secretaries to assist them.

The president has the power to appoint senior attorneys-at-law to the position of President's Counsel. The president may appoint officers from the armed forces to serve as their aide-de-camp as well as extra-aide-de-camp. Additionally, the president may appoint medical officers of the armed forces as Honorary Physician to the President and Honorary Surgeon to the President.

== Privileges ==
=== Salary ===
The president receives a monthly salary (as of 2016) of LKR 100,000 (≈ $1,000) paid from the consolidated fund. It was increased from LKR 25,000 (≈ $500) to LKR 100,000 in 2006.

=== Tax benefits ===
By tradition, the president and past presidents are not subjected to income tax. This practice dates back to the pre-republic era when the crown was not subject to tax. In 2018, this practice was changed with the Inland Revenue Bill which removed the tax exemption given to the President.

=== Legal immunity ===
The president has immunity from both civil or criminal proceedings, during the tenure of office and acts carried out during this period.

=== Residence ===
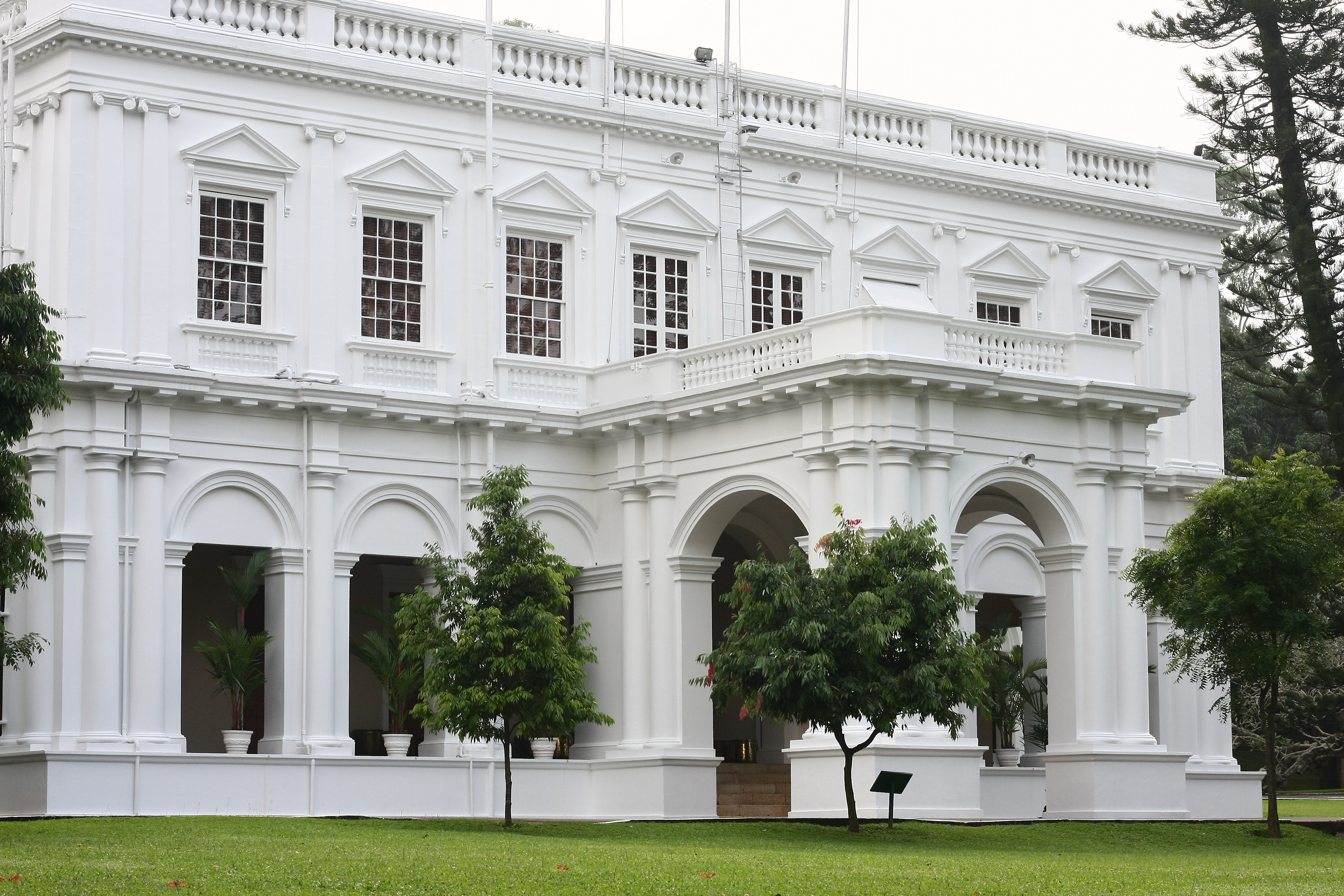
President's Pavilion in Kandy

The official residence of the president in Colombo is the President's House (formerly the Queen's House as the residence of the governor-general). The government pays for meals and staff. Other presidential residences include:

- the President's Pavilion, is the president's second official residence in Kandy;
- the Queen's Cottage is the official presidential vacationing residence in the holiday-town of Nuwara Eliya.

In recent years from time to time Prime Minister's House, commonly referred to as Temple Trees, which has been the traditional residence of the prime minister since 1948, has been used by some presidents such as Kumaratunga and Mahinda Rajapaksa. Other presidents, such as Jayewardene and Sirisena, have refused to use the President's House, with the former preferring to stay at his personal residence in Braemar, and the latter at his former ministerial residence at Wijayarama Mawatha.

=== Travel ===
For ground travel, the president uses the presidential state car, which is an armored black Mercedes-Benz S-Class (S600) Pullman Guard. For Domestic air travel, helicopters from the No. 4 (VVIP/VIP) Helicopter Squadron of the Sri Lanka Air Force are used. For foreign travel, Special or Regular Flights of the SriLankan Airlines are used. During ceremonial occasions, ships and boats of the Sri Lanka Navy have been commissioned as the presidential yacht.

=== Security ===
President's Security Division (PSD) is the main unit charged with the close protection of the President of Sri Lanka. During President Mahinda Rajapakse's time in office the specialized Army unit the 'President's Guard' was formed for Presidential Security. Prior to the formation of the President's Guard, army personnel served as a squadron under the President's Security Division since 1996 and focused on key tasks including the perimeter security of the presidential residence, Temple Trees. 5th Regiment Sri Lanka Armored Corps was the first army unit chosen to be in the dedicated security of the president of Sri Lanka during the presidency of Chandrika Bandaranaike Kumaratunga. However, in April 2015, President Maithripala Sirisena dissolved the President's Guard. Currently the president's security is provided by the elite Special Task Force (STF) of the Sri Lanka Police.

=== Presidential flag (1972−2022) ===
After the oath of office has been taken by the elected president, a presidential flag was adopted by the president as the insignia of their office. Each president had a unique standard, incorporating traditional symbols associated with the president or their home region. This was the case until Acting President Ranil Wickremesinghe abolished the presidential flag.

=== Presidential Dispatch Bag ===
The 'Attaché Case', Presidential Dispatch Bag carries important and secret documents wherever president is traveling. This was specifically designed by Sri Lanka Army. President will hand over the Dispatch Bag from one President to the next in line.

== Presidential staff ==
=== Presidential Secretariat ===
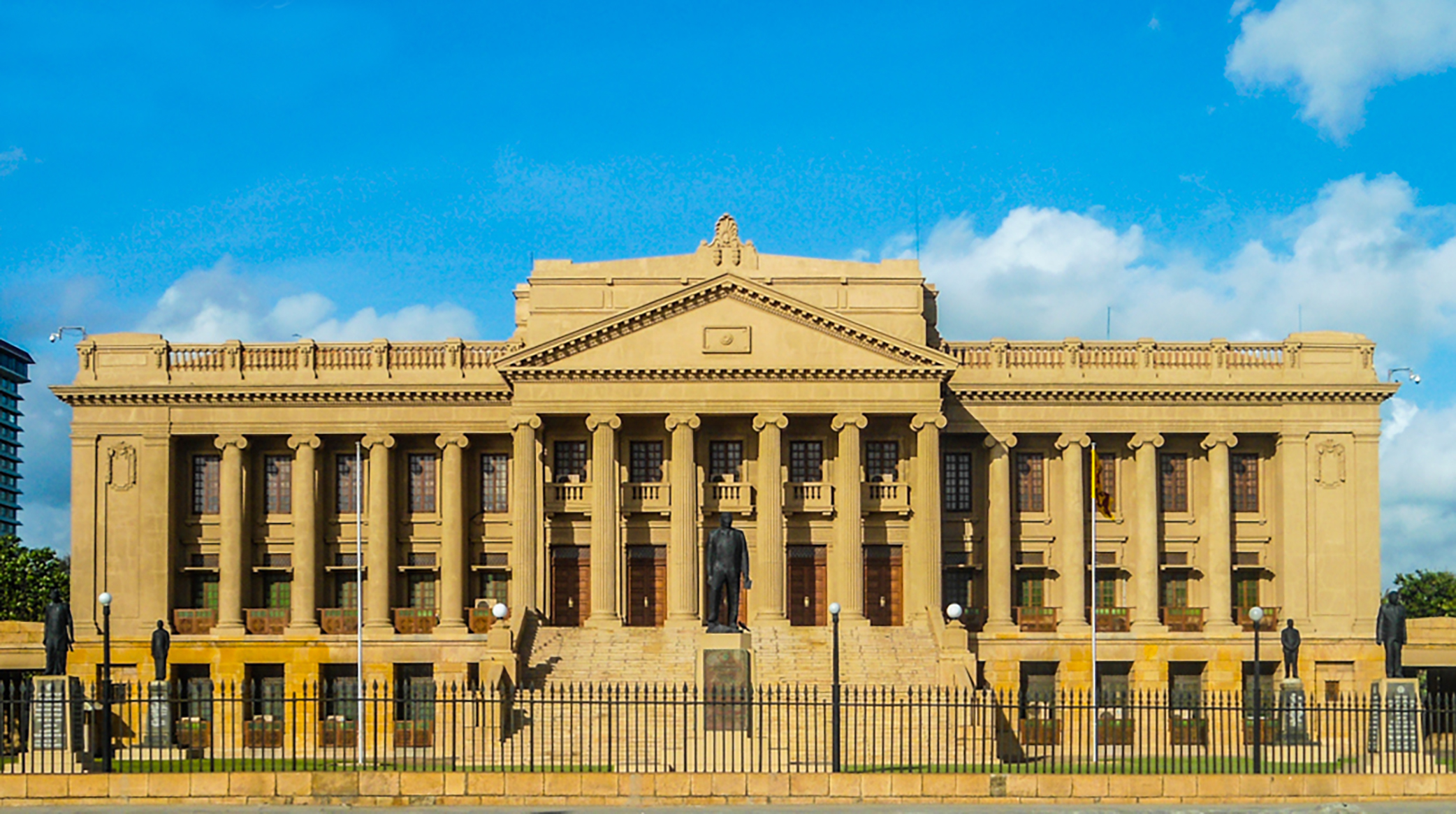
The Presidential Secretariat, formerly Sri Lanka's Parliament building

The Presidential Secretariat is the government ministry that functions as the office and staff of the president, supporting the administrative functions of the presidency and other ministerial portfolios that are held by the president. Initially located at President's House, the staff of the office of the president grew with the establishment of the executive presidency and moved into the former Parliament building in Colombo in the 1980s which now hosts the Presidential Secretariat. The Presidential Secretariat is headed by the secretary to the president (also known as the president's secretary), who is the most senior civil servant in the country.

=== Presidential advisers ===
The president has the ability to appoint any number of advisers as presidential advisers. The highest-ranking of which is known as senior advisers. During his tenure, President Mahinda Rajapaksa had appointed 38 advisers.

=== Chief of staff ===
The chief of staff is the highest-ranking officer that handles presidential staff.Currently the position is vacant after Dissanayake took office in 2024.

=== Coordinating secretaries ===
The president may appoint any number of coordinating secretaries to assist him/her.

== The President's Fund ==
The president is the chair of the Board of Governors of the President's Fund which was established under the President's Fund Act No. 7 of 1978 to provide funds for relief of poverty, access to special healthcare, advancement of education or knowledge, advancement of the religion and culture, providing awards to persons who have served the nation and for any other purposes beneficial or of interest to the public. It is administered by the Presidential Secretariat.

== Post-presidency ==
=== Pension ===
Under the Constitution of Sri Lanka, a former president will be granted a pension equal to the last pay drawn while in office drawn from the Consolidated Fund. This pension would be in addition to any other pension to which any prior service will entitle the individual. A widow of a former president would receive a monthly pension which the former president was entitled to drawn from the Consolidated Fund.

=== Entitlements ===
As per the Presidents’ Entitlements Act No. 4 of 1986, a former president or the widow of a former president is entitled to an official residence. A former president is entitled to a monthly secretarial allowance equal to the current salary of the Private Secretary to the President. A widow of a former president is entitled to a monthly secretarial allowance, equal to the current salary of the Private Secretary to a cabinet minister. A former president and the widow of a former president are entitled to official transport and all such other facilities provided to a cabinet minister.

With the enactment of the Presidents’ Entitlements (Repeal) Act of 2025 in September 2025, all entitlements granted to former presidents and widows of former president under the Presidents’ Entitlements Act No. 4 of 1986 were revoked, resulting in several former presidents having to vacate their government residences and return the government vehicle issued to them. The security for former presidents will be allocated by the Threat Assessment Committee.

=== Order of precedence ===
A former President or the widow of a former president is ranked at the level of a cabinet minister in the order of precedence.

=== Engagement in politics ===
Apart from a bar of standing for election for a third term as President, a former President has no restriction from holding any other office. While most Presidents retired from public life after their tenure, Mahinda Rajapaksa continued to engage in active politics after his term in office, serving as a Member of Parliament for Kurunegala from 2015 to 2024, Leader of the Opposition from 2018 to 2019, and Prime Minister from 2019 to 2022; while Sirisena served as Member of Parliament for Polonnaruwa from 2020 to 2024.

== See also ==
- List of presidents of Sri Lanka
- Prime Minister of Sri Lanka
- Presidential Secretariat
- President's Security Division
- President's Guard
- Official state car of the president of Sri Lanka
- Air transports of heads of government of Sri Lanka
