= Prime Minister's Security Division =

Prime Minister's Security Division (PMSD) is a unit of the Sri Lanka Police charged with the close protection of the Prime Minister of Sri Lanka. It is headed by a gazetted officer of the rank of Deputy Inspector General of Police (DIG). The unit consists of both uniformed and non-uniformed officers who provide close protection and guard Prime Ministerial residences.

== History ==
With the formation of the office of the Prime Minister of Ceylon, an ASP or an IP was assigned for the personal protection of prime minister with a small detachment of police constables, who were usually armed with Lee–Enfield rifles to guard Temple Trees. These policemen lacked special training in close protection. This was highlighted when Prime Minister S W R D Bandaranaike was assassinated at his private residence by Talduwe Somarama. Following the assassination, security was enhanced with a detachment of the Ceylon Army including Ferret armoured cars of the Ceylon Armoured Corps. The need for specialized independent unit was once again highlighted when personal from the internal security detail of the Royal Ceylon Navy, the Provost Branch were brought to guard Temple Trees on the night of 27 January 1962 when the attempted military coup by senior police and military officers was due to be launched. In 1970, the security of the prime minister was assigned to the Field Security Detachment of the Ceylon Army.

With the creation of the Executive Presidency in 1978 the Prime Minister ceased to be the head of government. This reduced the power of the post, however with the escalation of political associations as a result of the Sri Lankan civil war and the JVP Uprising (1988-1989) the security of the Prime Minister increased. For this purpose the Prime Minister's Security Division was officially created in the 1990s with specially trained police officers and Special Task Force personnel attached to it.

On January 5, 2000, personal of the PMSD prevented an assassination attempt by a female suicide bomber of the LTTE, the bomber detonated the bomb outside the Prime Minister's Office killing 13 civilians and three police officers attached to the PMSD.

== See also ==
- President's Guard
- Sri Lanka Police
- President's Security Division
