= President's Guard (Sri Lanka) =

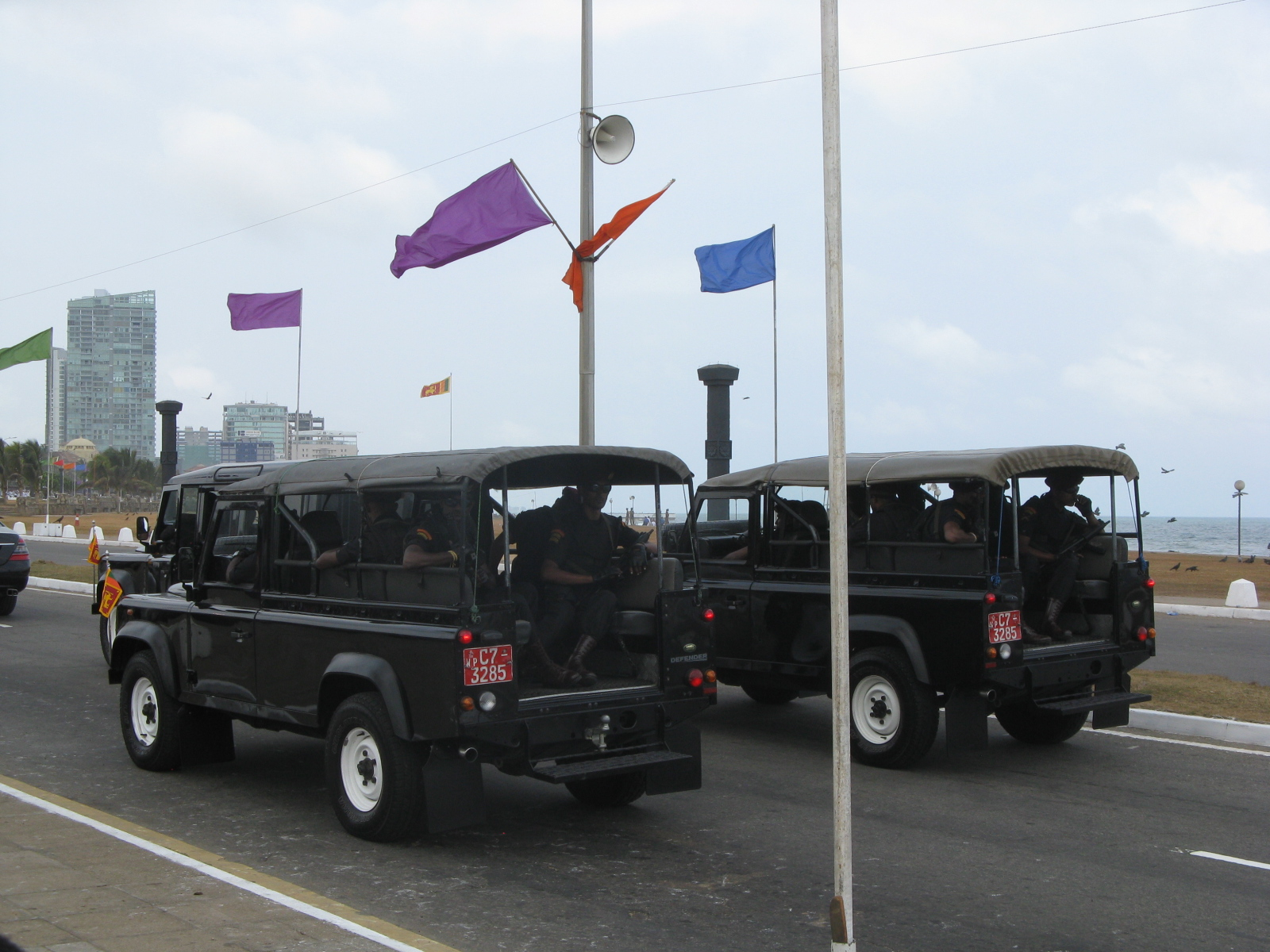
- President's Guard VIP Escort Land Rovers
- Active: 30 October 2008 – 30 April 2015
- Country: Sri Lanka
- Branch: Sri Lanka Army
- Type: Foot Guards
- Role: Close Protection
- Size: 1623
- Regimental Centre: N/A
- Anniversaries: 30 October
- Engagements: Sri Lankan Civil War

Commanders
- Notable commanders: Major General K.J. Alwis

The President's Guard was a former unit of the Sri Lanka Army. It was responsible for the security of the President of Sri Lanka along with the President's Security Division which is the close protection agency of the President. It was made up of personnel from other regiments and units assigned for President's protection.

== Formation ==
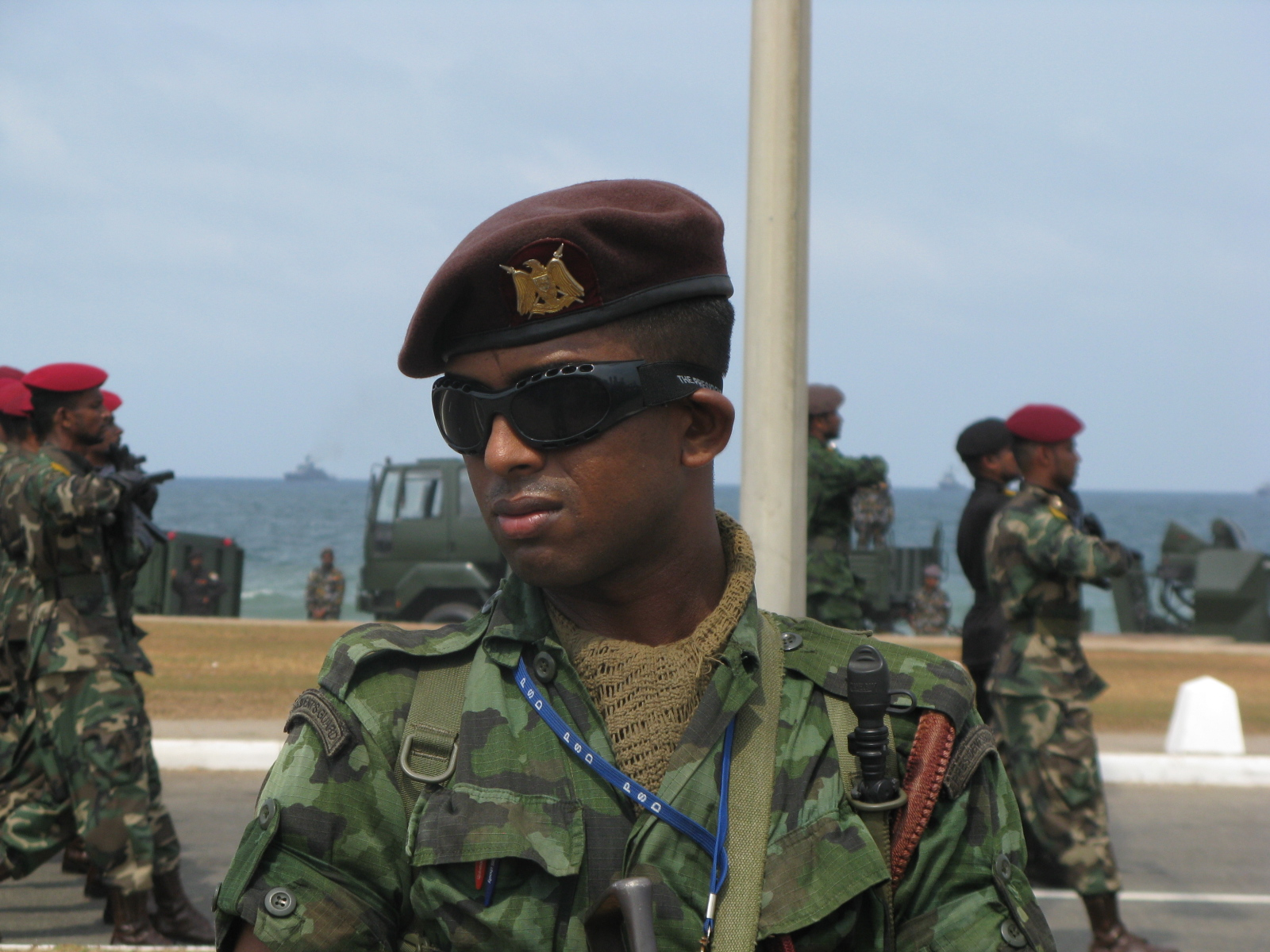
A President's Guardsman.

Since the formation of the Ceylon Army, the Army had allocated personal for the protection of the Governor General and the Prime Minister during peacetime and during emergencies. A permanent detachment of armored cars was present at Temple Trees during the 1960s and 1970s.

Prior to the formation of the President's Guard, army personnel served as a squadron under the President's Security Division since 1996 and focused on key tasks including the perimeter security of Presidential residence, Temple Trees. The 5th Regiment Sri Lanka Armoured Corps was the first army unit chosen to provide the dedicated security for the President of Sri Lanka during the presidency of Chandrika Bandaranaike Kumaratunga. Lieutenant Kushan Perera spearheaded the close protection team of Kumaratunga during her visit to the United States and the United Kingdom. Later the strength of the unit was increased with personnel from the Sri Lanka Light Infantry, Sri Lanka Sinha Regiment and the Gajaba Regiment.

After the unit's formation in 2008, all army personnel came under the command of this unit independent from the President's Security Division which is primarily made up of and commanded by Police personnel. This unit has participated in the Independence Day and victory day parades of 2009.

In April 2015, President Maithripala Sirisena dissolved the President's Guard.
