= National Police Academy (Sri Lanka) =

- Active: 1 December 2008 - present
- Country: Sri Lanka
- Agency: Sri Lanka Police
- Location: Dehiwala
- Motto: Professionalism through Education

Website
- Official website

The National Police Academy is the central training institute for the officers of Sri Lanka Police. It is located in Dehiwala, approximately 11 km south of Colombo City. The academy was established in 2008. The Police Higher Training Institute and the In-Service Training Division was abolished and converted to its divisions.

== Affiliated institutes ==
The following institutes are affiliated to the Police Academy;

- Sri Lanka Police College and its Regional Training Institutes
- Regional In-Service Training Institutes
- Training Institute of the Police Traffic Headquarters
- Training Institute of Police Information Technology Division
- Training Institute of the Crime Division
- Training Institute of the Police Narcotics Bureau
