= Charles Wijewardhana =

Sri Lankan police officer and rugby player

- Born: 5 April 1948
- Died: 4 August 2005 (aged 57); Jaffna, Sri Lanka
- Police career
- Allegiance: Sri Lanka
- Department: Sri Lanka Police Service
- Service years: 1972–2005
- Rank: Deputy Inspector General of Police (Posthumalsy)

Charles Wijewardhana (5 April 1948 – 4 August 2005) was a Sri Lankan police officer and rugby player. He was serving as the Superintendent of Police (SP), Jaffna when he was kidnapped and killed by a mob at Inuvil, Jaffna.

== Career ==
Educated at Vidyartha College, Wijewardhana started playing for the school rugby team in 1965. Following his schooling, he joined the Royal Ceylon Air Force in 1968 and captained the Air Force Sports Club in 1972. He then joined the Sri Lanka Police as a Sub-inspector on 6 August 1972 and captained the Police Sports Club in 1979 winning the Clifford Cup. He had played for the Kandy Sports Club, the CH & FC and the national team. He then served as a rugby referee, and as the official secretary of the Referees Society in 1989 and 1990.

Wijewardhana had served as Assistant Superintendent of Police in Kurunegala for five years before his promotion to the rank of Superintendent and a year later was posted to Jaffna.

== Death ==
Wijewardhana was serving as SP Jaffna during the Norwegian cease-fire agreement, when in the afternoon of 4 August 2005 a barber Jayaseelan Shantharuban was wounded in an accidencial discharge of a service rifle of group of soldiers who had come to the saloon for a haircut in Inuvil, Jaffna. The soldiers fled to their camp 300 m (980 ft) away and Shantharuban was pronounced dead on admission to the Jaffna General Hospital. Within ninety minutes, as word spread of Shantharuban's death, a large crowd gathered at the Inuvil junction and began demanding the surrender of the soldiers, claiming that the shooting was deliberate. Soon the crowd became violent putting up roadblocks by cutting down trees, pelting stones at vehicles and burning tyres, disrupting traffic on the main Jaffna-Kankesanthurai road. Police officers from nearby Achchuveli and Chunnakam police stations were rushed along with a riot squad to control the mob. The riot squad engaged the rioters for two hours. Wijewardena arrived with police reinforcements, as the senior officer present, Wijewardena ordered his men to hold their position and proceeded alone into the crowd to talk to them in an attempt to calm the situation, as he had done in a previous similar situation. As dusk was setting in, the police officers did not see Wijewardena being abducted and soon realised that he was missing. The police immediately informed the Scandinavian representatives of the Sri Lanka Monitoring Mission about the disappearance of the officer while a search operation was mounted. Mallakam Magistrate, Sarjoini Illangovan who had been preparing to go to the barber salon to conduct the inquiry into the shooting was informed that Wijewardena's body had been spotted 2 km (1.2 mi) away from the location he was abducted. The magistrate visited the location at Palavodai along the Inuvil-Sudhumalai road where Wijewardena's body had been found. His body retained his police uniform tunic, yet the uniform trousers had been removed and he was clad in a sarong. His body had cut and stab injuries, and the Magistrate ordered an autopsy. The police arrested and produced the five soldiers before the Magistrate and two soldiers were remanded in custody.

He was posthumously promoted to the rank of Senior Superintendent of Police, prior to his funeral, on 7 August 2005 at the General Cemetery in Kurunegala, with full police honours. His wife and three children, were living in official quarters in Kurunegala at the time of his death. He was subsequently promoted to the rank of Deputy Inspector General of Police.

== Aftermath ==
The police arrested the main suspect in the murder, Weerapandian Gopi, a LTTE member. During the arrest, the police officers were attacked by LTTE cadres wounding two officers. Subsequently the Criminal Investigation Department sought permission from the Attorney General's Department to transfer the murder case to Colombo from Jaffna due to threats from the LTTE.
