= President's Security Division =

President's Security Division (PSD) is a unit of the Sri Lanka Police charged with the close protection of the President of Sri Lanka. It is headed by a gazetted officer of the rank of Deputy Inspector General of Police (DIG). Until 2008 the unit was controlled by army personnel assigned to President's protection, later these were absorbed into an independent unit named the President's Guard (dissolved in 2015). The unit consists of both uniformed and non-uniformed officers who provide close protection and guard Presidential residences.

It is not to be confused with the President’s Ceremonial Guard Company of the Corps of Military Police assigned to ceremonial duties.

== See also ==
- President's Guard
- Prime Minister's Security Division
