= Traffic Police (Sri Lanka) =

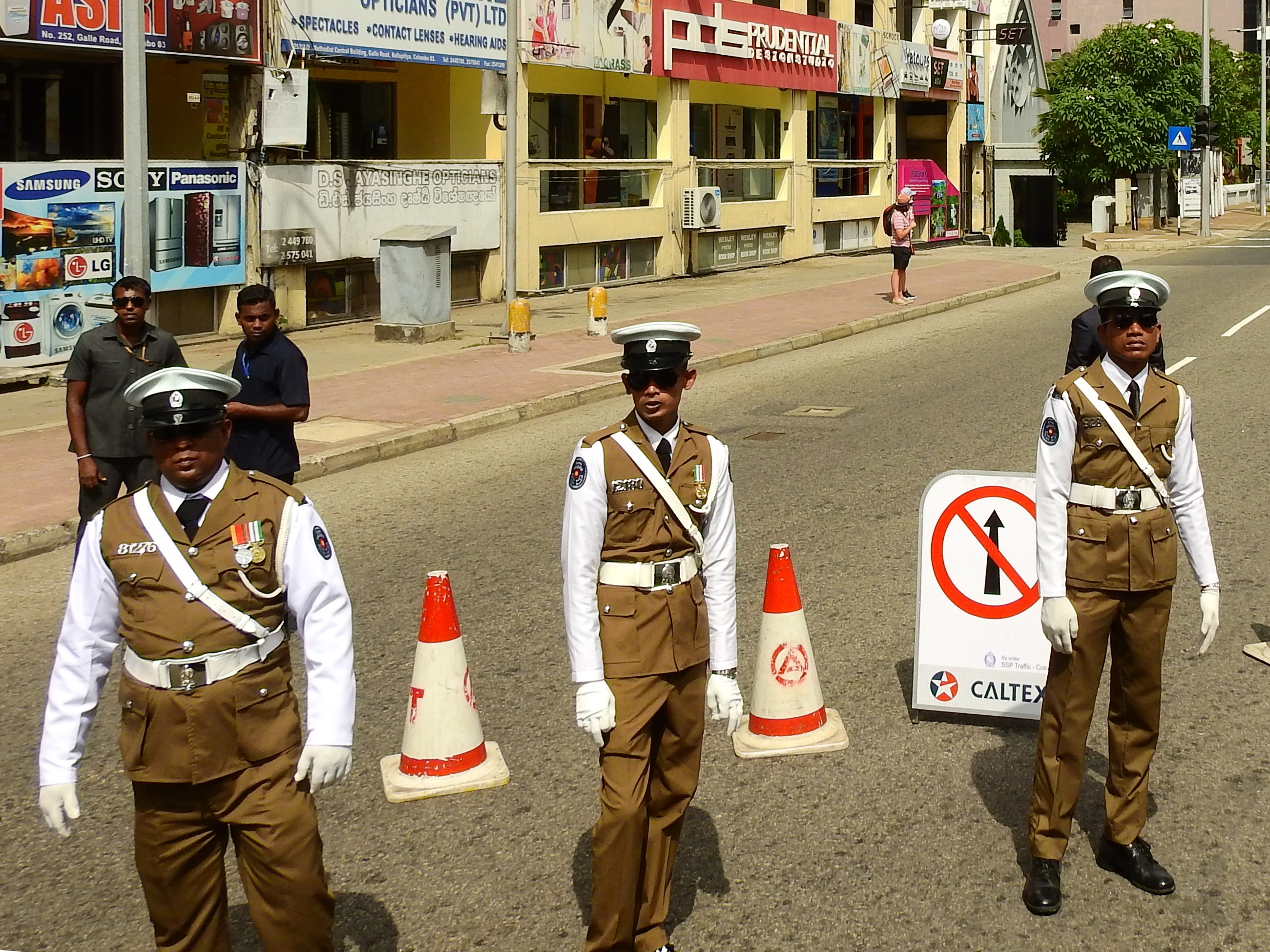
Sri Lanka Traffic Police uniform.

The Traffic Police is a specialized unit of the Sri Lanka Police responsible for overseeing and enforcing traffic safety compliance on roads and highways. It is headed by the Director of Traffic, in recent times a senior gazetted officer of the rank of Deputy Inspector General of Police (DIG). Therefore, the post is also referred to as DIG - Traffic.

== History ==
With the enactment of the Motor Traffic Act of 1950, the Colombo Metropolitan Police identified the need for a unit for traffic control in the city of Colombo. This unit was formed in 1951 and was expanded in 1953 to cover the whole island with the establishment of the Traffic Police Headquarters.

== Units ==
Administration of the unit is carried out by the Traffic Police Headquarters, while there is a Traffic Unit in all police stations island wide.

== Duties ==
- Enforcement of traffic safety compliance
- Investigation of Motor accidents
- Piloting VIP transport details
- Traffic control during road closures

== Uniform ==
Traffic police officers can be identified by the white colour peaked caps, cross belts and belts they wear on the standard police uniform.

== See also ==
- Highway patrol

== External links and references ==
- Sri Lanka Police.
- Sri Lanka Crime Trends
- Duty of police to make roads safer for users - DIG, Traffic
- DIG Traffic
