= Castle Company =

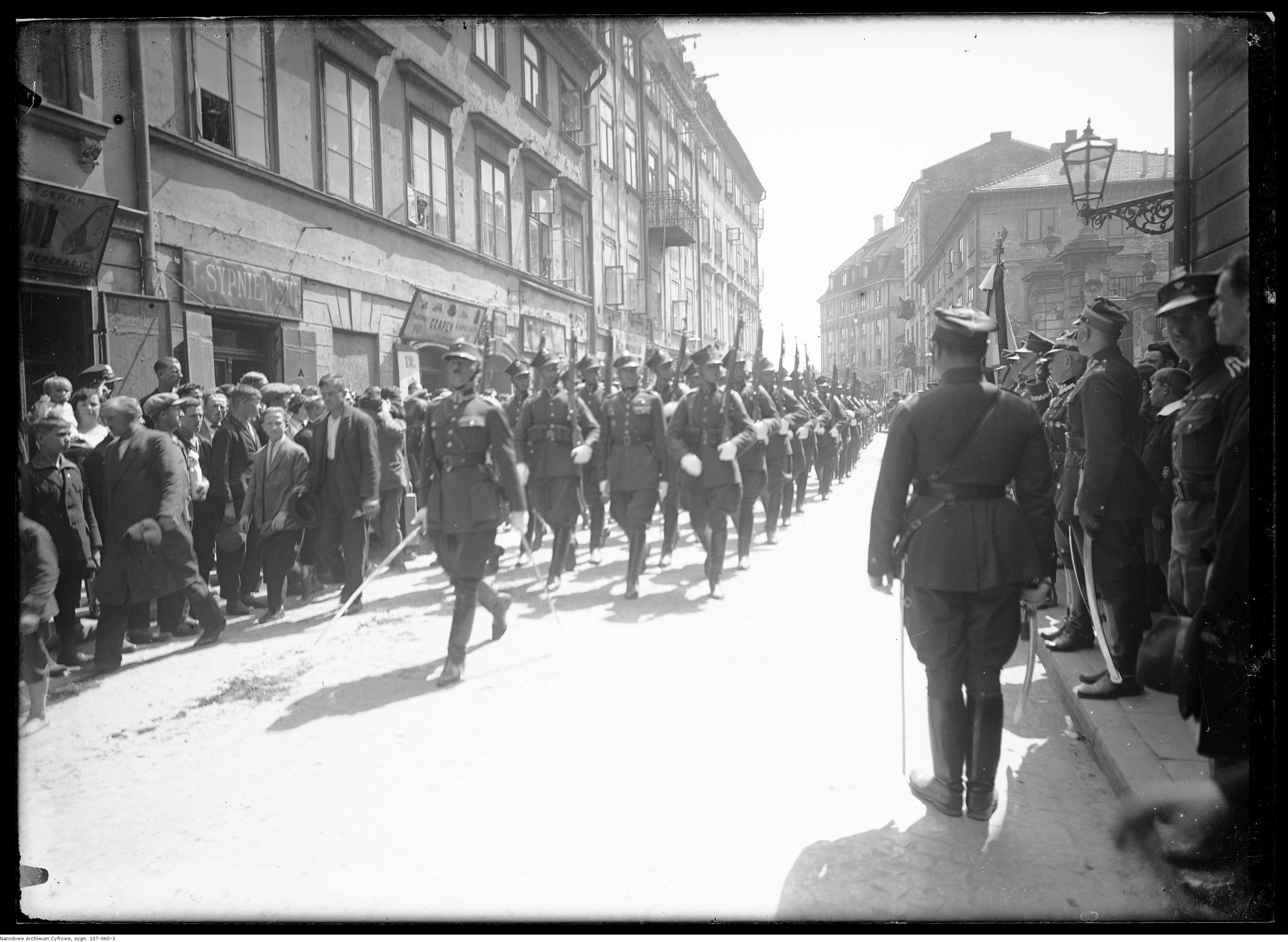
The company in Warsaw.

Kompania Zamkowa (Castle Company) was the military unit the size of an infantry company, responsible for providing protection for the President of the Republic of Poland from 1926 to 1939. They also had a ceremonial function.

Castle Company, named after Royal Castle, Warsaw, then a presidential residence, consisted of:

- Commanding squad
- Three infantry platoons
- Heavy machine gun platoon
- Gendarmerie platoon

The Company was created after disbanding the Presidential military office and the previous protective squad. It was formed from the 36th Infantry Regiment of the Academic Legion. The only President under its protection was Ignacy Mościcki.

Members of the unit wore "OZ" insignia on the epaulettes of their uniforms.

In 1928 Company was merged with a castle motorcade, gendarmerie platoon and horse unit to for the Castle Unit.

Commanders:

- Major Stanisław Kłopotowski
- Captain Witold Grębo
- Captain Zygmunt Roszkowski
- Major Wiktor Gębalski
