= Sri Lanka Police =

Civilian national police force of Sri Lanka

Sri Lanka Police ශ්‍රී ලංකා පොලීසිය இலங்கை பொலிஸ்
- Crest

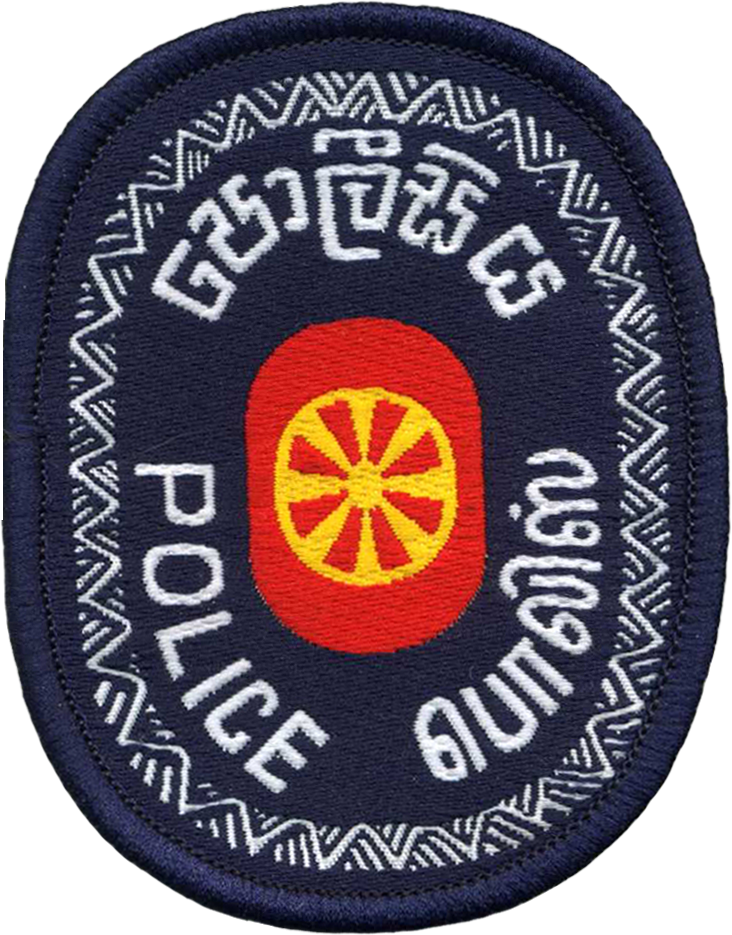
- Shoulder flash with languages Sinhalese, English and Tamil around a Dhammachakra Wheel

- Flag
- Motto: Pali: ධම්මො හවෙ රකඛති ධම්මචාරි, romanized: Dhammo Havē Rakkhathi Dhammacāri (The one who lives by the Dhamma is protected by the Dhamma itself)

Agency overview
- Formed: 3 September 1866; 160 years ago
- Preceding agency: Ceylon Police Force (1866–1972)
- Employees: 76,139 (2016)
- Annual budget: Rs 64.1 billion (2016)

Jurisdictional structure
- National agency (Operations jurisdiction): Sri Lanka
- Operations jurisdiction: Sri Lanka
- Legal jurisdiction: As per operations jurisdiction
- Governing body: Government of Sri Lanka
- General nature: Civilian police

Operational structure
- Overseen by: National Police Commission
- Headquarters: Police Headquarters, Church Street, Colombo 1
- Elected officer responsible: Ananda Wijepala, Minister of Public Security
- Agency executive: Priyantha Weerasooriya, Inspector General of Police
- Parent agency: Ministry of Public Security
- Child agencies: Special Task Force; Criminal Investigation Department; Terrorist Investigation Department; Police Narcotic Bureau; Children & Women Bureau; Marine Division

Facilities
- Stations: 432
- Police cars: Hyundai Elantra, Mitsubishi Lancer GLX
- Police SUVs: Toyota Land Cruiser (J70), Mitsubishi Montero, Tata Sumo
- Police Motorcycles: Yamaha FJR1300P, BMW R1200GS, Yamaha XT250, Yamaha FZ6R, Suzuki GN250

Notables
- Award: Awards and decorations of the Sri Lanka Police

Website
- www.police.lk

Sri Lanka Police (Sinhala: ශ්‍රී ලංකා පොලීසිය, romanized: Śrī Laṁkā Polīsiya; Tamil: இலங்கை காவல், romanized: Ilaṅkai Kāval) is the civilian national police force of the Democratic Socialist Republic of Sri Lanka. The police force is responsible for enforcing criminal and traffic law, enhancing public safety, maintaining order and keeping the peace throughout Sri Lanka. The police force consists of 43 Territorial Divisions, 67 Functional Divisions, 607 Police Stations with more than 84,000 people. The professional head of the police is the Inspector General of Police who reports to the Ministry of Public Security as well as the National Police Commission. The current Inspector General of Police is Priyantha Weerasooriya.

During the Sri Lankan civil war, the police service became an integral part of maintaining of the nation's security, primarily focusing on internal security. Many police officers have been killed in the line of duty mainly due to terrorist attacks.

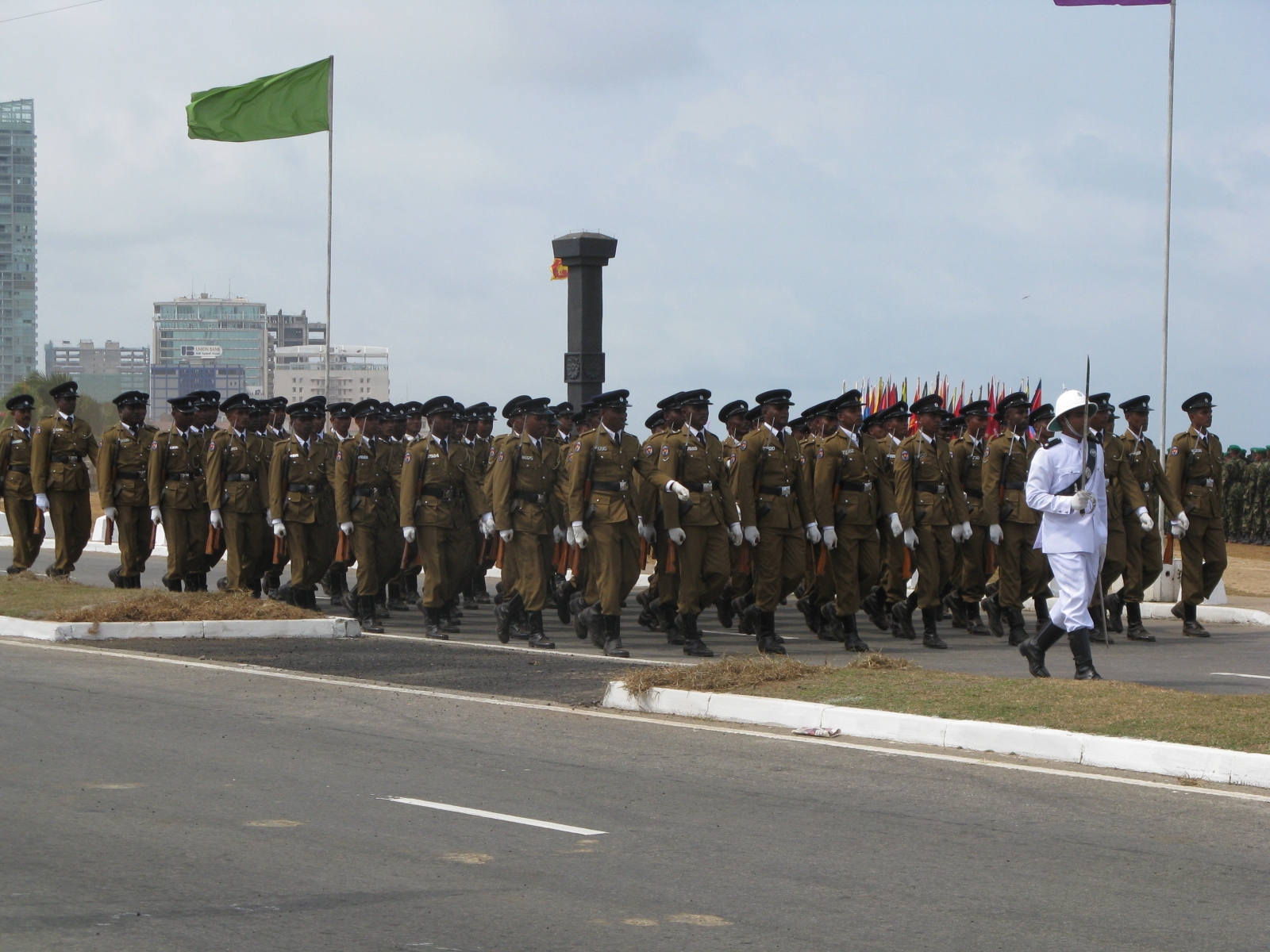
Sri Lanka Police officers on independence day parade

Specially trained commando/counter-terrorist units named Special Task Force are deployed in joint operations with the armed forces for counter-terrorism operations and VVIP protection. The police command structure in Northern and Eastern provinces is closely integrated with the other security organisations under the authority of the Joint Operations Command.

The Police service can be reached across Sri Lanka on the 119 emergency number.

== Roles ==
- Law enforcement
  - Fighting crime
  - Carrying out investigations
  - Drug enforcement
- Security of police
  - Keeping public security
  - Maintaining public order
  - Counter-terrorism
  - Securing public events, rallies and holidays
  - Riot control / crowd control
  - Intelligence services
  - Providing VIP security (VVIP security is handled by the Special Task Force)
  - Handling suspicious objects and bomb disposal (EOD) (handled by the Special Task Force)
  - Handling the local command of the Home Guard
  - Assisting the Prison Service in prisoner transport and control of prison unrest
- Road safety and Traffic control
- Coordinating emergency services
- Police and community
  - Handling civilian complaints
  - Handling youth violence and crime
  - Educating the community and participating in educational campaigns
  - Providing ceremonial escorts to the President, the Prime Minister and foreign ambassadors on state functions
  - Assist and coordinate community policing

== Offences investigated ==
- Offences against the State.
- Offences relating to the Navy, Army and Air Force.
- Offences relating to the Elections.
- Offences relating to Coins, Currency and Government Stamps.
- Any Offence committed against the President.
- Any Offence committed against a Public Officer, a Judicial Officer, or the Speaker, or the Prime Minister or a Minister, or a Member of the Judicial Service Commission, or a Member of the Public Service Commission or a Deputy Minister or a Member of Parliament or the Secretary General of Parliament or a Member of the President's Staff or a Member of the Staff of the Secretary General of Parliament.
- Any Offence relating to property belonging to the State or a State Corporation or Company or Establishment, the whole or part of the capital whereof has been provided by the State.
- Any Offence prejudicial to National Security or the maintenance of Essential Services.
- Any Offence under any law relating to any matter in the Reserve List other than such offences as the President may, by order published in the Gazette, exclude.
- Any Offence in respect of which Courts in more than one Province have jurisdiction.
- International Crimes.

== History ==
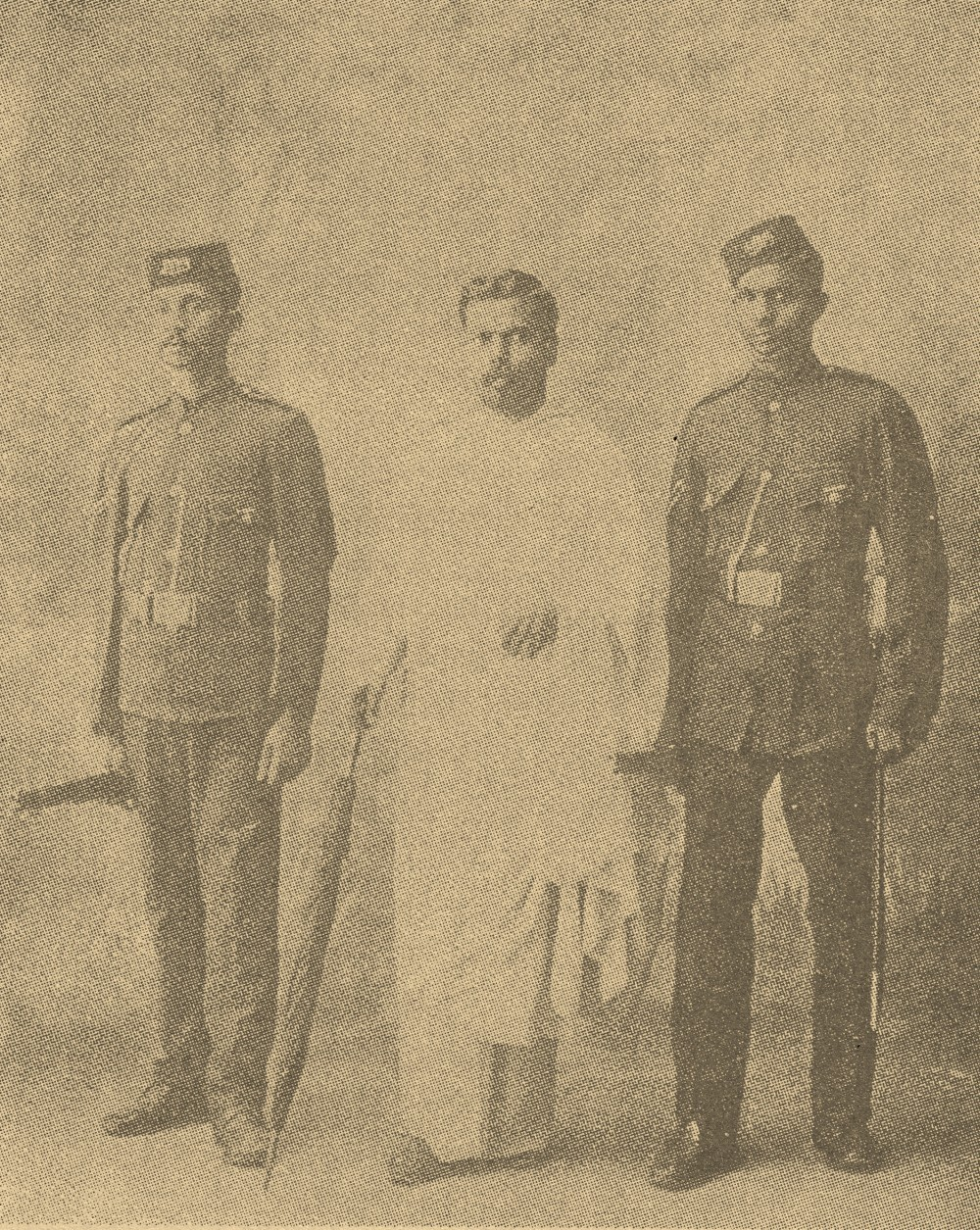
Police Constables with Walisinghe Harischandra following his arrest in 1903.

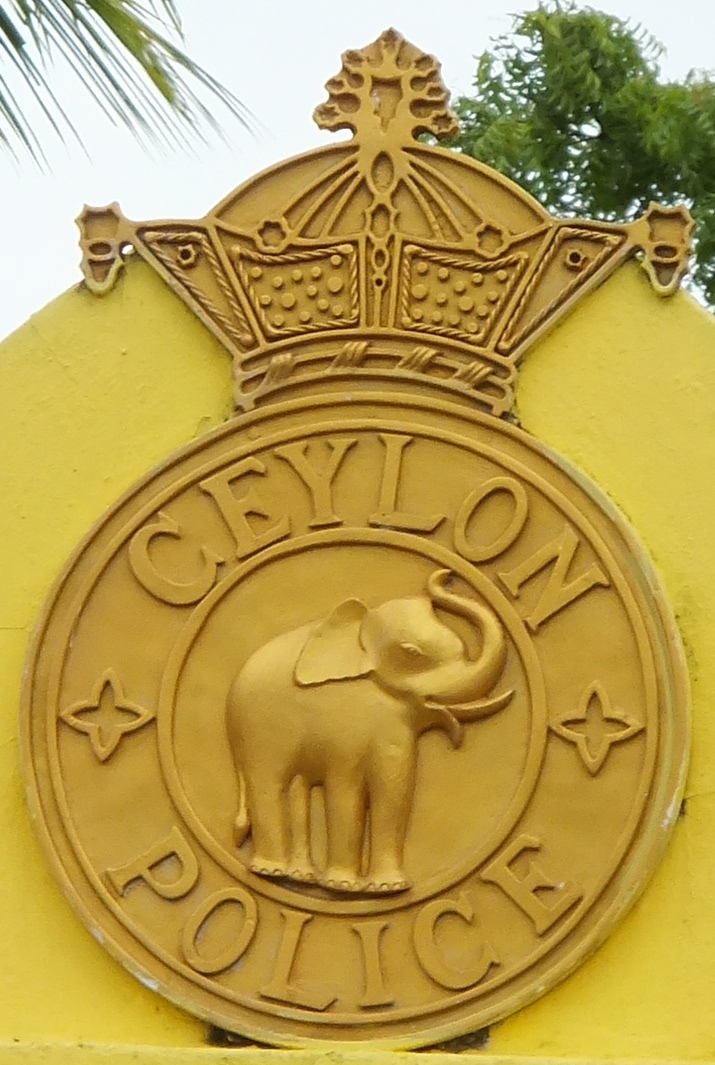
Seal of the Ceylon Police Force

Timeline of significant events:

1797: The office of Fiscal was created. Fredric Barron Mylius was appointed as Fiscal of Colombo and entrusted with responsibility of policing Colombo.

1806: The regulation No. 6 of 1806 appointed a Vidane Arachchi to each town or village, for prevention and detection of crime in rural areas.

1832: A committee appointed by the governor was instructed to form a police force. It was decided by this committee that the new police force was to be funded by a tax to be paid by the public. It consisted of one Superintendent, one Chief Constable, five Constables, ten Sergeants and 150 Peons. They were responsible for maintaining law and order in the capital city of Colombo.

1844: As the police force was restricted to coastal areas only, a second police force was created to cater to the country's interior.

1858: The police force in the coastal area and the police force in the hill country were unified and amalgamated.

1864: The first death of a police officer whilst on duty occurred when he attempted to apprehend a brigand by the name of "Saradiel", who was subsequently compared to Robin Hood.

1865: The Police Ordinance was enacted to stipulate the powers and responsibilities of policemen.

1866: William Robert Campbell, then the chief of police in the Indian province of Rathnageri, was appointed as Chief Superintendent of Police in Ceylon on 3 September 1866. This date is considered as the beginning of the Sri Lanka Police Service.

1867: The Chief of Police was designated as the Inspector General of Police. William Robert Campbell became the first Inspector General of Police. The Police Headquarters was founded at Maradana, in the City of Colombo.

1870: Muslim rioters attacked the Police Headquarters. The police were successful in repulsing the attack, but the building was damaged. This year, the Criminal Investigations Department (CID) was formed.

1879: The strength of the police force had tripled from 585 when IGP Campbell was appointed, to a force of 1528. The first police firing range, training college and the publishing of the annual administration report emerged during this year.

1892: The Depot Police presently known as the Field Force Headquarters was formed. Uniforms and housing were made free for police officers. The payment of a Good Conduct Allowance was initiated.

1908: Fingerprinting and photographing of criminals were initiated, along with the direct recruitment to the rank of Assistant Superintendents of Police.

1913: Herbert Layard Dowbiggin was appointed as the 8th Inspector General of Police. 119 police stations were in operation with a total strength of 2306.

1915: For the first time two officers were appointed as Deputy Inspectors General of Police.

1916: 0.22-caliber rifles were issued in place of shotguns.

1920: For the first time, police officers were deployed for the purpose of controlling traffic.

1923: A book containing comprehensive details regarding all aspects of the police, the Departmental Order Book, was formulated.

1926: The Sport Division was established.

1930: A handbook of traffic rules and regulations was issued for traffic duties.

1932: The Police Headquarters was moved from Maradana to its present location in Colombo Fort.

1938: Police telephone boxes were deployed throughout the city of Colombo.

1942: Temporary forces were employed, known as Temporary Police Constables.

1945: Police units were deployed at all hospitals. Additional units were also deployed for railway security. However, in the following year, the railway police force was discontinued as a necessity for it did not arise.

1952: Women were enrolled to the police force for the first time. VHF radios were introduced for communication. It was decided that in honour of police officers killed in the line of duty, state funerals with full police honours would be held. In addition the police flag would be flown at half mast throughout the country.

1954: Police stations were graded into five classifications, Grades "E" to "A". The grading of police stations was considered depending on the workload, population, locality, crimes, important institutions, etc., in the area.

1963: Divisions in the police were made as North, Central, South, Administration, and Criminal Investigation Department. D. B. I. P. S. Siriwardane, a civil servant, was the first civilian to be appointed as the Deputy Inspector of Police in charge of Administration.

1966: The Police Public Relations Division was established on 1 October 1966, at Police Headquarters, Colombo.

1969: The Tourist Police and the Illicit Immigration sector were established in March 1969.

1972: The Crime Detective Bureau was started on 1 August 1972.

1973: On 15 August 1973 the Police Narcotics Bureau was started. The Colombo Fraud Investigation Bureau was also established.

1974: The uniforms for constables and sergeants were changed.

1976: The rank of Woman Police Sub Inspector was introduced. Two women police officers were promoted to the rank of Sub Inspector.

1978: The Police Higher Training Institute was established.

1979: The Children & Women Bureau was established.

1983: The Police Special Task Force was established.

1985: A new promotion scheme was introduced from the rank of Police Constable up to the rank of Inspector of Police.

1988: A Woman Police Inspector was promoted to the rank of Assistant Superintendent of Police.

1989: Women were recruited and enlisted as Sub Inspectors.

1991: The Sri Lanka Police celebrated 125 years of policing in Sri Lanka.

1993: The Police Information Technology Division was established.

1998: The Marine Division was established.

1999: The Ombudsman Division was established.

2000: The Police Examination Division was established.

2002: Human Rights Division and Disappearances Investigation Unit established.

2004: The Judicial Security Division was established.

2005: The Colombo Crime Division was established.

2006: The Reserve Police Force was abolished and its officers were transferred to the regular police force.

2008: The Police Academy was established in 2008 with the amalgamation of the Police Higher Training Institute and the In-Service Training Division, which are now divisions of the Sri Lanka Police Academy.

Now there are 607 Police Stations in Sri Lanka

== Organisation ==
The Sri Lanka Police is headed by the Inspector General of Police, who has, in theory, autonomy to commanding the service from the Police Headquarters in Colombo, and support by the Police Field Force Headquarters. However, in the recent past the Police Service has come under the purview of the Ministry of Defence (MoD), with the exception of several years when it came under the Ministry of Internal Affairs but was transferred to the MoD. In the last few years there have been calls to reestablish the independent National Police Commission to oversee transfers and promotions, thereby making the service autonomous and free from any influence.

The police service is organised into five primary geographic commands, known as ranges (Range I, II, III, IV, V), covering the northern, western, eastern and southern sectors of the island under the command of a Senior Deputy Inspector General of Police (SDIG). The ranges were subdivided into divisions, districts, and police stations; Colombo was designated as a special range. Each police division headed by a Deputy Inspector General of Police (DIG) covers a single province, and a police district headed by a Senior Superintendent of Police (SSP) covers a single district of the country. In 1913 there were a total of 119 police stations throughout the country, that number has increased to 432 in 2020.

With the escalation of the Sri Lankan Civil War the strength and the number of stations have increased. Since 1971 the police service has suffered large number of casualties, with officers and constables killed and wounded as a result of terrorists and insurgents. In more remote rural areas beyond the immediate range of existing police stations, enforcement of simple crimes are carried out by the Grama Seva Niladhari (village service officers), but this has now become rare, with most villages covered by new police stations.

In addition to its regular forces, the police service operated a reserve contingent until 2007 when the Reserve Police Force was disbanded and its personnel transferred to the regular police force. The police service has a number of specialised units responsible for investigative, protective, counter-terrorism and paramilitary functions.

Investigation of organised criminal activity and detective work are handled by the Criminal Investigation Department (CID) under the command of a Deputy Inspector General of Police (DIG). More coordinated threats to internal security, such as that posed by the radical Sinhalese JVP in the 1980s, were the responsibility of the Counter Subversive Division, which was primarily an investigative division, and which has since been replaced by the Terrorist Investigation Department (TID). The TID carries out counter-terrorism investigations and threats to internal security from the LTTE.

Protective security units which are entrusted the security includes the Ministerial Security Division (elected public figures), Diplomatic Security Division (foreign diplomats) and Judicial Security Division (judges). The President's Security Division and the Prime Minister's Security Division function independently but consist of mostly police personnel.

Other specialised units includes the Information Technology Division, the Mounted Division, the Anti-riot Squad, Traffic Police, K9 units, the Marine Division, the Police Narcotic Bureau, and the Children & Women Bureau. The police service also operates the Sri Lanka Police College of personnel training and the Police Hospital.

Special Task Force

Special Task Force is one of the special operational units in the Police Service. This police paramilitary force was set up on 1 March 1983 with the assistance of foreign advisers (primarily former British Special Air Service personnel under the auspices of Keeny Meeny Services). Its 1,100-member force was organised into seven companies and trained in counterinsurgency techniques. It played a major role in the government's combined force operations against the Tamil Tigers in Eastern Province before July 1987. Following the signing of the Indo-Sri Lankan Accord, the Special Task Force was redesignated the Police Special Force, and deployed in the Southern Province, where it immediately went into action against the JVP terrorists. Companies of the force also served in rotation as part of the presidential security guard.

Internal intelligence

Until 1984 the police were responsible for national (local) intelligence functions, first under the Special Branch (est. 1966 as part of the CID), and later under the Intelligence Services Division. The perceived failure of the Intelligence Services Division during the riots of July 1983 led the J.R. Jayawardene government to reevaluate the nation's intelligence network, and in 1984 the president set up a National Intelligence Bureau. The new organisation combined intelligence units from the army, navy, air force, and police. It was headed by a deputy inspector general of police who reported directly to the Ministry of Defence.

=== Specialised units and divisions ===
Protective units

- President's Security Division
- Prime Minister's Security Division
- Ministerial Security Division
- Parliament Police Division
- Judicial Security Division
- Diplomatic Security Division

Counter-terrorist units

- Special Task Force (STF)
- Terrorist Investigation Division (TID)

Crime-investigation units

- Criminal Investigation Department (CID)
- Colombo Crime Division
- Police Narcotic Bureau
- Financial Crimes Investigation Division (FCID)
- Children & Women Bureau
- Disappearances Division
- Human Rights Division

Law enforcement

- Traffic Police
- Tourist Police
- Anti-Riot Squad
- Police Kennels (K9 units)
- Ombudsman Division
- Strategic Development Division (community policing)

Support units

- Mounted Division
- Marine Division
- Sri Lanka Police Academy
- Police Examination Division
- Police Hospital, Colombo

Technology infrastructure

- Police Information Technology Division
- Police Communication Division
- Police CCTV Division
- Police Public Relations Division
- Police Tell IGP Unit
- Police 119 Call Center

== Peacekeeping and international deployments ==
In recent years members of the Sri Lanka Police have taken part in international deployments either as advisers, observers or seconded police officers for United Nations missions. These include:

- Since 2002, Sri Lankan Police personnel have taken part in several United Nations peacekeeping missions worldwide;
  - United Nations Mission of Support to East Timor
  - United Nations Stabilization Mission in Haiti
  - United Nations Mission in Sudan
  - United Nations Mission in Liberia
- Special Task Force personnel have been assisting the Chinese police for the 2008 Beijing Olympics in dealing with possible terrorist threats.

== Ranks ==
=== Senior officers ===
| | Gazetted Ranks |
|---|---|---|---|---|---|---|---|---|---|
| Sri Lanka Police |
| Sri Lanka Police | Inspector general of police (IGP) | Senior deputy inspector general of police (SDIG) | Deputy inspector general of police (DIG) | Senior superintendent of police (SSP) | Superintendent of police (SP) | Assistant superintendent of police (ASP) | Chief inspector of police (CIP) | Inspector of police (IP) | Sub inspector of police (SI) |

=== Other ranks ===
| | Sergeants | | | Constables |
|---|---|---|---|---|---|---|---|
| Sri Lanka Police |
| Sri Lanka Police | Police sergeant major (PSM) | Police sergeant class 1 (PS) | Police sergeant class 2 (PS) | Police constable class 1 (PC) | Police constable class 2 (PC) | Police constable class 3 (PC) | Police constable class 4 (PC) |

=== Gazetted officers ===
A gazetted officer is a police officer in the Sri Lanka Police Service whose name is published in the Police Gazette of Sri Lanka. They are equal to commissioned officers.

== Requirement ==
Requirement to the police service is carried out at four stages. These stages are based upon the entry ranks and educational qualifications of the recruits.

- Probationary Assistant Superintendent of Police - Male/female graduates (aged 22–26 years) may apply and must face an entrance exam.
- Probationary Sub Inspector of Police - Males/females who have passed GCE Advanced Levels (aged 18–25 years) may apply and must face an endurance test and a written exam.
- Police Constable - Males who have passed GCE Ordinary Levels (aged 18–25 years) may apply and must face an endurance test and a written exam.
- Women Police Constable - Females who have passed GCE Ordinary Levels (aged 18–25 years) may apply and must face an endurance test and a written exam.
- Police Constable Drivers - Those who complete up to grade 7 at school or higher with valid driving license (aged 19–35 years) may apply and must face an endurance test and a written exam.

== Composition of the police service ==
Since its establishment in the 19th century, the police service has been a centrally controlled national police force. Due to this, its personnel are not recruited and deployed provincially. During the colonial period much of its senior officers were British, with lower ranks made up of natives. However this composition did not mirror the racial composition of the island. Many of the locals in the Ceylon Police Force were Burghers, followed by Sinhalese and Tamils. This was common in the government sector and continued until the mid-1950s. Following political efforts to balance the racial composition of the police service to mirror that of society, and due to the civil war, the composition has become imbalanced once again, with the majority of the officers being Sinhalese. Currently steps are being taken to address this and personnel of all entry levels are recruited from all racial groups of the island.

== Uniforms ==
=== Historical ===
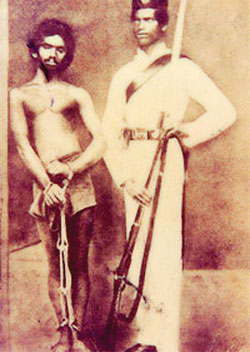
Ceylonese policeman in colonial uniform shown here after arresting the well known Sri Lankan bandit Sura Saradiel's lifelong friend Mammale Marikkar

With the establishment of the Ceylon Police in 1866, standard uniforms based on the ones of the British police forces were adapted. Officers of the grade of Inspector and above who were mostly British wore white colonial uniforms, which are still used today for ceremonial occasions. Constables wore dark blue tunics, shorts and a black round cap with a collar number. Khaki uniforms were adopted by the beginning of the 20th century for practical reasons, along with other military and police units of the British Empire. This was common for all ranks, with the constables wearing khaki tunics, shorts and hat, while always armed with a baton until 1974.

=== Current ===
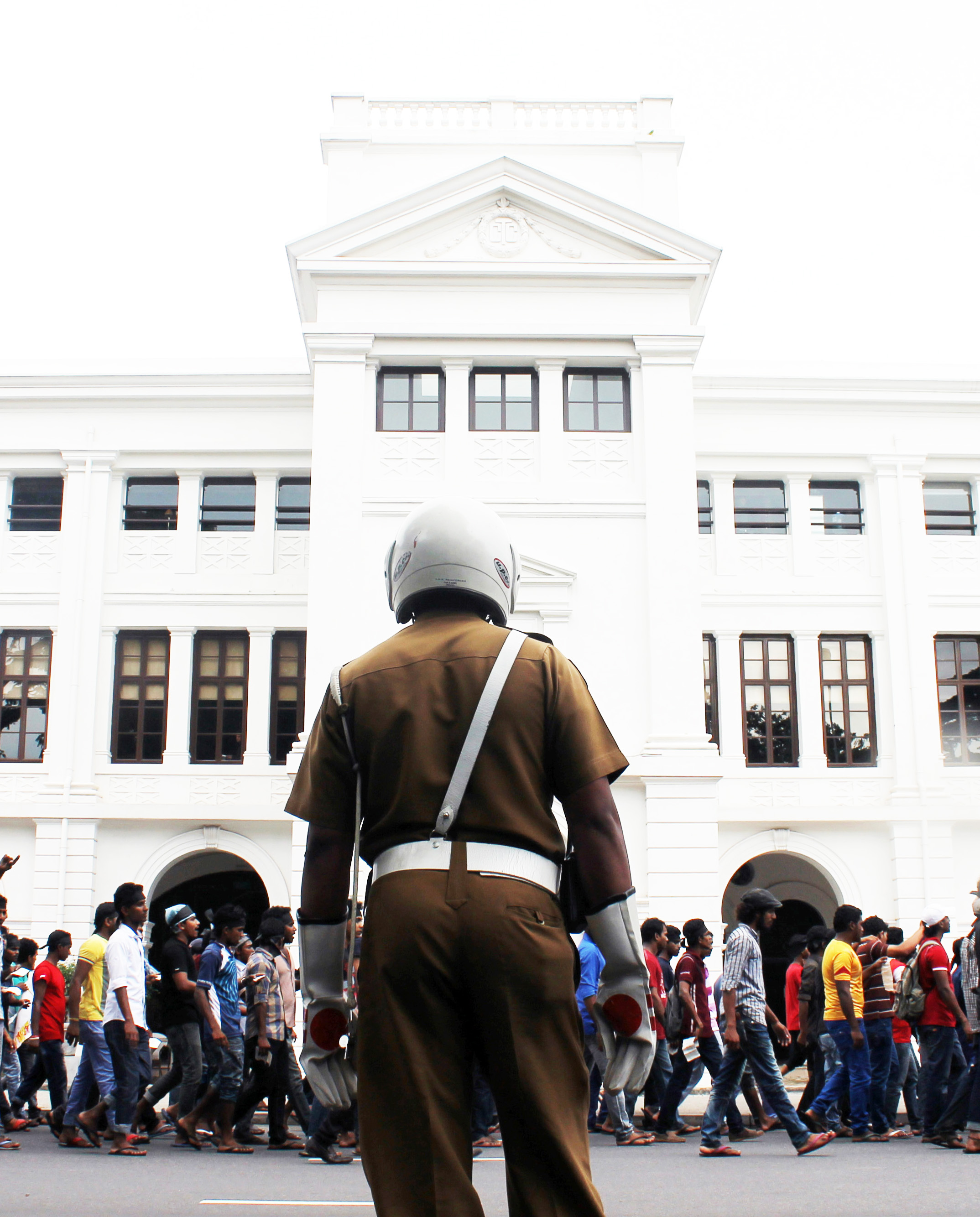
Standard traffic police uniform

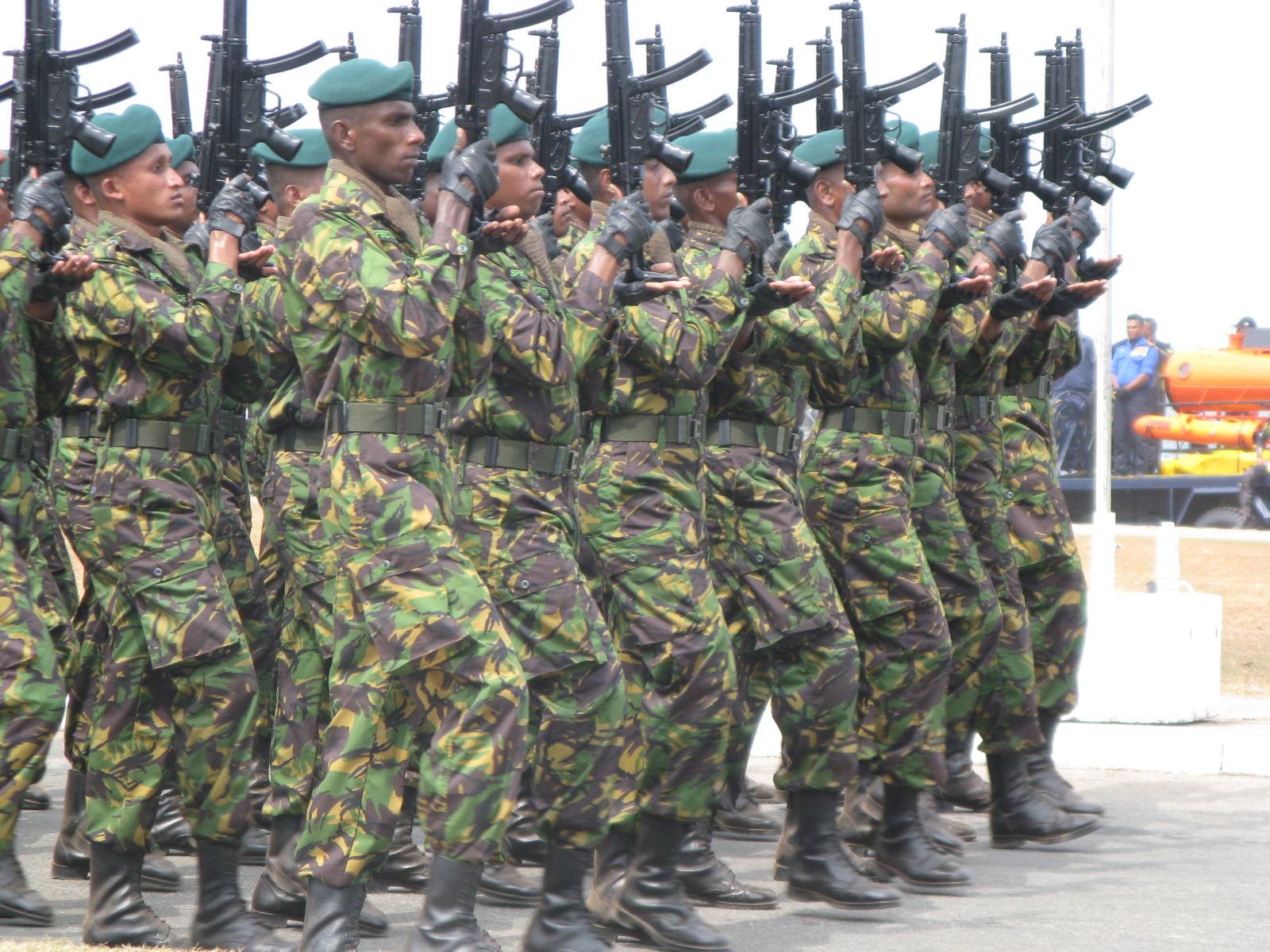
Special Task Force personnel in DPM camouflage and armed with MP5s during a parade in 2012

The current standard uniform comes from the last major changes made in 1974. However, several additions have been made since then for practical reasons. The old white uniform still remain as the full-dress uniform of gazetted officers above the rank of sub inspector SI, only worn for ceremonial occasions and weddings. This includes white tunic, trousers (or skirt), and medals, and is adorned with black epaulettes with rank insignia, a black leather cross belt with the lion head badge with whistle and chain, police badge-affixed black leather pouch, sword, and a white pith helmet. Senior gazetted officers (of and above ranks of ASP) may wear a waist sash in gold colour instead of the cross belt. Mounted officers wear a red tunic for ceremonial occasions with a gold cross belt and a black custodian helmet. Gazetted officers above the rank of sub inspector (SI), carry swords, and constables carry lances with a police pennant.

The No.01 khaki uniform is worn for most formal occasions. This consists of a dark khaki jacket adorned with black epaulettes (Gazetted officers above the rank of sub inspector - SI), white shirt, black tie with dark khaki trousers or a skirt, black peaked cap and medals.

The No.02 khaki uniform is the normal working uniform of all police officers. It consists of a dark khaki shirt (long or short sleeved), dark khaki trousers or a skirt, black peaked cap, and medals ribbons. Gazetted officers of and above the grade of superintendent wear black "gorget patches" on all types of uniforms. Officers above the rank of sub inspector SI, tend to wear a short sleeve tunic like a "bush jacket" as part of their No.02 khaki uniform. Black sam browne belts are worn by Officers above the rank of sub inspector - SI, with traffic policemen wearing white peak caps and the white belt with sam browne belts on their khaki uniforms. Constables and sergeants wear their service numbers on their uniforms. For practical reasons overalls of green or black may be worn with boots when necessary.

Special Task Force personnel usually wear khaki uniforms which are slightly lighter in colour. They tend to wear DPM camouflage uniforms with boots and bright green berets.

== Awards and decorations ==
The Sri Lanka Police has its own awards and decorations that are awarded to its officers for services in the line of duty.

== Weapons ==
Sri Lanka Police officers normally don't carry weapons (but are advised to). The Special Task Force with its wide range of duties is equipped with a greater variety of firearms and a higher degree of firepower to carry out military type counter-terrorism operations.

Handguns

- Glock 17
- Beretta 92
- Glock 19
- Beretta M9
- Browning 9mm
- CZ 75
- CZ 85
- NP 22
- NP 34

Assault rifles

- Type 56 (Mark-1 & Mark-2)
- Type 81
- M4 Carbine
- M16 (A1 and A2 variants)
- SAR-80

Sub-machine guns

- H&K MP5
- Uzi
- Mini Uzi
- PM-63

Sniper rifles

- Heckler & Koch PSG1
- Sako TRG
- IMI Galil
- Accuracy International Arctic Warfare

Grenade launchers

- HK 69
- M203 underbarreled grenade launcher

== Vehicles ==
- Hyundai Elantra, Volkswagen, Mazda and Subaru patrol cars
- P2 armored cars
- Mitsubishi Galant cars
- Proton cars
- Mazda BT-50 pick-ups
- Tata Safari SUVs
- Kawasaki 750cc motorcycles
- Hero Honda 200cc motorcycles
- Tata Sumo SUVs
- Suzuki 500cc motorcycles
- Mahindra Scorpio SUVs
- Yamaha 600cc patrol bikes
- Bicycles

== Notable officers killed in the line of duty or assassinated ==
- SDIG T.N. De Silva - Senior DIG Colombo Range, killed by a LTTE suicide bomb attack on 18 December 1999
- DIG Bennet Perera - Director, Criminal Investigation Department (CID); shot dead on 1 May 1989 in Mount Lavinia; JVP suspected.
- SSP Ranwalage Sirimal Perera - Superintendent of Police; killed with president Premadasa by a LTTE suicide bomb attack on 1 May 1993
- DIG Terrence Perera - Director, Counter Subversive Division; shot dead on 12 December 1987 in Talangama; JVP suspected.
- DIG Upul Seneviratne - Director of Training, Special Task Force; killed in a roadside bombing on 7 August 2006, LTTE suspected
- DIG Charles Wijewardhana - Superintendent of Police, Jaffna; abducted and killed in Jaffna on 5 August 2005, LTTE suspected
- Constable Sabhan - The origin of the annual Police Day commemoration dates back to 21 March 1864, when Constable Sabhan died of gunshot injuries received during a police raid to apprehend the notorious bandit Utuwankande Sura Saradiel.

== See also ==
- Law enforcement in Sri Lanka
- Awards and decorations of the Sri Lanka Police
- Home Guard Service
- Department of Prisons
- List of Sri Lankan mobsters
- Vidane
- Police community support officer
