= Protective security unit =

A protective security unit typically provides policing, security, intelligence and bodyguard services for sovereigns and politicians.

The Republic of Ireland's national police and security service is the Garda Síochána.

The Royal Thai Police Special Branch Bureau (SBB) is responsible for providing security domestic VIP and from foreign nations.

The Singapore Police Force's Police Security Command is responsible for protecting Cabinet ministers and dignitaries from foreign nations.

== See also ==
- List of protective service agencies
