= List of Sri Lankan generals and brigadiers =

This list is for people who ranked General or Brigadier in the Sri Lanka Army. It is not complete - please add to it if you know of any omissions.

Hence, in the lists below:

- 5* = Field Marshal
- 4* = General
- 3* = Lieutenant General
- 2* = Major General
- 1* = Brigadier

== Field marshal ==
- Field Marshal Sarath Fonseka - on the retired list. Commander, Sri Lanka Army 2005-09.

== General ==
=== Regular Force ===
- General Deshamanya Sepala Attygalle - on the retired list. Commander, Sri Lanka Army 1967-77.
- General T. I. Weerathunga - on the retired list. Commander, Sri Lanka Army 1981-85.
- General Cyril Ranatunga - on the retired list. General Officer Commanding, Joint Operations Command 1985-88.
- General Deshamanya Denis Perera - on the retired list. Commander, Sri Lanka Army 1977-81.
- General Nalin Seneviratne - on the retied list. Commander, Sri Lanka Army 1985-88.
- General Hamilton Wanasinghe - on the retired list. Commander, Sri Lanka Army 1988-91.
- General Cecil Waidyaratne - on the retired list. Commander, Sri Lanka Army 1991-93.
- General G. H. de Silva - on the retired list. Commander, Sri Lanka Army 1994-96.
- General Rohan Daluwatte - on the retired list. Commander, Sri Lanka Army 1996-98.
- General Srilal Weerasooriya - on the retired list. Commander, Sri Lanka Army 1998-00.
- General L. P. Balagalle - on the retired list. Commander, Sri Lanka Army 2000-04.
- General Shantha Kottegoda - on the retired list. Commander, Sri Lanka Army 2004-05.
- General Jagath Jayasuriya - on the retired list. Commander, Sri Lanka Army 2009-13.
- General Daya Ratnayake - on the retired list. Commander, Sri Lanka Army 2013-15.
- General Crishantha de Silva - on the retired list. Commander, Sri Lanka Army 2015-17.
- General Mahesh Senanayake - on the retired list. Commander, Sri Lanka Army 2017-19.
- General Shavendra Silva - on the retired list. Commander, Sri Lanka Army 2019-22.
- General (retired as a Major General) Kamal Gunaratne - on the retired list. General Officer Commanding, 53 Division.
- General Vikum Liyanage, on the retied list. Commander, Sri Lanka Army 2022-24.

=== Generals of the Volunteer Force ===
Three former members of the volunteer force have been awarded the honorary rank of General of the Sri Lanka Army Volunteer Force.

- General Sir John Kotelawala — Former Prime Minister of Ceylon and Minister of Defense and External Affairs.
- General Ranjan Wijeratne — Former Minister of Foreign Affairs and State Minister for Defence.
- General Anuruddha Ratwatte — Former Minister of Power and Energy and Deputy Minister for Defence

== Lieutenant general ==
- Lieutenant General Denzil Kobbekaduwa †
- Lieutenant General Parami Kulatunga †
- Lieutenant General Nalin Angammana †
- Lieutenant General Henry Athukorale (Retired - Deceased)
- Lieutenant General Lasantha Rodrigo Commander, Sri Lanka Army, 2025–present

== Major general ==
=== 1950 - 1969 ===
- Major General Anton Muttukumaru (Retired - Deceased)
- Major General H. W. G. Wijeyekoon (Retired - Deceased)
- Major General Richard Udugama (Retired - Deceased)
- Major General Bertram Heyn (Retired - Deceased)

=== 1970 - 1999 ===
- Major General C. A. M. N. Silva (Retired - Deceased)
- Major General Jayantha de S. Jayaratne (Deceased)
- Major General C. H. Fernando (Retired - Deceased)
- Major General S. M. A. Jayawardena (Retired)
- Major General J. R. S. de Silva (Retired - Deceased)
- Major General Y. Balaretnarajah (Retired)
- Major General Larry Wijeratne †
- Major General Tilak Paranagama (Retired)
- Major General Lakshman Algama (Retired - Assassinated)
- Major General Vijaya Wimalaratne †
- Major General Lucky Wijayaratne †
- Major General Gemunu Kulatunge (Retired - Deceased)
- Major General Janaka Perera (Retired - Assassinated)
- Major General T. N. De Silva (Retired)
- Major General Dr. Chelliah Thurairaja (Retired)
- Major General Nihal Jayakody (Deceased)
- Major General Jayatissa Bandara Pagoda (Retired - Deceased )

=== 2000 - present ===
- Major General Percy Fernando †
- Major General Prasanna Chandrasekera (Retired)
- Major General D. S. K. Wijesooriya (Retired)
- Major General D. W. Hapuarachchi (Retired)
- Major General Jaliya Nammuni (Retired)
- Major General Ananda Weerasekara (Retired)
- Major General H. Somadasa Hapuarachchi (Retired-Deceased)
- Major General Daya Wijeyesinghe (Retired - Deceased)
- Major General D. R. Aruna B. Jayatilleke (Deceased)
- Major General W. A. Asoka De Silva (Retired)
- Major General Sanath Karunaratne (Retired)
- Major General Chandana Rajaguru (Retired)
- Major General E. H. Samaratunga (Retired)
- Major General Bathiya Daulagala (Retired)
- Major General G.V.D. Udaya Perera (Retired)
- Major General Tuan Fadyl Meedin (Retired)
- Major General Lalith Daulagala (Retired)
- Major General L. L. A. Fernando (Retired)
- Major General Ranjith de Silva (Retired)
- Major General Sumith Balasuriya (Retired)
- Major General G S Padumadasa (Retired)
- Major General MHP Mihindukulasuriya(Retired)
- Major General Kumudu Perera (Retired)
- Major General Chagi Gallage (Retired)
- Major General Laksiri A. D. Amaratunge (Retired)
- Major General K. A. M. G. Kularatne (Retired - Deceased)
- Major General Jayanath C. P. Lokuketagodage (Retired)
- Major General Parakrama Pannipitiya (Retired)
- Major General Athula Jayawardane (Retired)
- Major General Nandana Udawatta (Retired)
- Major General D. Kalupahana (Retired)
- Major General Udaya Nanayakkara (Retired)
- Major General G. L. Sigera (Retired -Deceased)
- Major General Susantha Mendis †
- Major General Ananda Hamangoda †
- Major General Saliya Kulatunge (Retired - Deceased)
- Major General Lalith Wijetunge (Retired)
- Major General Janaka Walgama
- Major General Nirmal Dharmaratne
- Major General Ravi Ratnasingam
- Major General Sumedha Perera (Retired)
- Major General Lalith Abeywardena (Retired)
- Major General Nandana Senadeera
- Major General Ashok Weerasinghe (Retired)
- Major General S. M. Asoka Jayawardena (Retired)
- Major General Kamal Fernando (Retired - Deceased)
- Major General P. M. R. Bandara (Retired)
- Major General Samantha Sooriyabandara (Retired - Deceased)
- Major General Jagath Dias (Retired)
- Major General Athula Galagamage (Retired)
- Major General Prasanna de Silva (Retired)
- Major General Laksiri Waduge (Retired
- Major General Dammi Hewage
- Major General Duleep Wickremanayake (Retired)
- Major General M. K. D. Perera
- Major General Kithsiri Malporu (Retired)
- Major General Rasika Fernando
- Major General Jagath Gunawardena
- Major General W. L. P. W. Perera
- Major General Subashana Welikala (Deceased)
- Major General KAP Jagath Ratnayake
- Major General Priyanka Fernando
- Major General K.P.Nugegoda (Retired)
- Major General K.A.D.Sanath L.Perera (Retired)
- Major General Aruna Jayasekara (Retired)
- Major General A.K. Sooriyabandara
- Major General Lohan Gunawardena
- Major General Anton Wijendra
- Major General M.A. Muthalib
- Major General K.B. Egodawala
- Major General S.T.T. Jayasundera
- Major General K. Bohran
- Major General Sunil Tennekoon
- Major General S. Seniveratne
- Major General Chula Senivaratne
- Major General Sarath Munasinghe
- Major General Udena Gunawardana
- Major General K.A.M.G. Gunaratne
- Major General P.A. Karunathilleke
- Major General A.M.U.Seneviratne
- Major General Gemunu Kulathunga
- Major General Jayantha Ranaweera
- Major General Hema Thibbutumunuwe
- Major General Nimal Krishnaratne
- Major General Lal Fernando
- Major General Seevali Wanigasekara
- Major General Gamini Jayasundara
- Major General Priyantha Samaratunga
- Major General M.A. Muthalib
- Major General M.J.R.S Medagoda
- Major General A.M.C.P Wijayaratne
- Major General G.C.V.Fernando (Retired)

=== Volunteer Force ===
- Major General N. P. D. Palpola
- Major General S. V. Panabokke
- Major General S. A. Kulatunga
- Major General A. M. B. Aumunugama
- Major General W. A. D. S. Silva
- Major General W. B. Soyza
- Major General A. C. Obeysekara
- Major General W. D. L. P. Wickramasinghe
- Major General W. H. D. Mahanada
- Major General L. F. Kasthuriarachchi
- Major General K. P. Nugegoda
- Major General J. D. C. G. Jayasinghe
- Major General S. N. Samarawickrama
- Major General W. M. D. S. K. Gunawardhana

== Brigadier ==
=== 1950 - 1969 ===
- Brigadier Herbert Clifford Serasinghe (Retired - Deceased)

=== 1970 - 1999 ===
- Brigadier P. D. Ramayanayake (Retired - Deceased)
- Brigadier M. A. Jayaweera (Retired - Deceased)
- Brigadier E. T. De Z Abeysekera (Retired - Deceased)
- Brigadier Leonard Merlyn Wickramasuriya (Retired - Deceased)
- Brigadier T. S. B. Sally (Retired - Deceased)
- Brigadier S. B. Miyanadeniya (Retired - Deceased)
- Brigadier J. G. Balthazar (Retired - Deceased)
- Brigadier Ariyasinghe Ariyapperuma †
- Brigadier H F Rupasinghe (Retired - Deceased)
- Brigadier B. K. V. J. E. Rodrigo (Retired - Deceased)
- Brigadier Dennis Hapugalle (Retired - Deceased)
- Brigadier G. R. Jayasinghe (Retired)
- Brigadier Donald Hewagama (Retired)
- Brigadier Nimal Fernando (Retired)
- Brigadier R. T. Tambiah (Retired - Deceased)
- Brigadier K. Senarathna (Retired - Deceased)

=== 2000 - present ===
- Brigadier C.S.D. Gunasinghe
- Brigadier Bhathiya Jayatilleka †
- Brigadier Rohitha Neil Akmeemana †
- Brigadier S.B. Miyanadeniya
- Brigadier S.A.M.T. Seneviratne (Deceased)
- Brigadier M. H. Gunaratne
- Brigadier R. M. Jayasinghe
- Brigadier Nihal Hapuarachchi
- Brigadier Parry Liyanage
- Brigadier Udaya Ariyarathna
- Brigadier Gamini Angammana
- Brigadier Sarath Embawa
- Brigadier D.N. Wijesuriya (Retired - Deceased)
- Brigadier J. S. U. Katugampola
- Brigadier Sudantha Thilakarathne
- Brigadier Sanjaya Wanasinghe
- Brigadier D H M R B Tammita
- Brigadier P.N Liyanage (Retired - Deceased)

=== 1950 - 1969 ===
- Brigadier Christopher Allan Hector Perera Jayawardena (Retired - Deceased)

=== 1970 - 1969 ===
- Brigadier W. O. C. De Alwis (Retired - Deceased)

=== 1980 - 1989 ===
- Brigadier C. N. Panabokke (Retired - Deceased)
