= Hugh Fred Rupasinghe =

Sri Lanka Army general

Brigadier H. F. Rupasinghe VSV
- Military career
- Allegiance: Sri Lanka
- Branch: Sri Lanka Army
- Service years: 1958–1995
- Rank: Brigadier
- Service number: O/50242
- Unit: Sri Lanka Artillery
- Commands: Commander Security Forces Headquarters - Jaffna (SF HQ (J))
- Conflicts: 1971 Insurrection, Sri Lankan Civil War; Insurrection 1987-89
- Awards: Vishista Seva Vibhushanaya

Brigadier Hugh Fred Rupasinghe, VSV (12 June 1931 – 11 May 2019) was a senior Sri Lanka Army officer, who was the former Commander Security Forces Headquarters - Jaffna (SF HQ (J)).

Educated at St. Joseph's College, Colombo, he entered the Ceylon Law College. While studying law, he enlisted and was commissioned in the Ceylon Army on 17 May 1958. On completing the first young officer course at the Army Training Centre along with Ariyasinghe Ariyapperuma, he was posted to the 1st Field Artillery Regiment, Ceylon Artillery as a second lieutenant where he served as an artillery officer, gaining promotion to the ranks of lieutenant in September 1959, captain in December 1962 and major in August 1969. He was transferred to the 4th Field Regiment following its formation after the reforms that let to the disbandment of all other artillery regiments following the 1962 coup attempt. He followed Advance Gunnery course at the Indian Army School of Artillery. Rupasinghe, carry out extra-regimental duties as Officer Instructor, Army Training Center, Diyatalawa; Staff officer 3, Admin branch, Army Headquarters; Staff officer 2, Headquarters Support Group, Panagoda Cantonment and Officer for Recruiting Amateurs, Army Headquarters.

Promoted to the rank of lieutenant colonel in May 1979, he served as the staff officer 1, Personal administration branch, Army Headquarters and commanded his parent regiment, as commanding officer of the 4th Field Regiment, Sri Lanka Artillery from January 1982 to September 1983. He attended the Senior Command courese at the College of Combat, Mhow. Promoted to the ranks of colonel in January 1984 and brigadier in January 1986, he went on to serve as the commander, Security Forces Headquarters – Jaffna; commander, Security Forces Headquarters – Central, commander (coordinating), Administrative District - Jaffna and in the Joint Operations Command. He was transferred to the Sri Lanka Army Volunteer Force in June 1986 and retired on 31 March 1995. When there were shortages of artillery ammunition, Brigadier Rupasinghe developed the use of dropping 4.2-inch mortar booms from helicopters using a locally made launcher. Troops referred to these as "Rupasinghe Mortars".

He was awarded the Vishista Seva Vibhushanaya (VSV) for distinguished service in 1986. His other medals include the Republic of Sri Lanka Armed Services Medal, Sri Lanka Army 25th Anniversary Medal, Ceylon Armed Services Long Service Medal, Sri Lanka Armed Services Long Service Medal and the President's Inauguration Medal.

Military offices
Preceded by Colonel C J Abeyratn	Commander Security Forces Headquarters - Jaffna; 1986	Succeeded by Brigadier G. H. De Silva
