= Sri Lanka Armoured Corps =

- Active: 1955 - present
- Country: Sri Lanka
- Branch: Sri Lanka Army
- Type: Armoured corps
- Role: Tank warfare Armoured warfare
- Size: 5 regular regiments, 1 volunteer regiment
- Regimental Headquarters: Rock House Army Camp
- Motto: Whither the fates call
- March: Quick - The Radetski March (traditional); Under the Double Eagle (modern); Slow - 1st Dragoon Guards and 2nd Dragoon Guards Slow March
- Engagements: 1971 Insurrection; Insurrection 1987-89; Sri Lankan Civil War

Commanders
- Colonel Commandant: Maj Gen P R Pathiravithana USAWC psc
- Commander Armoured Brigade: Brig B Y Nanayakkara RSP psc
- Centre Commandant: Brig S J Samarasinghe psc

Insignia
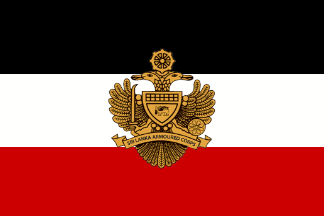
- Flag

The Sri Lanka Armoured Corps (SLAC) provides the armour capability of the Sri Lanka Army, with vehicles such as the T-55AM2 main battle tank; the BMP infantry fighting vehicle; and the BTR-80 and WZ551 armoured personnel carriers. It comprises five regular armoured regiments, a volunteer regiment, and a regimental band. It has an independent Armoured Brigade and is headquartered at Rock House Army Camp, Colombo.

== History ==
=== Formation ===
The Ceylon Army was established in 1949. Under Prime Minister Colonel Sir John Kotelawala, the Government of Ceylon decided on the need to add armour to support infantry elements of the newly established regular army. To this effect a cavalry arm was considered and the 1st Reconnaissance Squadron was established on 1 October 1955 under the command of Major D. S. Attygalle at the Echelon Barracks. Squadron moved to Ridiyagama for training with British Army advisers from the Queen's Dragoons Guards received four British Ferret unturreted scout cars along with twenty BSA M20 with side cars that were armed with Bren light machine gun. The squadron expanded its number of personal and increased its training. In 1957, the squadron moved to Ampara on flood relief duties and in December moved to Rock House Army Camp in Colombo, which became its regimental headquarters. In 1958, the squadron was deployed to counter the communal riots and on 15 December 1958 it was expanded to a formation reconnaissance regiment with two recce squadrons and had increased its fleet with BSA M21 motorcycles, eight Ferret Mk II Scout Cars and two Daimler Armoured Cars. The 1st Reconnaissance Regiment became allied to and inherited the traditions of Queen's Dragoons Guards and it became the Ceylon Armoured Corps.

=== 1971 Insurrection ===
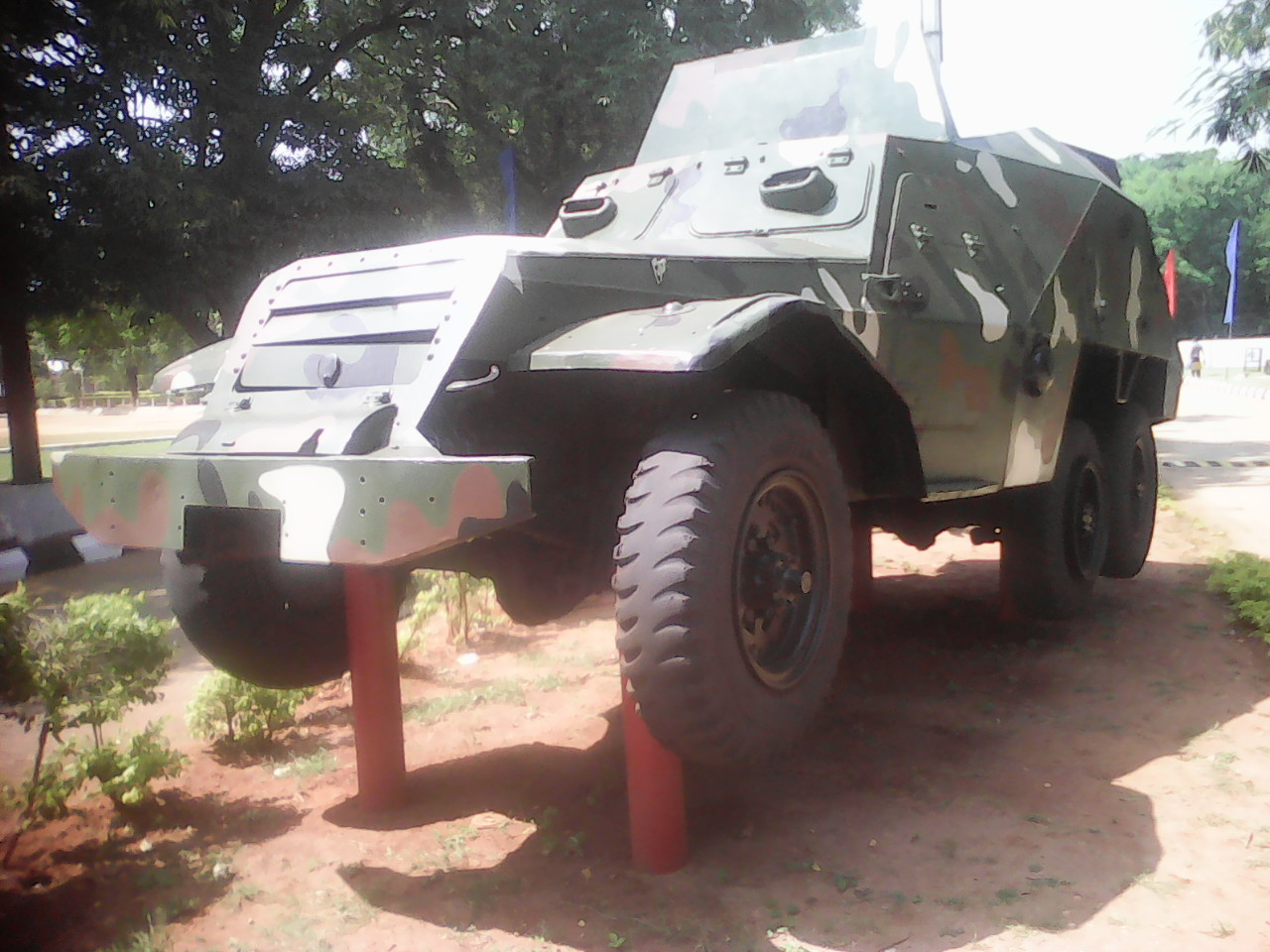
SLAC retired BTR-152.

The 1st Recce Regiment was deployed on several occasions in the 1950s and 1960s on flood relief and internal security operations. It was deployed for counter-insurgency operations in Kurunegala and Anuradhapura districts under the command of Lieutenant Colonel Cyril Ranatunga during the 1971 Insurrection against the JVP. In 1971, the regiment received twelve British Alvis Saladin armoured cars in May and ten Soviet BTR-152 armoured personnel carriers (APCs) in November to supplement its counter-insurgency operations with a third squadron. When Sri Lanka became a republic in 1972, the CAC became the Sri Lanka Armoured Corps. Following the insurrection, the regiment deployed a saber squadron to provide security for the Criminal Justice Commission from 1973 to 1976. A forth squadron was raised in 1974.

The first volunteer (reserve) unit of the SLAC, the 2nd (Volunteer) Regiment, Sri Lanka Armoured Corps was formed in 1979 under the command of Lt. Col Eustace Jayasekara with troops from the Ceylon National Guard.

=== Civil War ===
SLAC armour in a combat operation.

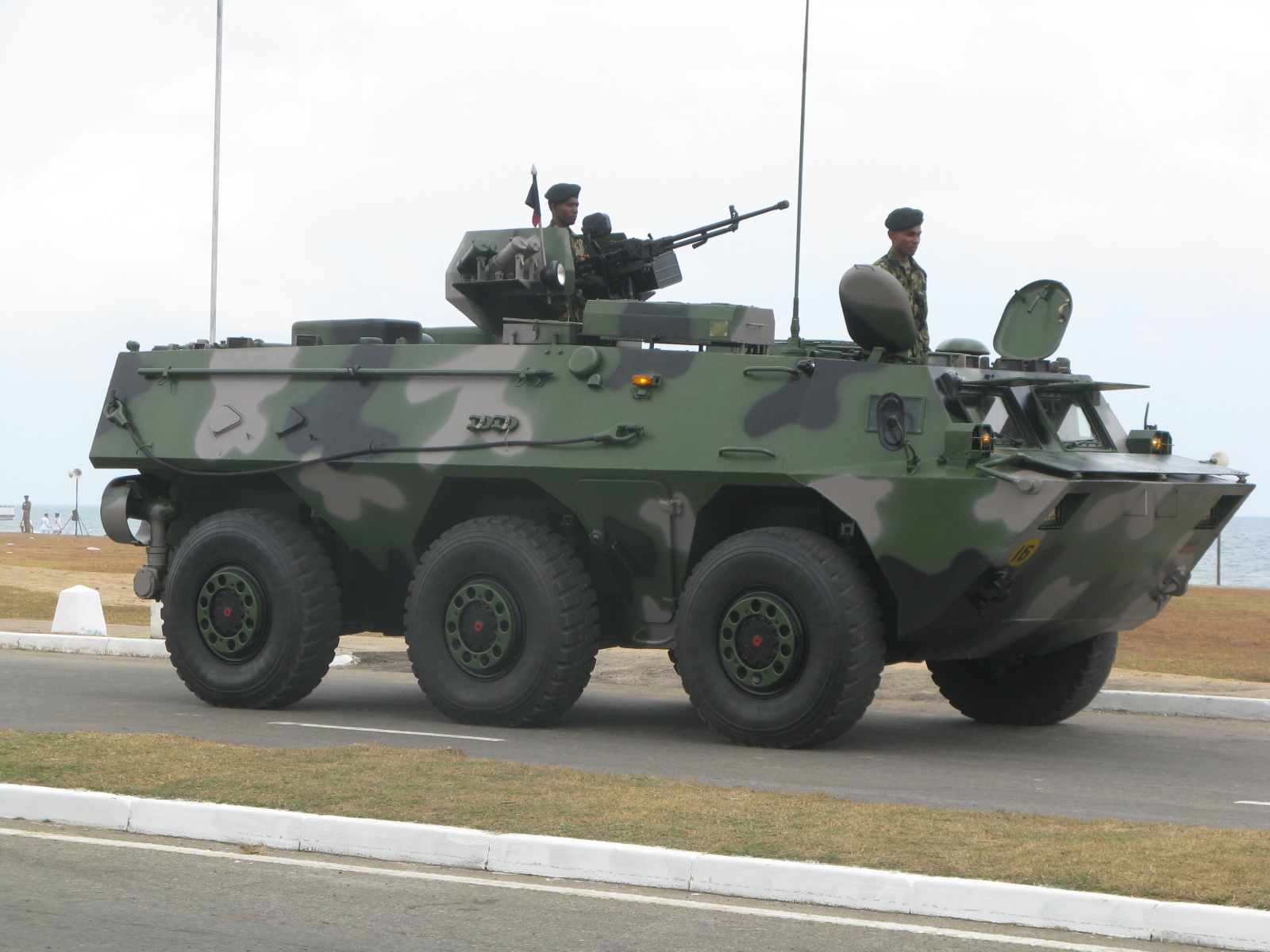
Sri Lanka Army WZ551 APC

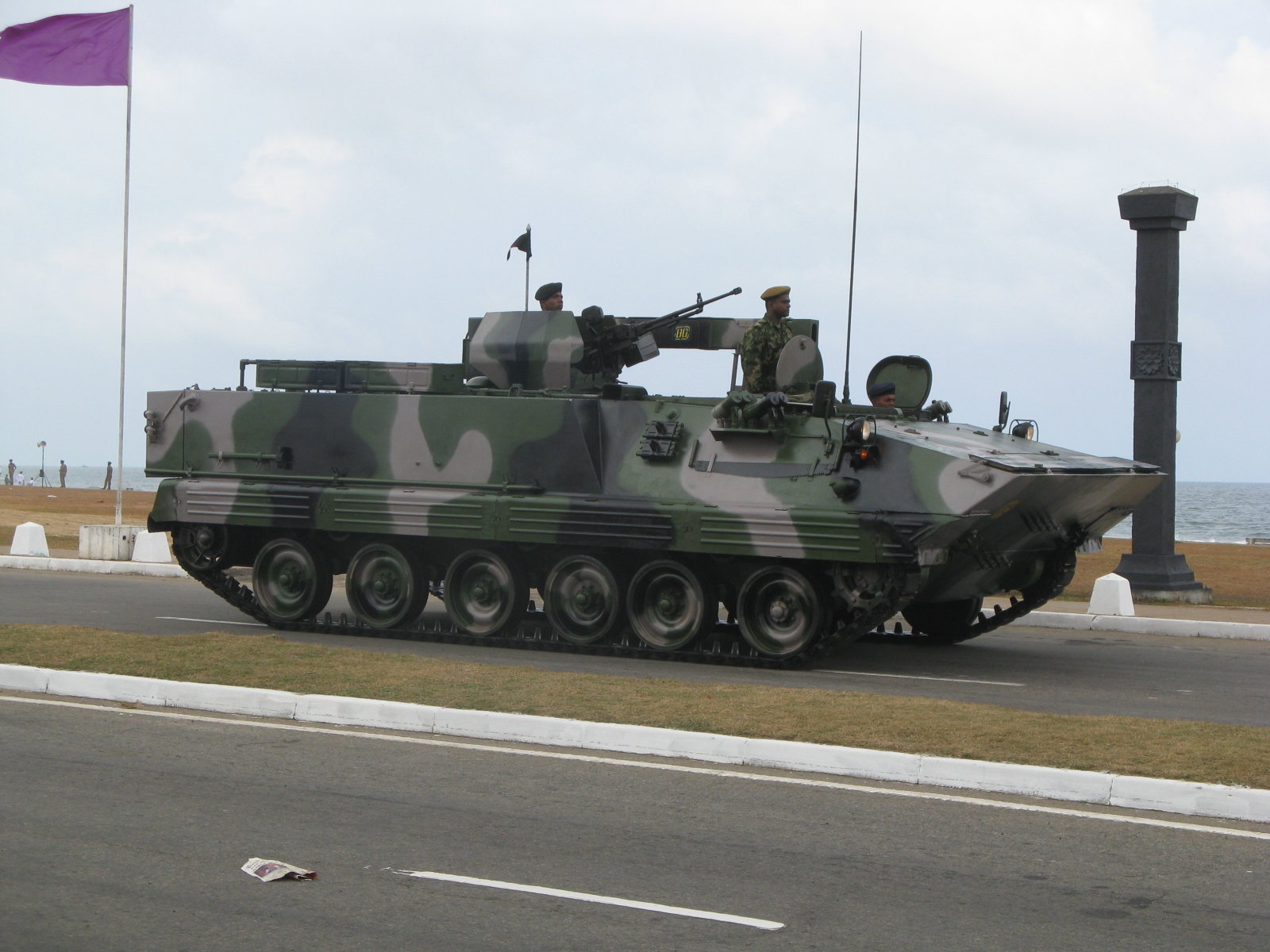
Type 89 (YW534) Armoured Fighting Vehicles

With the escalation of the Sri Lankan civil war, three saber squadrons were deployed in the northern and eastern provinces of the country, to provide fire support for infantry and for the protection of road convoys. The forth squadron was deployed in Colombo for the defense of the capital. The Armoured Corps Training Centre (ACTC) was established on 1 January 1984 at Kalattewa, Anuradhapura. The regiment received several Alvis Stalwart amphibious vehicles in 1985 and thirty two Alvis Saracen APCs in 1986. With the Saracens the SLAC was able to allocate two Saracens per troop providing assault troops to provide close combat support in the form of mechanized infantry. In the 1980s the regiment supported all major military operations, notably Vadamarachchi Operation. Following the deployment of the Indian Peace Keeping Force in the North and East provinces, the regiment deployed a saber squadron each in Jaffna and Kilinochchi, while it deployed the remaining two squadrons in Colombo and Gampaha as the 1987–1989 JVP insurrection started in the south of the island. In November 1988, the 3rd Reconnaissance Regiment was raised with Saladins, Saracens, Ferrets and a Stalwart. On 15 December 1988, the Armoured Brigade was formed under the command of Brigadier Y. Balaretnarajah who became the first Armoured Brigade Commander bring under it the 1st, 3rd Reconnaissance Regiments and the ACTC. Its expansion was limited since the Government of Sri Lanka face difficulties in precuring spares and new military equipment from its traditional suppliers in the United Kingdom and Singapore due to pressure from Western countries. The US government approved the sale of Cadillac Gage armoured cars without turrets and guns and the British government's refusal to supply spare parts for the Alvis Saladins and Ferret armoured cars. The SLAC received 10 Type 63 (YW531) APC from China in 1988. The 2nd (Volunteer) Regiment was transferred to the Sri Lanka Light Infantry as its 5th (Volunteer) battalion in 1989.

Three saber squadrons from the two regiments were deployed for the first amphibious landings made by the army in Operation Balavegaya to break the siege on Elephant Pass. The siege on Elephant Pass made it clear that the civil war had shifted from an insurrection into a conventional war. The army looked for new sources of heavier weaponry and found it in China and Czechoslovakia. It looked for tracked vehicles for better cross country movements and larger caliber guns. In 1991, Sri Lanka Armoured Corps received from China twenty Type 85 light tanks, ten Type 90 APCs, command vehicles and a Type 86 armoured recovery vehicle which were assigned to the 3rd Reconnaissance Regiment replacing the British armoured cars. That year the SLAC introduced main battle tanks with the formation of its first tank regiment, the 4th Armoured Regiment at Clappenburg in Trincomalee equipped with T-55A medium tanks and T 55 ARVs brought down from the Czechoslovakia. In 1992, SLAC deployed twenty Type 86 infantry fighting vehicles. The two T-55A tanks of the 4th Armoured Regiment captured by the LTTE in the Battle of Pooneryn in November 1993. One of these destroyed by the air force and the other was re-captured at the end of the war.

The 5th Regiment raised in 1994 as an infantry role and converted to an armoured role as the 5th Reconnaissance Regiment with the arrival of Russian sixteen BMP-1 IFVs, followed by Chinese thirty Type 63 II APCs and a Czech T 54 AVLB bridge-layer. Many of the SLAC units deployed in the Operation Riviresa in 1995 and became the first units enter Jaffna. The 6th Regiment was raised in January 1997 and was initially deployed in an infantry role. In 1998, thirty three BTR-80 APCs and BTR-80 A IFVs were added to the 'A' vehicle fleet shared between the 1st, 3rd, 6th recce regiments and were used in Operation Jayasikurui. In May 1998, the 7th Battalion, Sri Lanka National Guard was transferred as the SLAC as the 7th (Volunteer) Regiment in an infantry role. In 1999, the 8th Regiment was raised as a reinforcement regiment in an infantry role. In 1998 the SLAC was presented with the President's Standard in recognition of the service it has rendered.

In 2000, Czech T-55 AM II MBTs, BMP-2, BMP-3 IFVs were added followed by the BMP-2 command vehicles in 2002. The regiments underwent reorganizing with new equipment, the 4th Armoured Regiment was reorganized in 2001 with three squadrons of T-55 AM II; 3rd Reconnaissance Regiment received one squadron of T-55A and the 1st Reconnaissance Regiment phased out its old British AFVs and was fully equipped with BTR 80s and BTR 80A.

With the hostilities resuming in 2006, SLAC units deployed in offensive operations on all fronts. Its 4th Armoured Regiment lost six tanks in the key Battle of Jaffna. The 6th recce regiment was disbanded in February 2007 with its personal and equipment transferred to the newly formed Mechanized Infantry Regiment. In August 2007 a new 6th Reinforcement Regiment was raised followed by the 10th Reinforcement Regiment was raised in August 2008. In 2009 more Chinese WZ551 APCs were added and the 3rd Reconnaissance Regiment was re-designated as the 3rd Armoured Regiment as it was converted to a tank regiment. The army was negotiating the purchase of twenty Al Khalids from Pakistan when the war ended. Following end of the war, the 9th and 10th reinforcement regiments were disbanded and amalgamated with the 8th regiment in 2012.

== Units ==
=== Operations and administration ===
- Armoured Brigade
- Regimental Centre
- SLAC regimental band

=== Regular Army ===
- 1st Reconnaissance Regiment SLAC
- 3rd Armoured Regiment SLAC (Formed on 16 November 1988 at Rock House Camp, Colombo)
- 4th Armoured Regiment SLAC (Formed on 24 September 1991 at Rock House camp, first ever Tank Regiment of SLA)
- 5th Reconnaissance Regiment SLAC (Formed on 6 January 1994 at Rock House Camp)
- 6th (RFT) Regiment SLAC
- 8th (RFT) Regiment SLAC (Disbanded) (Formed on 30 July 1998 at Vasavilan)
- 9th (RFT) Regiment SLAC (Disbanded) (Formed on 21 January 2008 and disbanded on 1 April 2012)
- 10th (RFT) Regiment SLAC (Disbanded) (Formed on 28 August 2008 and disbanded on 1 April 2012)

=== Volunteer Force ===
- 2nd(V) Regiment SLAC (Formed on 1 January 1979 and disbanded on 15 August 1987 to form 5 (V) Sri Lanka Light Infantry)
- 7th(V) Regiment SLAC (Converted from 7 Sri Lanka National Guard on 22 May 1998)

=== Armoured Corps Training Centre ===
The Armoured Corps Training Centre (ACTC) was established in 1984 at the army camp at Kalattewa, Anuradhapura to train tradesmen needed to operate its fleet of AFV.

Its programs includes;

- Young officers course
- Recruit training course
- Tank commanders/ Troop sergeants course
- Basic tank drivers course
- B Vehicle course
- Gunner operators course
- Clerks course
- NCOs leadership course
- BTR drivers course
- Logistic course
- MT Document course
- Cpl to Sgt promotion course
- T 55 Tank Driver intensive course
- T 55 Tank Gnr/Opr intensive course
- Class 1 diver course
- Class 1 operator course

== Equipment ==
Main battle tanks

- T-55AM2

Light tanks

- Type 85 light tank

Armoured recovery vehicles

- VT-55 Armoured recovery vehicle
- BMP-MTP Armoured recovery vehicle
- BREM-K Armoured recovery vehicle

Armoured vehicle-launched bridges

- MT-55A Armoured vehicle-launched bridge

Infantry fighting vehicles

- BMP-3 Infantry fighting vehicle
- BMP-2 Infantry fighting vehicle
- BMP-1 Infantry fighting vehicle
- Type 89 Armoured fighting vehicle
- Type 86 (WZ501) Armoured fighting vehicles
- Type 85 Armoured fighting vehicle

Armoured cars

- Alvis Saladin (in reserve storage)
- Daimler Armoured Cars (retired)
- Ferret armoured cars (retired)

Armoured personnel carriers

- BTR-80 Armoured personnel carrier
- Type 90/92 Armoured personnel carrier
- Type 63 (YW531) Armoured personnel carriers
- BTR-152 Armoured personnel carrier (retired)
- Alvis Saracen (retired)

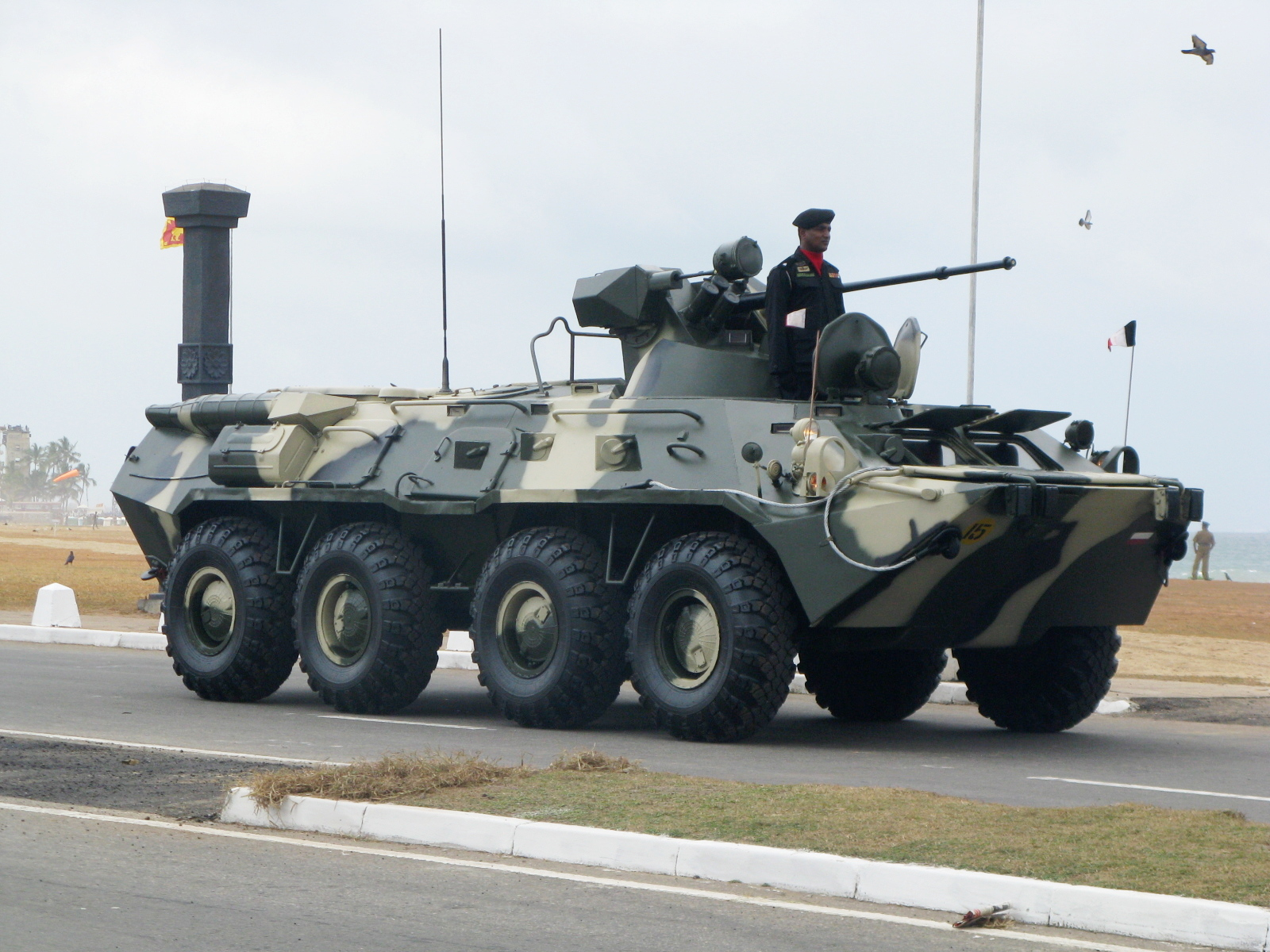
Sri Lanka Army BTR80A

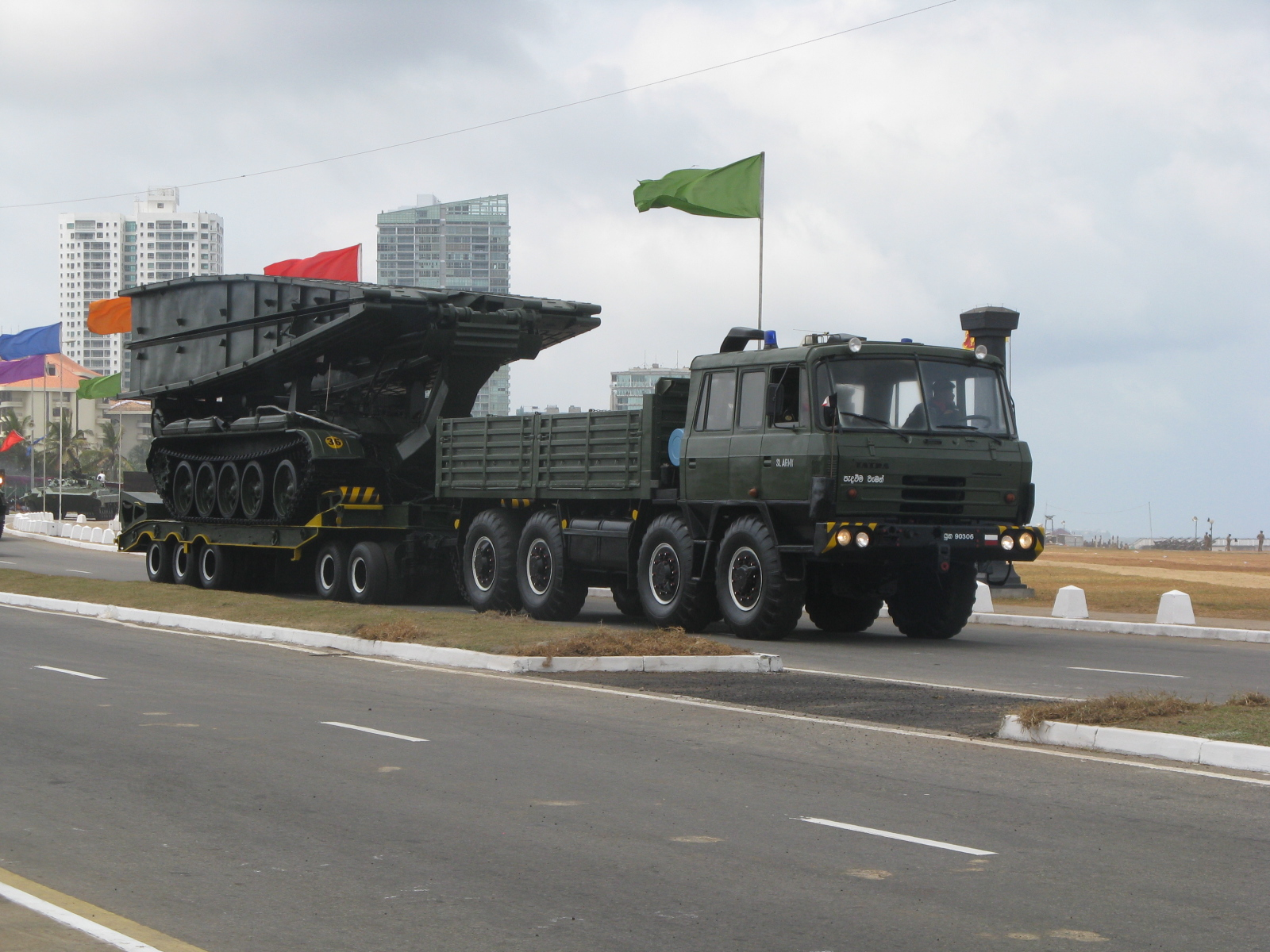
Sri Lanka Army MT-55A Armoured Vehicle-launched Bridge pulled by Tatra T815 Truck

== Notable members ==
- General Deshamanya D. S. Attygalle, LVO, SLAC - former Commander of the Army, Permanent Secretary of the Ministry of Defence and father of the Sri Lanka Armoured Corps
- General Cyril Ranatunga, VSV, SLAC - former GOC, Joint Operations Command and Permanent Secretary of the Ministry of Defence
- General Jagath Jayasuriya, VSV, USP, psc, SLAC - former Chief of the Defence Staff and Commander of the Army
- General Rohan Daluwatte, RWP, RSP, VSV, USP, SLAC - Former Commander of the Army.
- General Cecil Waidyaratne, VSV, USP, ndc, psc SLAC - Former Commander of the Army.
- Lieutenant General Denzil Kobbekaduwa RWP, RSP, VSV, USP, rcds, psc, SLAC † - Former General Officer Commanding Northern Sector & one of the greatest generals in modern Sri Lanka.
- Major General Y. Balaretnarajah, VSV, USP, ndc, SLAC- Former Chief of Staff of the Army, Commandant Sri Lanka Army Volunteer Force, GOC, 1 Division and Commander, Security Forces, Jaffna.
- Major General DVSY Kulathunge USP, RSP, ndc, psc, SLAC- Former Chief of Staff of the Army and Cammandant Sri Lanka Army Volunteer Force.
- Major General G.A Chandrasiri RWP, USP, mdc, psc SLAC- Former Chief of Staff of the Army and Commander, Northern Command.
- Major General C.H. Fernando, VSV, SLAC - former Director Operations, General Staff; GOC, 2 Division; Commandant, Army Training Centre; Commander, Northern Command.
- Major General T Paranagama VSV, USP, SLAC - Former GOC, 1 Division, GOC, 3 Division; and Commander Security Forces Headquarters - Wanni (SF HQ (W)),
- Major General T. N. De Silva, USP, psc, SLAC - former Commandant, Sri Lanka Army Volunteer Force; GOC, 21 Division, Brigade Commander Armoured Brigade and Director, National Cadet Corps.
- Major General P.A Karunatilleke RWP- Former Deputy Overall Operations Commander and Commander Northern Command.
- Major General D. Kalupahana, RSP, USP, psc, SLAC - former GOC, 3 Division; GOC, 2 Division; Director Operations, General Staff and Commandant, Sri Lanka Military Academy.
- Major General N.A.Ranasinghe, RSP, VSV, USP, ndc, psc, Isc, SLAC - Former General Officer Commanding (GOC) 56 Division; Director Operations and Plans at the Joint Operations Headquarters, Commandant, Sri Lanka Military Academy, Commandant, Army Command and Staff College, Commandant, Defence Services Command and Staff College, First Commanding Officer of 5th Regiment, Sri Lanka Armoured Corps.
- Major General Nandana Udawatta, RSP, USP, SLAC - former Security Forces Headquarters – Mullaitivu (SFHQ-MLT) and former GOC, 59 Division
- Major General Milinda Peiris, RWP, RSP, USP, ndc, psc - Vice Chancellor of the General Sir John Kotelawala Defence University (KDU).
- Major General Ubaya Madawela, USP, psc - Security Force Commander (West) and former Military Spokesman
- Brigadier Dennis Hapugalle, VSV, psc, SLAC - former Chief of Civil Defence and Permanent Secretary, Ministry of Internal Security.
- Brigadier M. H. Gunaratne, VSV, psc, SLAC - former Commander Security Forces Headquarters - East (SF HQ (E)), Commander, Task Force I and Task Force III and Commandant, Army Training Centre
- Brigadier R. M. Jayasinghe, USP, psc, SLAC - former Director Armour; brigade commander, armoured brigade; brigade commander, 212 Brigade and the first Military attaché, Sri Lankan Embassy, Washington DC.

== Order of precedence ==
Preceded by First in Order of Precedence	Order of Precedence	Succeeded by Sri Lanka Artillery
Preceded by First in Order of Precedence	Order of Precedence (with armoured vehicles)	Succeeded by Mechanized Infantry Regiment

== See also ==
Sri Lanka Army

== External links and sources ==
- Sri Lanka Army
- Sri Lanka Armoured Corps
