= M. H. Gunaratne =

- Military career
- Branch: Sri Lankan Army
- Service years: 1957-1990
- Rank: Major General
- Unit: SLAC
- Commands: Commander Security Forces Headquarters - East
- Conflicts: Sri Lankan Civil War, Insurrection 1987-89
- Awards: Vishista Seva Vibhushanaya
- Other work: Chairman of the State Timber Corporation

Brigadier M. H. Gunaratne, VSV, psc, SLAC (1930 - ) was a Sri Lankan military officer, former Commander Security Forces Headquarters - East (SF HQ (E)), Commander, Task Force I and Task Force III and Commandant, Army Training Centre

Educated at St Peter's College, Colombo, Royal College, Colombo and graduated from the University of Ceylon. Gunaratne joined the army was commissioned into the Sri Lanka Armoured Corps in 1957 as a Second Lieutenant.

Serving with the 1st Reconnaissance Regiment as a Troop Leader he went on the serve as a Military Liaison Officer of the Ministry of External Affairs and Defence. Later he became the commanding officer of the 4 (V) Design Ceylon Engineers; Army units in Mannar; Echelon Barracks; Army units in Jaffna; Sri Lanka Army Pioneer Corps and the 1st Reconnaissance Regiment, Sri Lanka Armoured Corps.

Becoming the Deputy Commandant, Sri Lanka Army Volunteer Force, he was made the Commander, Task Force I (South) during the Insurrection 1987-89 and thereafter the Commander of Task Force III (North and North Central) with the escalation of the Sri Lankan Civil War.

He was appointed Commandant of the Army Training Centre, then Director, Budget and Financial Management and later Military Secretary at the Army Headquarters. Promoted to the rank of Brigadier he was appointed as Principal Staff Officer of the Joint Operations Command and thereafter Commander Security Forces Headquarters - East

Major General Gunaratne was a graduate of the Defence Services Staff College in India. He was awarded the service medals Vishista Seva Vibhushanaya (VSV), the Sri Lanka Armed Services Long Service Medal, Republic of Sri Lanka Armed Services Medal and the Ceylon Armed Services Long Service Medal.

After his retirement he became the Chairman of the State Timber Corporation.
