= Sepala Attygalle =

Sri Lankan army general, civil servant, and diplomat

General Deshamanya Don Sepala Attygalle සේපාල ආටිගල LVO
- Born: October 14, 1921
- Died: January 15, 2001 (aged 79); Colombo
- Military career
- Allegiance: Sri Lanka
- Branch: Ceylon Defence Force; Ceylon Army; Sri Lanka Army
- Service years: 1942–1946, 1949–1977
- Rank: General
- Service number: 0/50010
- Units: Ceylon Light Infantry; Sri Lanka Armoured Corps
- Commands: Commander of the Sri Lankan Army; Chief of Staff of the Sri Lankan Army
- Conflicts: World War II; First JVP Insurrection; Second JVP Insurrection; Sri Lankan Civil War
- Awards: Lieutenant of the Royal Victorian Order; War Medal 1939–1945
- Other work: Permanent Secretary Ministry of Defence, Sri Lankan High Commissioner to the United Kingdom

General Deshamanya Don Sepala Attygalle, LVO (14 October 1921 – 15 January 2001) was a Sri Lankan army officer, civil servant and diplomat. The longest serving Commander of the Sri Lankan Army (1967–1977), he went on to serve as the Permanent secretary to the Ministry of Defence and Sri Lankan High Commissioner to the United Kingdom.

He is most notable for successfully crushing the 1971 Insurrection in a matter of months and becoming the first Sri Lankan army officer to be promoted to the rank of full general. He is known as the "Father of the Armoured Corps" and was The Equerry to Queen Elizabeth II during her coronation in 1953.

== Early life and education ==
Attygalle was educated at the Royal College, Colombo, where he became the head prefect, won colours in both athletics and rugby; and was the Senior Sergeant of the Cadet Contingent of Royal College. Upon completing his schooling, he entered the University College, Colombo.

== Military career ==
=== Second World War ===
With the outbreak of World War II in 1940, Attygalle left his studies at the university college to join the Ceylon Defense Force with its wartime expansion and was commissioned as a second lieutenant in the Ceylon Light Infantry on 15 November 1940. He underwent basic officer training at Diyatalawa, where he took the sword of honour at the army passing out parade in 1941 and thereafter underwent advanced training in India. He was promoted to the temporary rank of Captain in 1943. He was demobilized 9 March 1946, and had been the Defence Services 100-metre Champion until 1944.

=== Government service ===
Following the end of the war, he joined the government service as the Assistant Controller of Textiles and thereafter served as the Assistant Controller of Exports and Imports.

=== Ceylon army ===
With the formation of the new Ceylon Army on 10 October 1949 following the passing of the Army Act; he was commissioned as a lieutenant in the 1 Battalion, Ceylon Light Infantry as a regular officer on 22 October 1949, promoted to the rank of captain on the same day, he was then assigned as the General Staff Officer - Grade 3 (GSO3) at the Army Headquarters, Ceylon. On 27 July 1950 he was appointed an Extra Aide-de-camp (ADC) to Lord Soulbury, the Governor General of Ceylon, succeeding Major Bevis Bawa. He was promoted to rank of major on 1 January 1952 and was appointed GSO2, Army Headquarters in February.

From May to July 1952, he attended the Company Commanders' Course at the School of Infantry, Warminster and the Land/Air Warfare Course at the School of Land/Air Warfare from October to November 1952. Thereafter he was attached to the 1st Battalion, King's Own Yorkshire Light Infantry, in Germany; serving with the NATO Forces in Europe. On his return he resumed his post as GSO2, Army Headquarters.

In January 1953, he relinquished his staff appointment at the army headquarters and left for the United Kingdom to attend the Staff College, Camberley. On 2 June 1953, he was appointed Equerry to HM Queen Elizabeth II at her coronation. On completing the staff college course, he was seconded to the 1st The Queen's Dragoon Guards. During this time he served as a military liaison officer (military attaché) to the High Commissioner for Ceylon in the United Kingdom. On his return he took part in the formation of the "D" Company, 1st Battalion, Ceylon Light Infantry of which was appointed officer commanding.

=== Ceylon Armoured Corps ===
In 1955, Major D.S. Attygalle was tasked with raising a reconnaissance unit and on 10 October 1955, he formed the 1st Reconnaissance (Recce) Squadron as the Cavalry Arm in the Ceylon Army in the lines of 1st The Queen's Dragoon Guards, with himself as officer commanding. On 17 December 1955 a Combined Services Buddhist Mission led by Major Attygalle left for Burma on board HMCyS Vijaya, to represent the Armed Forces of Ceylon at the Buddha Jayanthi commemoration celebrations, and present a gift of a Bodhi tree sapling. On 25 December 1955, he was appointed Officer Commanding Troops, Echelon Barracks, and served till 9 August 1956. On 1 October 1958, he was promoted to the rank lieutenant colonel and appointed the first commanding officer of the 1st Reconnaissance Regiment, with the expansion of the recce squadron to a full regiment. The 1st Reconnaissance Regiment became the core of the Ceylon Armoured Corps. He attended a training with the Royal Armoured Corps from March to April 1959. He held the post of the commanding officer, 1st Reconnaissance Regiment until March 1964.

=== TFAII and Chief of Staff ===
On 1 December 1962, he was promoted to the rank of colonel; he took up appointment as Commander, Army Force Panagoda, whilst serving as commanding officer, Ceylon Armoured Corps. In June 1963, he went on an official visit to Yugoslavia, where he underwent a guerilla warfare training course. Having relinquished his post of Commander, Army Force Panagoda on 13 August 1963, he was appointed Commander, Task Force Anti Illicit Immigration on 14 August 1963, later he also served as the Inspector of Training, Army Headquarters. He was then appointed Chief of Staff of the Army on 21 March 1964. He relinquished command of the Task Force Anti Illicit Immigration on 30 June 1965 and in 1966 he attended the Imperial Defence College. On his return he resumed duties as Chief of Staff.

=== Commander of the Army ===
He relinquished Chief of Staff duties and was promoted to the rank of Brigadier on 22 September 1967 and appointed Acting Commander of the Army after the retirement of Major General B.R. Heyn. On 1 October 1967, Attygalle was promoted to the rank of Major General and confirmed as Commander of the Army. Under his leadership, the army crushed the 1971 Insurrection within two months, and he was promoted to the rank of lieutenant general on 4 April 1974, thus being the first officer of the Sri Lanka Army to hold this rank. On the day of his retirement, on 13 October 1977, after having served for ten years as commander, he was promoted to the rank of General, thus becoming the first Sri Lankan army officer to hold the rank of a full general and longest-serving Commander of the Army.

== Later life ==
On retirement from the army, he took up an appointment as Additional Secretary, Ministry of Defence, and Chief Co-ordinating Authority in the Ministry of Defence in October 1977.

=== Secretary of Defence ===
In the early 1980s, with the escalation of the Tamil Militancy, he was appointed Permanent Secretary, Ministry of Defence on 15 August 1983 succeeding Colonel C. A. Dharmapala, and serving as National Defence Advisor to the President of Sri Lanka. He played a major role during the Vadamarachchi Operation which was stopped midway by Indian intervention. During this time he was the founding chairman, Air Ports and Aviation Services and Chairman of Air Lanka. He stepped down as Secretary, Ministry of Defence on 16 February 1990 and was succeeded by General Cyril Ranatunga.

=== High Commissioner to the United Kingdom ===
Following his tenure as Secretary of Defence, he was appointed High Commissioner for Sri Lanka in the United Kingdom in March 1990 and served till August 1993 when he was succeeded by General Cyril Ranatunga.

=== Death ===
He died on 15 January 2001 in Colombo following a brief illness and his military funeral took place at the General Cemetery, Borella on 17 January.

== Family ==
He was married to Brighty Attygalle who died in July 2010, they had one son Suraj and two grandsons Damin and Shaminda. His brother was Dr. Gamini M. Attygalle, FRCS a leading anaesthesiologist, who was married to Kalyani Wijewardene, daughter of Don Walter T Wijewardene and sister of Upali Wijewardene.

== Honors and decorations ==
During his military career Attygalle had been awarded several decorations. He was made a Member of the Royal Victorian Order (Military Division) (MVO) by Queen Elizabeth II during her Majesty's visit to Ceylon in 1954, which was later upgraded to Lieutenant (LVO) in 1984. For wartime service in World War II with the Ceylon Defense Force, he received the Defence Medal (1946), the War Medal 1939–1945(1946) and the Efficiency Medal (Ceylon) (1950); and for service in the Sri Lankan Army, he received the Ceylon Armed Services Long Service Medal, the Queen Elizabeth II Coronation Medal, the Ceylon Armed Services Inauguration Medal and the Republic of Sri Lanka Armed Services Medal. He received the Vadamarachchi Operation Medal during his service as Secretary of Defence.

=== Honors ===
- Attygalle was promoted to the rank of general upon his retirement in 1977.
- He was awarded the title Deshamanya by the President Sri Lanka in 1990.
- He was a made a Member of the Royal Victorian Order, which was later upgraded to Lieutenant.
- Doctor of Literature (honorary) by the University of Sri Lanka.

== See also ==
- Sri Lanka Armoured Corps
- Sri Lankan Non Career Diplomats
- List of Sri Lankan non-career Permanent Secretaries

Military offices
Preceded by B.R. Heyn	Commander of the Sri Lankan Army; 1967 - 1977	Succeeded by Denis Perera
Diplomatic posts
Preceded by ?	Sri Lanka's High Commissioner to the United Kingdom	Succeeded by ?
