= Mendaka Samarasinghe =

Mendaka Samarasinghe මෙන්දක සමරසිංහ
- Military career
- Branch: Sri Lanka Army
- Rank: Major General
- Unit: Sri Lanka Engineers
- Commands: Chief of Staff, Commander Security Forces Headquarters - Jaffna, 22 Division
- Conflicts: Sri Lankan Civil War, Insurrection 1987-89
- Awards: Rana Wickrama Padakkama, Rana Sura Padakkama, Uttama Seva Padakkama

Major General M.C. Mendaka. P. Samarasinghe, RWP, RSP, USP, ndc, psc, SLE (April 1, 1958) was a Sri Lankan general, he was a former Chief of Staff, Sri Lanka Army and also the former Commander Security Forces Headquarters - Jaffna; he was also the General Officer Commanding, 22 Division.

Samarasinghe was educated at S. Thomas' College, Mt. Lavinia, where he captained the College Boxing Team, led the Junior and Senior Cadet Platoons as the Sergeant, played 2 XV Rugby and was also a college prefect. Smarasinghe joined the army in July 1978 after leaving school and was commissioned into the 1st Field Engineer Regiment, Sri Lanka Engineers in 1980 as a Second Lieutenant after winning the Sword of Honour for the Best All Round Cadet in his batch.

He has several important command and staff appointments such as Overall Operations Commander (Western Province & Colombo), General Officer Commanding 22 Division, Director General General Staff - Army Headquarters, Deputy General Officer Commanding 53 Infantry Division, Brigade Commander - Engineer Brigade, Brigade Commander - 561 Infantry Brigade, Brigade Commander - 552 Infantry Brigade, Commandant - Sri Lanka Military Academy. He has also served as General Staff Officer 1(Plans)-Army Headquarters, Colonel General Staff-55 Infantry Division, Chief Instructor-Army Command and Staff College, Brigadier General Staff - Security Forces HQ (East).

He holds a Master of Science Degree in Defence Studies and a Master of Philosophy in Defence & Strategic Studies from the University of Madras. He has undergone training at College of Military Engineering, India; School of Military Engineering, Malaysia; Defence Services Command and Staff College, India; Engineer School, Fort Leonard Wood, USA; College of Combat, India; Royal Military College of Science, UK; Asia Pacific Centre for Security Studies, Hawaii, USA; and the National Defence College, India.

Major General Samarasinghe has received the Rana Wickrama Padakkama (RWP), Rana Sura Padakkama (RSP), Uttama Seva Padakkama (USP), the Sri Lanka Armed Services Long Service Medal, the Riviresa Campaign Services Medal, the Purna Bhumi Padakkama and the North and East Operations Medal.

Military offices
Preceded by Post created	Chief of Staff Sri Lanka Army; 2009 - Incumbent	Succeeded by Incumbent
Preceded by Post created	Commander Security Forces Headquarters - Jaffna; 2009 - 2009	Succeeded by Incumbent
