= Devinda Kalupahana =

Sri Lanka army general

- Military career
- Branch: Sri Lanka Army
- Service years: 1966–1996
- Rank: Major General
- Unit: Sri Lanka Armoured Corps
- Commands: 23 Division, 2 Division, Sri Lanka Military Academy
- Conflicts: 1971 Insurrection, Sri Lankan Civil War, Insurrection 1987-89
- Awards: Rana Sura Padakkama, Uttama Seva Padakkama

Major General Devinda Kalupahana, RSP, USP, psc, SLAC was a Sri Lankan army general, who was the former GOC, 3 Division; GOC, 2 Division; Director Operations, General Staff and Commandant, Sri Lanka Military Academy.

Educated at Royal College, Colombo, Kalupahana joined the army in 1966 as a cadet officer, undergoing training at the Royal Military Academy Sandhurst. While at Sandhurst, his cadet intake for the winter training exercise were sent to Cyprus when the Cypriot intercommunal violence broke out and the Sandhurst Cadets were deployed until they were relieved by regular units In 1968, he was commissioned into the 1st Reconnaissance Regiment, Ceylon Armoured Corps as a second lieutenant.

After serving as a troop leader in the Ceylon Armoured Corps, he became an officer instructor at the Army Training Centre in Diyatalawa and returned several years later as chief instructor of its successor the Sri Lanka Military Academy. He had also served as a staff officer in the Northern Command Headquarters, Sri Lanka Army Headquarters and the Joint Operations Headquarters. He also served as the commandant of the Combat Training School in Ampara.

Raising the 3rd Reconnaissance Regiment of the Sri Lanka Armoured Corps, he became its first commanding officer in 1988, by then a lieutenant colonel. He then became the commandant of the Sri Lanka Military Academy and went on to take command in the Area Headquarters in Vavuniya.

During Operation Sea Breeze, the first amphibious operation launched by the Sri Lankan military in its history, Colonel Kalupahana led the brigade that landed on the second wave which successfully established the beachhead.

Thereafter he went on to become the director of operations at the Army Headquarters; regimental commander of the Sri Lanka Armoured Corps; general officer commanding of the 3 Division and general officer commanding of the 2 Division. He retired from the army with the rank of major general in 1996.

General Kalupahana is a graduate of the Armed Forces Staff and Command College in Germany. He was awarded the Rana Sura Padakkama (RSP) for combat bravery, the service medal Uttama Seva Padakkama (USP), the Sri Lanka Armed Services Long Service Medal, the Ceylon Armed Services Long Service Medal and the Purna Bhumi Padakkama.

In 2010, he gave evidence to the Lessons Learnt and Reconciliation Commission.
