= Y. Balaretnarajah =

Senior Sri Lankan army general (1939–2022)

Major General Y. Balaretnarajah
- Born: July 22, 1939
- Died: May 29, 2022 (aged 82)
- Military career
- Allegiance: Sri Lanka
- Branch: Sri Lanka Army
- Service years: 1959 – 1992
- Rank: Major General
- Unit: Ceylon Armoured Corps
- Commands: Chief of Staff, Sri Lanka Army; Commandant of the Volunteer Force; 1 Division
- Conflicts: 1971 Insurrection; Sri Lankan Civil War; Insurrection 1987-89
- Awards: Vishista Seva Vibhushanaya; Uttama Seva Padakkama; Sri Lanka Army 25th Anniversary Medal; Ceylon Armed Services Long Service Medal; Sri Lanka Armed Services Long Service Medal; President's Inauguration Medal; Purna Bhumi Padakkama

Major General Y. Balaretnarajah, VSV, USP, ndc (22 July 1939 – 29 May 2022) was a Sri Lankan army officer. He had served as Chief of Staff of the Sri Lanka Army, Commandant of the Volunteer Force and Commander - Jaffna Security Forces. He has commanded the 1 Division, Armoured Brigade, 21 Brigade and 24 Brigade.

== Education ==
Born July 22, 1939 he was educated at St. John's College, Jaffna and at the Jaffna College. Joining the Ceylon Army in November 1959 and he received his basic officer training at Sandhurst. He completed the Armour Young Officers Course of the British Army at the Royal Armoured Corps Training Centre, and Advance Armour Officers Course of the Indian Army. Later he graduated from the National Defence College, India.

== Military career ==
After completion of basic officer training, Balaretnarajah was commissioned as a second lieutenant in the Ceylon Armoured Corps on December 21, 1961. He served as a troop leader of the 1st Reconnaissance Regiment, officer instructor at the Army Training Centre, Diyatalawa and a staff officer at the Army Headquarters and Northern Command Headquarters during the 1971 Insurrection before returning to the 1st Reconnaissance Regiment as a squadron commander with the rank of captain. Promoted to the rank of major, he was appointed deputy commandant at Diyatalawa before becoming a staff officer in the Logistics Command with the rank of lieutenant colonel.

As a colonel he headed the Logistics Command as Director Logistics and was promoted to the rank of brigadier in 1986. With the outset of the Sri Lankan Civil War and the second JVP insurrection he raised and commanded the 24 Brigade based out of Puttalam, and then appointed brigade commander of the 21 brigade based out of Jaffna, before becoming the commander, Security Forces Headquarters – Jaffna (SFHQ-J). During this period he also raised and commanded the armoured brigade.

In 1989, he was promoted to the rank of major general and was appointed the general officer commanding (GOC)- 1 Division. He was then appointed commandant, Sri Lanka Army Volunteer Force before becoming the Chief of Staff of the Sri Lanka Army, also serving as the regimental commander of the Sri Lanka Armoured Corps.

Balaretnarajah retired from the army with the rank of major general in October 1992. He was the president of the Armour Veteran's Association and Vice Patron of the St Johns College Jaffna Old Boys Association South Sri Lanka.

== Personal life ==
Balaretnarajah was married to Sarojini (née Somasundaram), and had three children- Anusha, Arjuna and Brahman. He died on May 27, 2022 at the age of 82.

Military offices
| Preceded by | Chief of Staff of the Sri Lanka Army; 1992 | Succeeded by |
