= T. N. De Silva =

Sri Lankan army general

- Military career
- Branch: Sri Lanka Army
- Service years: 1962–1996
- Rank: Major General
- Unit: Sri Lanka Armoured Corps
- Commands: 23 Division, Sri Lanka Army Volunteer Force, Armoured Brigade
- Conflicts: 1971 Insurrection, Sri Lankan Civil War, Insurrection 1987-89
- Awards: Uttama Seva Padakkama
- Other work: Director, National Cadet Corps

Major General T. N. De Silva, USP (1939 – ) is a former Sri Lanka Army general, who was the former General Officer Commanding, 21 Division;, Commandant, Sri Lanka Army Volunteer Force, Brigade Commander Armoured Brigade and Director, National Cadet Corps.

== Education ==
Educated at Royal College, Colombo, Balasuriya joined the army in 1962 after leaving school and revived officer training at the Indian Military Academy. Thereafter he was commissioned in to the 1st Reconnaissance Regiment, Ceylon Armoured Corps in 1963 as a Second Lieutenant. He underwent training at the Royal Armoured Corps Training Centre, took the Armour Officers Advanced Course in India and attended staff college gaining the psc qualification.

== Military career ==
After serving as a Troop Leader in the Ceylon Armoured Corps, he served as Officer Instructor, Aide-de-Camp to the Army Commander, staff officer of the General Staff, Recruiting Officer and Adjutant of the Ceylon Cadet Corps.

As the Commanding officer he commanded the NCOs' Training wing / Recruit Training school at the Army Training Centre in Diyatalawa and later the Sri Lanka Military Academy. After serving in the Security Forces Headquarters – Jaffna, he became the Commandant of the Infantry Training Centre in Minneriya before returning to Jaffna as Deputy Commander, Security Force Headquarters, Jaffna. During the Insurrection 1987-89 he served as Military Coordinator of the Gampaha District.

Becoming the Director of Armour, he became the Brigade Commander of the Independent Armoured Brigade and later the 21 Brigade and the 33 Brigade. Thereafter he was appointed Director of Personnel Administration at the Army Headquarters, then the commandant, Sri Lanka Army Volunteer Forces and general Officer Commanding, 21 Division. He was the Regimental Commander, Sri Lanka Armoured Corps and later the Director, National Cadet Corps.

General De Silva is a graduate of the Command and Staff College. He was awarded the Uttama Seva Padakkama (USP), the Sri Lanka Armed Services Long Service Medal, the Ceylon Armed Services Long Service Medal, the Purna Bhumi Padakkama.

Military offices
Preceded by	Commandant, Sri Lanka Army Volunteer Force	Succeeded by
