= Gratian Silva =

Sri Lankan army general

Major General Gratian Silva
- Born: January 27, 1933
- Died: November 8, 2015 (aged 82)
- Relatives: Vice Admiral H. A. Silva (Brother)
- Military career
- Allegiance: Sri Lanka
- Branch: Sri Lanka Army
- Service years: 1953–1985
- Rank: Major General
- Unit: Sri Lanka Artillery
- Commands: Northern Command, Western Command, Central Command, Task Force Anti Illicit Immigration, Army Training Centre, 4th Field Regiment
- Conflicts: 1971 JVP insurrection, Sri Lankan Civil War
- Awards: Vishista Seva Vibhushanaya

Major General Hikkaduwage Gratian Silva, VSV, FBIM (27 January 1933 – 8 November 2015) was a Sri Lankan general, he served as the Military Secretary.

== Early life and education ==
Gratian Silva was born in Ginthota, Galle. He received his education at St Thomas College, Mount Lavinia and Ananda College, Colombo, where he excelled in academics and sports, playing for the college cricket team.

== Military career ==
After completing his schooling, he joined the Ceylon Army as an officer cadet on 27 February 1953. He was commissioned as a second lieutenant in the 1st Anti Aircraft Regiment, Ceylon Artillery following his training at the Royal Military Academy, Sandhurst on 3 February 1955 and was stationed in Trincomalie where he served as a troop and battery commander and attended the young officers course at the Royal School of Artillery. He was transferred to the 4th Field Regiment in 1962 following the amalgamation of the 1st Anti Aircraft Regiment and the 3rd Field Regiment as a result of the 1962 coup d'état attempt. Having attended the Staff College, Camberley as a major and gained a Diploma in Management from the British Institute of Management, Silva served in several staff positions at Army Headquarters which included GSO 11 (Training), GSO 11 (Military Intelligence) and GSO 1 (Operations). He was serving as general staff officer I (Operations) at Army Headquarters when the 1971 JVP Insurrection started on 5 April 1971, with a premature insurgent attack on the police station in Wellawaya at dawn. That morning Major Silva accompanied by DIG Rudra Rajasingham flew by helicopter to Wellawaya to inspect the ground situation. Promoted to the rank of lieutenant colonel, he served as Commandant, Army Training Centre and then was appointed commanding officer of the 4th Field Regiment in March 1975 and served till November 1978. Promoted to colonel he served as Commander, Task Force Anti Illicit Immigration; Commander, Northern Command; Coordinating Authority - Rathnapura; Commander, Western Command; Colonel General Staff, Army Headquarters; Commander, Central Command; Director, Budget and Finance Management; Director, Personnel Administration and Military Secretary. His awards include the Vishista Seva Vibhushanaya, Purna Bhumi Padakkama, Republic of Sri Lanka Armed Services Medal, Sri Lanka Army 25th Anniversary Medal, Ceylon Armed Services Long Service Medal, Sri Lanka Armed Services Long Service Medal and President's Inauguration Medal.

== Family ==
His brother was Vice Admiral Hikkaduwage Ananda Silva, became the 11th Commander of the Sri Lankan Navy. His son married Brigadier S.B. Miyanadeniya's daughter.
