= Cyril Ranatunga =

Sri Lankan army general (1930–2021)

General Cyril Ranatunga සිරිල් රණතුංග VSV
- Born: 19 February 1930; Bakmeedeniya, Kegalle
- Died: 16 June 2021 (aged 91); Colombo
- Military career
- Allegiance: Sri Lanka
- Branch: Sri Lanka Army
- Service years: 1950–1983; 1985–1988
- Rank: General
- Unit: Sri Lanka Armoured Corps
- Commands: General Officer Commanding, Joint Operations Command, Chief of Staff of the Sri Lankan Army, Commander, Western Command, Army Training Centre, 1st Recce Regiment
- Conflicts: 1971 Insurrection, Sri Lankan Civil War
- Awards: Vishista Seva Vibhushanaya
- Other work: Secretary of Defence, High Commissioner to Australia, High Commissioner to the United Kingdom

General S. Cyril Ranatunga, VSV (19 February 1930 – 16 June 2021) was a Sri Lanka Army officer. He served as Secretary of Defence, General Officer Commanding, Joint Operations Command and Chief of Staff of the Sri Lanka Army during the 1980s. He was also the Sri Lankan High Commissioner to Australia and later to the United Kingdom.

== Early life ==
Born and raised in the village of Bakmeedeniya, Kegalle, in a family of six children, Ranatunga attended St. Sylvester's College, Kandy; where he excelled at many sports, and captained the hockey and athletic teams. He was the head prefect and won the gold medal for the best all round student in 1949.

== Military career ==
He joined the Ceylon Army in 1950 and received his officer training at Royal Military Academy Sandhurst, where his company commander was Patrick Anthony Porteous. After completing his training at Sandhurst, he was sent to Malaya for additional training at the British Army Jungle Warfare School. On his return he was commissioned as a Second Lieutenant in the Ceylon Light Infantry. Later he was transferred to the 1st Reconnaissance (Recce) Regiment at its formation as the 1st Reconnaissance Squadron in 1955 which grew into the Ceylon Armoured Corps. His squadron was deployed in 1956 to Ampara to subdue the Gal Oya riots and thereafter to Trincomalee to control civil unrest. He underwent training at British Army Armoured Center, Bovington in 1957 as the regimental signals officer of the 1 Recce Regiment. In 1958, he served as a military observer in Lebanon United Nations Observation Group during the Lebanon crisis, rejoining his regiment on his return to Ceylon.

In 1962, he attended the Staff College, Camberley, where he became friends with Major Yakubu Gowon, later General and Head of the Federal Military Government of Nigeria. On his return he was appointed second-in-command of the 1 Recce Regiment. He was thereafter transferred to Army Headquarters as the general staff officer - operations before returning to the 1st Recce Regiment as its commanding officer.

=== Insurrection ===
He was a Lieutenant Colonel and commanding officer of the 1st Recce Regiment when the 1971 Insurrection started and he was appointed the Military Coordinating Officer of the Kegalle District by the Prime Minister, where he effectively subdued the insurgency in the district which had been overrun by insurgents. He was deployed with the 1st Reconnaissance Regiment and a company of the Ceylon Light Infantry. Following the clearing of insurgents from Kegalle, he was appointed Military Coordinating Officer of the Anuradhapura District to lead mop-up operations. He was instrumental in the establishment of the Anuradhapura Army Base as a permanent military complex.

=== Higher command ===
He was nominated to attend the Royal College of Defence Studies in 1973. On his return he was appointed Commander, Northern Command in Anuradhapura and thereafter Commander, South East Command at the Diyatalawa Garrison in February 1975 and in March 1976 he was appointed Commandant of the Army Training Centre. In January 1977, he was appointed Military Secretary and in January 1978 he was appointed Commander, Western Command at the Panagoda Cantonment. On 4 February 1978 he was confirmed to the rank of Brigadier. In January 1980, he was appointed Commander, Support Forces in addition to serving as Commander, Western Command. In this capacity he was instrumental in forming the Army Provident Fund. In February 1982, he was appointed Chief of Staff of the Sri Lanka Army and Commander Security Forces Headquarters – Jaffna. During his tenure he was based at Gurunagar, containing the expansion of the Tamil militancy. To this end he developed military intelligence in Jaffna. In 1983, he retired from the army.

== Airport and Aviation ==
He was appointed an executive director of the Airport and Aviation Services, Sri Lanka and later appointed Chairman of Airport and Aviation Services. In this capacity he oversaw the expansion of the Katunayake International Airport.

== Joint Operations Command ==
He was recalled from retirement on 5 September 1985 and promoted to the rank of Lieutenant General, to serve as the General Officer Commanding, Joint Operations Command (JOC) which had been formed early that year under the command of General Tissa Weeratunga. During this time JOC undertook planning of combined operations, procurement and expansion of the armed forces. Sri Lanka faced restrictions for weapon imports from the West as the case of the US government approving the sale of Cadillac Gage armored cars without turrets and guns; as well as the British government's refusal to supply spare parts for the Alvis Saladins and Ferret armoured cars. As a result, the JOC received support from China and Pakistan. Chinese Type 56 assault rifles replaced self loading rifles as the primary service weapon and Chinese armored vehicles were imported. Israeli Dvora-class fast patrol boat was added to the navy and became its workhorse. His tenure as GOC-JOC saw large scale offensives against the LTTE such as the Vadamarachchi Operation which came close to meeting its objective when it was abandoned due to Indian intervention when military cargo planes escorted by fighter aircraft dropped humanitarian relief supplies in the Jaffna area on June 4 in Operation Poomalai. Indian forces landed in Sri Lanka on July 29 with the signing of the Indo-Sri-Lankan accord.

General Ranatunga was of the opinion that the Indo Lanka Peace Accord was forced down Sri Lanka's throat at a time when the then President, J.R. Jayewardene wanted no such thing. While the ongoing military operation at the time had to be called off due to the Accord, Gen. Ranatunga was confident that, had the operation continued, LTTE Leader Velupillai Prabhakaran would have been captured and the LTTE defeated. On 1 August 1986, he was promoted to full general and was retired from active service in 1988 once again, stepping down as GOC, Joint Operations Command. Ranatunga had stated that President Jayewardene had proposed to promote him to the rank of Field marshal.

== Later work ==
=== Ministry of Defence ===
Following retirement, General Ranatunga served as Chairman of Airport and Aviation Services. In February 1990, President Ranasinghe Premadasa appointed him as Secretary to the Ministry of Defence. As Defence Secretary, he managed the budgetary allocations and administration of the Ministry of Defence and the Armed Forces. He stepped down as Defence Secretary in April 1993. He had been appointed the first Chancellor of the General Sir John Kotelawala Defence Academy in 1990 and held the post till 1995.

=== High Commissioner ===
In April 1993, he was appointed by President Premadasa as Sri Lankan High Commissioner to Australia, which he took up on 1 May 1993, the day President Premadasa was assassinated at a May Day rally in Colombo. As High Commissioner Ranatunga began a project to relocate the Sri Lanka High Commission in Canberra to a new building having purchased land for it. However, four months into his tenure, Premadasa's successor Wijetunga appointed him as Sri Lankan High Commissioner to the United Kingdom. He took up the appointment in October 1993. He served in London for a year and a half until he was recalled by the newly elected President Kumaratunga.

Leaving public life, he lived the remainder of his days at his ancestral home in Mawanella having become a gentleman farmer. He died on 16 June 2021, and per his family's wishes a private funeral took place at Borella General Cemetery on the following day.

== Family ==
On his way to the British Army Armoured Center in Bovington on board P&O liner Orontes, he met Myrtle Sumanasekera, they were engaged on their arrival in London and married soon after. They have two sons. His elder brother who also joined the army retired as a colonel.

== Decorations ==
General Ranatunga has received the Vishista Seva Vibhushanaya, Ceylon Armed Services Long Service Medal, Republic of Sri Lanka Armed Services Medal and the Vadamarachchi Operation Medal. He has received the United Nations Medal for the United Nations Observation Group in Lebanon.
