= H. A. Silva =

Sri Lankan naval officer (1936–1999)

Admiral H. A. Silva VSV
- Born: 4 January 1936
- Died: 24 November 1999 (aged 63)
- Relatives: Major General Gratian Silva (Brother)
- Military career
- Allegiance: Sri Lanka
- Branch: Sri Lanka Navy
- Service years: 1953–1991
- Rank: Admiral
- Commands: Commander of the Sri Lankan Navy

Admiral Hikkaduwage Ananda Silva, VSV (4 January 1936 – 24 November 1999) was a Sri Lankan senior naval officer who was the 11th Commander of the Sri Lankan Navy.

== Education ==
Educated at S. Thomas' College, Mount Lavinia, Silva excelled in sports and studies. He won several prizes and won colours for cricket, athletics, boxing and also was the Vice Captain of the College Boxing Team. His brother was Major General Gratian Silva.

== Naval career ==
Silva joined the then Royal Ceylon Navy as an officer cadet on 12 October 1953 at the age of 17. He was selected for officer training at Britannia Royal Naval College in Dartmouth and graduate in 1956 at the top of his batch. Subsequently as an acting sub lieutenant, he completed the Junior Naval Officers (Lieutenants) Course at the Royal Naval College, Greenwich and attended HMS Mercury and the Royal Naval Engineering College for specialist training. He undertook his sea training on board Royal Navy aircraft carrier HMS Triumph (R16) in the Mediterranean and the North Sea.

On his return to Ceylon, he was promoted to lieutenant and served in several staff appointments at sea and on shore. As Lieutenant Commander, he attended the Defence Services Staff College, Wellington in 1972. Between 1975 and 1980, with the rank of commander he served as the Commanding Officer of SLNS Gajabahu, SLNS Sanudra Devi and the shore establishments SLNS Tissa, SLNS Elara and SLNS Gemunu. Promoted to captain, he was appointed Naval Officer in Charge, Trincomalee. He also held appointment as Master of the Ceylon Shipping Corporation ship MV Lanka Kanthi. In 1981, he graduated from the National Defence College, New Delhi.

Silva was appointed Chief of Naval Staff with the rank of commodore on 1 June 1983. On 1 August 1986, he was promoted to the rank of rear admiral and was appointed Chief of Staff of the Sri Lanka Navy on 1 November 1986 he was appointed as the Navy Commander and was promoted to the rank of Vice Admiral on August 1, 1987. His tenure saw an increase in naval activity due to the escalation of the Sri Lankan Civil War. In May - June 1987, the Sri Lankan Armed Forces launched the Vadamarachchi Operation to defeat the LTTE in Jaffna. At the highlight of the operation, India intervened to pressure the Sri Lanka Government to stop the offensive. The Indian government supported a flotilla of boats that sailed from Tamil Nadu, claiming to bring relief supplies, which the Sri Lankan Navy forced to turn back. India then responded with an air drop of 22 tons of humanitarian relief supplies violating Sri Lankan sovereign airspace with Operation Poomalai. Indian forces landed in Sri Lanka on July 29 with the signing of the Indo-Sri-Lankan accord. Silva retired on 31 October 1991 and was promoted to the rank of full admiral. He was succeeded by Clancy Fernando.

During his long career in the navy he received the Vishista Seva Vibhushanaya, the Ceylon Armed Services Long Service Medal, Sri Lanka Armed Services Long Service Medal, Republic of Sri Lanka Armed Services Medal, Ceylon Armed Services Inauguration Medal, President's Inauguration Medal and the Vadamarachchi Operation Medal.

Military offices
Preceded by Asoka de Silva	Commander of the Sri Lankan Navy; 1986-1991	Succeeded by Clancy Fernando
