= Parry Liyanage =

Sri Lankan general

- Military career
- Allegiance: Sri Lanka
- Branch: Sri Lanka Army
- Rank: Brigadier
- Unit: Sri Lanka Artillery
- Commands: Quartermaster-General, Adjutant General
- Conflicts: Sri Lankan Civil War, Insurrection 1987-89

Brigadier Rohan Parakrama "Parry" Liyanage, RSP, USP was a Sri Lankan military officer, athlete and coach, who was the former Quartermaster-General and Adjutant General of the Sri Lanka Army. He was the National record holder for shot put, senior vice president of the Athletic Association of Sri Lanka and National Athletic Coach.

== Education ==
Liyanage was educated at Royal College, Colombo.

== Military career ==
He joined the army in the first batch of officers to be trained locally at the Officer Cadets’ School of the Army Training Center on 27 April 1968 and was commissioned into the 4th Field Regiment, Ceylon Artillery as a second lieutenant. He went on to serve as the commanding officer of the 6th Field Regiment, Sri Lanka Artillery from September 1988 to February 1990 with the rank of lieutenant colonel. Promoted to the rank of Brigadier, he went on to serve as the Brigade Commander, 6th "Weli Oya" Brigade and commanding officer, Task Force 1.

== Embilipitiya Schoolboys' Affair ==
At the height of the 1987–1989 JVP insurrection, Dayananda Lokugalapaththi, the Principal of Embilipitiya Maha Vidyalaya, got angry at several school boys for mocking the love affairs of his son with another student. Lokugalapaththi had been accused to have had the Army take the school boys to Sevana army camp where they were killed. Colonel Liyanage was the district coordination officer of the area and had been friendly with Lokugalapaththi. The boys were forced to write suicide notes prior to death, forced to eat broken glass and nails, and subsequently buried in the Sooriyakanda mass grave.

After a three-year trial into the disappearances of the students, the High Court of Ratnapura, found Dayananda Lokugalapaththi and several military personnel of the army camp were found guilty of numerous offences under the Penal Code and sentenced to prison terms of ten years. Since the bodies of the students were not discovered, they were not charged of murder. The third accused, Brigadier Liyanage was acquitted on the basis there was no direct evidence against him and his acquittal was not appealed by the State Prosecutor. Based on this judgment, Brigadier Liyanage appeal to the Supreme Court, the denial of his promotion to the rank of major general after he was recommended by the Commander of the Army following his acquittal by the High Court. The Supreme Court found that promotion of other officers in the chain of command during the incident were promoted, it ordered that the recommendation of the Commander of the Army be carried out and compensation given. The Defence Secretary had later reported that the promotion can not be carried out due to the President of Sri Lanka in her capacity as the Commander in Chief, refused to accept the recommendation for promotion and Liyanage had already retired as a Brigadier. Liyanage's appeal to the Supreme Court on this matter resulted in the court stating that it can do no more.
