= K. A. Gamage =

Sri Lankan Army officer

Major K. A. Gamage † PWV
- K. A. ගමගේ
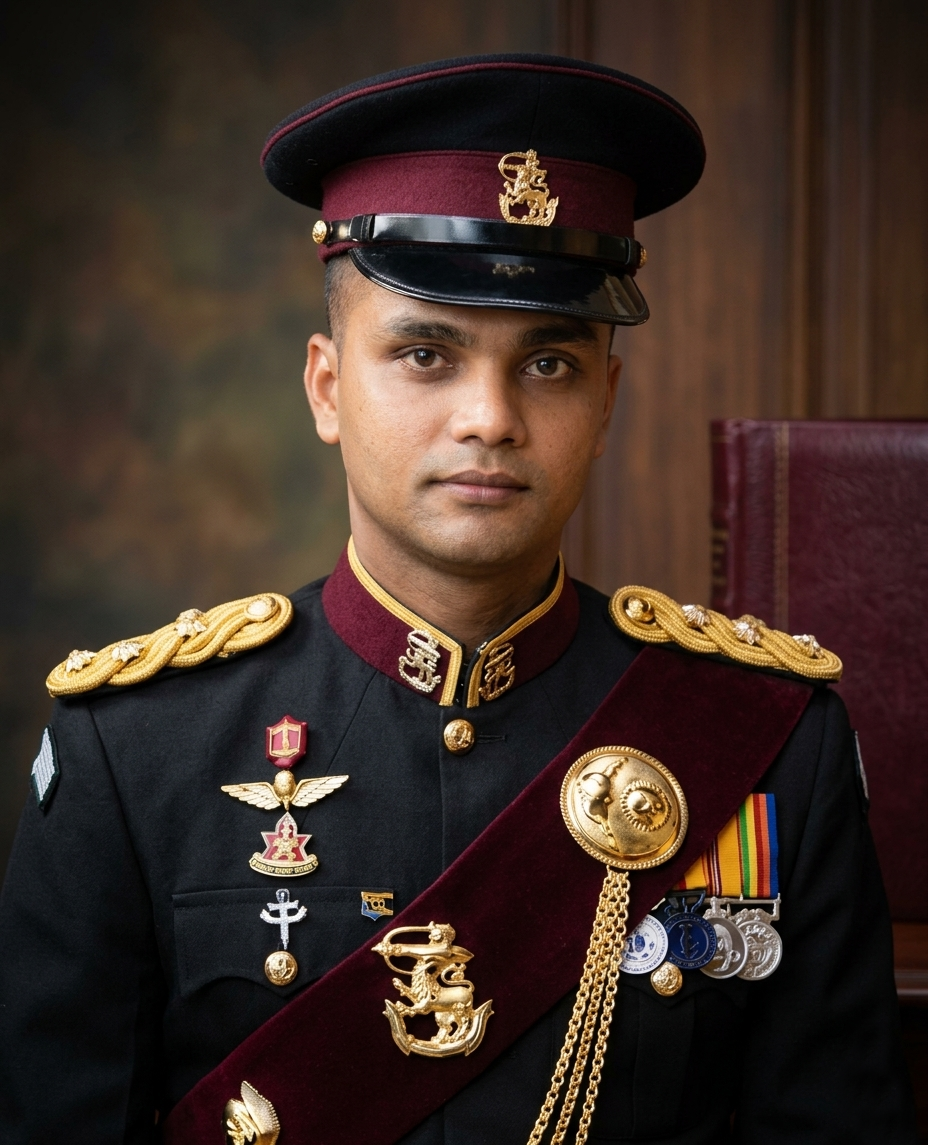
- Born: 17 September 1978
- Died: 20 April 2009 (aged 30); Ampalavanpokkanai, Sri Lanka
- Military career
- Allegiance: Sri Lanka
- Branch: Sri Lanka Army
- Service years: 1998 – 2009
- Rank: Major (Posthumously)
- Service number: O/64743
- Unit: Special Forces
- Awards: Parama Weera Vibhushanaya

Major K. Ajith Gamage, PWV (Sinhala: K. A. ගමගේ, 17 September 1978, died 20 April 2009), was a Sri Lanka Army special forces officer who was posthumously awarded the Parama Weera Vibhushanaya, Sri Lanka's highest military award for gallantry. At the time of his death, he was serving in the army's elite Special Forces Regiment.

== Military career ==
Having joined the Regular Force of the Sri Lanka Army in July 1998, he graduated from the Sri Lanka Military Academy Course 48. Gamage was commissioned into the 6th Battalion, Vijayabahu Infantry Regiment before he joined the Special Forces in 2001 after completing the Special Forces Training Course 27.

== Actions in April 2009 ==
By mid-April 2009, the Sri Lankan Civil War was in its final stages, with the army's northern offensive confining remnants of the Liberation Tigers of Tamil Eelam (commonly known as LTTE or Tamil Tigers) to an approximately 20-square-kilometre (7.7 sq mi) area near the Nanthikadal lagoon, which the government had earlier declared a no-fire-zone to protect civilians. This area was estimated to hold more than 100,000 civilians, and was surrounded by a 3-kilometre (2 mi) long fortified earth bund built by the LTTE.

The 1st Battalion of the Special Forces Regiment was tasked with destroying the bund and facilitating the civilians' escape into government-held territory, and the operation was launched on the night of 19 April 2009, from the Ampalavanpokkanai area. Captain Gamage led one of the contingents for this operation, with orders to capture a section of the bund and cover the civilians' escape but not to advance forward of the bund itself. Gamage and his unit managed to cross the lagoon and reach the bund under the cover of darkness without being detected, and assaulted the Tamil Tiger bunkers along it. They successfully captured a section of the bund, starting a mass exodus of civilians into the government-held areas through it.

However, they soon came under heavy fire from Tamil Tiger positions within the no-fire-zone. In order to protect the civilians and his unit from the fire, Captain Gamage chose to ignore his orders and repeatedly led attacks against these positions into the no-fire-zone. He fought through the night and into the morning of 20 April, until he was killed by LTTE fire. More than 25,000 civilians had reached the government-held areas on 20 April after the bund was captured. The rest of the civilians were evacuated in the days that followed, allowing the military to launch their final assault against the Tamil Tigers and eliminate their leaders. The government officially declared victory and the end of the war a month later on 19 May 2009. He was posthumously promoted to the rank of major. He had married six months before he died.

== Parama Weera Vibhushanaya ==
Captain Gamage was nominated by General Sarath Fonseka for the Parama Weera Vibhushanaya, Sri Lanka's highest military award for gallantry, for his actions on 19 and 20 April 2009. Three years later on 16 May 2012, it was announced in The Sri Lanka Gazette by Defence Secretary Gotabhaya Rajapaksa that Gamage will be posthumously awarded the medal along with 14 others. The citation for his award states:

This officer pioneered to identify terrorist groups correctly who were attacking the security forces whilst hiding amongst innocent civilians and destroyed terrorist elements without causing any damage to civilians. Ultimately, he liberated thousands of civilians who remained detained by the LTTE as hostages.

Gamage's Parama Weera Vibhushanaya was presented to his next-of-kin at the Victory-Day celebrations on 19 May 2012 by Mahinda Rajapaksa, the President of Sri Lanka. He was the fifth and last member of the Special Forces to receive the award.
