= Dennis Hapugalle =

- Military career
- Branch: Sri Lankan Army
- Service years: 1950–1979
- Rank: Brigadier
- Unit: SLAC
- Commands: Civil Defence
- Conflicts: 1971 Insurrection
- Awards: Vishista Seva Vibhushanaya
- Other work: Permanent Secretary, Ministry of Internal Security

Brigadier S. Dennis N. Hapugalle, VSV (1930–2000) was a Sri Lankan military officer, former Chief of Civil Defence and Permanent Secretary, Ministry of Internal Security.

== Education ==
Hapugalle received his educated at Royal College, Colombo.

== Military career ==
He joined the army in 1950 as a cadet officer, undergoing training at the Royal Military Academy Sandhurst. In 1952 he was commissioned in to the Ceylon Electrical and Mechanical Engineers as a second lieutenant and under took the Young Officers' Course at the Royal Electrical and Mechanical Engineer Officer School. With the formation of the 1st Reconnaissance Regiment in 1955 which later became a part of the Ceylon Armoured Corps, he was transferred to it and played a major role in the introduction of armored warfare. Hapugalle under took the Armour Officers Advanced Course at United States Army Armor School and the Command Staff Course at the Command and Staff College gaining the psc qualification. He served as a staff officer in the Army Headquarters and Ceylon Volunteer Force Headquarters. He went on to serve as the commanding officer of the 1st Reconnaissance Regiment from October 1969 to June 1970. During the 1971 Insurrection, as a colonel he was appointed Chief of Civil Defence based in Colombo and thereafter took up appointment as the Military Coordinating Officer for Mannar, commanding military operations in the district. Transferring to the Army Headquarters he became Additional Director, Personal Administration before his retirement with the rank of brigadier. He was awarded the Vishista Seva Vibhushanaya (VSV), Republic of Sri Lanka Armed Services Medal, Sri Lanka Army 25th Anniversary Medal, President's Inauguration Medal and the Ceylon Armed Services Long Service Medal.

== Later life ==
After his retirement he served as Permanent Secretary of the Ministry of Internal Security, Honorary Secretary of the Board for Cricket Control in Sri Lanka and later Managing Director of the Alethea International School.

== See also ==
- List of Sri Lankan non-career Permanent Secretaries
