= C. H. Fernando =

Sri Lankan army general

C.H. Fernando
- Military career
- Branch: Sri Lanka Army
- Service years: 1957–1990
- Rank: Major General
- Unit: Sri Lanka Armoured Corps
- Commands: Director of Operations General Staff, GOC, 2 Division, Commander, Northern Command
- Conflicts: 1971 Insurrection, Sri Lankan Civil War, Insurrection 1987-89
- Awards: Vishista Seva Vibhushanaya
- Other work: Sri Lanka Salaries and Pensions Commission

Major General C.H. Fernando, VSV (1930 – 2020) was a Sri Lanka Army general, who was the former Director of Operations, General Staff; GOC, 2 Division; Commander, Northern Command.

== Biography ==
Educated at the Royal College, Colombo, Fernando graduated from the University of London and went on to join the Ceylon Army in 1957. He was commissioned in to the Ceylon Armoured Corps as a Second Lieutenant after basic training at the Young Officers Course in the UK. He was a graduate of the Staff College, Camberley gaining the psc qualification and attended the Senior Command Course at Army War College, Mhow.

Fernando became an instructor at the Army Training Centre, Diyatalawa and went on to become its Chief Instructor. Serving as the Acting Adjutant General, Army Headquarters, he became the 2IC and then after Commanding Officer, Sri Lanka Corps of Military Police; Officer Cadet School, Army Training Centre, Diyatalawa and the 1st Reconnaissance Regiment, Sri Lanka Armoured Corps. He was the Colonel-Commandant of the Sri Lanka Armoured Corps.

Brigadier Fernando took up the posts of Commander, Northern Command; Commandant, Army Training Centre, Diyatalawa; Commander, Support Forces Headquarters; Director of Training, Army Headquarters; Director of Operations, Army Headquarters; Commander, 21 Brigade; Regimental Commander, Sri Lanka Armoured Corps. In 1988 he was promoted to the rank of Major General and made General Officer Commanding, 2 Division. He was awarded the Vishista Seva Vibhushanaya (VSV), Republic of Sri Lanka Armed Services Medal, Sri Lanka Army 25th Anniversary Medal, President's Inauguration Medal, Purna Bhumi Padakkama and the Ceylon Armed Services Long Service Medal.

After his retirement he was a member of the Member of the Sri Lanka Salaries and Pensions Commission and a patron of the Royal College Union.
