= Gemunu Kulatunge =

Sri Lanka army general

- Military career
- Allegiance: Sri Lanka
- Branch: Sri Lanka Army
- Service years: 1963–1996
- Rank: Major General
- Unit: Sri Lanka Sinha Regiment
- Commands: Deputy Chief of Staff of the Sri Lankan Army
- Conflicts: 1971 Insurrection, Sri Lankan Civil War, Insurrection 1987-89
- Awards: Rana Sura Padakkama, Uttama Seva Padakkama

Major General Gemunu Kulatunge, RSP, USP, ndc, psc (1941–2003) was a Sri Lankan army general, who was the former Deputy Chief of Staff of the Sri Lanka Army.

Educated at Royal College, Colombo, he graduated from the University of Ceylon in 1960 with a Bachelor of Arts (Honours) degree and had won university colours for Rugby. He thereafter joined the Ceylon Army. Having completed his basic officer training at the Army Training Center, Diyatalawa and was commissioned into the Ceylon Sinha Regiment as a second lieutenant on 1 September 1965. He was posted to the 1st Battalion, Ceylon Sinha Regiment from April 1966, in which he served as a platoon commander, adjutant. He then served as company commander, staff officer II at the Army Training Center; staff officer II at Army Headquarters. During the 1971 Insurrection he was appointed military coordinating officer, Kilinochchi District. Promoted to lieutenant colonel, he was appointed commanding officer, 1st Battalion, Sri Lanka Sinha Regiment. He served as commandant, Army Training School, Maduru Oya; Deputy Brigade Commander, 22 Brigade, Trincomalee; military coordinating officer, Matara; Brigade Commander, 12 Brigade; Military Coordinating Officer, Kandy; Brigade Commander, 7 Brigade, Elephant Pass; Commander, Security Forces Headquarters – Jaffna; Principal Staff Officer to Secretary Defence, Operational Headquarters, Ministry of Defence; Commander Task Force-Vavuniya; Adjutant General, Army Headquarters; Operations Commander Colombo and Deputy Chief of Staff of the Army. General Kulatunge is a graduate of the National Defence College, India . He was awarded the Rana Sura Padakkama (RSP), Uttama Seva Padakkama (USP), the Sri Lanka Armed Services Long Service Medal, the Riviresa Campaign Services Medal, the Purna Bhumi Padakkama and the North and East Operations Medal. He retired from the army in 1996.

He was married to Shirani Kulathunge, they had three children. Their son Shewanth Kulatunge, is a colonel in the Sri Lanka Engineers.

Military offices
Preceded by	Deputy Chief of Staff; 1995 - 1996	Succeeded by
