= Nihal Hapuarachchi =

- Military career
- Branch: Sri Lanka Army
- Service years: 1982 -
- Rank: Brigadier
- Unit: Sri Lanka Engineers
- Commands: Director Recruitment, Sri Lanka Army, Brigade Commander 51-3 Brigade, Commandant School of Military Engineering Brigade
- Conflicts: Sri Lankan Civil War, Insurrection 1987-89
- Awards: Rana Sura Padakkama

Brigadier H. A. Nihal Hapuarachchi, RSP, psc, SLE is a Sri Lankan Army officer and a military engineer, who is the current military spokesman, former Brigade Commander, 51-3 Brigade and Commandant, School of Military Engineering. He was also the former Director Recruitment

Educated at the Royal College, Colombo, he captained the college volleyball team and won colours for three sports in 1978. He joined the Sri Lanka Army in 1982 as Officer Cadet, following basic training at the Sri Lanka Military Academy, where he won the President's Medal; he was commissioned in to the Sri Lanka Engineers in as a Second Lieutenant. Hapuarachchi is a graduate of the Command and Staff College, Asia-Pacific Center for Security Studies, Hawaii and holds an MBA from the University of Rajarata. He has undergone training at the College of Military Engineering, Pune, Military College of Engineering, Risalpur and at the Indian College of Defence Management.

During his military service he had served as commanding officer of the 7th Field Engineer Regiment SLE, Chief Instructor at the Sri Lanka Military Academy as well as serving as a staff officer at the former Joint Operational Command, Volunteer Force Headquarters and as Brigadier, general staff at Security Forces Headquarters – Wanni during the height of the Sri Lankan civil war. Prior to taking up duties as the military spokesman he was the brigadier coordinating of the Defence Services Command and Staff College.

Brigadier Hapuarachchi has received the Rana Sura Padakkama (RSP), the Sri Lanka Armed Services Long Service Medal, the Riviresa Campaign Services Medal, the Purna Bhumi Padakkama and the North and East Operations Medal.
