= Henry Athukorale =

Sri Lankan senior army officer (1930–2019)

Lieutenant General Henry Athukorale VSV
- Born: 30 November 1930
- Died: 21 December 2019 (aged 89)
- Military career
- Allegiance: Sri Lanka
- Branch: Sri Lanka Army
- Service years: 1950–1985
- Rank: Lieutenant General
- Service number: O/50124
- Unit: Sri Lanka Light Infantry
- Commands: Commandant, Volunteer Force, Commander, Task Force Anti Illicit Immigration, Inspector General, Field Forces, 1st battalion, Ceylon Light Infantry
- Conflicts: 1971 Insurrection; Sri Lankan Civil War
- Awards: Vishista Seva Vibhushanaya

Lieutenant General Henry Vijaya Athukorale, VSV, psc, FBIM (30 November 1930 – 21 December 2019) was a Sri Lankan senior army officer. He served as Commandant, Volunteer Force and Commander, Task Force Anti Illicit Immigration.

== Military career ==
Having joined the Ceylon Army in September 1950 as a Cadet Officer, he proceeded to Royal Military Academy Sandhurst for officer training. On his return he was commissioned as a Second Lieutenant in the 1st battalion, Ceylon Light Infantry. He attended the Defence Services Staff College. From 1967 to 1970, Major Athukorale served as an Extra ADC to William Gopallawa, Governor-General of Ceylon. Athukorale went on command the 1st battalion, Sri Lanka Light Infantry as a Lieutenant Colonel from July 1970 to February 1976. He led the battalion during its deployment in counterinsurgency operations during the 1971 Insurrection. He translated the history of Light Infantry, and was instrumental in composing the Light Infantry Regimental Song. He drafted the Part I order generally issued by the Colonel of the Regiment or the Commander of the Army.

Promoted to Colonel, he was appointed Commander, Task Force Anti Illicit Immigration serving from 1976 to 1977. He then served as Commandant, Army Training Centre; Acting Director of Personnel Administration, Director Army Sports Boards and Inspector General Field Forces. He was appointed Commandant, Volunteer Force in 1982 with the rank of Major General. He retired from the army on 30 November 1985. After retiring he had served as Honorary Chairman of the SLLI Association and Additional Consultant to the Additional Welfare Council at Ministry of Defence. He was promoted to the rank of Lieutenant General in 2017. He was a Fellow of the British Institute of Management.

== See also ==
- Sri Lankan Civil War
