= Leonard Merlyn Wickramasuriya =

Sri Lankan Army officer

Brigadier Leonard "Lyn" Merlyn Wickramasuriya
- Military career
- Allegiance: British Ceylon; Ceylon
- Branch: Ceylon Defence Force, Ceylon Army
- Service years: 1940–1946, 1949–1969
- Rank: Brigadier (Honorary)
- Nickname: Lyn
- Service number: O/50025
- Units: Ceylon Garrison Artillery, Ceylon Artillery
- Commands: Army Training Centre, 4th Field Regiment, 1st Heavy Anti Aircraft Regiment
- Conflicts: World War II

Brigadier Leonard "Lyn" Merlyn Wickramasuriya (26 March 1916 – 27 June 2002) was a Sri Lanka Army officer, he served as the Commandant, Army Training Centre and Diyatalawa Garrison Commander.

Born on 26 March 1916, Wickramasuriya was educated at Trinity College, Kandy. He was commissioned as a second lieutenant in the Ceylon Garrison Artillery 1 April 1940. From 1941 to 1942, Captain Wickramasuriya served as Officer Commanding, the Ceylon Defence Force contingent deployed to the Cocos Islands and was succeeded by Captain George Gardiner. Under Captain Gardiner's command the CGA detachment mutinied in the Cocos Islands mutiny. With the end of the war, he was demobilized in 1946.

When the Ceylon Army was formed in October 1949, Wickramasuriya commissioned as a captain in it on 11 November 1949. Attached to the 1st Heavy Anti Aircraft Regiment, Ceylon Artillery; he was promoted to the rank of major on 1 June 1952. Promoted to lieutenant colonel on 1 October 1957, he was appointed commanding officer of the 1st Heavy Anti Aircraft Regiment based at the Rock House Army Camp. Following the 1962 coup d'état attempt the 1st Heavy Anti Aircraft Regiment was disbanded in disgrace on 25 April 1962 and its officers and men transferred to the 4th Field Regiment, Ceylon Artillery formed on 26 April 1962 with Colonel Wickramasuriya as its commanding officer until April 1964. On 1 May 1964, Colonel Wickramasuriya was appointed the first of the Commandant, Army Training Centre and Garrison Commander, Diyatalawa. His tenure saw the establishment of the Officer Cadet School in the Army Training Centre under Major Denis Perera to train officers locally with a curriculum based on that of Royal Military Academy, Sandhurst. He served as Commandant until his retirement on 31 December 1969. On 1 November 1999, he was promoted to the honorary rank of brigadier by the president of Sri Lanka. He died on 25 June 2002 and his military funeral was held on 27 June 2002.
