= Rohan Jayasinghe =

Sri Lankan former brigadier (born 1956)

Brigadier Rohan Jayasinghe
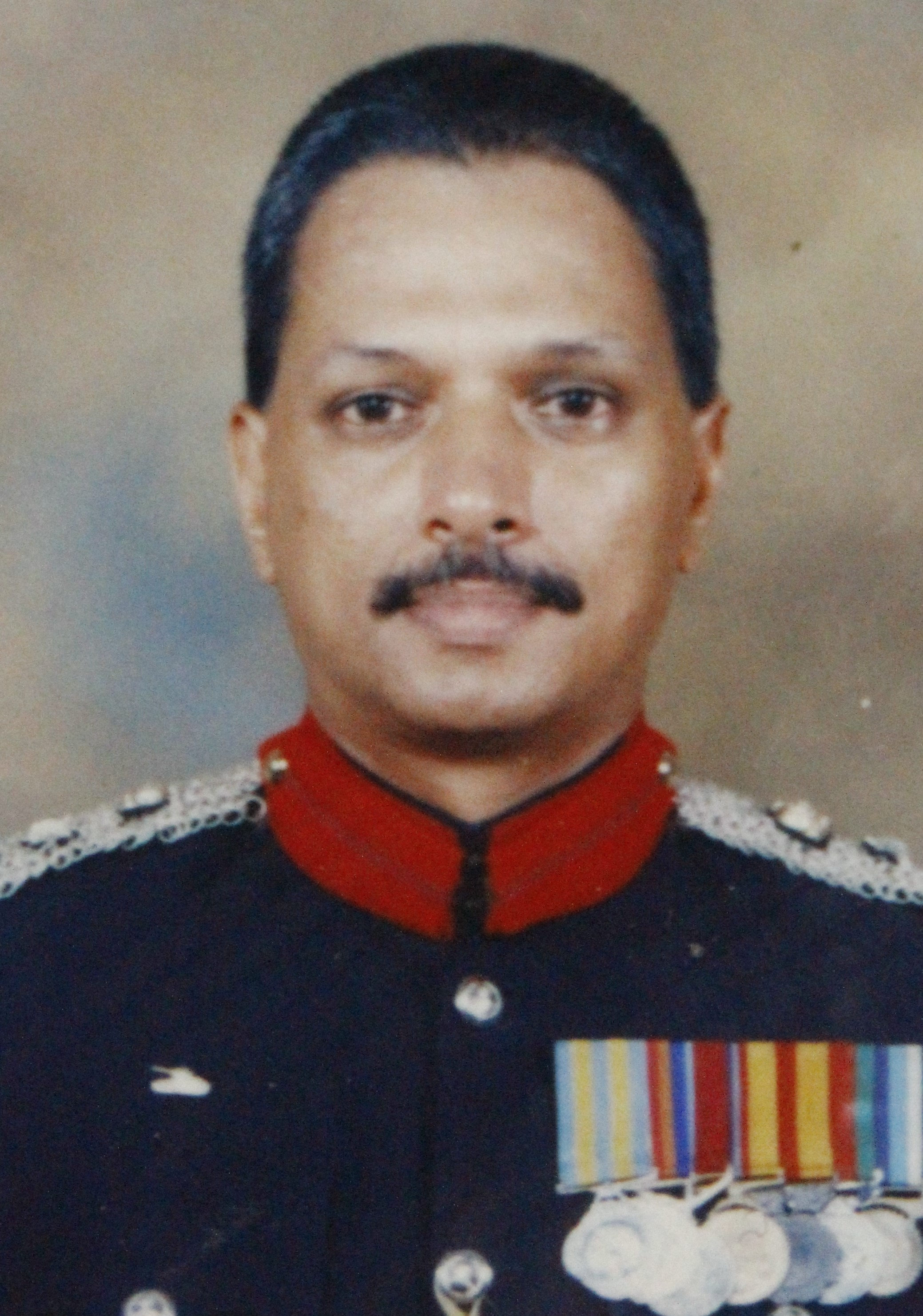
- Born: 17 July 1956 (age 70); Kandy
- Military career
- Branch: Sri Lankan Army
- Service years: 1978-2006
- Rank: Brigadier
- Unit: SLAC
- Commands: 4th Armoured Regiment, Armored brigade, 212 Brigade
- Conflicts: Sri Lankan Civil War, Insurrection 1987-89
- Awards: Uttama Seva Padakkama, US Legion of Merit

Brigadier Rohan M. Jayasinghe, USP, psc, SLAC (born 1956) was a Sri Lankan military officer, former Director Armour; brigade commander, armored brigade; brigade commander, 212 Brigade and Sri Lanka's first Defence, Military, Naval and Air attaché, Sri Lankan Embassy, Washington DC.

Educated at Royal College, Colombo, Jayasinghe joined the army in 1978 as an Officer Cadet, and was commissioned into the 1st Reconnaissance Regiment, Sri Lanka Armoured Corps in 1980 as a Second Lieutenant.

Serving with the 1st Reconnaissance Regiment as a Troop Leader, Adjutant; he went on to serve as a G 3 (Ops) in the first ever Joint Operations Headquarters. He was the first 2iC of the 4th Armoured Regiment - the first ever Tank Regiment of the Army and later commanded the Regiment.

He was appointed as the Chief Instructor of the Sri Lanka Military Academy and was hand-picked to be the first Chief Instructor of the Army Command and Staff College which was the precursor to the Defence Services Command and Staff college.

Becoming the brigade commander of the 212 Brigade, he was also the co-ordinating Officer for Mannar. Thereafter he became the Director of Armour and brigade commander of the Armoured Brigade. Appointed Deputy Commandant, Army Command and Staff College; he was thereafter sent as the first Defence, Military, Naval and Air Attaché of Sri Lanka to the Sri Lankan Embassy in Washington DC. Upon his return from the US, he was assigned to the Security Forces Headquarters - East as Brig GS and was subsequently posted as Commander Southern Command in Boossa, Galle until his premature retirement in 2006.

Jayasinghe was a graduate of the Armed Forces Command Staff College in Malaysia and holds a Diploma in Defence Diplomacy from Royal College of Defence studies/ Cranfield University, UK. He was awarded the service medals Uttama Seva Padakkama (USP), the Sri Lanka Armed Services Long Service Medal, the North and East Operations Medal, Riviresa Campaign Services Medal, Purna Bhumi Padakkama and the Officer degree in Legion of Merit from the US Department of Defence .

Following his retirement he was an Executive Group Director of The Capital Maharaja Organisation Limited and the General Manager of Human Resources of Union Assurance PLC. He then functioned as the consultant for Human Resources at SLINTEC, a leading nanotechnology company in Sri Lanka. Having served 4 Years at SLINTEC, he joined Citizen's Development Business Finance PLC as (again) a Consultant in HR. Currently, he is consultant in HRD at the CINEC Campus and Consultant in HR at SL Mobility (Pvt) Ltd as well.
