= Ariyasinghe Ariyapperuma =

Sri Lankan Army officer

Brigadier Ariyaratne Ariyapperuma †
- Born: 8 December 1933; Ballantudawa, Raigama
- Died: 19 November 1984 (aged 50); Tellippalai, Jaffna
- Military career
- Allegiance: Sri Lanka
- Branch: Sri Lanka Army
- Service years: 1957–1984
- Rank: Brigadier (posthumous)
- Nickname: Ariya
- Unit: Gemunu Watch
- Commands: Northern Command, Operations Command Colombo, 1st Gemunu Watch
- Conflicts: Sri Lankan Civil War

Brigadier Ariyaratne "Ariya" Ariyapperuma, psc, GW was a Sri Lankan Army officer, who was the Commander of the Sri Lanka Army Northern Command.

Ariyapperuma joined the army in the first batch of cadet officers to undergo training at the newly established Army Training Centre and was commissioned as a second lieutenant in the 1st Battalion of the Sri Lanka Sinha Regiment in 1958. In 1962, now Captain Ariyapperuma was transferred to the 1st Gemunu Watch. Having attended Staff College, Camberley, he served as the commanding officer of the 1st Gemunu Watch from December 1977 to January 1980 with rank of lieutenant colonel.

In 1983, as a colonel he was serving as Commander (Operations), Colombo when the Black July riots broke out in the city and surroundings. In September 1983, he took over as Commander, Northern Command in the Jaffna Peninsula. There he was killed on 19 November 1984, when his jeep hit a landmine on the Vallai-Tellipalai-Araly road in Tellippalai, Jaffna. At the time he was the most senior officer of the Army to be killed in the line of duty and was promoted to the rank of Brigadier posthumously and the Brigadier Ariyapperuma Memorial Hall at the Kuruwita Army Camp was named in his honor at the Regimental Headquarters of the Gemunu Watch.
