= S. B. Miyanadeniya =

Sri Lankan military leader

Brigadier S.B. Miyanadeniya
- Military career
- Allegiance: Sri Lanka
- Branch: Sri Lanka Army
- Rank: Brigadier
- Conflicts: 1971 JVP insurrection

Brigadier S. B. Miyanadeniya was a Sri Lankan military leader, he served as the Director Training, Sri Lanka Army.

Hailing from Kurunegala, Miyanadeniya joined the newly formed Ceylon Army and received his basic training at Royal Military Academy, Sandhurst. He was commissioned as a second lieutenant in the 1st Battalion, Ceylon Light Infantry. Promoted to lieutenant colonel, he was appointed commanding officer of the 1st Battalion, Gemunu Watch in July 1970 and lead the battalion through the 1971 JVP Insurrection, conducting counterinsurgency operations. In December 1971, he took over as commanding officer of the 1st Battalion, Sri Lanka Sinha Regiment and served till April 1974. He retired from the army having served as Director Training, on completing four years in the rank of Brigadier.

His daughter married Major General Gratian Silva's son.
