= Jayantha de S. Jayaratne =

Sri Lanka Army general

- Military career
- Allegiance: Sri Lanka
- Branch: Sri Lanka Army
- Rank: Major General
- Unit: Sri Lanka Artillery
- Commands: Commander Security Forces Headquarters - Jaffna (SF HQ (J))
- Conflicts: 1971 Insurrection, Sri Lankan Civil War; Insurrection 1987-89
- Awards: Vishista Seva Vibhushanaya

Major General Jayantha de S. Jayaratne, VSV was a Sri Lanka Army general, who was the former Commander Security Forces Headquarters - Jaffna (SF HQ (J)).

Educated at Royal College, Colombo, he joined the Ceylon Army and received his basic officer training at the Royal Military Academy, Sandhurst where he was awarded the Overseas officers Cane in 1956 for the Overseas Officer Cadet obtaining the highest place in the Order of Merit of Passing Out. On his return to Ceylon he was commissioned as a Second Lieutenant in the 4th Field Regiment, Ceylon Artillery. He was the first Sri Lankan officer to become qualified as an Instructor in Gunnery (IG). In 1963, he was transferred to the newly formed 4th Field Regiment following the attempted military coup. He served as the commanding officer of the 4th Field Regiment, Sri Lanka Artillery from February 1981 to January 1982. He served as Commander Security Forces Headquarters (Jaffna) from 1987 to 1988.

Major General Jayaratne was a graduate of the National Defence College, India gaining the ndc qualification. He was awarded the Vishista Seva Vibhushanaya (VSV) in 1987 and died in 1988.

Military offices
Preceded by	Commander Security Forces Headquarters - Jaffna	Succeeded by
