= B. K. V. J. E. Rodrigo =

Brigadier Bastian Koralalage Victor Justus Ethelred Rodrigo VSV was a Sri Lankan military leader, he served as the commandant of the Volunteer Force.

Rodrigo was commissioned as a second lieutenant in the 1st Anti Aircraft Regiment, Ceylon Artillery following his training at the Royal Military Academy, Sandhurst. He was transferred to the 4th Field Regiment in 1963 following the amalgamation of the 1st Anti Aircraft Regiment and the 3rd Field Regiment as a result of the 1962 coup d'état attempt. Having attended the Staff College, Camberley, Colonel Rodrigo served as commander, Task Force Anti Illicit Immigration from December 1971 to November 1972. He retired from the army with the rank of brigadier, having served as the commandant of the Volunteer Force from 1977 to 1981. Following his retirement, he served as the Director of the National Cadet Corps from 1991 to 1994.
