= Military Secretary (Sri Lanka) =

Military Secretary is a senior position in the General Staff of the Sri Lanka Army, the post is held by a senior officer of the Major General rank. The Military Secretary's Branch is responsible for handling all matters pertaining to officers such as promotions, postings and discipline of the Sri Lanka Army. The current Military Secretary is Major General S.W.M Fernando WWV RWP RSP VSV USP ndc psc. He assumed office on December 21, 2022.

== Past Military Secretaries ==
- Brigadier Rohan Daluwatte
- Brigadier M. H. Gunaratne
- Major General Deepal Alwis
- Major General Sunil Silva
- Brigadier G.S. Padumadasa VSV USP
- Maj Gen H C P Goonetilleke RSP USP ndc psc
- Maj Gen S Ranasinghe RWP RSP ndu psc
- Maj Gen Ajith Wijesinghe USP ndu psc
