= Echelon Barracks =

Military barracks in Colombo, Sri Lanka

- Colombo
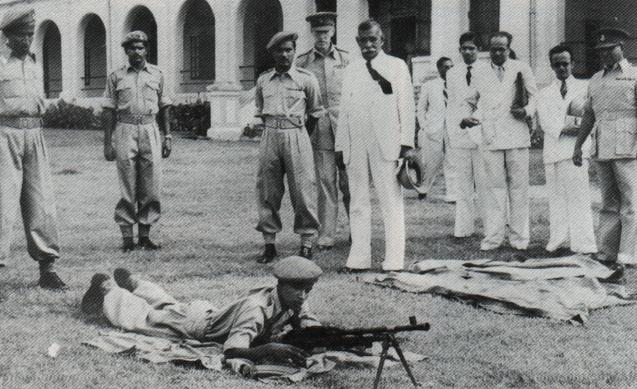
- First Prime Minister of Independent Sri Lanka Hon. D.S.Senanayaka visiting the 1st battalion of the CLI at the Echelon Square and watching volunteers being trained to handle light machine guns.

Site information
- Type: Headquarters building

Location
- Location within Sri Lanka
- Coordinates: 6°55′56″N 79°50′39″E

Site history
- Built: 1880s
- In use: 1880s – 1970s

Garrison information
- Garrison: Ceylon Artillery

Echelon Barracks was a former military barracks situated in Colombo Fort, Colombo. It was occupied by the newly formed Ceylon Army following independence.

== History ==
Built during the late nineteenth century as headquarters of the British Army Garrison of Ceylon, the camp was made up of a two-storey barrack blocks, with wide verandahs, formed a square around a parade ground large enough for several football and hockey pitches. This parade ground gained the name Echelon Square and adjoined the then old Parliament (now the Presidential Secretariat). Until 1963 it was the regimental headquarters of the Ceylon Artillery and housed the Ministry of Defence. In the early 1970s the barracks were demolished to make way for commercial development.

Since 1997 the World Trade Centre, Colombo has stood in Echelon Square.
