= Security Forces Headquarters – Jaffna =

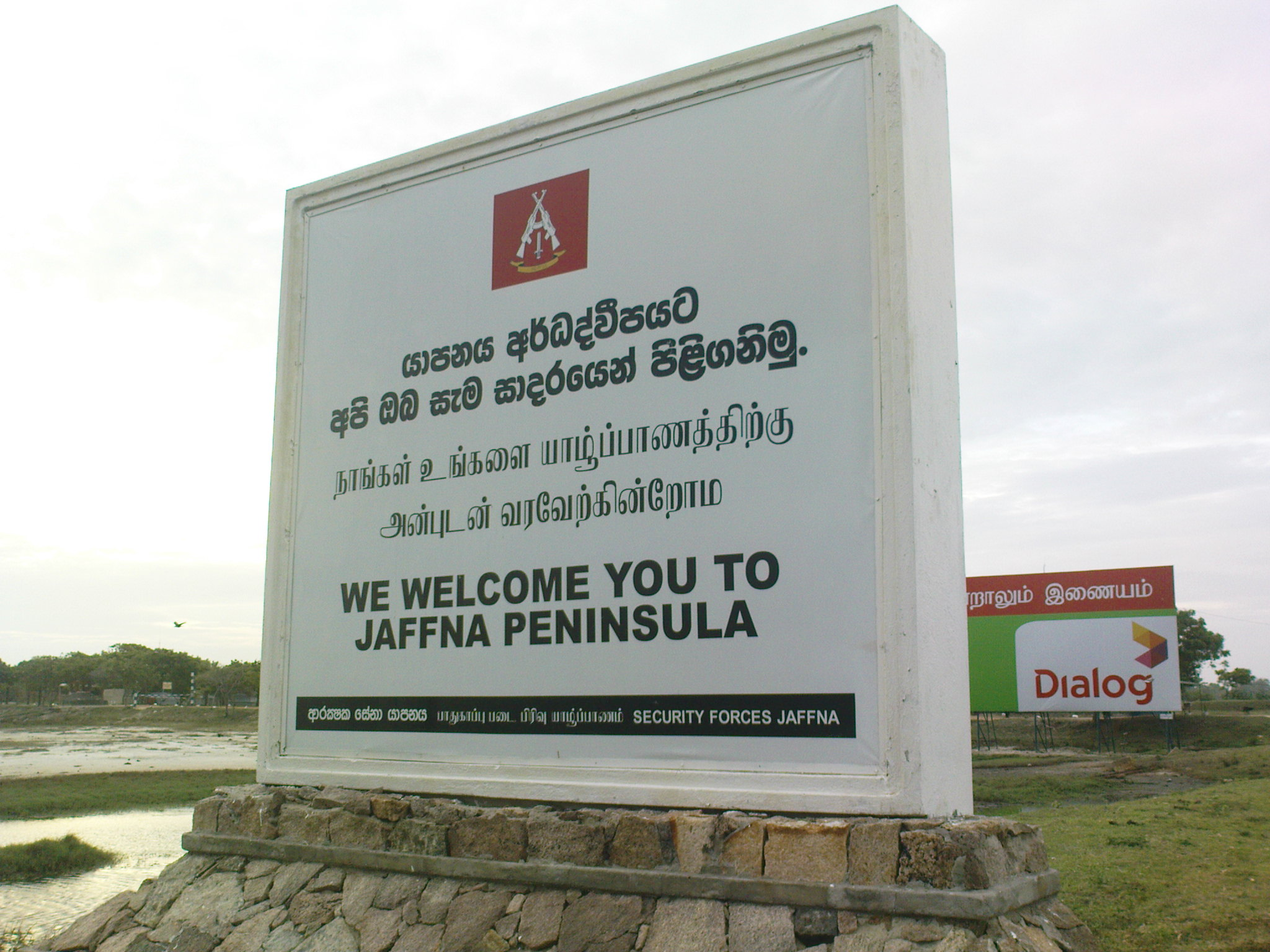
- Active: 1982–present
- Country: Sri Lanka
- Branch: Sri Lanka Army
- Type: Command
- Size: 3 Divisions
- Garrison/HQ: Palaly Military Base
- Engagements: Sri Lankan Civil War

Commanders
- Current commander: Major General Y A B M Yahampath
- Notable commanders: Denzil Kobbekaduwa

Security Forces Headquarters – Jaffna (SFHQ-J) is a regional command of the Sri Lanka Army, that is responsible for the operational deployment and command all army units stationed in and around the Jaffna Peninsula in the Northern Province.

It is the most senior of the five Security Forces Headquarters and the General Officer Commanding it is one of the most senior officers in the army, the post is designated as Commander Security Forces Headquarters – Jaffna. The current Commander SFHQ-J is Major General Ruwan Wanigasooriya. The SFHQ-J is based at the Palaly Military Base. At the height of the Sri Lankan Civil War, SFHQ-J included several divisions and the independent brigades. At certain times, SFHQ-J would be under the command of an Overall Operational Commander.

Area of responsibility includes Jaffna District.

== History ==
The first permanent formation to be established in the Jaffna Peninsula since Ceylon gained its independence from the British in 1948 was the headquarters established by the Ceylon Army for "Operations Monty" in 1952 to stop illegal immigration of Indian Tamils. In 1963, "Operations Monty" was renamed Task Force Anti Illicit Immigration (TFAII), expanding its role in supporting the Royal Ceylon Navy coastal patrols and Ceylon Police Force operations in the Northern Province to intercept illicit immigration and smuggling. With the escalation of the Tamil militancy in the Jaffna Peninsula, TFAII was disbanded and replaced with the Task Force 4 Northern Command that served as a field formation for counter insurgency operations in the Northern Province. In 1982, it was renamed the Northern Command which became the permanent headquarters for army units based in the Northern Province, and in 1986 this headquarters was renamed as Security Forces Headquarters (Jaffna) in 1986. In late 1989, the headquarters and units attached to it was reorganized as the 21 Brigade. Following failed peace talks in 1994, and increased military operations in the Jaffna Peninsula, 21 Brigade was renamed Task Force 1. By 1996, Task Force 1 had a tactical area covering the Jaffna Peninsula and area up to Kilinochchi with several divisions under its command, therefore Task Force 1 HQ was converted as the Security Forces Headquarters – Jaffna.

== Composition ==
SFHQ-J has three divisions under its command;

- 51 Division, based in Jaffna
  - 511 Brigade
  - 512 Brigade
  - 513 Brigade
  - 515 Brigade
- 52 Division, based in the Jaffna Peninsula
  - 521 Brigade
  - 522 Brigade
  - 523 Brigade
- 55 Division, based in Elephant Pass, Jaffna Peninsula
  - 551 Brigade
  - 552 Brigade
  - 553 Brigade
- Forward Maintenance Area (North)

== Past Commanders ==
Task Force 4 Northern

- Colonel C.H. Fernando (1981 - 1983)
- Colonel A Ariyapperuma (1983 - 1984) †
- Colonel S M A Jayawardena (1983 - 1985)
- Lieutenant Colonel D E C Waidyaratne (1985 - 1985)
- Colonel Gratian Silva (1985 - 1985)
- Colonel C J Abeyratne (1985 - 1986)

Security Forces Headquarters (Jaffna)

- Brigadier H F Rupasinghe (1986 - 1986)
- Brigadier G. H. De Silva (1986 - 1987)
- Brigadier J I De Jayaratne (1987 - 1988)
- Brigadier T. N. De Silva (1988 - 1989)
- Brigadier Y. Balaratnaraja (1989 - 1989)

21 Brigade Headquarters

- Brigadier W I V K M Wimalaratne (1991 - 1992) †
- Brigadier R de S Daluwatte (1992 - 1992)
- Brigadier G P Kulatunga (1992 - 1993)
- Brigadier J Nammuni (1993 - 1993)
- Brigadier A K Jayawardena (1993 - 1994)

Task Force 1 Headquarters

- Major General H S Hapuarachchi (1995 - 1995)
- Brigadier R P Liyanage (1995 - 1996)
- Brigadier L C R Gunawardena (1996 - 1996)

Security Forces Headquarters

- Major General L P Balagalla (1997 - 1998)
- Major General L C R Gunawardena (1998 - 1999)
- Major General P S C Munasinghe (1999 - 1999)
- Major General J K N Jayakodi (1999 - 2000)
- Major General A M C W P Senevirathne (2000)
- Major General G S C Fonseka (2000)
- Major General A E D Wijendra (2000 - 2001)
- Major General M D S Chandrapala (2001 - 2001)
- Major General D S K Wijesooriya (2001 - 2002)
- Major General G S C Fonseka (2002 - 2003)
- Major General M D S Chandrapala (2003 - 2004)
- Major General S D Thennakoon (2004 - 2005)
- Major General G A Chandrasiri (2005 - 2009)
- Major General M C M P Samarasinghe (2009 - 2009)
- Major General G R De Silva (2009 - 2009)
- Major General L B R Mark (2009 - 2010)
- Major General M Hathurusinghe (2010 - 2014)
- Major General Udaya Perera (2014 - 2014)
- Major General K J Alwis (2014 - 2015)
- Major General N Udawatta (2015 - 2016)
- Major General N U M M W Senanayake (2016 - 2017)
- Major General D D U K Hettiarrachchi (2017 - 2019)
- Major General P R Wanigasooriya (2019 - )
