= Sri Lanka Military Academy =

Academy of Sri Lanka Army in Diyatalawa, Sri Lanka

Sri Lanka Military Academy Diyatalawa
- Sri Lanka Military Academy's crest
- Former names: Army Recruit Training Depot (1950–58); Army Training Centre (1958–81)
- Motto: Serve to Lead
- Type: Military academy
- Established: 6 February 1950; 76 years ago as Army Recruit Training Depot
- Affiliations: General Sir John Kotelawala Defence University
- Commandant: Major General U L J S Perera
- Location: Diyatalawa, Uva Province, Sri Lanka
- Nickname: SLMA
- Website: https://alt.army.lk/slma/

Location of SLMA

The Sri Lanka Military Academy (Sinhala: ශ්‍රී ලංකා යුද්ධ හමුදා විද්‍යාපීඨය, romanized: śrī laṁkā yuddha hamudā vidyāpīṭhaya) (SLMA or SLMA Diyatalawa), commonly known simply as Diyatalawa, is the oldest military academy in Sri Lanka, and trains cadets for the Sri Lanka Army. It is located in the garrison town of Diyatalawa in the central highlands of Sri Lanka. It has capacity to train more than 300 cadets.

== History ==
=== Army Training Centre ===
Diyatalawa had been the traditional training grounds for the Ceylon Defence Force. When the Ceylon Army was raised in 1949, the need arose to recruit and train officers and soldiers of the newly formed regular army. The first batch of ten Officer Cadets were enlisted to the Army on the 10 October 1949 and were dispatched to Royal Military Academy Sandhurst. The Army Recruit Training Depot (ARTD) was formed in Diyatalawa on 6 February 1950 for the purpose of training recruits. The first batch of 114 recruits passed out from the ARTD on 2 June 1950. The ARTD was later named as the Army Training Centre (ATC). The Ceylon Army continued to send its Officer Cadets to RMA Sandhurst in the 1950s decade.

=== Officer Cadet School ===
Due to the cost of training officers overseas, the Ceylon Army initiated officer training at the Army Training Centre in 1968 with the formation of the Officer Cadet School. The first intake of 13 Officer Cadets who were earmarked to be trained at the Army Training Centre, Diyatalawa, were enlisted on 16 April 1968. The 1971 JVP insurrection, saw the Officer Cadet Intake 4 expanding to 30 cadets.

=== Sri Lanka Military Academy ===
Since then Officer Cadets were locally trained and commissioned. With the expansion and the growing need to train large numbers of recruits, recruit training was assigned to the respective regiments. In 1988 due to the expansion of the Army and the need for more young officers the ATC was given the responsibility of training only Officer Cadets. With this, the Army Training Centre was re-designated as the Sri Lanka Military Academy with effect from 15 January 1981, and since then it has been totally utilized for training of Officer Cadets. At any one time, five to six hundred Officer Cadets are trained at this institution. In 1999, the regular long course was elevated to the standards of bachelor's degree in military studies which was awarded by the Sabaragamuwa University of Sri Lanka. This was shifted to the General Sir John Kotelawala Defence University in 2011.

SLMA started academic programs for mid-career Officers in basic command and staff techniques at the level of Grade III/II appointments, (Officers in the ranks of Lieutenant / Captain / Major), with the establishment the Officers Study Centre (OSC) in 1981 which conducted the Junior Command Course (JCC) and the Junior Staff Course (JSC). In 2012, these programs of the OSC were transferred to the newly established Officer Career Development Centre.

== Organisation ==
In overall command of the SLMA is the Commandant of the academy, usually an officer of Major General Rank.

SLMA has several Commissioning Courses each year. Each new intake numbers approximately 150 cadets, each of whom joins a company. The commissioning course is split up into three terms, each lasting fourteen weeks, and on each course, cadets are put into one of four companies. There can be as many as several companies within the SLMA at any one time, each commanded by a Major and named after a famous battle in Sri Lankan history.

The SLMA orgernization is as follows:

- SLMA HQ
  - Officer cadet wing
    - Vijithapura Company (named after the Battle of Vijithapura)
    - Gannoruwa Company (named after the Battle of Gannoruwa)
    - Randeniwela Company (named after the Battle of Randeniwela)
    - Balana Company (named after the Battle of Balana)
  - Military training wing
  - Academic wing
  - Admin wing

=== Cadet ranks ===
- Battalion Under Officer
- Company Under Officer
- Platoon Under Officer
- Battalion Sergeant Major
- Battalion Quarter Master Sergeant
- Company Sergeant Major
- Company Quarter Master Sergeant
- Sergeant
- Corporal
- Lance Corporal
- Cadet

== Colours ==
The President's and ATC colours presented to the ATC in 1972, were laid to rest with the change of name to Sri Lanka Military Academy. The Colours were renamed as SLMA Colours and presented by Her Excellency Chandrika Bandaranaike Kumaratunga, the President of the Democratic Socialist Republic of Sri Lanka, on 21 June 1997, at Diyatalawa.

== Traditions ==
Upon completion of their training, the SLMA hosts the Commissioning ceremony attended by the Commander of the Army, senior army officers, defence attaches of diplomatic establishments and parents. It starts off with the Passing-Out Parade made up of the graduating intakes of cadets, during which the cadets receive the President's Commission along with the Sword of Honour and Trophies, awarded to the cadets first in order of merit. This is followed by the Pipping ceremony where parents of new Officers and Lady Officers adorned their uniform and epaulets with the respective insignia. The event is finished with the Commissioning Dinner.

== Training ==
Since April 1968, each year SLMA takes a new intake of officer cadets, who on completing their training would be commissioned into the Regular Force of the Sri Lanka Army for a mandatory service of ten years.

The regular intake, known as the Regular Long Course (Cadet Entry Degree Program) is two years and nine months long. During this period, cadets are trained in leadership, tactics, weapons training, military law, military accounting systems and academic studies such as General Science, Management, and General Studies. An intensive course in the English language is conducted during the first six months of training to enhance the English knowledge of Officer Cadets. Completion of research work is a partial fulfillment for the Degree other than the Military and Academic Components. It is accredited to the General Sir John Kotelawala Defence University for the award of the Bachelor of Science in Military studies degree on successful completion of the program.

In addition to the SLMA regular intake, army officer cadets from General Sir John Kotelawala Defence University spend their final year at the SLMA.

Additional intakes have been admitted to the academy starting with Volunteer Force Quartermasters. With increased war time demands on the army underwent a rapid expansion. To meet need of new officers the ATC increased the numbers of the regular intake and initiated a short commissioning course as the volunteer officers transitioned from reservists to a mobilized short service commission in the 1980s. Direct Enlisted Courses of three-month duration are carried out for officer direct entry stream to the Regular Force for professionals such as Doctors, IT specialists, Civil Engineers, Accountants. It also has undertaken to train Officer Cadets from the Maldives and Bangladesh since 1992.

The Military Training Wing of the SLMA conducts the Drill Instructor Course for Non commissioned officers.

== Commandants ==
Officers commanding of the Army Recruit Training Deport

- Major R. D. Jayathileke (1949–1952)
- Major Richard Udugama (1952–1956)
- Major S. D. D. Samarasinghe (1956)
- Major John Halangode (1957–1958)

Commanding officer of the Army Training Center

- Lieutenant Colonel B. J. H. Bahar (1958–1962)
- Lieutenant Colonel John Halangode (1962–1963)
- Lieutenant Colonel L. H. D. De Silva (1963–1964)

Commandants of the Army Training Center

- Colonel Leonard Merlyn Wickramasuriya (1964–1968)
- Lieutenant Colonel Denis Perera (1969–1972)
- Lieutenant Colonel B. K. V. J. E. Rodrigo (1972–1973)
- Colonel Duleep Wickramanayake (1974)
- Lieutenant Colonel Gratian Silva (1974–1975)
- Colonel Cyril Ranatunga (1975–1976)
- Colonel Henry Athukorale (1977)
- Colonel E. G. Thevanayagam (1977–1978)
- Colonel C. A. M. N. Silva (1978–1981)
- Colonel S. M. A. Jayawaradene (1981)

Commandants of the Sri Lanka Military Academy

- Colonel S. M. A. Jayawaradene (1981)
- Colonel Jayantha de S. Jayaratne (1981–1982)

Commandants of the Army Training Center

- Colonel Jayantha de S. Jayaratne (1981–1983)
- Colonel M. H. Gunaratne (1983–1984)
- Colonel L. P. G. Fernando (1984–1985)
- Colonel C.H. Fernando (1985–1986)
- Colonel Rohan Daluwatte (1986–1988)
- Colonel Srilal Weerasooriya (1988–1989)
- Colonel Devinda Kalupahana (1989–1991)
- Colonel L. C. R. Gunawardene (1991–1992)

Commandants of the SLMA

- Colonel L. C. R. Gunawardene (1992)
- Brigadier A. E. D. Wijendra (1992–1994)
- Brigadier G. Hettiarachchi (1994–1998)
- Brigadier Percy Fernando (1998–2000)
- Brigadier Niranjan Ranasinghe (2000–2002)
- Brigadier Jagath Jayasuriya (2002–2004)
- Brigadier Mendaka Samarasinghe (2004–2006)
- Brigadier Janaka Walgama (2006–2008)
- Brigadier Kumudu Perera (2008–2009)
- Brigadier Ruwan Kulatunga (2009–2012)
- Brigadier Indunil Ranasinghe (2012–2014)
- Major General Dushyantha Rajaguru (2014–2016)
- Brigadier HHASPK Senarathna (2017–2019)
- Brigadier S. K. Eshwaran (2019–2020)
- Major General AKGKU Gnanaratne (2020–2021)
- Major General WWHRRVMNDKB Niyangoda (2021–2022)
- Major General IANB Perera (2022–2023)
- Major General U L J S Perera (2024

== Alumni ==
Since officer training began in 1968, the ATC and the SLMA has produced the officers who have taken part in and led all military operations the Sri Lanka Army has engaged in since then. Since 2000, all officers who served as the Commander of the Sri Lanka Army have been trained at the ATC/SLMA. Its alumni includes Field Marshal Sarath Fonseka, President Gotabaya Rajapaksa, and Major General Sarath Munasinghe.

Notable alumni

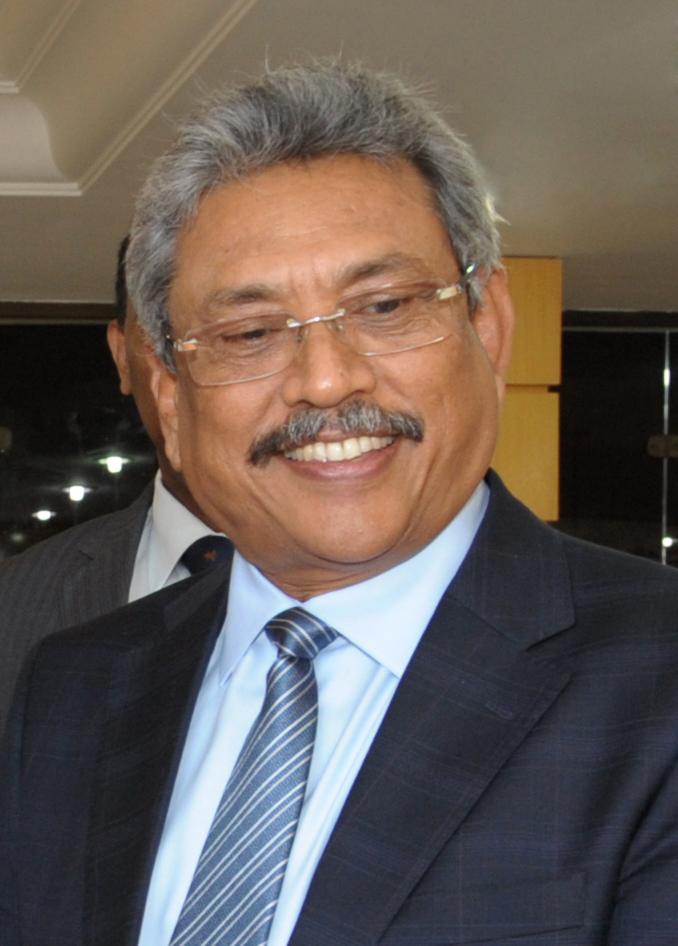
Gotabaya Rajapaksa

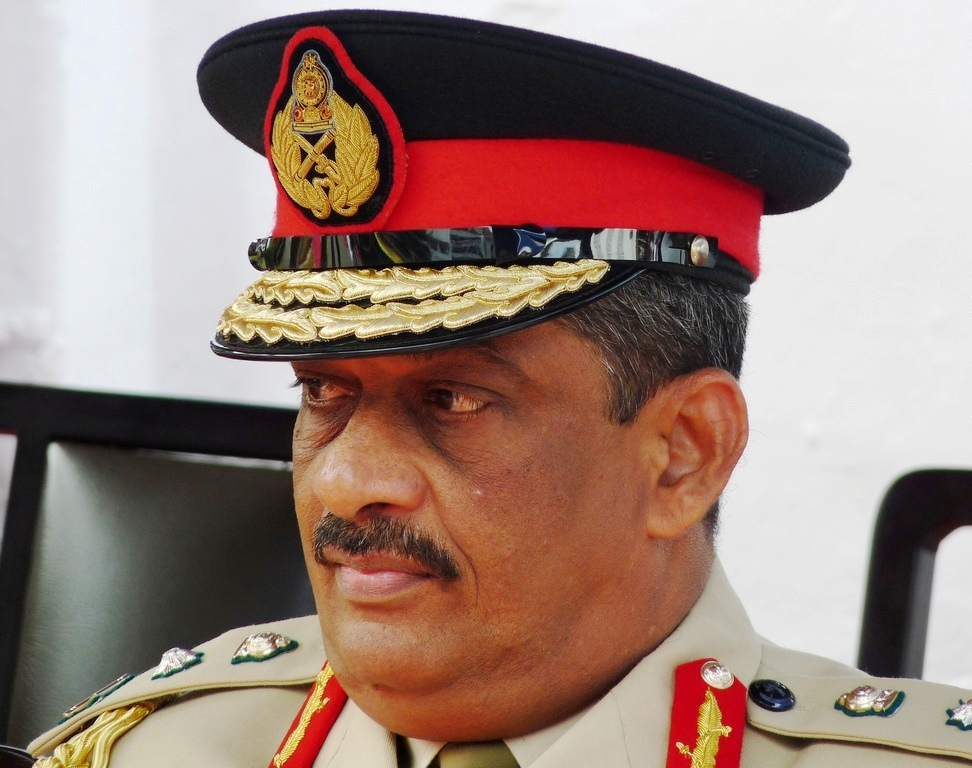
Sarath Fonseka

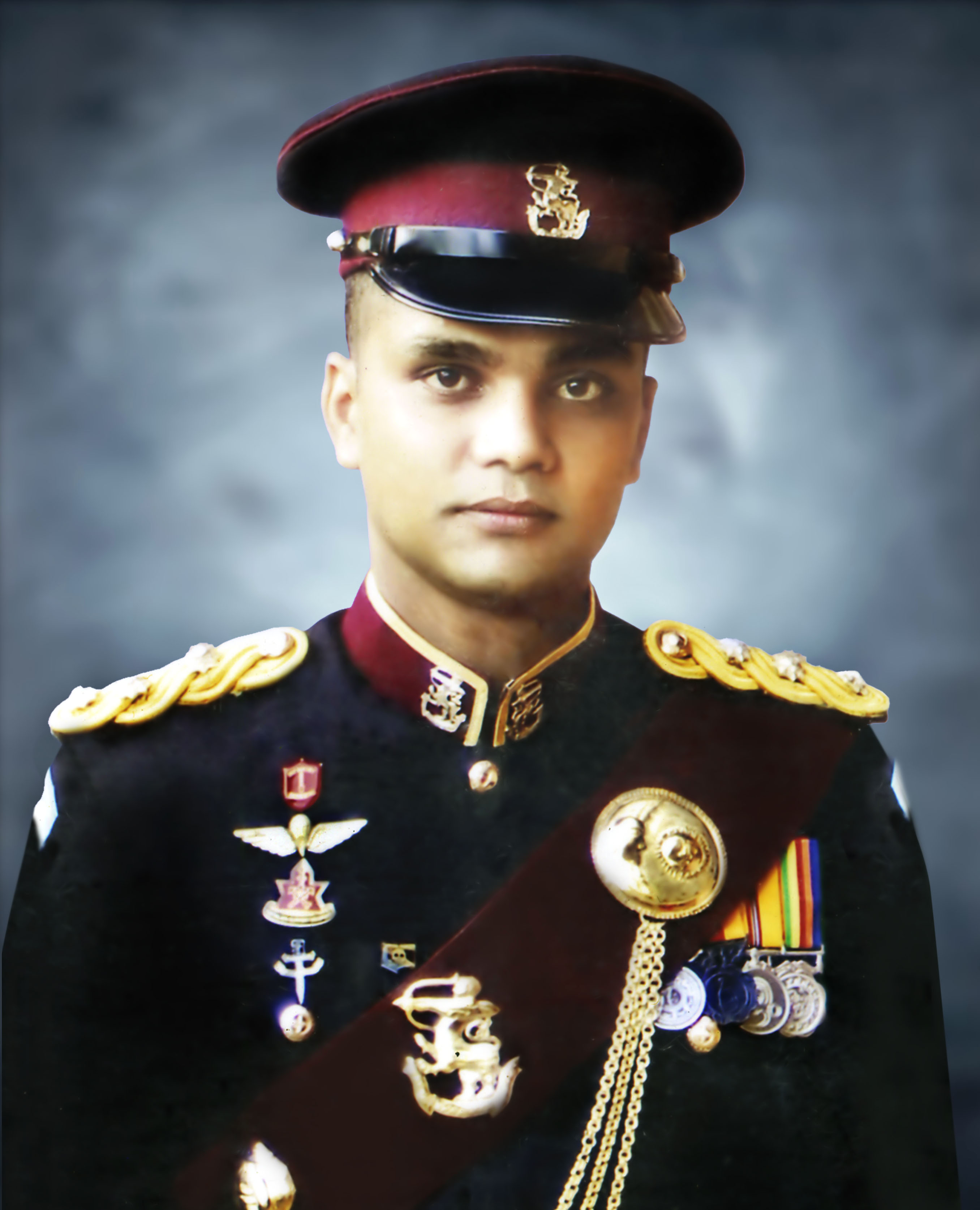
K. A. Gamage

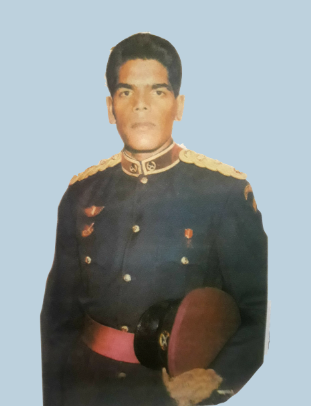
G. S. Jayanath

=== Parama Weera Vibhushanaya recipients ===
The following are SLMA graduates who received the Parama Weera Vibhushanaya, the highest decoration for valor;

- Captain Saliya Upul Aladeniya † - Sri Lanka Sinha Regiment
- Colonel A.F. Lafir † - Special Forces Regiment
- Major G. S. Jayanath † - Commando Regiment
- Major K. A. Gamage † - 1st Special Forces Regiment
- Second Lieutenant K. W. T. Nissanka † - Gajaba Regiment
- Lieutenant U. G. A. S. Samaranayake † - 9th Gemunu Watch
- Captain H. G. M. H. I. Megawarna † - 9th Gemunu Watch
- Captain G. N. Punsiri † - Gajaba Regiment
- Lieutenant W. T. Jayatillake † - Gemunu Watch
- Major W.M.I.S.B Walisundara †

== Fox Hill Super Cross ==
Fox Hill Super Cross is a cross country championship held annually at the Diyatalawa Super cross circuit at Fox Hill which is organized by Sri Lanka Military Academy. It is one of the premier motor racing events in the country.

== See also ==
- General Sir John Kotelawala Defence University
- Naval and Maritime Academy
- Air Force Academy, China Bay
- Sri Lanka Army
