= Ceylon Armed Services Long Service Medal =

- Type: Service medal
- Awarded for: Completion of 12 years of service
- Description: Suspended from a plain suspension bar
- Presented by: Sri Lanka
- Eligibility: All ranks of the regular forces of the Ceylon Army, Royal Ceylon Navy and Royal Ceylon Air Force'
- Clasps: None
- Status: Superseded by the Sri Lanka Armed Services Long Service Medal in 1972
- Established: 1968
- Final award: 1972
- Ribbon bar

Precedence
- Next (higher): Queen Elizabeth II Coronation Medal
- Next (lower): Sri Lanka Armed Services Long Service Medal

The Ceylon Armed Services Long Service Medal (Sinhala: සන්නද්ධ සේවා දීර්ඝ සේවා පදක්කම ārakśaka sēvā dhīrgha sēvā padakkama) was a service medal of Ceylon from 1968 to 1972. It was granted to all ranks of the regular forces of the Ceylon Army, Royal Ceylon Navy and Royal Ceylon Air Force provided they had completed 12 years of service. It was replaced by the Sri Lanka Armed Services Long Service Medal in 1972 when Sri Lanka became a republic.
