= Battle of Mandaitivu =

1995 Battle in the Sri Lankan Civil War

- Part of the Sri Lankan civil war
Date	28 June 1995
Location	Mandaitivu, Jaffna, Sri Lanka
Result	LTTE victory

Belligerents
Sri Lanka Army	Liberation Tigers of Tamil Eelam

Commanders and leaders
Captain Kithsiri R. Dharmawickrama †	Unknown

Units involved
10 (V) Battalion, Gemunu Watch	Sea Tigers

Strength
~150	~500

Casualties and losses
Army: 90 killed, 41 wounded, 17 missing; Civilians: 6 killed, 1 wounded	8 (LTTE claim), 75 (SLA claim)

The Battle of Mandaitivu took place during the Sri Lankan Civil War. It occurred on 28 June 1995 in which the LTTE militants attacked and overran the Sri Lanka Army detachment in the island of Mandaitivu in Jaffna.

== Background ==
Following the recapture of the island of Mandaitivu in 1990 by the Sri Lankan Armed Forces in the Operation Thrividha Balaya, the island along with Kayts remained under the control of the Government of Sri Lanka, even though much of the Jaffna peninsula was under the LTTE control. The presence of the LTTE a few miles away on the mainland continued to pose a major threat to the island which came under mortar and rocket bombardment. In 1994, the Sri Lanka Navy had withdrawn its detachment at Mandaitivu, leaving only the army detachment. In January 1995, a ceasefire was established and peace talks started between the LTTE and newly elected government of President Chandrika Kumaratunga. The ceasefire ended on 19 April 1995 with the LTTE sinking the SLNS Sooraya and SLNS Ranasuru. With the resumption of hostilities and the start of the third phase of the civil war, skirmishes broke out. In June 1995, the military camp on Mandaitivu was garrisoned by a detachment of the newly formed 10 (V) Battalion, Gemunu Watch which was a volunteer unit under the command of Captain Kithsiri R. Dharmawickrama as acting officer commanding. Calls were made to replace the frontline volunteer detachments with regular troops.

== Attack ==
Early in the morning of 28 June 1995, the LTTE launched a mortar and rocket bombardment from the Jaffna peninsula targeting the camp and thereafter a group of over 500 LTTE carders were landed on the island by the Sea Tigers using inshore patrol crafts it had captured from the navy, commenced a two wave attack on the camp defenses in the island of Mandaitivu. The attackers were able to breach the parameter and overran the isolated army detachment. Sporadic fighting continued into the night, however the LTTE had gained control of the military camp. Army command had lost communications with the camp early on in the battle. The deployment of LTTE carders on the island and presence of sea tiger craft prevented immediate reinforcements from the neighboring island of Kayts and the possible presence of LTTE MANPADSs prevented the Sri Lanka Air Force providing close air support.

== Aftermath ==
The army confirmed that 90 military personnel had been killed, 41 wounded and 17 missing who were declared missing including several officers believed to have been captured by the LTTE. LTTE confirmed that they had captured large amount of small arms, ammunition and communication equipment from the camp which they moved by boat to the mainland and suffered only eight dead.

The army claimed that the LTTE had lost 75 carders in the attack and soon after removed its Director of Military Intelligence, Brigadier Shantha Kottegoda two days later on the account of lack for warning of the attack. Captain Dharmawickrama was posthumously promoted to the rank of lieutenant colonel. The attack resulted in the army moving much of its troops from the Eastern Province to the Northern Province. Soon after the attack the LTTE launched an attack in July on Weli Oya which was effectively repulsed, having had warning from military intelligence. The Sri Lankan Armed Forces thereafter launched Operation Leap Forward in July 1995 and Operation Riviresa in November 1995, recapturing the Jaffna peninsula from the LTTE.

== See also ==
- List of Sri Lankan Civil War battles
- Battle of Janakapura
- Battle of Pooneryn
