= Portuguese conquest of Sandwip =

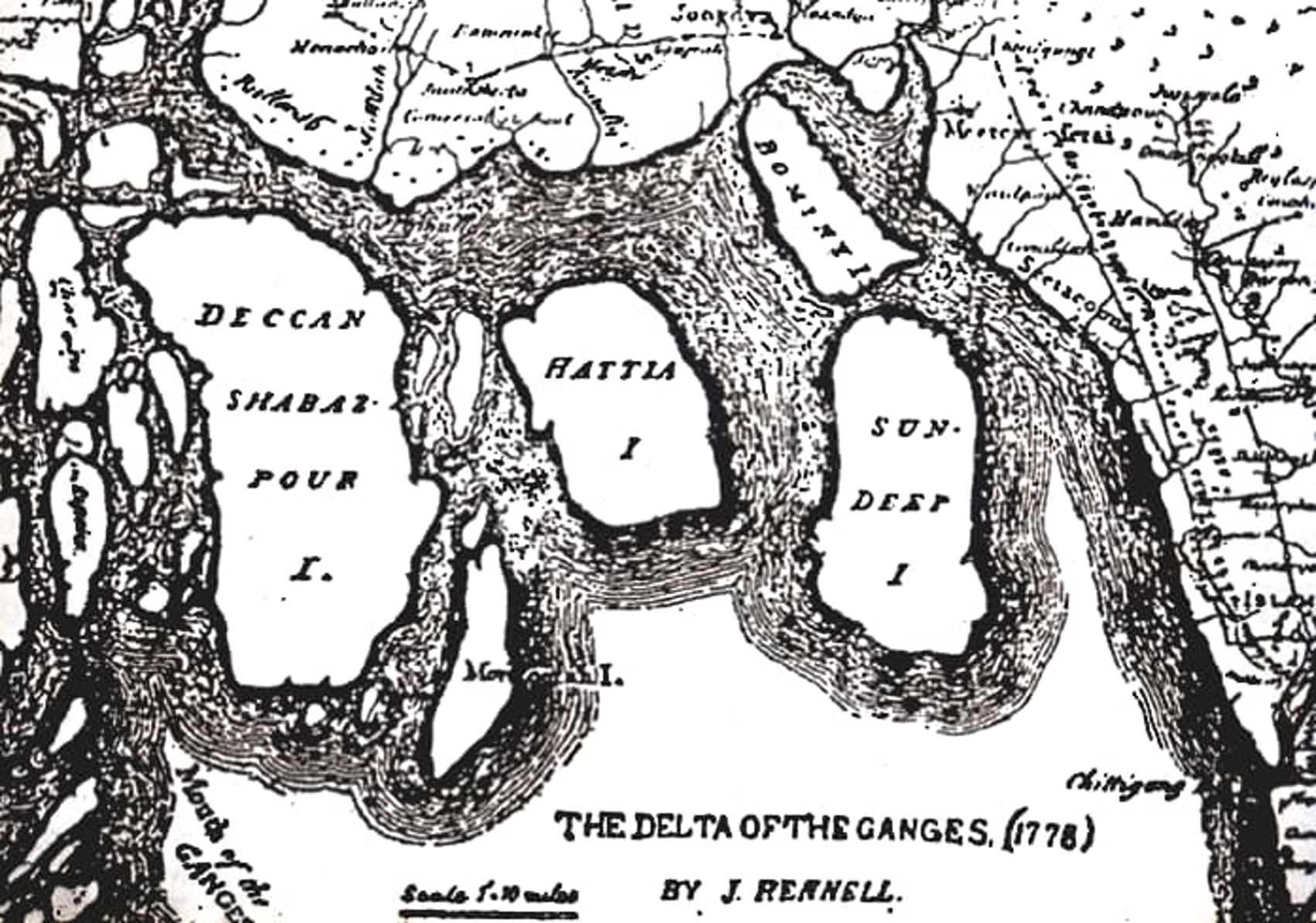
- Sandwip on a map of the delta of Ganges
Date	1607–1609
Location	Dakhin Shahbazpur and Sandwip, Bengal
Result	Portuguese victory
Territorial changes	Reestablishment of Portuguese control over Sandwip

Belligerents
Portugal; Bacala	Afghan pirates

Commanders and leaders
Sebastião Gonçalves Tibau; Sebastião Pinto †; Gaspar de Pina	Fateh Khan †; Fateh Khan's brother

Strength
80 naval personnel 10 ships 400 Portuguese >40 jalias 200 Bacala cavalry	800 naval personnel 40 ships 1,000 indigenous troops 200 Patani cavalry

Casualties and losses
Few	600 naval personnel killed >1,000 fortress defenders killed >1,000 Muslims executed

The Portuguese conquest of Sandwip was a military campaign carried out by Portuguese forces under Sebastião Gonçalves Tibau to seize control of Sandwip in the Bay of Bengal. After defeating Fateh Khan at Dakhin Shahbazpur in 1607, Gonçalves organized a campaign with the support of the king of Bacala and captured the fortress in 1609, reestablishing an independent Portuguese domain in Sandwip.

== History ==
Sebastião Gonçalves Tibau was reportedly a native of Santo Antão do Tojal who travelled to India aboard the 1605 armada. He subsequently went to Bengal and settled in Arakan, where he acquired a jalea and engaged in salt trade. He became prosperous and gained prominence among the Portuguese community in the region. After the persecution of Portuguese and Christians in Arakan towards the end of 1606, Gonçalves and the survivors fled by sea, abandoning their property. They later turned to piracy, attacking shipping and settlements along the coast of the Arakan.

Manuel de Mattos, the commander of Dianga and "lord of Sundiva" (Sandwip), was among those killed at the Dianga massacre. Before his death, Mattos had left Sandwip and his young son under the protection of Pero Gomes. Gomes was, however, regarded unfavorably by the Portuguese. In the meantime, Fateh Khan, a Muslim in Portuguese service, seized control of Sandwip from Gomes. To consolidate his power, Fateh Khan ordered the execution of all 30 Portuguese traders on the island, their families, and the indigenous Christian population. He then assembled a fleet of forty ships, crewed by Muslims and Patanis, financed by the revenues of Sandwip.

Fateh Khan believed he had a mission and prominently displayed this inscription on his flag: "Fateh Khan, by the grace of God, Lord of Sandwip, shedder of Christian blood and destroyer of the Portuguese nation." He also sought to eliminate Gonçalves and the Portuguese survivors of the Dianga massacre.

=== Battle of Shahbazpur ===
In 1607, his fleet eventually located Gonçalves and his men on Dakhin Shahbazpur, an island belonging to the king of Bacala. The Portuguese were there dividing the proceeds of approximately a year of piracy.

At the time, the commanders Gonçalves and Sebastião Pinto were disputing the division of the spoils. Pinto separated from the main group and began to depart. When he noticed Fateh Khan's forces, he opened fire, alerting Gonçalves and the other Portuguese to the attack. Gonçalves engaged with Fateh Khan's fleet in a battle that continued through the night. The Portuguese had ten ships and eighty men, while Fateh Khan had forty ships and 800 men.

The darkness made it difficult for both sides to aim effectively. At dawn, the improved visibility allowed the Portuguese artillery and musketeers to fire more accurately. Fateh Khan's galiot was boarded and captured, and its occupants were killed. After their leader's death, the crews of the remaining ships lost morale and fled towards Sandwip. Around 600 Muslims were killed, while Sebastião Pinto and a few Portuguese were killed.

=== Conquest of Sandwip ===
After the battle, the Portuguese decided to take control of Sandwip, now a leaderless domain. Filipe de Brito had proposed to the king of Portugal that Chittagong be fortified and used to bring the Portuguese operating in Bengal under the indirect control of Goa. He also proposed establishing a feitoria there to control commercial activity in the northeastern Bay of Bengal. Gonçalves, however, was acting more rapidly than the correspondence between Syriam and Lisbon.

Following their victory, the Portuguese operating along the coast regained their morale after their expulsion from Arakan. They selected Gonçalves as their leader and decided to attempt the reconquest of Sandwip, which was carried out in 1609.

Gonçalves was joined by Portuguese recruits from Bengal and other ports, many of them refugees from the persecutions of Min Razagyi. He also gained support of the king of Bacala, promising him half of Sandwip's revenues in return for assistance in the conquest. By March 1609, Gonçalves commanded more than forty jalias, a few oared ships, and 400 Portuguese, along with a contingent of troops and 200 cavalry provided by the king of Bacala.

Fateh Khan's brother had prepared the Muslim fortress on Sandwip for a Portuguese attack. However, because of the island's size, the Muslims could not determine where the Portuguese would land. A large force therefore remained outside the fortress to confront the Portuguese on the beaches. When the Portuguese established a beachhead and disembarked, the Muslims attacked them. The defenders resisted because they "expected no quarter", but the Portuguese eventually forced them to withdraw to the fortress, located three leagues inland.

The Portuguese laid siege to the fortress, but after two months, they were running short on supplies and ammunition because they were unable to maintain communications between the siege lines and their ships. The Muslims inside the fortress repeatedly conducted sorties against the Portuguese, while 1,000 indigenous soldiers and 200 Patani cavalry lay in the area between the Portuguese positions and the coast.

The desperate situation changed with the arrival of Gaspar de Pina, a Castilian captain carrying Portuguese mercenaries in the service of indigenous kings. His fleet comprised thirty musketeers and other soldiers. After landing at night, Pina and fifty men marched the three leagues to Gonçalves's position carrying supplies.

Pina, seeking to make his force appear larger than it was, ordered his men to carry several banners and torches and play trumpets and tambourines, which made the Muslims believe that a large Portuguese reinforcement had arrived. Gonçalves's and Pina's men subsequently captured the fortress and killed its defenders, numbering over 1,000.

== Aftermath ==
Before Fateh Khan's seizure of power, the inhabitants of Sandwip had lived under Portuguese rule, and after the conquest, they accepted Gonçalves as their ruler. Gonçalves promised to protect their lives and property in exchange for their assistance in bringing the remaining Muslims on the island to him. After the inhabitants returned with more than 1,000 Muslims, Gonçalves's men executed them all.

Gonçalves thus established himself as the independent ruler of Sandwip, in other words, the "king" of the island. He came into conflict with the king of Bacala rather than providing him with the promised share of Sandwip's revenues and defeated him. According to Campos, Gonçalves further controlled territory on the coast of Arakan.

Gonçalves commanded an army consisting of more than 1,000 Portuguese, 2,000 indigenous and 200 cavalry. His fleet included 20 oared ships with large falcões, 70 war jalias and 250 merchant jalias and barges, and three large oared galiots.

His growing power attracted the attention of neighboring rulers, several of whom sought alliances with him. He expanded his territory by taking the islands of Javaspur and Patelbanga from the king of Bacala, as well as other lands belonging to other rulers.

Sebastião Gonçalves Tibau had replicated what Filipe de Brito had done in Syriam, which put Min Razagyi under threat on two fronts. However, the rivalry between Sandwip and Syriam, resulting from Gonçalves' refusal to recognize Brito as his lord, prevented any cooperation between the two.

== Bibliography ==
- Saturnino Monteiro, Armando da Silva (1994). Batalhas e Combates da Marinha Portuguesa – V (1604-1625) (in Portuguese). Lisbon: Livraria Sá da Costa.
- Charney, Michael (January 1993). Arakan, Min Yazagyi, and the Portuguese: the relationship between the growth of Arakanese imperial power and Portuguese mercenaries on the fringe of mainland Southeast Asia 1517-1617 (Master's thesis). London: SOAS University of London.
- Danvers, Frederick (1894). The Portuguese In India. Vol. 2.
- Yimprasert, Suthachai (2004). "The Portuguese in Arakan in the Sixteenth and Seventeenth Centuries". Manusya, Journal of Humanities. 7 (2) 5.
