= Wanasinghe =

Wanasinghe (Sinhala: වනසිංහ, romanized: Vanasiṁha) is a Sinhalese surname. Notable people with the surname include:

- Gunaratne Wanasinghe (1948–1989), Sri Lankan political activist
- Hamilton Wanasinghe (1935–2025), Sri Lankan army general and 11th commander of the army
- Pasan Wanasinghe (born 1970), Sri Lankan cricketer
- Sanjaya Wanasinghe (born 1968), Sri Lankan army general
