= Battle of Arakan (October 1615) =

- Part of Burmese–Portuguese conflicts
- Arakan at its height, c. 1603
Date	15 October 1615
Location	Arakan River
Result	Inconclusive

Belligerents
Portugal; Sandwip	Arakan; VOC

Commanders and leaders
Francisco de Meneses Roxo	Min Khamaung

Strength
13 galiots 1 patacho	Unknowm

Casualties and losses
Heavy	Heavy

The Battle of Arakan was a naval battle fought on 15 October 1615 between the Portuguese fleet under Francisco de Meneses Roxo and the fleet of Arakan under Min Khamaung, with Dutch naval support. It was part of a campaign undertaken at the initiative of Sebastião Gonçalves Tibau, the ruler of Sandwip, and supported by the viceroy of Portuguese India, Jerónimo de Azevedo, against Arakan.

The attempt to take the city had failed. Later that same year, the Portuguese would make a second attempt.

== History ==
In 1612, King Selim Shah of Arakan died and was succeeded by his son, Mengkhamaung, who was crowned as Husain Shah. Prince Anaporum, the governor of Chittagong and a younger brother of the new king, disagreed with the succession. The two subsequently fought a battle in which Anaporum was defeated, after which he fled to Sandwip seeking assistance. Sebastião Gonçalves Tibau received the prince and married him to his daughter. Anaporum died shortly afterwards and Gonçalves seized his treasure. It was suspected that Gonçalves had been responsible for his death.

Since betraying the king of Arakan in 1613, whom he had married the niece of, Gonçalves, the ruler of Sandwip, had lived in constant fear of the king's revenge.

Husain Shah prepared to attack Sandwip again in order to take revenge on Gonçalves, but the operation was interrupted when he encountered the army of the raja of Tippera.

The Portuguese presence at Sandwip was regarded by Min Khamaung as an immediate threat to his kingdom. Min Khamaung therefore sought Dutch assistance against Gonçalves. Because the Dutch had close commercial relations with Arakan and were in no position to refuse, they agreed to assist the king by providing a fleet and military advisors.

In 1614, upon learning that a Dutch fleet was in the Arakan River and that the king of Arakan had rebuilt his fleet, Gonçalves concluded that the expected retaliation could not be far off.

To protect himself against the impending threat, he sent a ship to Goa carrying letters to the viceroy in which he offered him the fortress of Sandwip, along with an annual tribute of 3,000 candis of rice, and requested a fleet to assist him in the war against the king of Arakan. Gonçalves justified his earlier actions as retaliation for the Dianga massacre. Although Gonçalves had never recognized Portuguese sovereignty over Sandwip, he now offered to place his "kingdom" under Portuguese control in return for official assistance. To encourage the interest of D. Jerónimo de Azevedo, who was reputed to be eager for wealth, Gonçalves claimed that, by combining their fleets, they could easily capture the city of Arakan, where a fabulous treasure formerly belonging to the emperors of Pegu was supposedly kept.

At the time, the viceroy was dealing with the aftermath of the wars in northern India, as well as the war against the Persians at Hormuz, the war against the Dutch in Southeast Asia, and with the English and the Malabars along the Indian coast. Under these circumstances, it might have been expected that he would be reluctant to become involved in another war against the king of Arakan. This was not, however, what happened.

Attracted by the prospect of seizing the treasure of the emperors of Pegu and resolving the financial struggles facing the Estado da Índia, D. Jerónimo de Azevedo, despite opposition and shortages of ships and soldiers, quickly organized a fleet that departed Goa on 14 September.

Reportedly, the Portuguese crown decided to award Gonçalves the Military Order of Christ for his services at Sandwip.

The fleet, placed under the command of D. Francisco de Meneses Roxo, was initially to consist of one urca, one patacho, and fourteen galiots. The first two ships were to engage with the Dutch fleet that Gonçalves reported to be in Arakan. However, the urca did not sail because it was unseaworthy, apparently as a result of its captain's unwillingness to serve under D. Francisco de Meneses.

The original plan was for D. Francisco de Meneses's fleet to proceed first to Hugli, a settlement at the mouth of the Ganges Delta where many Portuguese adventurers lived, in order to gain their participation. The fleet would then proceed to Sandwip, where it would join Gonçalves's fleet, before launching the attack on Arakan.

However, D. Jerónimo allegedly changed the plan at the time of departure and gave D. Francisco de Meneses secret instructions to sail directly to Arakan and attempt to capture the city by surprise. A large-scale campaign would necessarily have taken time and was likely to become known to the king of Arakan, allowing him to move himself and the treasure inland. Furthermore, he was instructed not to wait for Gonçalves, as D. Jerónimo "did not sufficiently appreciate the value of the assistance to be expected of the pirate."

With favorable weather and winds, D. Francisco de Meneses reached the mouth of the Arakan River without opposition on 3 October 1615. During the voyage, the patacho separated from the fleet to pursue a vessel but ultimately failed to capture. Upon reaching the river mouth, D. Francisco sent one of his galiots to Sandwip to inform Gonçalves of his arrival. He therefore entered the Arakan River with thirteen galiots.

From there, speed was essential, since the operation depended on surprise. Instead, when D. Francisco de Meneses revealed the viceroy's instructions to his captains, they expressed their concern and pointed out the risks. Persuaded, D. Francisco proceeded cautiously upriver, gathering information from inhabitants of settlements along the banks. He remained uncertain whether to follow the viceroy's orders or his captains' advice.

More than a week passed without the Portuguese fleet covering more than half the distance to Arakan. One day, D. Francisco sent two boats upriver, carrying two soldiers, supported by a galiot. They proceeded without detecting anything until the galiot ran aground, forcing the boats to turn back and assist it.

At that point, numerous jaleas emerged from behind a river bend, having been concealed there in ambush. Remaining at a distance, the crews asked the Portuguese who they were and what they wanted. The Portuguese replied that they were Portuguese who had arrived there while fleeing from a storm. The jaleas then withdrew, and the boats and galiot returned to the fleet.

The possibility of a surprise attack was now effectively compromised. The logical course would have been to return immediately to the river mouth, or even proceed to Sandwip and join Gonçalves's fleet as soon as possible. However, Portuguese nobles were often reluctant to undertake any movements that might take them away from the enemy, even when strategically justified, because of the risk of being regarded as cowardly. D. Francisco de Meneses therefore remained at anchor in the same position.

At dawn on 15 October, the river upstream from the Portuguese fleet was filled with so many Arakanese ships that "they could not see the end of it." At the head of the fleet was a Dutch patacho, towed by two squadrons of jaleas. Around it were a large number of galiots each carrying two guns at the bow, with most of the crew armed with muskets. Some of the galiots were commanded by Dutchmen.

The captains of the twelve Portuguese galiots were not deterred by the size of the Arakanese fleet and immediately advanced against it. As was customary, the attack was poorly coordinated, with each captain primarily concerned with who would reach the enemy first. As a result, four of the galiots moved ahead of the main body of the fleet and became isolated, whereupon they were surrounded by numerous opposing galiots.

A battle ensued with cannon and musket fire, resulting in serious damage and several casualties on both sides. According to Bocarro:

…these four captains [of the galiots that had advanced ahead] were left there dead, with many blows, and many of their soldiers, yet did not cease fighting with all effort and courage, and no less did all the other ships, from which nothing could be seen but a smoke so black and thick from the gunpowder that they could scarcely make out those who were in a vessel very near, nor could anything be heard but the continual explosions of artillery and musketry, the cries and shouts of the enemies with which they sought to frighten one another, and among these also the groans of those who were dying…"

The Portuguese made use of gunpowder pots, which they threw aboard the opposing ships that came within range. Fearing the flames, the Arakanese soldiers fled toward the opposite side of their vessels, causing some galiots to capsize, while others caught fire.

When the crews of the four isolated Portuguese galiots saw their captains and many of theirs killed, they attempted to fight their way back toward the main body of the fleet. Three succeeded. The fourth, disoriented by the smoke, took the wrong course and was captured by the enemy, with all on board killed.

The battle lasted from dawn until 4 p.m., with both fleets being carried along by the river's current toward the river mouth. At this moment, the galiot that had been earlier sent to search for the patacho appeared from downstream. Having failed to find it and hearing the sound of the battle, it hastened back to join the rest of the fleet. The appearance of the ship led the Arakanese captains to fear that Portuguese reinforcements might be following it. Having already suffered many losses in ships and men, they decided to withdraw upstream.

The Portuguese fleet, also with its ships heavily damaged and filled with dead and wounded, returned to the river mouth and anchored there. The patacho joined the fleet the next day.

The attempt to capture the city of Arakan, and with it the supposed treasure of Pegu, had failed. D. Francisco de Meneses Roxo therefore decided to proceed northward in order to join Gonçalves and his fleet and, with his assistance, make a second attempt to capture the city.

== Bibliography ==
- Saturnino Monteiro, Armando da Silva (1994). Batalhas e Combates da Marinha Portuguesa – V (1604-1625) (in Portuguese). Lisbon: Livraria Sá da Costa.
- Charney, Michael (January 1993). Arakan, Min Yazagyi, and the Portuguese: the relationship between the growth of Arakanese imperial power and Portuguese mercenaries on the fringe of mainland Southeast Asia 1517-1617 (Master's thesis). London: SOAS University of London.
- Yimprasert, Suthachai (2004). "The Portuguese in Arakan in the Sixteenth and Seventeenth Centuries". Manusya, Journal of Humanities. 7 (2) 5.
