= Convention of Malvana =

1598 agreement between Portuguese and Sinhalese chiefs

The Convention of Malvana (also spelled Malwāna, Sinhala: මල්වාන ගිවිසුමෙන්ද Malwana Giwisumenda) was a 1598 agreement between the Sinhalese chiefs of Sri Lanka and the Portuguese. The convention was organised by the Portuguese General Jerónimo de Azevedo who felt as though the Sri Lankan natives did not demonstrate ample allegiance to King Philip I of Portugal. Following the 1597 death of Dharmapala of Kotte, ruler of the Kingdom of Kotte, Azevedo summoned two deputies from each Korale to a convention. The event took place on 29 September at Malwana or Colombo—the exact location has been disputed.

At the convention, Azevedo initially suggested to the deputies for the native Sri Lankan inhabitants to abandon their traditional customs, in favor of political loyalty and cultural assimilation to King Philip and Portugal. Following two days of deliberation, the deputies described their resistance to abandoning their customs. Azevedo consented to respecting the natives' way of life, including their laws and customs, provided they swear allegiance to King Philip and recognise and respect the sovereignty of the Portuguese colonial government. A group of eight representatives from the pool Sinhalese delegates, all reportedly Christian, promised their loyalty to the King of Portugal. Thome Rodrigo was present at the signing.

The convention has been widely criticised as a Portuguese attempt at providing the facade of legality and justification for their colonisation of Ceylon.
