= Santo Antão =

Santo Antão, Portuguese for "Saint Anthony", may refer to the following places.

== Brazil ==
- Vitória de Santo Antão, Pernambuco

== Cape Verde ==
- Santo Antão, Cape Verde, the northwesternmost island in Cape Verde archipelago

== Portugal ==
- Santo Antão (Évora), a civil parish in the municipality of Évora
- Santo Antão do Tojal, a civil parish in the municipality of Loures
- Santo Antão (Calheta), a civil parish in the municipality of Calheta, São Jorge, Azores
