= Battle of Arakan (November 1615) =

- Part of Burmese–Portuguese conflicts
- Arakan at its height, c. 1603
Date	18 November 1615
Location	Arakan River
Result	Inconclusive

Belligerents
Portugal; Sandwip	Arakan; VOC

Commanders and leaders
Francisco de Meneses Roxo †; Sebastião Gonçalves Tibau	Min Khamaung

Strength
14 galiots 21 fustas 48 jaleas 1 patacho	300 fustas 100 galiots 1,000 jaleas 1 Dutch patacho 1 Indian ship

Casualties and losses
~200 killed	Heavy

The Battle of Arakan was a naval battle fought on 18 November 1615 between the Portuguese fleet under Francisco de Meneses Roxo and Sebastião Gonçalves Tibau and the fleet of Arakan under Min Khamaung, with Dutch naval support. The battle followed an earlier inconclusive engagement in October and was fought along the Arakan River.

The battle ended inconclusively, and the Portuguese subsequently abandoned the campaign and returned to Sandwip.

== History ==
Following his first battle against the fleet of Min Khamaung, the king of Arakan, D. Francisco de Meneses Roxo sailed north to the port of Dianga (Porto Grande), where the Portuguese had formerly had a small fort. He remained there for about a month, treating the wounded and repairing his ships while waiting for the arrival of Sebastião Gonçalves Tibau's fleet. He sent a second galiot to inform Gonçalves of what had happened.

In mid-November the fleet arrived. It consisted of a large galiot with sixteen cannons, twenty fustas and fifty jaleas, all crewed by experienced men. Gonçalves arrived dissatisfied with the viceroy and D. Francisco de Meneses because the latter had attacked Arakan without waiting for his fleet, in accordance with the orders he had received. Nevertheless, Gonçalves and Meneses made arrangements for a second attack.

Under the new drawn up plan, the two fleets sailed to the mouth of the Arakan River, arriving at dawn on 18 November 1615. Gonçalves had brought pilots familiar with the river, allowing them to immediately proceeded upstream with the incoming tide.

The Portuguese reached the city at about 10 a.m. and found the Arakanese ships moored along the shore with their bows facing the river. The ships were connected to one another and to the shore by heavy cables, forming a defensive line armed with cannon. At the center of this formation were the Dutch patacho Duyfken and a well armed Indian ship. The main body was of approximately 300 fustas.

On each flank were positioned fifty galiots, with nearly 1,000 jaleas gathered among the stronger ships and between them and the shore. Despite the numerical advantage of his fleet, the king of Arakan sought to prevent the Portuguese from boarding his ships. A line of stakes was driven into the water in front of the fleet to prevent the Portuguese fleet from approaching. The shore was occupied by soldiers and artillery so that they could fire over the fleet.

Gonçalves transferred half of his fleet to D. Francisco de Meneses and received half of his fleet in return. The Portuguese force was divided into two equal squadrons, each consisting of seven galiots, ten fustas, and twenty jaleas. The patacho, towed by a fusta and eight jaleas, operated independently.

Meneses's squadron sailed at the front of the fleet, then that of Gonçalves, and then the patacho. The Portuguese supposedly proceeded in column along the middle of the river, passing the Arakanese line outside of its range. The Portuguese commanders' plan was to sail as far upstream as possible with the incoming tide and then attack the Arakanese fleet from upstream, using the current to their advantage.

However, when the tide began to ebb, Meneses's ship had advanced only slightly beyond the center of the enemy line. Unable to proceed further, Meneses gave the signal to attack, which then Portuguese vessels turned toward the opposing fleet and advanced in line, accompanied by drums, trumpets, fifes and shouts.

The stakes prevented the Portuguese ships from grappling with the Arakanese fleet as they wished. They were forced to remain in front of the opposing line and exchange artillery and musket fire at close range. The distance was also such that the Portuguese were unable to use their gunpowder pots.

Because of the arrangement of the Arakanese fleet, only those ships directly facing Portuguese vessels could participate in the battle. The remainder were restricted by the stakes, which limited the numerical advantage of Arakan. As a result, only 34 ships had the possibility to combat with the 34 Portuguese ships that were in front of them.

In the ship-to-ship combat, the Portuguese possessed advantage in artillery and experience. The Arakanese engaged with the Portuguese began to suffer heavy casualties, and some of their garrison members fled ashore. The king ordered that men fleeing to shore be killed and their heads displayed on spears to prevent further desertions. Nevertheless, it did not prevent much.

However, none of the Arakanese ships were burned or captured, because the stakes prevented the Portuguese from reaching them. This meant that despite the casualties, their fleet remained largely intact materially. The Portuguese fleet eventually drifted downstream of the Arakanese position and anchored some distance away to treat the wounded and allow the crew to eat under the blazing sun.

Realizing that continuing the battle with his ships immobilized was untenable, the king of Arakan ordered part of the stakes removed to allow the fleet to pass and had the vessels soaked with water and mud. Shortly after noon, the fleet advanced downstream against the Portuguese.

The Portuguese took up arms and advanced to meet the Arakanese while maintaining their organization. Gonçalves's squadron attacked one of the Arakanese squadrons composed mainly of fustas, while Meneses's squadron engaged another, which was smaller but stronger composed of galiots. The patacho, towed by the fusta and jaleas, advanced against the Dutch patacho, likewise towed by numerous jaleas.

According to Bocarro:

"They all charged at one another with a tremendous crash, and the first to show an advantage was Sebastião Gonçalves with his squadron, overcoming that of the enemy and putting it to flight; yet he did not cease pursuing it to shatter it completely. Our pinnace charged against that of the Dutch and made it flee onto some shallows, where the jaleas it had in tow pulled it away with great speed. The other squadron that charged against the captain-major, which was larger and composed of bigger vessels… This battle lasted until almost sunset, with us getting the upper hand on all sides until then…"

The course of the battle changed when D. Francisco de Meneses was killed after being struck in the head by two arquebus shots. His soldiers lowered the banner of Christ, causing the Portuguese attack to lose momentum. The rest of Meneses's squadron began withdrawing downstream, believing the battle to be over. The Arakanese then counterattacked and placed some of the Portuguese ships in difficulty. One Portuguese galiot, commanded by Gaspar de Abreu, was abandoned after everyone aboard had been killed. Abreu was saved by Antonio Carvalho but, mortally wounded, died several days later.

Gonçalves abandoned his pursuit and returned to determine what had happened, but his galiot drifted onto the stakes and became trapped. Several Arakanese galiots attacked it, but the soldiers resisted the attack until the jaleas were able to tow the vessel free.

The Portuguese regrouped and sailed toward the mouth of the river, while the Arakanese returned to the city. Like the previous encounter, the battle ended inconclusively, with the Arakanese suffering heavier casualties. Those who were captured by the Arakanese were executed and their heads displayed along the shore.

The Portuguese paused at the river mouth to bury approximately 200 Portuguese dead at sea. That same night, the fidalgos elected D. Luís de Azevedo to succeed D. Francisco de Meneses as captain-major. The next day, several jaleas were sent upriver to determine the disposition of the Arakanese forces. They returned that evening informing that the Arakanese ships were anchored or beached near the city, showing no apparent intention of resuming combat. The Portuguese then agreed to end the campaign and sail to Sandwip.

At Sandwip, Gonçalves attempted to convince D. Luís de Azevedo to winter there with his fleet, anticipating a retaliation from the king of Arakan. The soldiers, however, unwilling to remain, decided to return to India with Luís de Azevedo, departing on 23 January 1616.

Many of Gonçalves's soldiers joined Luís de Azevedo's fleet, leaving him with a smaller force to defend Sandwip. Many months later, upon learning that the king of Arakan was approaching Sandwip with a large fleet, Gonçalves abandoned the island and took refuge in Hugli, dying there in 1617.

== Bibliography ==
- Saturnino Monteiro, Armando da Silva (1994). Batalhas e Combates da Marinha Portuguesa – V (1604-1625) (in Portuguese). Lisbon: Livraria Sá da Costa.
- Danvers, Frederick (1894). The Portuguese In India. Vol. 2.
- Charney, Michael (January 1993). Arakan, Min Yazagyi, and the Portuguese: the relationship between the growth of Arakanese imperial power and Portuguese mercenaries on the fringe of mainland Southeast Asia 1517-1617 (Master's thesis). London: SOAS University of London.
