= Sanjaya Wanasinghe =

Sri Lankan general

Major General Sanjaya Wanasinghe RSP, VSV, USP, VSP
- Born: October 13, 1968 (age 58)
- Relatives: General Hamilton Wanasinghe (Father)
- Military career
- Allegiance: Sri Lanka
- Branch: Sri Lanka Army
- Service years: 1987–2023
- Rank: Major General
- Unit: Sri Lanka Artillery
- Commands: Chief of Staff of the Sri Lanka Army, Deputy Chief of Staff of the Sri Lanka Army, Sri Lanka Army Volunteer Force, Security Forces Headquarters – Mullaitivu, 61 Infantry Division
- Awards: Rana Sura Padakkama, Vishista Seva Vibhushanaya, Uttama Seva Padakkama, Videsha Seva Padakkama

Major General Sanjaya Wanasinghe RSP, VSV, USP, VSP (born 13 October 1968) is a retired general of the Sri Lanka Army. He served as the Chief of Staff of the Sri Lanka Army, having served as the Deputy Chief of Staff of the Army, Commandant of the Volunteer Force and Commander, Security Forces Headquarters – Mullaitivu. He was the Colonel Commandant of the Sri Lanka Artillery.

== Early life and education ==
Born on 13 October 1968 to Captain (later General) Hamilton Wanasinghe and Ira Beatrice Jayathillake, Wanasinghe was educated at Ananda College.

== Military career ==
Wanasinghe joined the Sri Lanka Army as an officer cadet on 16 March 1987 and underwent his officer training at the Sri Lanka Military Academy. He was commissioned into the 4th Field Regiment, Sri Lanka Artillery, on 10 December 1988 when his father Lieutenant General Hamilton Wanasinghe was the 11th Commander of the Army (1988–1991).

Sanjaya Wanasinghe served as the Troop Commander of 4 Sri Lanka Artillery (4 SLA), he was the Adjutant of Marksmanship and Sniper Training School (MSTS), he was appointed as the General Staff Officer 3 (Operations) and Brigade Major of 26 Infantry Brigade, he also served as the Second-in-Command of 14 Sri Lanka Artillery (14 SLA), Staff Officer 2 (Admin) at the Directorate of Army Medical Services at the Army Headquarters, he was the Officer Commanding of Sri Lanka Telecom Detachment and the Officiating General Staff Officer 1 (Coordinating) of 21 Infantry Division, he was the Commanding Officer of MSTS, he was Colonel General Staff of 59 Infantry Division, he commanded 682 Infantry Brigade and the 144 Infantry Brigade.

He was the General Officer Commanding (GOC) of the 61 Infantry Division.

He served as the Director General of Directorate of Overseas Operations. He was promoted to Major General on 2 June 2020. He also served as Adjutant General of Sri Lanka Army. He retired on 15 October 2023 from the army.
