= Hamilton Wanasinghe =

Sri Lankan army general (1933–2025)

General Hamilton Wanasinghe හැමිල්ටන් වනසිංහ VSV
- Born: 18 August 1933; Malwana, British Ceylon (now Sri Lanka)
- Died: 13 June 2025 (aged 91); Narahenpita, Sri Lanka
- Education: Royal Military Academy, Sandhurst, Ananda College
- Spouse: Ira Beatrice Jayathillake
- Children: Juthika Wanasinghe, Dharshika Wanasinghe, Sanjaya Wanasinghe, Shashika Wanasinghe, Diluka Wanasinghe
- Military career
- Allegiance: Sri Lanka
- Branch: Sri Lanka Army
- Service years: 1954–1995
- Rank: General
- Unit: Sri Lanka Artillery
- Commands: Commander of the Sri Lankan Army General Officer Commanding – Joint Operations Command and Secretary Defence
- Conflicts: Second JVP Insurrection; Sri Lankan Civil War
- Awards: Vishista Seva Vibhushanaya

General Hamilton Wanasinghe, VSV (18 August 1933 – 13 June 2025) was a Sri Lankan army officer. He served as the 11th commander of the Sri Lankan Army (1988–1991), third general officer commanding (GOC) of the Joint Operations Headquarters (JOH; later known as the chief of the Defence Staff; 1991–1993) and also as defence secretary.

== Early life ==
Hamilton Wanasinghe was born in Malwana, a suburb of Colombo. He received his primary and secondary education at Ananda College. A keen sportsman, he was the sergeant major in the college cadet platoon. He was an active member of the college rifle shooting team, which won many coveted trophies and then later, he joined the army. Wanasinghe also represented Ceylon in the Inter Dominion small bore rifle shooting competition.

== Military career ==
=== Early career ===
Wanasinghe joined the Ceylon Army as an officer cadet in 1954 and was sent to the Royal Military Academy Sandhurst for officer training. On completing his training he was commissioned as second lieutenant in the Ceylon Artillery in 1955. He was a captain in the 3rd Field Artillery Regiment when the 1962 attempted coup took place. Many of the officers of the three regiments of the Ceylon Artillery were implicated, and Wanasinghe gave evidence in the Trial-at-Bar of the accused that followed. He was transferred to the 4th Field Artillery Regiment following the amalgamation of the 1st Light Anti-Aircraft Regiment and the 3rd Field Artillery Regiment in 1963. He went on to serve as the commanding officer of the 4th Field Artillery Regiment with the rank of lieutenant colonel from May 1979 to 1981.

=== Higher command ===
Promoted to colonel, he served as commander, Task Force 4 Northern Command in Jaffna from January 1981 to December 1981. In 1982 he attended the National Defence College, India and on his return he was promoted to the rank of brigadier and appointed the first commander of Security Force Command Jaffna in 1985. Promoted to major general, he served as the first colonel commandant, Sri Lanka Artillery, from September 1985 to March 1988 and thereafter served as the commandant of the Volunteer Force.

=== Army commander ===
Wanasinghe was appointed Army commander on 15 August 1988 and served until 15 November 1991, and was promoted to the rank of lieutenant general. When Wanasinghe took command, the army was engaged in subduing the 2nd JVP insurrection in the south of the island, while the Indian Peace Keeping Force (IPKF) was present in the North and East of Sri Lanka. Wanasinghe had the unprecedented task of maintaining cordial relations in a turbulent period. During his tenure, he expanded the army and raised a number of new units, including special forces and established its sniper school. The army was able to crush the JVP leadership and insurrection completely, while also recapturing the Eastern Province and allowing elections to be held there. The army carried out several major operations in the Northern Province, including Operation Balavegaya to relieve the siege of Elephant Pass Army base through an amphibious operation and established a beachhead at Vettalikerni to reach Elephant Pass camp. Lt. General Hamilton Wanasinghe, as the commander of the Army, risked his own life and was present at the Elephant Pass rescue, Operation Balawegaya, along with Major General Denzil Kobbekaduwa and Task Force Commander Brigadier Vijaya Wimalaratne. Operation Balavegaya was launched in June 1991 with the assistance of the Sri Lanka Navy with an amphibious landing at Vetterlerkani, which LTTE leader called the "Mother of All Battles". Victorious Sri Lanka Army troops broke the LTTE siege at Elephant Pass.

=== Joint Operations Headquarters ===
On relinquishment of the command of the Army on 15 November 1991, Wanasinghe was promoted to the rank of general. He was appointed the general officer commanding (GOC) of the Joint Operations Headquarters (JOH), serving from 1991 to 1993.

== Ministry of Defence ==
Wanasinghe was appointed permanent secretary of the Ministry of Defence on 6 June 1993, from which position he retired in February 1995. He had the rare distinction of holding all three key appointments of the Sri Lanka's Defence establishment at a time country faced southern JVP insurrection and LTTE Second Eelam War. In November 1993 General Hamilton Wanasinghe facilitated the relief operation during the Battle of Pooneryn with an amphibious landing of Army troops assisted by the Navy.

== Personal life and death ==
Wanasinghe married Ira Beatrice Jayathillake, daughter of Wanasinghe Arachchige Elaris Perera Jayathillake Ralahamy, a close relative in 1960. Ira Wanasinghe was a school teacher, and they had five children. His son Sanjaya Wanasinghe was commissioned as a second lieutenant in the Sri Lanka Artillery when Wanasinghe was the Army commander; Sanjaya retired as a major general in 2023.

Two of Hamilton Wanasinghe's nephews were killed in action serving in the Sri Lanka Artillery in 1993; Captain Nalin Jayatilleke (his wife's brother's son) was killed serving as a forward observation officer in Jaffna and Major Panduka Wanasinghe (his elder brother's son) was killed in the Battle of Pooneryn. His son-in-law (and a nephew), Brigadier Bhathiya Jayatilleka, was killed in 2000 during the Second Battle of Elephant Pass.

Wanasinghe died in Narahenpita, Sri Lanka on 13 June 2025, at the age of 91. At the time of his death, he had been receiving treatment at the Army Hospital in Narahenpita.

On 15 June, his funeral was held at the New Crematorium of the Kanatte Cemetery, in Borella, with full military honours.

== Honours ==
Wanasinghe had been awarded the Vishista Seva Vibhushanaya (VSV) for distinguished service in the army, his other medals include the Purna Bhumi Padakkama, Vadamarachchi Operation Medal, Sri Lanka Armed Services Long Service Medal, Ceylon Armed Services Long Service Medal, Republic of Sri Lanka Armed Services Medal and the President's Inauguration Medal.

In 2019, a road in between his hometown Malwana and Dompe was named General Hamilton Wanasinghe Mawatha.

== See also ==
- List of Sri Lankan non-career Permanent Secretaries

Military offices
Preceded by Nalin Seneviratne	Commander of the Sri Lankan Army; 1988–1991	Succeeded by Cecil Waidyaratne
