= Battle of Janakapura =

- Part of the Sri Lankan civil war
Date	25 July 1993
Location	Janakapura, Weli Oya, Sri Lanka
Result	LTTE victory

Belligerents
Military of Sri Lanka	Liberation Tigers of Tamil Eelam

Commanders and leaders
Lt. Gen. Cecil Waidyaratne; Brig. Parry Liyanage	Velupillai Prabhakaran

Casualties and losses
24 soldiers killed 9 civilians killed 31 wounded 20 missing	Unknown

The Battle of Janakapura, was a battle between the militant Liberation Tigers of Tamil Eelam (LTTE or Tamil Tigers) and the Sri Lanka Army during the Sri Lankan Civil War for control of the military camp at Janakapura in Weli Oya in northern Sri Lanka on 25 July 1993.

== Background ==
The LTTE launched a surprise attack, on the government controlled area of Weli Oya, aimed at overrunning army detachment at Janakapura with its main camp in Janakapura and three other satellite camps in the area. The detachment consisted of approx. 150 military personnel and came under the 6th "Weli Oya" Brigade under the command of Brigadier Parry Liyanage.

== Attack ==
A force of 250 to 500 LTTE cadres attacked the Janakapura army camp at midnight on 25 July 1993, following several diversionary attacks on other army detachments at Kokkutoduwai and Kovil Point. At the time of the attack 75 soldiers had been deployed on an ambush patrol outside the camp in two groups. Facing superior numbers, these two patrols avoided engaging the attacking force of the LTTE. The LTTE was able to overrun the camp after attacking it with RPGs. After capturing the camp the LTTE secured weapons, ammunition, equipment, and used army bulldozers to flatten the camp.

=== Killing of civilians and prisoners ===
LTTE cadres also attacked the village adjoining the camp killing 9 civilians including women and children by means of shooting, knifing and grenades as a warning to the Sinhalese population in Weli Oya. LTTE also appears to have executed military personnel they had captured in the attack and later exhibited 18 bodies. The LTTE killed the captured signals officer of the camp, Captain Wijenayake with a mammoty and took his eyes out, which was witnessed by a signaler who was also taken prisoner and later interrogated with torture by the LTTE to gain classified radio signal codes used by the Sri Lanka Signals Corps. He was held as a prisoner for five years.

== Aftermath ==
The army had suffered 24 killed, 20 missing and 31 wounded in addition to the loss of Rs 50 million worth of weaponry and equipment, which the LTTE removed from the camp. 14 soldiers including a captain had escaped the camp as it was overrun. The LTTE handed over civilians and ashes supposedly of soldiers to the ICRC a few days later. 130 families fled the village. Having been called the greatest defeat faced by the army to that point in the Sri Lankan Civil War, the Prime Minister Ranil Wickremasinghe questioned the incident at the National Security Council and the President D. B. Wijetunga expressed his displeasure of how the army had handled the matter. The Army Commander Lieutenant General Cecil Waidyaratne deflected blame to the Joint Operations Command which handled strategy and deployment of troops and Brigadier Parry Liyanage claimed that he lacked civilian cooperation and local intelligence. A Court of inquiry by the army found there had been gross negligence at all levels in the field. In November 1993, the LTTE launched a massive attack on Pooneryn with weapons it captured from Janakapura which lead to the deaths of over 200 army personnel and General Waidyaratne retired in December 1993. The army camp at Janakapura was reestablished and was again targeted by the LTTE in the Battle of Weli Oya in July 1995, where LTTE suffered major casualties.

== See also ==
- List of Sri Lankan Civil War battles
- Battle of Pooneryn
- Battle of Mullaitivu (1996)
- Battle of Weli Oya (1995)
