= Nuno Álvares Pereira (governor) =

5th Governor of Portuguese Ceylon
- In office 1616–1618
- Monarch: Philip II of Portugal
- Preceded by: Manuel Mascarenhas Homem
- Succeeded by: Constantino de Sá de Noronha

Nuno Álvares Pereira was the 5th Governor of Portuguese Ceylon. de Meneses was appointed in 1616 under Philip II of Portugal, he was Governor until 1618. He was succeeded by Constantino de Sá de Noronha.

Government offices
Preceded by Manuel Mascarenhas Homem	Governor of Portuguese Ceylon; 1616–1618	Succeeded by Constantino de Sá de Noronha
