= Mandaithivu sea massacre =

Mandaithivu massacre
- Location of Northern Province, Sri Lanka
- Location: Off Mandaitivu coast, Jaffna District, Northern Province, Sri Lanka
- Date: 10 June 1986 (+8 GMT)
- Target: Sri Lankan Tamil Civilians
- Deaths: 33
- Perpetrator: Sri Lankan Navy

Mandaithivu sea massacre was a civilian massacre of ethnic Tamils by members of the Sri Lankan Navy off the coast of Mandaitivu island of the Jaffna Peninsula. 33 civilians, all of them fishermen mostly from Gurunagar, who had been fishing at sea were attacked, tortured and murdered by Sri Lankan Navy personnel on 10 June 1986.

== Massacre ==
Mandaitivu is an islet situated off the Jaffna peninsula and is connected to the city of Jaffna by means of a causeway.

On 10 June 1986, Sri Lankan Navy personnel clad in black clothes approached a group of fishermen who were in the sea. The fishermen raised their hands to show they were civilians. The Navy however began to attack the fishermen and destroying their boats and nets. All of the fishermen were tortured and brutally murdered. The eyes of some fishermen were gouged out. Stomachs of some fishermen were cut open. In all 32 fishermen from Gurunagar and one from Mandaitivu village were killed by the Navy. Semon Mariyathas (41), the only fisherman who escaped death in the massacre is still alive. The fishermen who were massacred were aged between 13 and 62. According to the medical evidence led at the inquest, all the fishermen had died of multiple injuries to various parts of their anatomy due to machine gunfire.

== Remembrance Day ==
10 June is observed as a remembrance day in the peninsula. A monument in remembrance of those dead was opened coinciding with the incident's 18th anniversary in 2004. A previous such memorial was destroyed by the Sri Lankan Army during a 'military operation' in 1996.

== See also ==
- Kumudini boat massacre another massacre of Sri Lankan Tamils by the Sri Lankan Navy
- List of civilian massacres attributed to Sri Lankan government forces
