= Cecil Waidyaratne =

Sri Lankan general

General Cecil Waidyaratne සිසිල් වෛද්‍යරත්න VSV, USP
- Born: June 16, 1938; Ceylon
- Died: December 18, 2001 (aged 63); India
- Military career
- Allegiance: Sri Lanka
- Branch: Sri Lanka Army
- Service years: 1961–94
- Rank: General
- Unit: Sri Lanka Armoured Corps
- Commands: Commander of the Sri Lankan Army; Chief of Staff of the Army; Operation Combine; 1 Division
- Conflicts: 1971 JVP insurrection 1987–89 JVP Insurrection; Sri Lankan Civil War
- Awards: Vishista Seva Vibhushanaya; Uttama Seva Padakkama
- Other work: Sri Lankan Ambassador to Thailand

General L. D. E. Cecil Waidyaratne, VSV, USP (16 May 1938 – 18 December 2001) was a Sri Lanka Army general. He was 12th Commander of the Sri Lankan Army and a former Sri Lankan Ambassador to Thailand.

== Education ==
Educated at St. Benedict's College, Colombo, where he played for the college cricket team.

== Military career ==
=== Early career ===
Waidyaratne joined the Ceylon Army on 26 June 1959, as a cadet officer and received his officer training at the Royal Military Academy, Sandhurst. On 28 July 1961, he was commissioned as a second lieutenant in the 1st Reconnaissance Regiment, Ceylon Armoured Corps. He served with the 1st Reconnaissance Regiment during the 1971 JVP insurrection and in 1973, he attended the Defence Services Staff College in Wellington gaining his psc qualification.

=== Field command ===
On January 1, 1980, he was promoted to the rank of lieutenant colonel and was appointed commanding officer of the Sri Lanka Electrical and Mechanical Engineers when fraud and robbery was reported in army workshops. In March 1981, he was appointed commanding officer of the 1st Battalion, Sri Lanka Sinha Regiment and tasked with undertaking disciplinary action following a clash between Sinha Regiment troops and police officers of the Fort Police Station on 20 January that year. He was thereafter appointed commanding officer of the 1st Reconnaissance Regiment, Sri Lanka Armoured Corps from July 1982 to June 1983. In May 1983, he was then sent to take control of what the army command thought of a possible mutiny in the Rajarata Rifles. Taking command of the Rajarata Rifles, Colonel Waidyaratne had it disbanded, retrained and merged its remaining officers and men with that of the Vijayabahu Infantry Regiment in October 1983 to form the Gajaba Regiment under the command of Lieutenant Colonel Vijaya Wimalaratne.

=== Higher command ===
In 1985, he became the Commander Northern Area and thereafter Commander Southern Area before becoming the General Officer Commanding, 1 Division. In 1988, he attended the National Security and Strategic Study course at the National Defence College, India. In 1989, he was promoted to the rank of major general and appointed Chief of Staff of the Army. In August 1989, amidst of the second JVP insurrection in the southern parts of the island, Waidyaratne was appointed concurrently as the Commander of Operation Combine with responsibility for the security of Colombo Metropolitan area. He led the Operation Combine to systematically suppress the military branch of the JVP, the DJP with brutal counter-insurgency operations which led to the end of the second JVP insurrection following the death of its leader Rohana Wijeweera in November 1989.

=== Commander of the Sri Lankan Army ===
On 16 November 1991, he was promoted to lieutenant general and was appointed Commander of the Sri Lanka Army. Taking command of the army during the Eelam War II phase of the Sri Lankan Civil War, Waidyaratne introduced a program of re-training and re-equipping to face the conventional warfare tactics adopted by the LTTE with the First Battle of Elephant Pass. He proposed a long term strategy to defeat the LTTE aimed at defeating the LTTE in the Eastern Province and thereafter bringing overwhelming force to bear on LTTE controlled areas in the Northern Province. However, the LTTE was able to keep the army on the defensive by ambushing its patrols and launching attacks on isolated detachments like in the case of the Battle of Janakapura and the Battle of Pooneryn. Following Pooneryn, Waidyaratne resigned on 31 December 1993, and was promoted to General on 1 January 1994 and retired from the army. He was succeeded by Major General G. H. De Silva.

=== Strategic approach and legacy ===
As Army Commander of the Sri Lanka Army from 1991 until his retirement in December 1993, Waidyaratne pressed for a strategic re-orientation of Sri Lanka’s internal-conflict posture. At a time when the army had suffered a string of setbacks, he emphasised the need for a “comprehensive mechanism” to defeat the terrorist threat rather than incremental adjustments.

One of his most notable proposals was to expand the navy rather than solely build up the army, on the basis that in the island-context of Sri Lanka the maritime dimension offered a critical and under-exploited lever in the campaign. According to contemporary commentary, his argument was that the armed forces had over-relied on land forces, while the insurgents exploited the littoral environment and maritime supply-routes.

Although Waidyaratne did not himself oversee the full implementation of this naval shift, his strategic recommendation has been credited by analysts as influencing subsequent commanders (notably Sarath Fonseka) and contributing to the eventual success of the government campaign in the late-1990s and early 2000s.

== Honors ==
He had been awarded the Vishista Seva Vibhushanaya (VSV) for distinguished service, his other medals include the Sri Lanka Army 25th Anniversary Medal, Ceylon Armed Services Long Service Medal, Sri Lanka Armed Services Long Service Medal, President's Inauguration Medal, Purna Bhumi Padakkama.

== Later life ==
Following his retirement he was appointed Sri Lankan Ambassador to Thailand and held the post till December 1994. He died on 18 December 2001, while undergoing medical treatment in India.

== Family ==
He married Thillaka Jayewardene daughter of Major T. F. Jayewardene. T.F Jayewardene who was born to Colonel T. G. Jayewardene and Lena Jayewardene née Attygalle, daughter of Mudaliyar Don Charles Gemoris Attygalle, Jayewardene was related to three major political families that would play a significant role in the pre- and post-Independence era of Ceylon. His cousins Sir John Kotelawala and Dudley Senanayake, became Prime Ministers and Junius Richard Jayewardene became the President of Sri Lanka.

Cecil and Thillaka Waidyaratne had two children, Ruwan and Niroshini.

Military offices
Preceded by Hamilton Wanasinghe	Commander of the Sri Lankan Army; 1991–93	Succeeded by G. H. De Silva
