= Manuel Mascarenhas Homem (governor) =

Portuguese colonial administrator

4th Governor of Portuguese Ceylon
- In office 1614–1616
- Monarch: Philip II of Portugal
- Preceded by: Francisco de Meneses
- Succeeded by: Nuno Álvares Pereira

Manuel Mascarenhas Homem was a colonial governor. He was appointed in under Philip II of Portugal, Governor of Pernambuco between 1596 and 1605. In 1614, he was the Governor of Portuguese Ceylon, serving until 1616 and being succeeded by Nuno Álvares Pereira.

Government offices
| Preceded by Francisco de Meneses | Governor of Portuguese Ceylon; 1614–1616 | Succeeded by Nuno Álvares Pereira |
