= 61 Division (Sri Lanka) =

Division of the Sri Lanka Army

- 61 Division flag
- Active: 5 May 2008 – present
- Country: Sri Lanka
- Branch: Sri Lanka Army
- Size: 21,729
- Part of: Security Forces Headquarters – West
- Garrison/HQ: Boossa, Southern Province

Commanders
- Current commander: Major General D G Hewage Rsp

The 61 Division is a division of the Sri Lanka Army. Established on 5 May 2008, the division is currently based in Boossa in the Southern Province. The division is a part of Security Forces Headquarters – West and has three brigades and six battalions. Major General D G Hewage Rsp has been commander of the division since January 2021. The division is responsible for 1,448 square kilometres (559 sq mi) of territory.

== Organisation ==
The division is currently organised as follows:

- 611 Brigade
  - 8th Battalion, Sri Lanka Sinha Regiment
  - 8th Battalion, Sri Lanka Gemunu Watch
- 612 Brigade
  - 12 Field Engineer Regiment, Sri Lanka Engineers
  - 1 st Battalion, Sri Lanka Pioneer Corps
- 613 Brigade
  - 3rd Battalion, Sri Lanka Gemunu Watch
  - 14th Battalion, Sri Lanka Gemunu Watch
