= Operation Riviresa =

1995 Sri Lankan military operation

- Part of Sri Lankan Civil War
Date	17 November – 5 December 1995 (18 days)
Location	Jaffna, Sri Lanka
Result	Sri Lankan military victory

Belligerents
Sri Lanka Army Sri Lanka Navy	Liberation Tigers of Tamil Eelam

Commanders and leaders
Major General (later General) Rohan Daluwatte; Brigadier (later Major General) Janaka Perera; Brigadier Neil Dias; Brigadier P.A. Karunathilaka; Commodore H.R Amaraweera - Northern Naval Area Commander	Velupillai Prabhakaran

Strength
25,000	3,000

Casualties and losses
500+ Killed & 650 Wounded	438 Killed [LTTE claimed]

Operation Riviresa (Operation Sunrays) was a combined military operation launched by the Sri Lankan Armed Forces in Jaffna. Starting on 17 October 1995, the primary objective of the operation was the capture of the city of Jaffna and rest of the Jaffna Peninsula from the LTTE (the Liberation Tigers of Tamil Eelam, better known as the Tamil Tigers). It is believed that Operation Riviresa was the largest and most successful military operation in Sri Lankan Armed Forces during the Third Eelam War.

== Background ==
During the mid-1990s, the primary objective of the Sri Lankan military was to take control of the Jaffna Peninsula and establish a link between the Jaffna and Kilinochchi Districts to maintain a land route from the south. This period saw rapid changes in Sri Lanka’s political landscape, including a significant shift in military strategy following the government change in 1995. The administration of President Chandrika Bandaranaike Kumaratunga decided to engage in peace negotiations with the LTTE, which continued for several months.

By late March 1995, it became evident that the peace negotiations were not progressing, and state intelligence grew skeptical of the LTTE's motives. The first act of hostilities by the LTTE, which ended the peace talks, was an attack on the Sri Lankan naval fleet in Trincomalee Dockyard in April 1995. Following this, military installations in the north came under repeated attacks by the LTTE. The Sri Lankan Air Force faced constant threats, and several aircraft were downed by LTTE-deployed surface-to-air missiles, used for the first time in the conflict. As a result, the Air Force had to adopt evasive maneuvers when landing and taking off from Pallai Air Force Base, significantly hindering air movement and the transport of critical cargo and personnel to the north.

Simultaneously, the Sri Lankan Navy convoys in the northern seas and the only port in the northern theater, Kankesanthurai (KKS), were under constant attack by LTTE suicide cadres and boats. The Navy played a crucial role in ensuring uninterrupted supplies and logistics, transporting troops, ammunition, military hardware, rations, and provisions to the entire northern theater. Despite not controlling the Jaffna Peninsula, the Sri Lankan government remained responsible for providing essentials and services to the civilian population there, primarily through the Government Agent, a post that functioned throughout the conflict. The Navy was tasked with providing safe passage for the Ceylon Shipping Corporation and private merchant vessels reaching KKS with essential goods.

In this context, an offensive operation was necessary to take control of the Jaffna Peninsula. The Army decided to launch Operation Riviresa under the Overall Operations Commander, General Rohan Daluwatte. However, the window of opportunity was closing due to the incoming monsoon season from October to December. The Sri Lankan Army’s high command was deeply concerned about the Navy's ability to secure the Main Supply Route (MSR), which was vital for the operation's success. This responsibility fell to the Commander of the Northern Naval Area (Comnorth). Commodore H.R. Amaraweera, the Commander of the Northern Naval Area at the time, assured the Army of the Navy's capability to secure the MSR.

On the eve of Operation Riviresa, the Navy managed to maintain the Main Supply Route, despite significant sacrifices by naval personnel in the deep northern seas and in protecting the KKS harbor, the only gateway to the north. Preparations for the offensive began with the resumption of hostilities after peace talks failed, following the LTTE attack on the Trincomalee naval base. President Kumaratunga's administration ordered active military operations against the LTTE. Planning and preparations for the operation were conducted by Major General (later General) Rohan Daluwatte, the overall Operations Commander, under the purview of Lieutenant Colonel (later General) Anuruddha Ratwatte, who was the Deputy Minister of Defense.

Planning for the operation started in June 1993 under the Command of Major General Gamunu Kulatunge, who directed Col. Lucky Rajasinghe to plan the operation, assisted by Col. Mohan Rockwood as a response to the assassination of President Ranasinghe Premadasa by the LTTE on 1 May 1993.

The Tiger high-command, knowing that plans were ongoing to capture the city of Jaffna, launched a pre-emptive strike on Sri Lanka Army and Navy positions in the Kilali area and tried to overrun their positions at Poonaryn on 11 November 1993. Though there were major losses at Poonaryn, the Sri Lankan military fought back to hold the isolated military camp with some determined tactical battles at all levels (commanded by Lt. Colonel Ranjith De Silva). On the same night, 52 ‘Black Tigers’, elite commandos of the LTTE tried to infiltrate Palaly airbase by sea to destroy the aircraft, and were discovered and intercepted by the 1st Field Engineer Regiment troops (Commanded by Lt. Colonel Lucky Rajasinghe SLE and Major Lakshman David SLE), killing 13 black tigers. The surviving Black Tigers retreated to their base. This resulted in Palaly, Elephant Pass, Poonaryn and Kayts being held by the Sri Lankan military, with the rest of the peninsula being held by the Tigers. Since the main staging area for the attack was in Palaly, a small scale operation, code-named Operation Leap Forward (planned and conducted by Major General Srilal Weerasooriya and Colonel Hiran Halangoda), was launched to expand the perimeter of the air base prior to Operation Riviresa expanding the holding area west of Karainagar. However, it was thwarted by LTTEs counter-attack, code-named Operation Tiger Leap.

== Operation ==
Riviresa Campaign Services Medal

Operation Thunder Strike, a preliminary action to further enlarge the required staging area to the east, was launched on 28 September 1995. 532 Brigade, under the command of Colonel Lucky Rajasinghe, was tasked with the capture of the Achchuweli area. They were supported by the rest of 53 Division's resources commanded by Brigadier Janaka Perera. As 53 Division was consolidating in the Achchuweli area on the night of 31 October, the LTTE launched a major counter-attack on the division's positions. As the attack was anticipated by Brigadier Janaka Perera, it was repelled by troops of the 53 Division, which resulted in a large number of casualties for the LTTE. This was the key moment of the battle as this loss demoralized the LTTE cadres and SL Army troops realized the vulnerability of the LTTE tactical operations, boosting their morale. Operation RIVIRESA-I was launched on 17 October 1995 with the aim of wresting control of the Valikamam area of the Jaffna peninsula. Major General (later General) Rohan Daluwatte and Brigadier (later Major General) Janaka Perera were two key military personnel who were instrumental in the leadership and success of the operation. 20,000 troops of the Sri Lanka Army were deployed at the outset of the attack, they were supported by the Sri Lanka Air Force and the Sri Lanka Navy.

The operation, commanded by Major General Rohan Daluwatte as Overall Operations Commander (OOC), involved three divisions. The 51st Division, commanded by Brigadier (Later Major General) Neil Dias and deputy commander Brigadier (later Field Marshal) Sarath Fonseka and the 52nd Division, commanded by Brigadier (later Major General) P.A. Karunathilaka and deputy commander Brigadier (later Major General) Anton Wijendra, advanced astride the Jaffna - Point Pedro and Jaffna - Palaly Road axes respectively up to a line joining Kopay and Kondavil. This advance was met with stiff resistance from the LTTE. It took the two divisions almost a month to cover the 12-mile stretch. From this lateral line, the 53rd Division, consisting of Special Forces commanded by Brigadier Janaka Perera and deputy commander Colonel (later Major General) Gamini Hettiarachchi broke out and launched a narrow frontal attack that headed directly to the east of Jaffna town, capturing key crossroads along the way. The 53rd Division consisted of the 534 Independent Brigade (commanded by Colonel Percy Fernando), 531 Air Mobile Brigade (commanded by Colonel Hiran Halangoda), 533 Armored Brigade (commanded by Colonel Gamini Balsooriya) and 532 Infantry Brigade (commanded by Colonel Lucky Rajasinghe). The LTTE had prepared for the attack in advance by mining all roads into the peninsula and creating defenses in depth with additional cadres from the eastern province. 531 Brigade met with stiff resistance on 18 November, but managed to maneuver the troops east to avoid the heavily mined built-up areas. On 19 November 534 Brigade stepped into the attack and fought one of the hardest battles as they moved to cut off the main road linking Jaffna from the rest of the peninsula. Brigadier Janaka Perera ordered the 532 Infantry Brigade into action without giving the LTTE an opportunity to regroup and the said brigade, fighting through some of fierce battles and reached the waters of Colombuthurai on 20 November 1995, cutting off Valikamam from the Vadamarachchi and Tenamarachchi areas. However, an intense battle still had to be fought to evict the remaining cadres from Jaffna town.

== Battle for Jaffna ==
On 29 November 1995, 53 Division, commanded By Brigadier Janaka Perera launched an assault on the LTTE positions guarding Jaffna town. Brigadier Perera decided to commence the operation on a narrow front to minimize civilian casualties. He launched the 532 Infantry Brigade, (commanded by Colonel Lucky Rajasinghe), from the east to penetrate and probe the defenses held by the LTTE. As the brigade ran into a tight LTTE defense on Navalar Road. Colonel Lucky Rajasinghe ordered a 'turning movement' from the north, moving around the LTTE defenses and capturing the Nallur Area. Brigadier Janaka Perera, seizing the gap created by the infantry brigade, simultaneously launched the air-mobile 531 Brigade (commanded by Colonel Hiran Halangoda), to capture Jaffna Fort. At the same time the independent 534 Brigade (commanded by Colonel Percy Fernando), set-out along the east coast to capture the Jaffna Jetty. With three brigades attacking simultaneously from three different sides, the LTTE was unable to coordinate their defenses effectively.

By the evening of 1 December, three brigades had breached the LTTE defenses, causing confusion. During the night of 1 December, LTTE cadres were taking advantage of the darkness, escaping in boats across Kilali Lagoon and abandoning the city's defenses. On the morning of 2 December 1995, following an intense 50-day battle, troops of 53 Division entered Jaffna city almost un-opposed.

=== Aftermath ===
Political leadership against the advice of military planners, expected the LTTE to collapse after the loss of Jaffna city. But the LTTE fell back to gain time to re-group and was back in little time more fierce than ever.

Unfortunately for Sri Lanka, five of the brigade commanders who mattered the most were lost within the next year - three were killed in battle and two left the Army, disgruntled by dissatisfied planning by the political and military leadership. SL Forces were unable to hold on to the subsequent gains (Navatkuli to Killinochchi from North and Vavuniya to Mankulum from the South), made into the LTTE areas beyond the immediate vicinity of Jaffna City. Political leadership continued to drive the military leadership (against the advice of the military commanders), to stretch their forces beyond the practical limits of defense as they continued to believe that the LTTE would collapse after the fall of Jaffna City. The whole concept of the conduct of operations changed from the ‘execution of political (National) aims planned and conducted by military leadership' to political leaders stepping in to the shoes of military commanders in their determination to gain popularity (with the objective of destroying the LTTE), by sacrificing the long term political and military objective of 'winning the hearts and minds of the Tamil population'.
