= Sebastião Gonçalves Tibau =

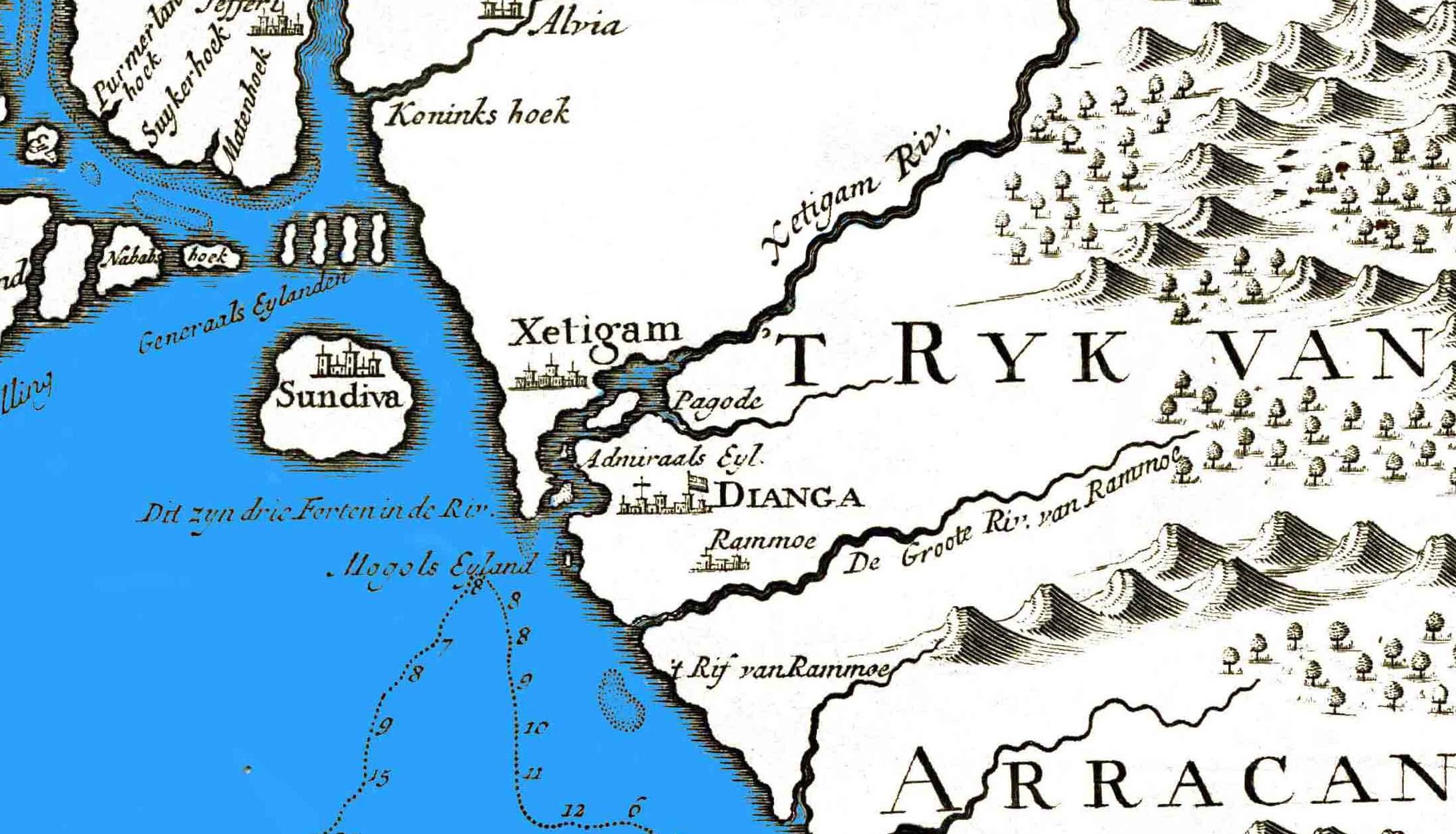
- Excerpt from a 1724 map showing the island of Sandwip, Dianga, and "Xetigam" (Chittagong) in the Bay of Bengal, the site of Tibau's exploits.
- Born: c. 1587; Santo Antão do Tojal, Loures, Portugal
- Died: 1616
- Piratical career
- Allegiance: Portuguese Empire (initially); Independent (Kingdom of Sandwip)
- Rank: Privateer / Pirate King

Sebastião Gonçalves Tibau (or Sebastião Gonçalves Tibao) (born Santo Antão do Tojal, Loures, c. 1587 – died 1616) was a 17th-century Portuguese adventurer and filibuster. Operating in the region of modern-day Myanmar and the ancient Kingdom of Pegu, he managed—through his wits, personal valor, ambition, and lack of scruples—to seize control of the ancient Kingdom or territory of Sandwip. There he was proclaimed King and maintained his rule for several years until his eventual downfall.

== Early life ==
He was a native of Santo Antão do Tojal and the son of humble parents, although the Tibau family was originally of the nobility. He embarked for Portuguese India in 1605. Shortly after, he deserted the service of the Crown and traveled to Bengal as a simple private in the India Armada of that year. The region of the Bay of Bengal was ruled by numerous indigenous potentates who were constantly engaged in rivalries. It was a place where the Portuguese—arriving from Goa and Malacca—could escape the discipline and surveillance of Portuguese authorities. Consequently, the area filled with fugitives from justice, or levantados (renegades) as they were called at the time. These men knew how to find secure means of living in that environment by serving local chiefs indiscriminately against one another.

Sebastião Gonçalves Tibau began as a factor on salt vessels, which was the largest trade in the region. After saving some funds, he acquired a jalia (a small vessel used for both trade and attacks in rivers and estuaries). Loading it with goods, he began trading on his own account in the Kingdom of Arakan, where a Sultan designated as the Mogh reigned. He established himself in Dianga, which at that time was part of the aforementioned Kingdom of Arakan.

== Massacre of Dianga ==
The Portuguese mercenary Filipe de Brito e Nicote, who had seized power and "reigned" in Syriam, having become independent of the King of Arakan, Min Razagyi, attempted to take possession of Dianga in 1607. This revolt resulted in vengeance from the Burmese Sultan, who ordered the slaughter of the Portuguese trading there. The Sultan massacred not only the son of Filipe de Brito e Nicote (who had been sent on an embassy by his father) but also approximately 600 Portuguese inhabitants of Dianga. Sebastião Gonçalves Tibau escaped the slaughter. A small number of Portuguese managed to flee and established themselves on an island in the mouth of the Ganges River. One of them was Sebastião Gonçalves Tibau.

== Sandwip ==
On the nearby island of Sandwip (or Sundiva) in the Bay of Bengal—an area of 18 square leagues inhabited by some Portuguese and many local Christians—the Administrator (Regedor), a certain Manuel de Matos, had died. Immediately, a Moor named Fatih Khan (Fatecan) attempted to seize the island, slaughtering the Portuguese and their auxiliaries living there. Shortly after the Dianga massacre, and still in 1607, Sebastião Gonçalves Tibau attacked and conquered the island with 400 Portuguese.

Some Portuguese ships were wandering the seas, and the Moor directed his forces against them. On his boat, Fatih Khan carried a large flag that read: Fatih Khan, by the Grace of God, Lord of Sandwip, shedder of Christian blood and destroyer of the Portuguese Nation. In the naval encounter with the small group of Portuguese vessels, luck favored the Portuguese. After defeating and killing Fatih Khan, the Portuguese elected Sebastião Gonçalves Tibau as their Chief. He thus became the Lord or "King" of Sandwip. He resisted enemy attacks with the people he had at his side—Portuguese and natives—and through alliances established with various local chiefs. He even recruited Spaniards who were leading the same adventurous life as many Portuguese in this part of Southeast Asia.

Sebastião Gonçalves Tibau's efforts to have his throne recognized by the Portuguese government, whether the central one in Lisbon or the one in Goa, were ineffective. Neither Lisbon nor Goa lent themselves to his self-interested game, and they always distrusted the adventures of the chatins (merchants) who enriched themselves quickly. He then founded a Republic of Pirates (numbering about 3000) on Sandwip, descendants of whom still exist today. He commanded a formidable squadron of pirates in the seas of Bengal. He governed the island as an independent King, having a force of 1000 Portuguese under his command. He also occupied the islands of Dakhin Shahbazpur and Patelbanga. Through this, he dedicated himself to piracy, spreading violence and terror in the seas of Bengal. These pirates caused such fear that Shihabuddin Talish, a historian of the Great Mughal, stated that "if one hundred ships (of the sailors of the Bengal fleet) saw only four of the others (of the Portuguese), the crews considered themselves very lucky if they could save themselves by flight..."

Sebastião Gonçalves Tibau became Indianized without, however, losing contact with his homeland. In 1607, taking the side of the King of Anapuran (brother of the King of Arakan), he took in the King's daughter, converted her to Christianity, and married her. He thus inherited substantial wealth and territories while simultaneously promoting the marriage of the Dowager Queen of Anapuran to his brother, António Gonçalves Tibau.

== War against Arakan ==
At that time, the Mughal Empire was invading Bengal and confronting the Kingdom of Arakan. Tibau took the side of Arakan because it suited him at the moment, without measuring future consequences. However, yielding to old hatreds, Tibau betrayed his ally. Cornering the Arakanese fleet at the mouth of a river, he delivered it to the Great Mughal, helping him to behead and enslave the subordinates of Arakan and seizing lands and riches. The King of Arakan swore his ruin, impaled a nephew of Tibau alive, and prepared to destroy him.

In 1615, lacking resources and thinking of conquering Arakan, Tibau asked Goa for help and appealed to the Viceroy, proposing a tribute. The Viceroy Jerónimo de Azevedo immediately accepted and sent an armada to his aid. It consisted of 14 galiots, one hulk, and one patache, commanded by Francisco de Meneses ("The Red"), who had previously been Governor of Ceylon. The armada arrived in Arakan in October and immediately (as ordered by the Viceroy) attacked the Arakanese fleet of King Min Khamaung, which was reinforced by a Dutch fleet, without waiting for Tibau's fleet as had been planned. In two successive combats, the Portuguese Armada managed to sweep away the Arakanese. However, the Arakanese, being very numerous, gained the upper hand in the first combat. When Tibau arrived, furious, they attacked again but were ultimately defeated. Many Portuguese nobles died in the battle, including Francisco de Meneses, who was succeeded by Admiral Luís de Azevedo, the Viceroy's brother.

Shortly after, Luís de Azevedo returned to Goa with the majority of the army, leaving Tibau with few forces and once again at the mercy of his enemies. The Dutch were already in the region, engaged in perfidious war against the Portuguese, and native chiefs revolted against Lusitanian influence allied with them. In 1616, Sebastião Gonçalves Tibau was defeated by the King of Arakan, who invaded and took possession of Sandwip. Having miraculously escaped the naval combat but abandoned by the Portuguese (to whom he had already ceded his Kingdom of Sandwip), hated by the natives, and threatened by the Dutch allies of the indigenous sovereigns, Sebastião Gonçalves Tibau fell into decline. It is not recorded whether he died in his former domains or returned to Goa with what remained of his former fortune. After Tibau's defeat, the Portuguese of Eastern Bengal (outside the control of Goa) continued to dedicate themselves to piracy. With struggles intensifying against the Dutch and English, the Portuguese domains in Burma suffered the consequences. Transitorily dependent on Portuguese Syriam, the old Kingdom of Sandwip of Sebastião Gonçalves Tibau followed the fate of all Pegu. With the disappearance of their adventurers, the chiefs Filipe de Brito e Nicote and Sebastião Gonçalves Tibau remained in the history of the Portuguese Orient only as the "King of Syriam" and the "King of Sandwip", respectively.

He had a brother, António de Carvalho Tibau, who was also a captain of great valor: "he arrived ... with five jalias to fight with one hundred of the King of Arakan, and not only defeated them but also took them all".

He left at least one son, who bore the same name, and a nephew, also of the same name (Gonçalves Tibau). Sebastien Manrique met them during his stay in Dianga, and they accompanied him on his visit to the King of Arakan, Sirisudhammaraja, in Mrauk U in 1630.

== Bibliography ==
- Collis, Maurice. The Land of the Great Image: Being Experiences of Friar Manrique in Arakan. usually cited as *Na Terra da Grande Imagem*. Livraria Civilização - Porto. 1944.
- de Faria e Sousa, Manuel. Ásia Portuguesa, part III. pp. 175–180 and 268–272.
- Bocarro, António. Década XIII da História da Índia. First published in 1876 by the Academia Real da Sciencias de Lisboa, under the direction of Rodrigo José de Lima Felner, in Collecção de Monumentos ineditos para a história das conquistas dos portugueses em Africa, Asia e America - tomo VI - 1a serie. Lisbon, Typographia da Academia Real das Sciencias. pp. 431–456, 477 & 530.
- Colonial Voyage - Bengal
