= Mandaitivu =

Island

Native name: மண்டைதீவு මන්ඩතිව්
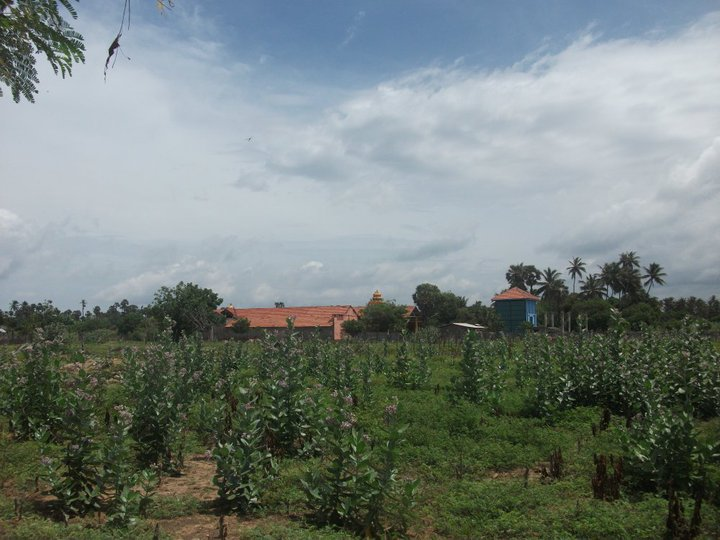

- Location within Northern Province Location within Sri Lanka

Geography
- Coordinates: 9°36′48″N 79°59′44″E
- Area: 7.56 km^{2} (2.92 sq mi)

Administration
- Sri Lanka
- Province: Northern
- District: Jaffna
- DS Division: Islands South

Demographics
- Population: 1,524 (2012)
- Pop. density: 202/km^{2} (523/sq mi)
- Languages: Tamil
- Ethnic groups: Sri Lankan Tamils

Additional information
- Time zone: Sri Lanka Standard Time Zone (UTC+5:30)

Mandaitivu (Tamil: மண்டைதீவு, romanized: Maṇṭaitīvu; Sinhala: මන්ඩතිව් Manḍativ) is an island off the coast of the Jaffna Peninsula in northern Sri Lanka, located approximately 3 kilometres (2 mi) south of the city of Jaffna. The island has an area of 7.56 square kilometres (2.92 sq mi) and is divided into three village officer divisions (Mandaitivu East, Mandaitivu South, and Mandaitivu West), whose combined population was 1,524 at the 2012 census.

Mandaitivu is connected to the Jaffna Peninsula and the neighbouring island of Velanaitivu by a causeway.

== See also ==
- Mandaitivu sea massacre
- Battle of Mandaitivu
