= Battle of Weli Oya (1995) =

Battle of the Sri Lankan civil war

- Part of the Sri Lankan civil war
Date	28 July 1995
Location	Weli Oya, Sri Lanka
Result	Sri Lanka Army Victory

Belligerents
Sri Lanka	Liberation Tigers of Tamil Eelam

Commanders and leaders
Brigadier Janaka Perera	Theepan

Units involved
Sri Lanka Armed Forces; Sri Lanka Army; Sri Lanka Army Volunteer Force; Sri Lanka National Guard; Artillery units; Engineering units; Sri Lanka Navy; Sri Lanka Air Force	Liberation Tigers of Tamil Eelam

Casualties and losses
2 killed, 18 wounded	~300 killed (182 bodies recovered by the SL Army); 15 boats sunk

The Battle of Weli Oya, took place between the militant Liberation Tigers of Tamil Eelam (LTTE or Tamil Tigers) and the Sri Lanka Army during the Sri Lankan Civil War for control of the military bases in Weli Oya in northern Sri Lanka on 28 July 1995.

== Background ==
The LTTE launched a surprise attack, on the government controlled area of Weli Oya, aimed at overrunning four army camps (Kokkilai, Kokkuthuduvai, Jayasinghapura and Janakapura) in the area including the Weli Oya Brigade headquarters. Troops posted to these camps were mostly reservists from volunteer regiments, national guardsmen with artillery and engineering units. The army units came under the command of Brigadier Janaka Perera, Brigade Commander of the 6th "Weli Oya" Brigade, who had prepared the defense of the camps, having gain warning of a possible attack from the military intelligence.

== Attack ==
On the morning of 28 July 1995, LTTE units which included veterans from their attack on Pooneryn armed with weapons captured from the army at Pooneryn; attacked from both land and from seaward amphibious landings. Within five hours the attack had withered with the LTTE suffering over 300 carders killed, including its leaders. The US State Department stated that some of the dead bodies of LTTE caders recovered by the army were found to be as young as 14 years of age. The army units which had put a stiff defense had sustained 2 killed and many wounded. The attackers failed to penetrate the defense lines or knock out artillery gun placements as it had planned with the use of female suicide bombers. SLAF provided air support, knocking out LTTE transports, while the Sri Lanka Navy deployed Dvora-class fast patrol boats off the coast of Weli Oya disrupting LTTE movements at sea.

== Aftermath ==
Soon after the battle, Brigadier Perera was transferred to command the elite Reserve Strike Force (RSF) which consisted of special forces, commando and air mobile units in Jaffna. A few months later he played a major role commanding the elite 53 Division in the Operation Riviresa which the Sri Lanka Army re-captured the whole of the Jaffna peninsula Following his retirement, Major General Janaka Perera entered politics contesting in the 2008 North Central Provincial Council election for the post of Chief Minister. Although his party failed to gained majority, he won the highest number of preferences. He was killed a few months later by a LTTE suicide bomber on 6 October 2008 in Anuradhapura. Soon after the battle the LTTE disbanded its civilian militia it had formed in 1992, believing that military intelligence had gained intelligence about the attack from one of the members of the militia.

== See also ==
- List of Sri Lankan Civil War battles
- Battle of Pooneryn
- Battle of Mullaitivu (1996)
