= Francisco de Meneses =

3rd Governor of Portuguese Ceylon
- In office 1613–1614
- Monarch: Philip II of Portugal
- Preceded by: Jerónimo de Azevedo
- Succeeded by: Manuel Mascarenhas Homem

Francisco de Meneses was the 3rd Governor of Portuguese Ceylon. de Meneses was appointed in 1613 under Philip II of Portugal, he was Governor until 1614. He was succeeded by Manuel Mascarenhas Homem.

Government offices
Preceded by Jerónimo de Azevedo	Governor of Portuguese Ceylon; 1613–1614	Succeeded by Manuel Mascarenhas Homem
