= Boossa =

Place in Southern Province, Sri Lanka

- Location within Sri Lanka
- Coordinates: 6°4′24″N 80°9′28″E
- Country: Sri Lanka
- Province: Southern
- District: Galle
- Elevation: 5 m (16 ft)
- Time zone: UTC+5:30 (Sri Lanka Standard Time Zone)
  - Summer (DST): UTC+6 (Summer time)

Boossa is a small town on the south coast of Sri Lanka, located in the Galle District of the Southern Province. It is approximately 123 kilometres (76 mi) south of Colombo and 12 kilometres (7.5 mi) north of Galle, immediately north of the mouth of the Gin Ganga (Gin River). It is situated at an elevation of 5 metres (16 ft) above the sea level.

Boossa was affected by the tsunami caused by the 2004 Indian Ocean earthquake with 28 known deaths.

== Transport ==
Boossa is located on the Coastal or Southern Rail Line (connecting Colombo through to Matara), and the A2 highway, connecting Colombo to Wellawaya.

== Facilities ==
- Boossa Regimental Training School
- Boossa Sri Lanka Navy Training Centre (Nipuna Camp)
- Boossa Detention Centre
- Boosa Prison
- Boossa railway station

== Attractions ==
- Boossa beach
- Jayawardanaramaya Buddhist temple, which was built by the monk Medankara and his grandfather Mohandiram Mudeyanselage Janis de Silva in 1700 A.C. The Pagoda is the only one in Sri Lanka constructed out of stone in 1805 A.C.

== Post and telephone ==
- Sri Lanka 00 94
- Area code 09
- Postal code 80270

== Other ==
The headquarters of the 58 Division are located in the town.

== See also ==
- List of towns in Southern Province, Sri Lanka
- List of beaches in Sri Lanka
