= Ranjith de Silva =

Sri Lankan general

- Born: Colombo
- Military career
- Allegiance: Sri Lanka
- Branch: Sri Lanka Army
- Service years: 1972–2006 (34 years)
- Rank: Major General
- Commands: Sri Lanka Light Infantry
- Conflicts: Sri Lankan Civil War
- Awards: Rana Wickrama Padakkama, Rana Sura Padakkama, Uttama Seva Padakkama
- Other work: District Secretary, Trincomalee District

Major General T.T. Ranjith de Silva, RWP, RSP, USP, psc was a Sri Lankan army general. He served as Security Forces Commander – Eastern Province and District Secretary, Trincomalee District. He is known for leading the defence of the Sri Lanka Army garrison in Pooneryn during the Battle of Pooneryn.

Silva received his education at Dharmapala Vidyalaya and joined the Sri Lanka Army in 1972 as a cadet officer. Having completed his officer training at the Sri Lanka Military Academy, he was commissioned into the Sri Lanka Light Infantry as a Second Lieutenant in the Regular Force. In January 1991, he was appointed commanding officer of the 1st Battalion, Sri Lanka Light Infantry and that year attended the advanced infantry officers course at the United States Army Infantry School at Fort Benning. The 1st Battalion, Sri Lanka Light Infantry was stationed at Pooneryn when the Pooneryn garrison was attacked by the LTTE on 11 November 1993. With the defense perimeter breached, and the battalion headquarters of the 3rd Battalion, Gajaba Regiment over run and the two T-54A main battle tanks in the garrison captured; Major Ranjith de Silva lead the remaining troops in a desperate defense around the battalion headquarters of the 1st Sri Lanka Light Infantry until reinforcements arrived three days later. He received a field promotion for preventing the complete fall of the garrison to Colonel. He served as the Centre Commandant of the Sri Lanka Light Infantry.
