= Jerónimo de Azevedo =

Portuguese fidalgo, governor, and viceroy

His Lordship Dom Jerónimo de Azevedo
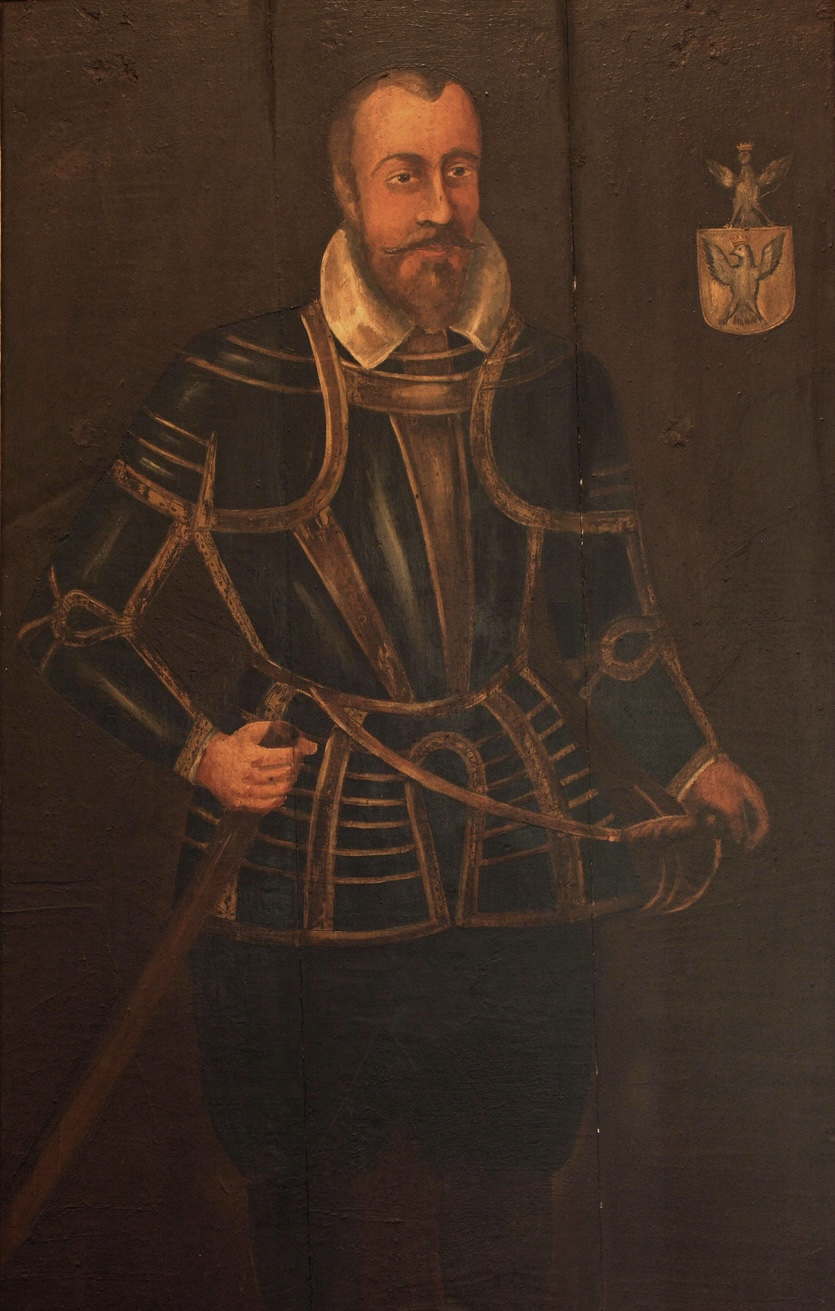

Viceroy of Portuguese India
- In office 1612–1617
- Preceded by: Rui Lourenço de Távora
- Succeeded by: João Coutinho

2nd Governor of Portuguese Ceylon
- In office 1594–1612
- Monarchs: Philip I of Portugal; Philip II of Portugal
- Preceded by: Pedro Lopes de Sousa
- Succeeded by: Francisco de Meneses

Personal details
- Born: Jerónimo de Azevedo de Ataíde Malafaya c. 1550 (?) Estate of Barbosa, Kingdom of Portugal
- Died: 1625 Lisbon, Kingdom of Portugal
- Resting place: Igreja de São Roque, Lisbon
- Citizenship: Portuguese

Military service
- Allegiance: Kingdom of Portugal
- Battles/wars: Invasion of Kandy (1603) Sinhalese–Portuguese conflicts

Dom Jerónimo de Azevedo (Estate of Barbosa, Entre-Douro-e-Minho, Portugal, circa 1550 (?) – Lisbon, São Jorge Castle, 1625) was a Portuguese fidalgo, Governor (captain-general) of Portuguese Ceylon and viceroy of Portuguese India. He proclaimed in Colombo, in 1597, the King of Portugal, Philip I, as the legitimate heir to the throne of Kotte, thus substantiating the Portuguese claims of sovereignty over the island of Ceylon.

== Early life ==
He was born Jerónimo de Azevedo de Ataíde e Malafaya, one of the thirteen children of Dom Manuel de Azevedo, Comendador of the monastery of São João de Alpendurada. He was thus a half-brother of the Jesuit martyr, Blessed Inácio de Azevedo.

Not being the firstborn son, he did not inherit his father's estate, that included the lordship of the medieval honras of Barbosa and Ataíde, each with an estimated annual income of 100 thousand reais, a considerable sum in 16th century Portugal. Dom Jerónimo was thus compelled to follow the example of many second sons of the Portuguese nobility of that era, by emigrating at a young age to the most important of Portugal's overseas possessions, the Estado da Índia, where he made his career.

He entered royal service on 25 March 1577, as a page (moço fidalgo) of King Sebastian's household (this was a posting usually reserved for very young members of the nobility, suggesting he probably was born during of even after the late 1540s - and not around year 1540 as referred in some sources). The appointment was made with his going to the East already in view and some time later, he sailed to India.

== Capture of Maldives ==
The leader of the Portuguese forces during the capture of the Maldives in 1558 was Dom Jerónimo de Azevedo. He played a significant role in the Portuguese expansion in the Indian Ocean.

Dom Jerónimo de Azevedo led the military expedition to the Maldives, and under his command, the Portuguese captured the Maldivian capital, Malé, in 1558. The Maldivian ruler at that time was Sultan Ali VI, and the Portuguese captured him during their invasion.

However, the Portuguese rule in the Maldives was relatively short-lived, lasting for about 15 years. The Maldivians successfully revolted against Portuguese rule, and in 1573, they managed to drive the Portuguese out of their islands and regain their independence. Maldivians Refer to him as Andhiri Andhirin.

== Governorship of Ceylon ==
Azevedo was Captain-Major of the Malabar coast for a period of 15 years, before being nominated Captain-General of Ceylon in the year 1594. He stayed in charge in Ceylon for a period of 18 years (from Christmas 1594 until November 1612), an unusual long period for holding one office in the Estado da Índia. He was a key figure in the late 16th-century and early 17th-century Portuguese attempts to take full control over the whole territory of present-day Sri Lanka.

The touchstone of Portuguese ambitions in Ceylon by the end of the 16th century was the bequest by King Dharmapala of Kotte in 1580 of his entire realm to the king of Portugal. Dharmapala was a Christian convert and his bequest was unacceptable to many of his Buddhist subjects and to the ruler of the neighboring kingdom of Kandy. The takeover was therefore resisted, and the Portuguese had to subjugate Kotte by force.

=== Military campaigns in Kotte ===
Azevedo arrived in Colombo with fresh troops on 24 December 1594, barely three months after his predecessor, Pedro Lopes de Sousa died at the battle of Danture (9 October 1594). The Portuguese army had been annihilated by the Kandyan forces in that battle and Azevedo found a kingdom of Kotte in full rebellion. On the first of January 1595 he held a review of the armed forces at his disposal, with king Dharmapala (the source of legitimacy for Portuguese rule in Kotte) at his side. He mustered 900 Portuguese and 2,000 Lascarin soldiers. He sized up the situation and decided he had to pacify the lowlands of Kotte before he could retaliate against Kandy. A difficult, ruthless and prolonged campaign to crush the revolts in the lowlands was thus started and it would concentrate most of Azevedo's attention until it was successfully concluded in 1602. By the end of 1601 the king of Portugal was already writing to the viceroy in Goa, promising to remember Azevedo's many services to the crown.

=== Proclamation of Philip I of Portugal as King of Kotte and the Malvana Convention ===
His governorship in Kotte is also noted for his dealing with complex political issues, which he tried to address in two steps - first, by convening a ceremony for the proclamation of the Portuguese King as sovereign of Kotte and second, by summoning the Convention of Malvana, after the death of king Dharmapala in 1597.

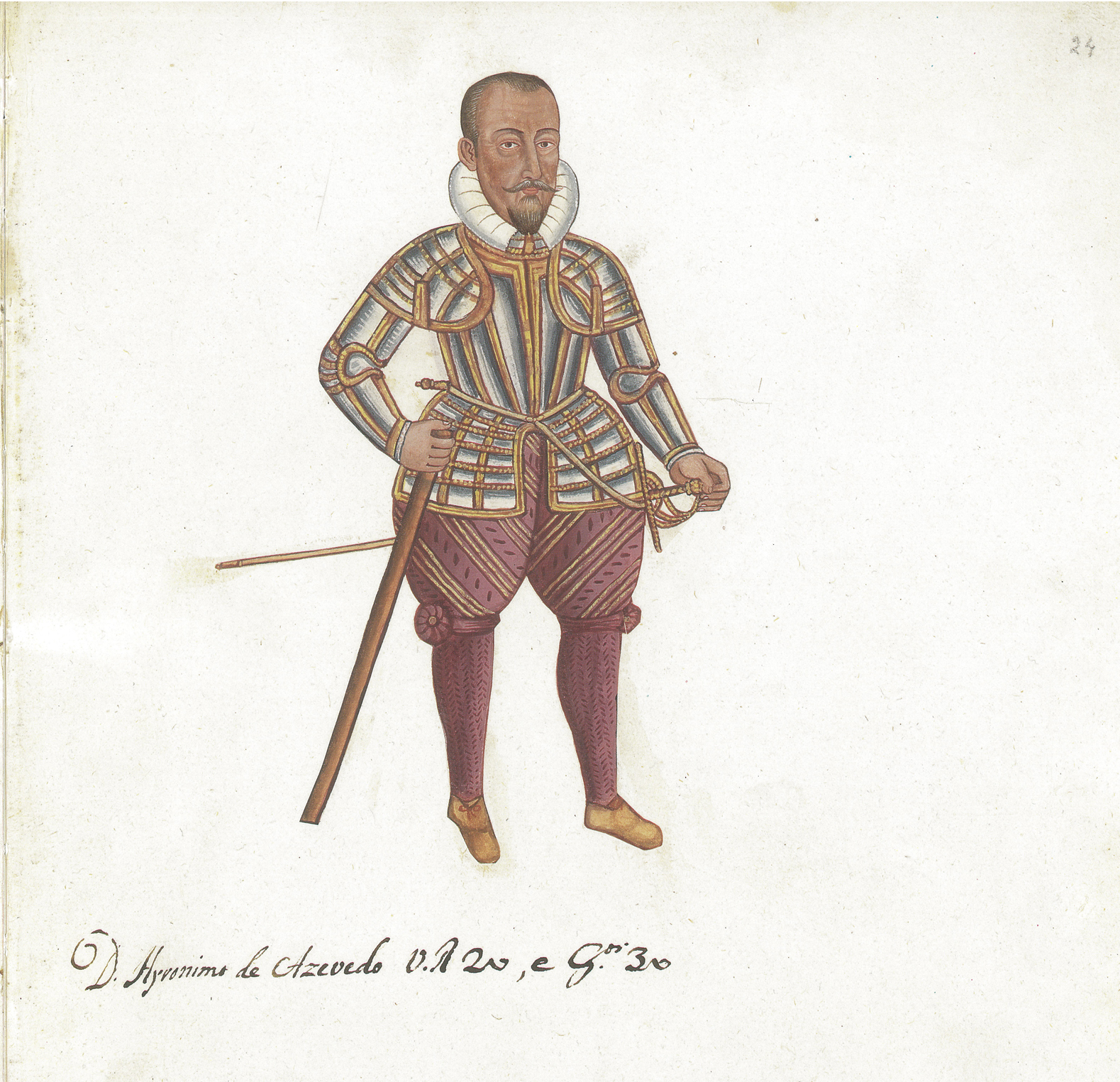
Dom Jerónimo de Azevedo, in Lyvro das Plataformas das Fortalezas da India by Manuel Godinho de Erédia

On 29 May 1597, just two days after the death of Dharmapala, Azevedo convened a meeting at the Igreja da Misericórdia of Colombo, with the presence of several Portuguese dignitaries and an important number of court nobles of Kotte. Among the local nobles were a mudalyar (a high military official), an aratchi (captain of a company of Lankan soldiers) and a patangatim (a caste headman among the fishermen). The participants in this Assembly had been chosen "by the main vassals of the King of Kotte" and, at the end, an aratchi made an announcement in Sinhala to the crowd gathered in front of the Misericórdia Church, stating that the late King Dharmapala had donated the throne to the King of Portugal, it being now necessary to proclaim him as the new monarch. The Assembly then swore allegiance to Philip I and a procession followed, going through the streets of Colombo, with the participants crying out, in the traditional Portuguese manner:

"Real, real, real, pelo muito poderoso Senhor el-Rey Dom Filipe Rei de Portugal e de Ceilão"

This Ceremony, quickly decided and organized by Azevedo, was thus equivalent to the acclamation of Filipe I as King of Portugal in the cortes of Almeirim, with the purpose of dispelling any doubts about the legitimate right of succession of the Portuguese sovereign to the throne of Kotte.

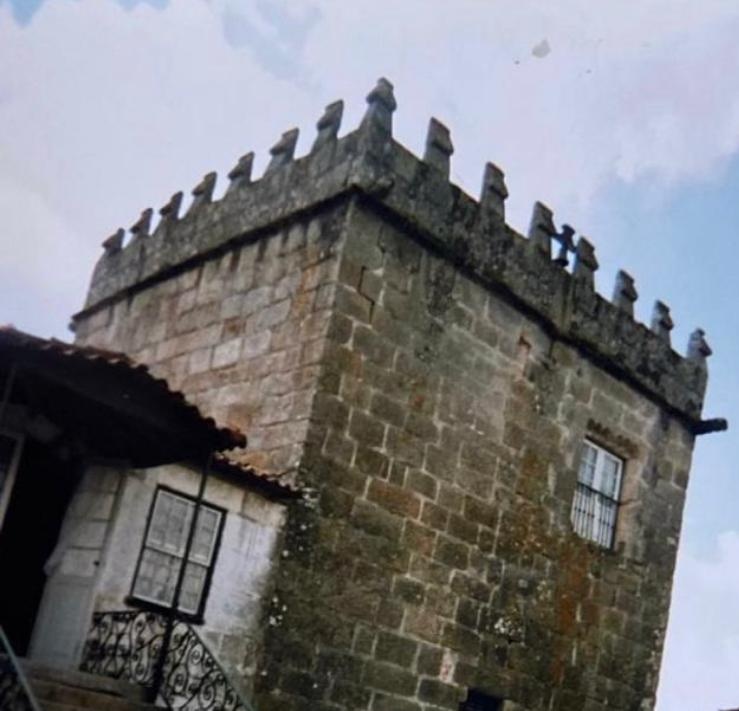
The 12th century tower of the Honra de Barbosa, near Penafiel, Portugal, where Dom Jerónimo de Azevedo was born

Azevedo then convened the so-called Malvana Convention, a meeting of representatives of all the districts of the kingdom and accepted - after two days of deliberations - that the native inhabitants of Kotte would keep their laws and customs, though they had to pledge allegiance to the king of Portugal. This convention is mentioned (some 40 years after it was allegedly convened) in a letter of grievance written by Sinhalese leaders to the captain-general, Diogo de Melo e Castro (1636 - 1638).

Flag of the Kingdom of Kotte, donated by its sovereign Dharmapala to the King of Portugal. When Dharmapala died in 1597, Azevedo took formal possession of the Kingdom on behalf of Philip I of Portugal

=== Opening of Ceylon to the Jesuits ===
Another issue to which Azevedo dedicated his attention was missionary activity. In 1554, the Portuguese crown had decided that its possessions in Ceylon would be an exclusive preserve of the Franciscans, and it reaffirmed this decision in 1593. Under Azevedo, however, this policy changed.

In January 1597 the Bishop of Cochin, D. André de Santa Maria, wrote to the King of Portugal, suggesting that the crown allow the Jesuits to engage in missionary activity in Ceylon, since the resources available to the Franciscans were allegedly "insufficient" for achieving the evangelizing objectives of Portugal. Later in that year, the Portuguese crown received specific proposals - based on the initial suggestions of the bishop of Cochin, fully supported by Azevedo, whose brother Inácio was a Jesuit martyr - on how to divide missionary activity in the island between the two Religious Orders. After much debate, these proposals were adopted by the crown and in April 1602 the first four Jesuits arrived in Colombo, backed by a patent issued by Viceroy Aires de Saldanha, in Goa, on 27 February 1602.

=== Military campaigns against Kandy ===
Azevedo was less successful in his attempts to subdue Kandy. He invaded the kingdom in 1603 in a carefully planned operation with a total force of about 1,100 Portuguese and 12,000 Sinhalese, but despite initial successes he was forced to withdraw after a rebellion erupted among the Lascarins, the indigenous troops who fought alongside the Portuguese forces. In contrast to his predecessor Pedro Lopes de Sousa, who died and his troops in a previous invasion, he did manage to prevent the annihilation of the Portuguese forces and showed exceptional military capabilities during this retreat that thus came to be known as a famosa retirada.

After this setback, Azevedo brought innovations to the formulation of Portuguese military strategy in Ceylon. He decided to abandon the traditional approach of trying to subdue Kandy with a single, decisive military offensive and adopted instead a new strategy based on economic warfare. Every year the Portuguese would engage in smaller but highly destructive biannual forays and raids deep inside Kandyan territory, burning crops and villages and driving off the cattle. This greatly weakened Kandy - in the words of a Portuguese chronicler, the Jesuit Fernão de Queiroz, the kingdom "never in our time recovered its former opulence and size". However, this strategy aimed at the economic strangulation of the kingdom of Kandy did not produce all the effects expected by Azevedo, because Portuguese traders in Indian port cities such as São Tomé de Meliapor, with the support of the Hindu king at Jaffna, refused to abandon their highly lucrative trades with Kandy.

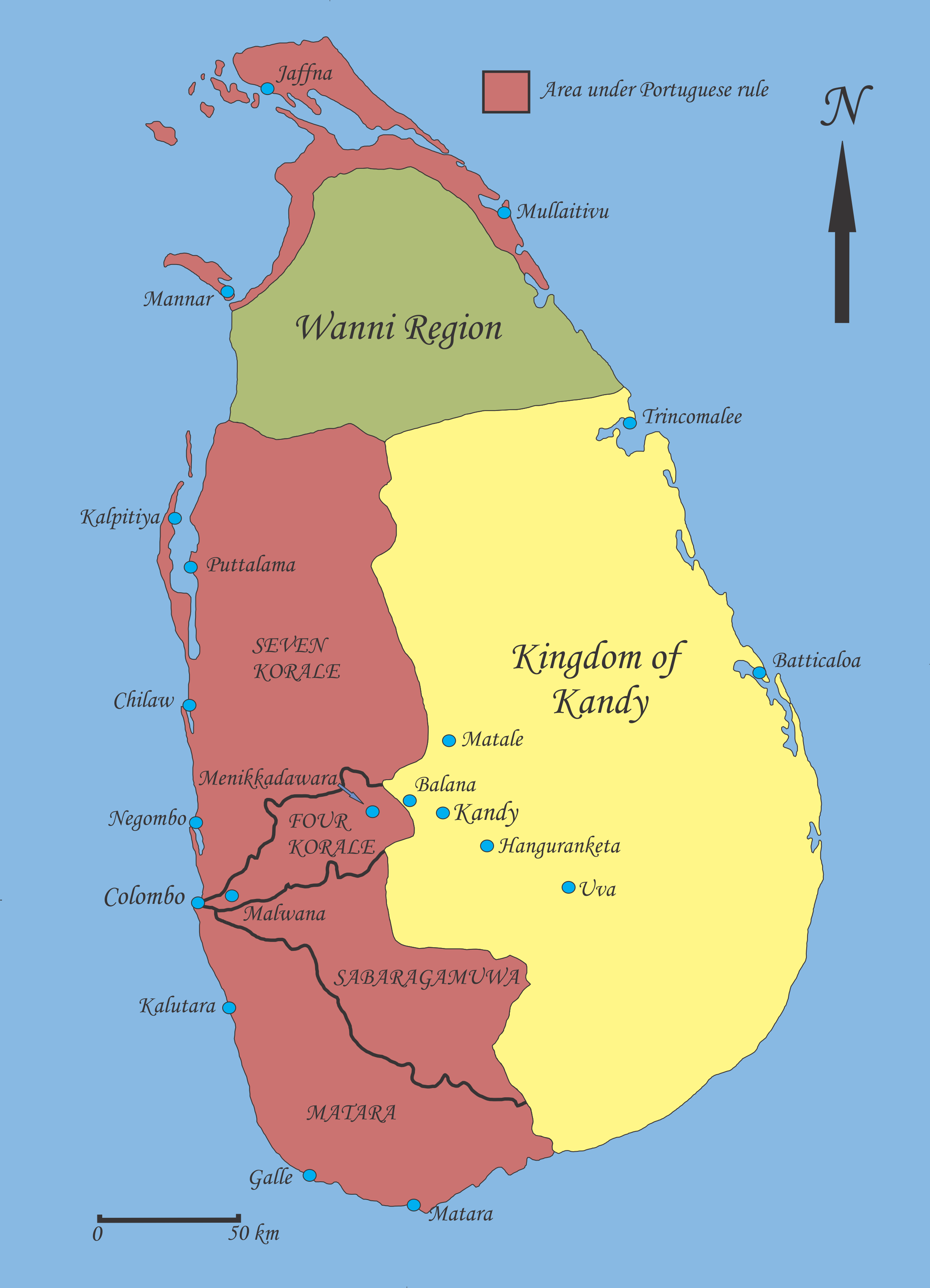
Political map of Ceylon in the early 17th century. Dom Jerónimo de Azevedo invaded Kandy in 1603, but was forced to retreat after a rebellion erupted among his Lascarin auxiliaries.

When he finally left Ceylon for Goa, Azevedo issued directives to his successor, insisting that his new strategy should continue to be followed until Kandy accepted a status of vassalage to the kingdom of Portugal

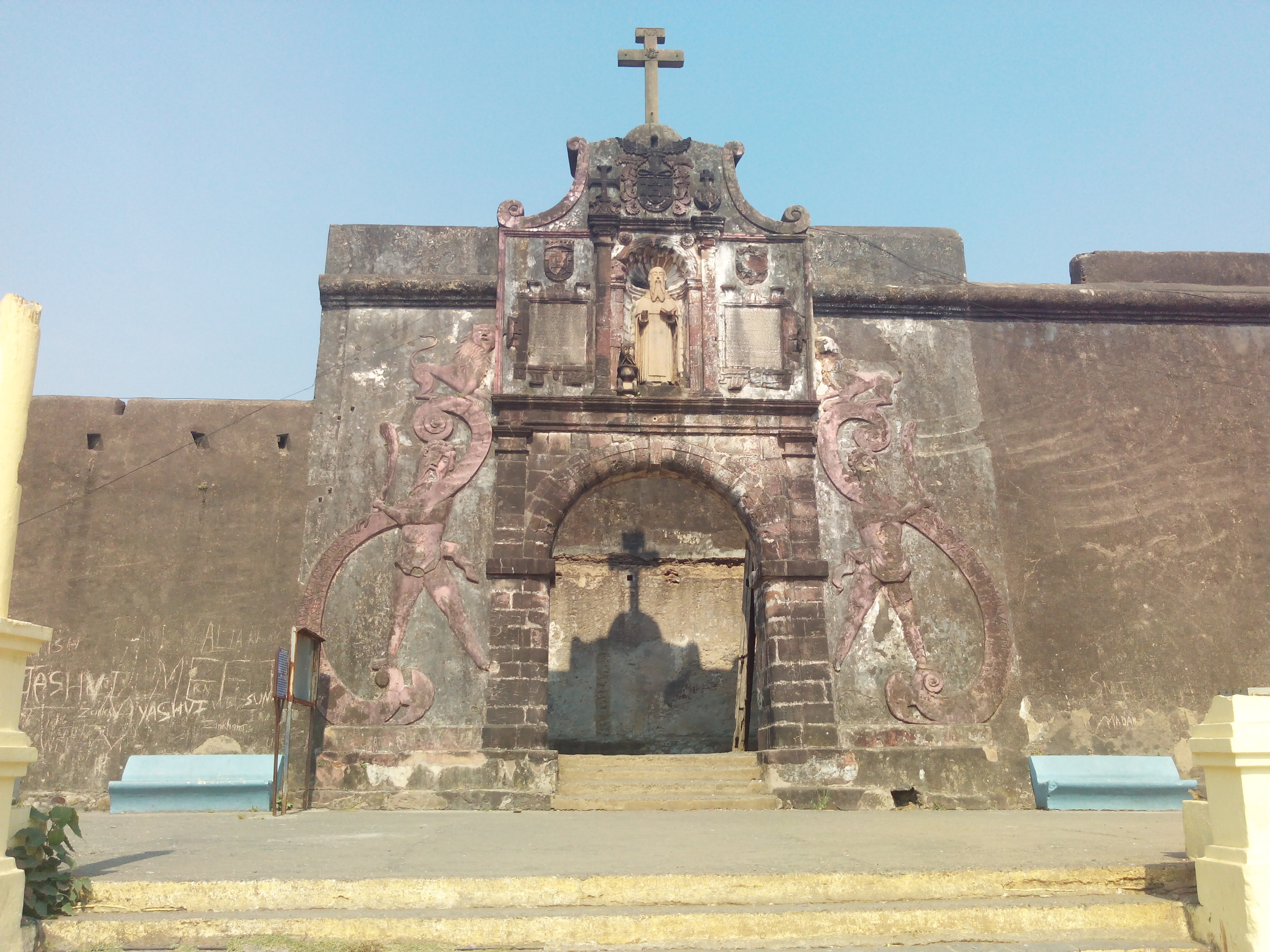
The Fort of São Jerónimo in Daman. Azevedo ordered its building in the year 1615, while viceroy in Goa.

== Viceroy of Portuguese India ==
Azevedo was appointed 20th viceroy of Portuguese India on 24 November 1611, and left Colombo for Goa where he assumed his new duties on 16 December 1612.

=== Resurgent Portuguese expansionism ===
According to historians such as Luís Filipe Thomaz and A. R. Disney, at the end of the 16th century and the beginning of the 17th century there was a period of new Portuguese expansionism in South and Southeast Asia, which reached its peak precisely when Dom Jerónimo de Azevedo took over the government in Goa. A. R. Disney writes that by the time of Dom Jerónimo de Azevedo's mandate as viceroy the influence of colonials in Goa, as distinct from metropolitan Portuguese, was steadily growing. These colonials had interests and an outlook that did not necessarily coincide with those of the metropolis. In practice, Azevedo – who had come to Asia as a young man and served for his entire career in the Portuguese Estado da Índia – was a colonial. This influence of colonials coincided with the above-mentioned period of resurgent Portuguese expansionism in the East, that - however - did not last very long and was already receding by the time he terminated his mandate as viceroy in 1617.

In 1615, Dom Jerónimo backed an audacious expedition to Pegu to loot the Moon imperial treasures in Mrauk-U, an enterprise that ultimately did not succeed. However, the fact that it was supported at such a high official level showed how plunder was considered a legitimate policy objective in 16th-century Portuguese-ruled Asia.

Also in 1615 Azevedo led a huge fleet that tried to drive English East India Company ships under the command of Nicholas Downton off Surat, but after a series of engagements (including a clash in which the viceroy's brother, Dom Manuel de Azevedo, captain of Chaul and Diu, sank a couple of English merchant vessels) he failed to achieve the strategic objective of dislodging the East India Company from the Indian Ocean trade routes – an incident which demonstrated that Portuguese Goa had lost the capacity to protect its monopoly of commerce on the Western coast of India.

=== Geographic explorations ===
During his government in Goa Azevedo also had to face the serious threat posed by the increasing pressure of Dutch fleets against the Portuguese possessions and trade routes in the Indian Ocean.

His response was not only military, for one surprising byproduct of the Dutch challenge was galvanizing the Portuguese into undertaking new journeys of geographical exploration, seen as a sort of preemptive strike against the movements of Dutch and English fleets. Between 1613 and 1616 Dom Jerónimo ordered two such expeditions to the coasts of Madagascar - known to the Portuguese as ilha de São Lourenço since the beginning of the 16th century - with the participation of Jesuit priests (the Jesuits were then very much engaged in such activity, including journeys to the interior of China and to Tibet). One of the aims of this project was evaluating the possibilities for conquest of the island. The expeditions explored the region, prepared a roteiro of the coasts of Madagascar, produced new regional maps and compiled many scientific observations, in a concrete demonstration that the spirit of discovery was still present in the Estado da Índia in the first quarter of the seventeenth century.

=== Fall from favor at the Habsburg court ===
Towards the end of his tenure, Azevedo began to lose the favor he had previously enjoyed at the court of the Spanish Habsburgs, who ruled Portugal.

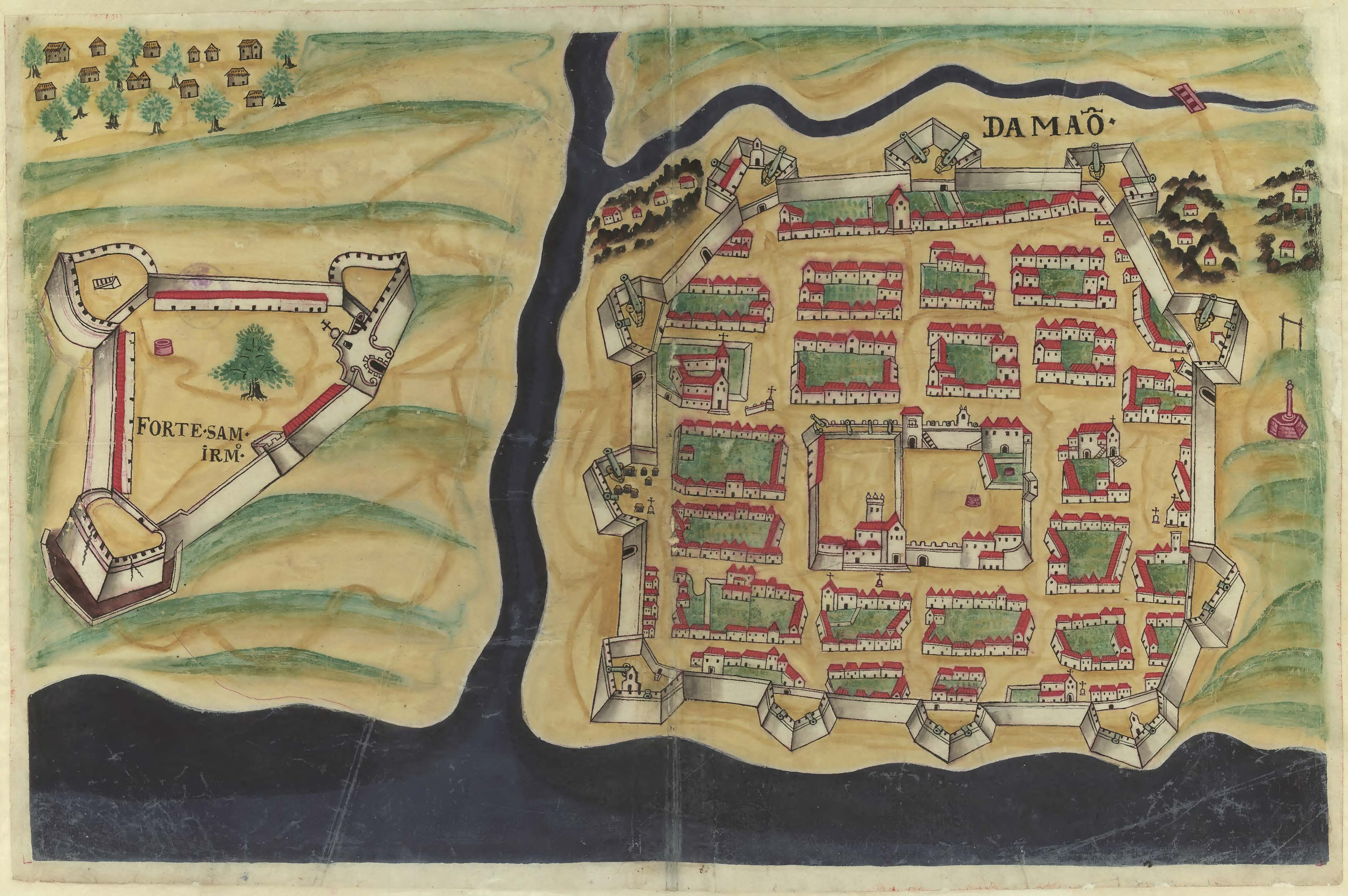
1635 map showing on its left side the Fort of São Jerónimo (Saint Jerome) in Nani Daman.

One factor that probably contributed to his downfall was the obstruction he made, when viceroy in Goa, to the mission of the Castilian national García de Silva Figueroa, appointed by king Philip III of Spain (Filipe II of Portugal) as his envoy to the Shah of Persia. Figueroa left Lisbon in April 1614, headed for a stopover in Goa, where he had strong disagreements with Azevedo, that prevented him from reaching his final destination until the year 1617. Azevedo even ordered Silva Figueroa's detention for a time before finally allowing him to continue his journey to Persia. In this approach, Dom Jerónimo was fully expressing the feelings of the local Portuguese in Goa. They saw with great concern the dispatch of a Spanish national as envoy to a country where Portugal supposedly had exclusive interests, that should be preserved, in the framework of the distribution of powers agreed between Portugal and Spain, since the beginning of the dynastic union between the two countries, in 1580.

On his return to Lisbon, Azevedo was held in custody and put on trial on several accusations, including embezzlement. Dom Jerónimo de Azevedo died on 9 March 1625, in São Jorge Castle, before the conclusion of his trial and without the various allegations against him being proven. He was buried in São Roque Church in Lisbon, which was then the home church of the Jesuits in Portugal.

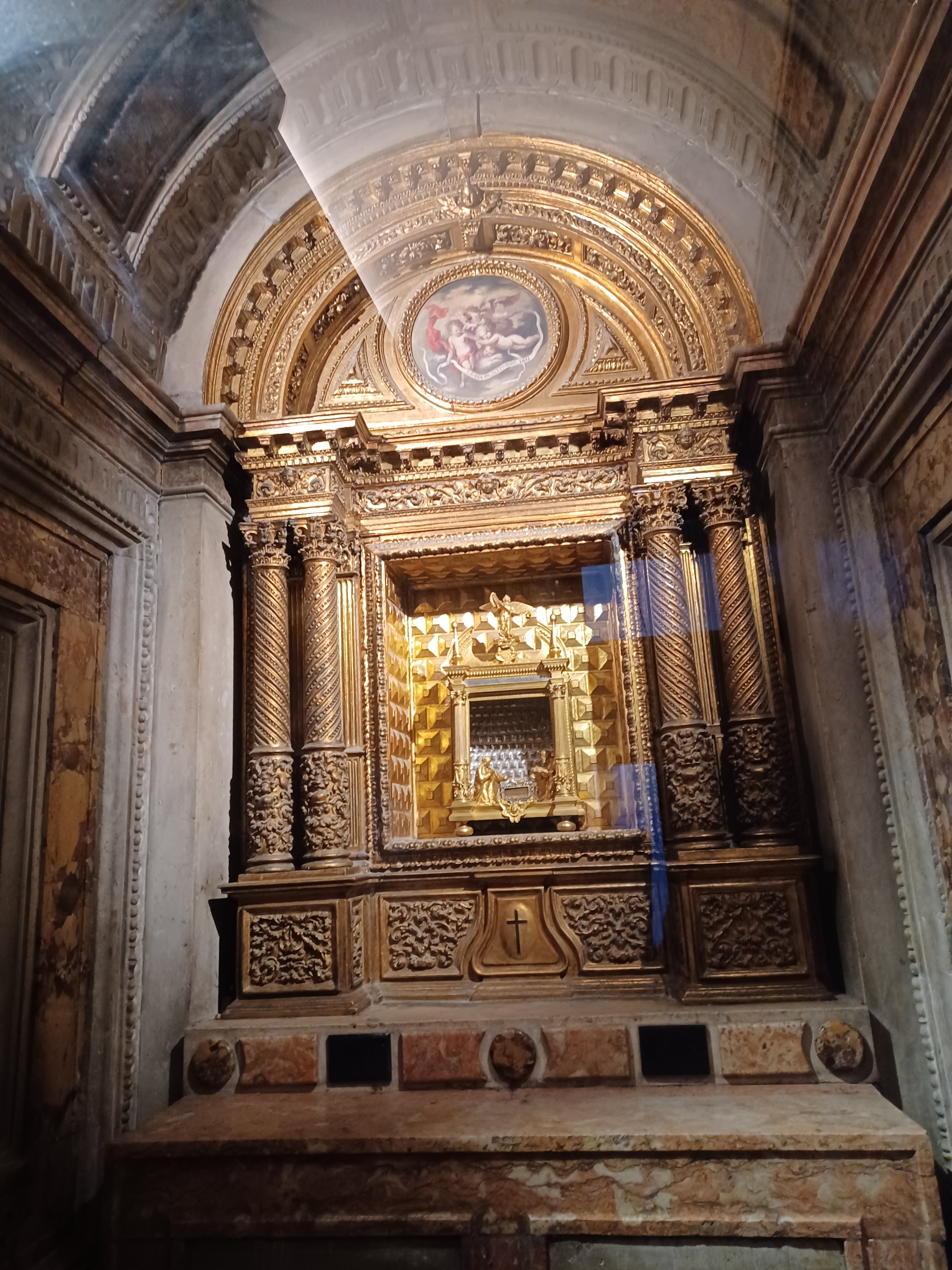
The nativity chapel, in the Igreja de São Roque, in Lisbon, where D. Jerónimo de Azevedo is buried

== Legacy ==
Azevedo lived at a time when the Portuguese Empire in the East was already past its heyday and relatively weakened by the arrival to Asian waters of other European powers. But military successes in the 1590s against the Kingdoms of Sitawaka and Jaffna presented the Portuguese crown with a unique window of opportunity that led it to decide (in 1594) to attempt the conquest of the entire island of Ceylon. The martial qualities of the governors were thus paramount, and this is the likely reason that explains Azevedo's long tenure in Colombo, followed by his promotion to viceroy in Goa in 1611.

Azevedo had attempted to resign from captain general of Ceylon in 1597 and later on, in February 1603, he was also the target of an inquiry ("devassa") conducted by the Archbishop of Goa, for alleged misappropriation of resources. However, as early as 15 March 1603, the king was already writing to the Archbishop to request the postponement of the inquiry, since in the meantime he had received favorable informations from the bishop of Cochin concerning Azevedo's military campaigns on the island. Clearly, the king did not want the good military results of governor to be undermined, and in the end he granted to Dom Jerónimo a reward of 10,000 reais and a comenda in the Order of Christ. By that time, Azevedo had already acquired in Ceylon the equivalent of the power and mystique of a viceroy.

But Azevedo was more than a military leader, for he undertook important political initiatives (such as the negotiations that led to the Malvana Convention) and missionary reforms (opening of Ceylon to the Jesuits) while in Colombo - and he strongly supported geographical exploration and scientific activities during his tenure in Goa. On balance, it is likely that - more than the accusations of embezzlement (a quite common feature of many previous tenures of governors and viceroys of the Portuguese Empire) - it was his politically risky actions against a personal envoy of the king of Spain and Portugal that sealed his final fall from grace in the Habsburg court.

The Fort of São Jerónimo (Saint Jerome) in Nani Daman was started during his term as viceroy and is named in his honor.

Azevedo was also responsible for the rebuilding of the Idalcão or Adilshahi Palace in Panaji (Goa).

The Portuguese city of Porto named a street after him.

== Bibliography ==
- Tikiri Abeyasinghe, Portuguese Rule in Ceylon, 1594 - 1612 Lake House Investments Ltd. Publishers, 1966 edition, Colombo, passim.
- Frederick Charles Danvers, The Portuguese in India: Being a History of the Rise and Decline of Their Eastern Empire: Volume 2, 1894 edition by W. H. Allen & Co., London, page 198
- A. R. Disney, A History of Portugal and the Portuguese Empire: From Beginnings to 1807 (Volume 2) Cambridge University Press; 1st edition (13 April 2009), pages 154, 166–167, 168, 191 ISBN 0521738229
- C. Gaston Perera, Kandy Fights the Portuguese (A Military History of Kandyan Resistance), 2007, Vijith Yapa Publications, Sri Lanka, ISBN 9789551266776
- Fernão de Queiroz, The temporal and spiritual conquest of Ceylon (Volume 2), Colombo : A.C. Richards, 1930. (Originally written and published in Portuguese, 1688)
- John F. Riddick, The history of British India: a chronology, Preager Publishers, 2006.
- Senaka K. Weeraratna,Repression of Buddhism in Sri Lanka by the Portuguese (1505 - 1658)
- Chandra Tilake Edirisuriya, Azevedo -The Cruelest Portuguese

Government offices
Preceded by Pedro Lopes de Sousa	Governor of Portuguese Ceylon; 1594–1612	Succeeded by Francisco de Meneses
