= Malwana =

Coordinates: 6°56′N 80°00′E

Malwana (Sinhala: මල්වාන Tamil: மல்வான) is a town of 36,050 (estimate as of 2011) inhabitants in the Western Province of Sri Lanka. It is situated on the banks of the Kelani River, 14 km north-east of Colombo. It is part of the Gampaha District and Biyagama electoral division. Recognized all over Sri Lanka for the exotic Rambutan fruit that grows in the area, Malwana forms part of the Biyagama free-trade zone, where government incentives has drawn investors from around the world into manufacturing ventures involving clothing and light industry. Malwana Muslim area exist with several sub-areas as well as Raxapana, Vidanagoda, Malwana- Town, Daluggala, Thottam, Pallam, Kandawatta, Burulapitiya, Rajamalwatta, Malwatta, Walgama, Ulahitiwala, Pelangahawatta, Paaluwatta, Yatihena and other areas Yabaraluwa, Mapitigama, Barukanda, Wekanda, Nagahawatta.
