= Santo Antão do Tojal =

- Former civil parish
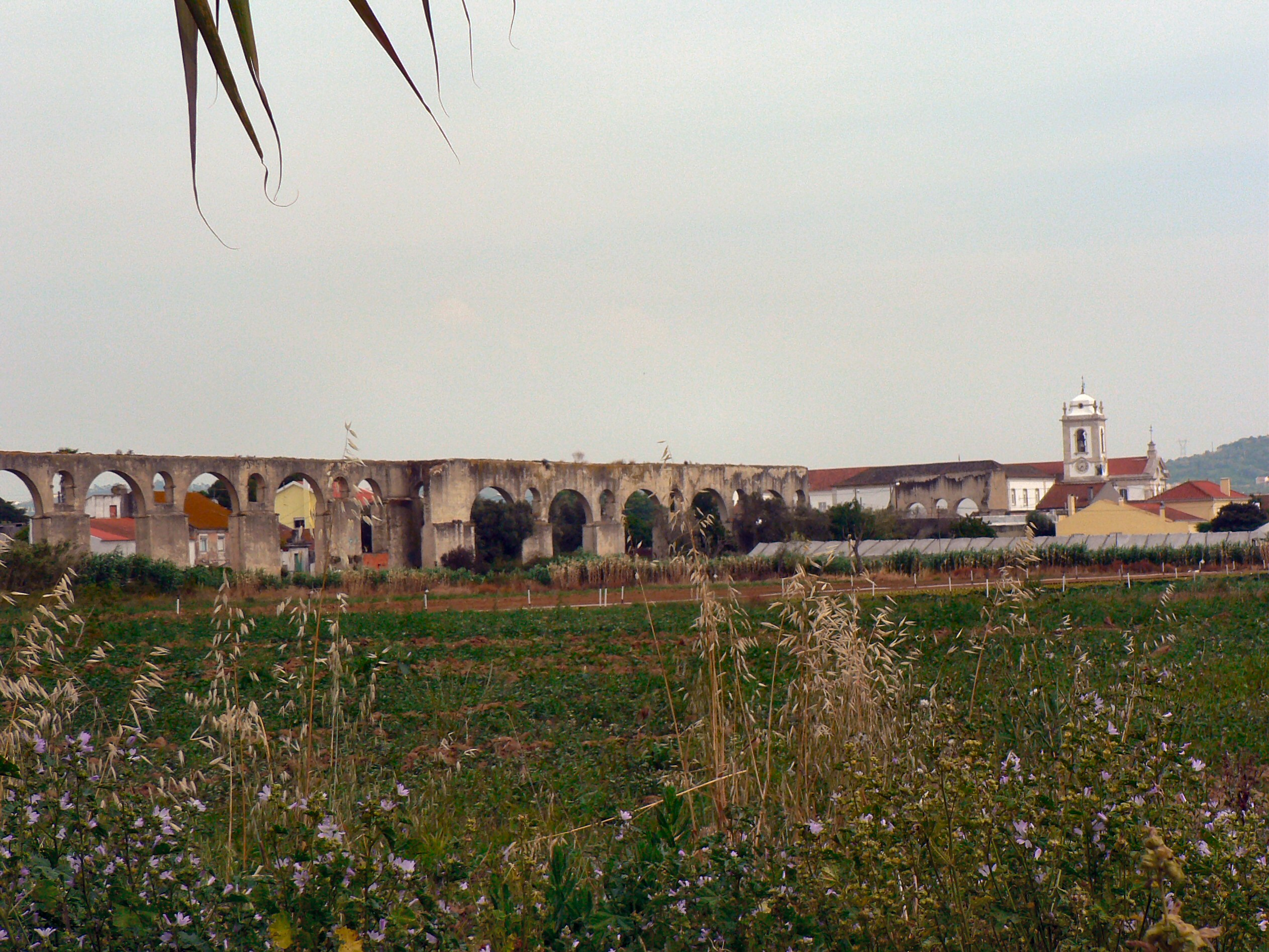
- View of the Aqueduct and Mother Church

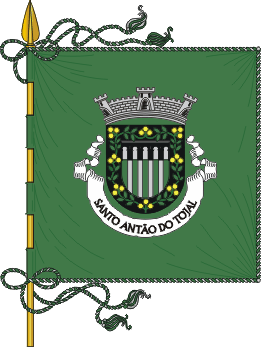
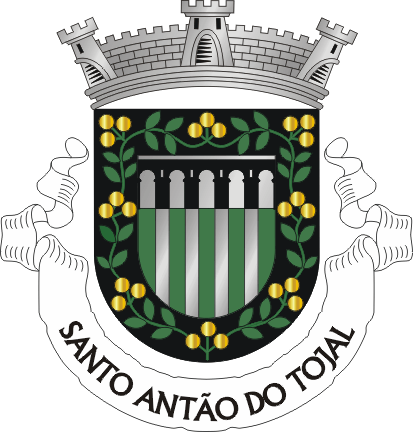
- Flag Coat of arms

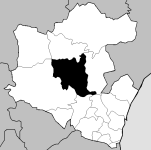
- Location in the municipality of Loures
- Country: Portugal
- Municipality: Loures
- Dissolved: 2013

Area
  - Total: 15.13 km^{2} (5.84 sq mi)

Population (2011)
  - Total: 4,216
  - Density: 278.7/km^{2} (721.7/sq mi)
- Demonym: Tojalense
- Patron saint: Saint Anthony

Santo Antão do Tojal (sometimes called Santo António do Tojal) is a Portuguese locality in the Municipality of Loures. It was the seat of the extinct Parish of Santo Antão do Tojal, which had an area of 15.13 km² and 4,216 inhabitants (2011), resulting in a population density of 278.7 inhabitants/km².

The Parish of Santo Antão do Tojal was dissolved in 2013, having been aggregated with the Parish of São Julião do Tojal to create the new União das Freguesias de Santo Antão e São Julião do Tojal.

== Geography ==
Santo Antão do Tojal included the localities of A-das-Lebres, Manjoeira, Pintéus, Quinta Nova de São Roque, Santo Antão do Tojal, and São Roque. It bordered the parishes of Bucelas, Fanhões, Frielas, Loures, São Julião do Tojal, and Unhos.

== Population ==
Population of the parish of Santo Antão do Tojal
1864	1878	1890	1900	1911	1920	1930	1940	1950	1960	1970	1981	1991	2001	2011
968	1,097	1,201	1,354	1,433	1,391	1,381	1,461	1,625	1,796	2,491	3,614	4,236	4,192	4,216

In the years 1864 and 1878, it belonged to the municipality of Olivais, which was extinguished by decree on 22 July 1886.

== History ==
Formerly called Santo António de Santo Antão do Tojal, the town is known for having served as a summer residence for the Archbishops (later Patriarchs of Lisbon), who erected the Palace of the Mitra (Palace of the Mitre) here.

The famed Portuguese botanist Félix de Avelar Brotero (1744–1828) was born in Santo Antão do Tojal. The poet Maria Amália Vaz de Carvalho (1847–1921) resided in the parish during her childhood. In her honor, the Loures City Council established a literary prize bearing her name. Other notables include Sebastião Gonçalves Tibau, a 17th-century filibuster, and Augusto Dias da Silva (1887–1928), who served as Minister of Finance in 1919.

== Heritage ==
- Pillory of Santo Antão do Tojal
- Palace of the Mitra (or Palace of the Archbishops), including the old church, the monumental fountain, the aqueduct, and the dovecote existing in the palace's estate with its decorative azulejos, as well as the gate providing direct entry to the estate. * Palace of Pintéus, including the Chapel of Our Lady of the Presentation.
- Manueline Portal.
- Quinta de Nossa Senhora da Conceição.

== Heraldry ==
Santo Antão do Tojal uses the following flag and coat of arms:

A field Vert, with four pallets Argent. Chief Argent, charged with an aqueduct of five arches Sable. Bordure Sable charged with eight branches of three oranges Or, leaved and tied by trunks Vert. A Mural crown of three towers Argent. A white scroll with the legend in black: "SANTO ANTÃO DO TOJAL". Flag green; cords and tassels silver and green.

== Institutions ==
- Casa do Gaiato
