= Battle of Pooneryn =

1993 battle of the Sri Lankan Civil War

- Part of the Sri Lankan civil war
Date	11–14 November 1993
Location	Pooneryn, Sri Lanka
Result	Tamil Tiger Victory

Belligerents
Sri Lanka	Liberation Tigers of Tamil Eelam

Commanders and leaders
Cecil Waidyaratne, Rohan Daluwatte, T.T.R. de Silva; U. Hemapala †	Theepan; Bhanu

Units involved
Sri Lanka Armed Forces; Sri Lanka Army; Sri Lanka Light Infantry; 1st Battalion; Gajaba Regiment; 3rd Battalion; Sri Lanka Armoured Corps; 4th Armoured Regiment; Commando Regiment; 2nd Commando Regiments; 3rd Commando Regiments; 58 Division; Sri Lanka Navy	Liberation Tigers of Tamil Eelam; Sea Tigers; Black Tigers; Women's Wing

Casualties and losses
241 killed, 500 wounded, 400 missing (SL Government claims); A Pucara and 2 helicopters was damaged	~500 killed (SL Government claims); 460 killed (LTTE claims)

The Battle of Pooneryn (LTTE code-named Operation Thavalai Paachchal (Frog Leap)) took place between the militant Liberation Tigers of Tamil Eelam (LTTE or Tamil Tigers) and the Sri Lankan military during the Sri Lankan Civil War for control of the military base in Pooneryn in northern Sri Lanka from 11 November to 14 November 1993.

The LTTE launched a surprise attack, code-named Operation Thavalai (Frog), on the government-controlled area of Pooneryn, overrunning the garrison and capturing military hardware before withdrawing against military reinforcements introduced through sea borne landings.

== Background ==
Following the withdrawal of the Indian Peace Keeping Force, the Sri Lanka Army expanded its presence in the Pooneryn area establishing a permanent base in 1991 to counter LTTE movements across the Kilali lagoon from the Jaffna peninsula which was under its control. The Sri Lanka Navy deployed a detachment at Pooneryn to monitor and interdict LTTE movements in the Kilali lagoon.

=== The military base ===
By November 1993, the military base in Pooneryn with a naval detachment at Nagasivanthurei consisted of 55 officers and 2100 men. The army garrison at Poonaryn consisted of troops from the 1st Battalion, Sri Lanka Light Infantry under the command of its commanding officer, Major T.T.R. de Silva and 3rd Battalion, Gajaba Regiment under the command of its as its second in command Major U. Hemapala, as well as a Saber Troop from the 4th Armoured Regiment, Sri Lanka Armoured Corps with two T-55A main battle tanks. The navy had stationed five inshore patrol crafts at Nagasivanthurei.

=== LTTE preparations ===
The military bases in Pooneryn and Elephant Pass effectively blocked LTTE movements between Wanni and Jaffna. President D. B. Wijetunge's government increased the pressure on the LTTE. The LTTE began secretly planning an attack on Pooneryn, preparing for several months. On 24 September 1993, the military launched Operation Yal Devi to eliminate LTTE boat landing sites around Kilali. The Ministry of Defense claimed 108 soldiers were killed in the operation and 350 LTTE cadres were killed, LTTE confirmed only 96 of its cadres were killed. Six weeks later the LTTE launched Operation Thavalai to destroy the isolated military base in Pooneryn and the detachment at Nagathevanthurai. Weapons captured from Janakapura were put into use.

== Battle ==
=== Initial assault ===
On 11 November, around 2:00 a.m., the LTTE launched a massive attack from land and the lagoon with 600 cadres, simultaneously engaging the Nagathevanthurai naval detachment and the army defence lines in Pooneryn. LTTE leader Colonel Bhanu led the assault on Nagathevanthurai, while Colonel Theepan led the assault on Pooneryn. The garrison was taken by surprise as it had not expected an amphibious assault from the lagoon. The LTTE infiltrated a specially trained group of cadres through the forward defence lines, with the mission of overrunning the mortar positions and the two T55 tanks. The infiltration groups were successful in capturing the mortar and armour positions in the initial phase of the assault. Within hours the forward lines were breached and the perimeter of the military base came under attack. The naval detachment was overrun and its installations including a radar station were destroyed. Heavy fire from LTTE anti-aircraft guns prevented air-support dispatched by the Sri Lanka Air Force. By dawn, large parts of the base were overrun, including the base armoury, which was emptied by the LTTE, who had also captured the two T55 tanks. The LTTE had planned to capture a tank in the battle. Some army units still managed to hold out in bunkers along the shore. Most of the troops fighting back formed independent groups. With the battalion headquarters of the 3rd Gajaba being overrun, the garrison lost contact with the Northern Command under Major General Rohan Daluwatte at the Palaly Military Base. Remaining units that regrouped around the battalion headquarters of the 1st Sri Lanka Light Infantry were able finally to contact the Elephant Pass Military Base.

=== Relief operation ===
Following the attack, the three service commanders flew to Palaly, setting up their operational joint headquarters there to plan relief for the besieged garrison. Due to heavy anti-aircraft fire from the LTTE, air support was difficult, with one SLAF aircraft being damaged due to anti-aircraft fire, but the pilot managed to land the aircraft at SLAF Palaly. Since it was not possible to air drop relief troops, plans were drawn up for an amphibious operation. With heavy resistance, the navy executed an amphibious landing on 14 November. With covering fire from Shanghai class fast gunboats, the newly formed Special Boat Squadron, led by Lieutenant Commander Ravindra Wijegunaratne carried out the initial landings from two inshore patrol craft securing a beachhead. This was followed with the landing of troops from the army. Troops broke out of the beachhead and linked up with surviving pockets of resistance from the original garrison. With the inflow reinforcements, the LTTE withdrew.

== Aftermath ==
The LTTE withdrew by the evening of the 14 November and the army re-established its base in Pooneryn. The Army Commander Lieutenant General Cecil Waidyaratne and the Northern Area Commander Major General Rohan Daluwatte visited the base on 15 November 1993. Although the LTTE failed to hold on to the area it captured and was forced to withdraw, it had inflicted considerable damage to the military. The naval detachment at Nagathevanthurai was overrun, with all five inshore patrol crafts being lost as two were sunk and three were captured by the LTTE. The navy radar station was also destroyed. The LTTE had overrun the gun and armour placements, capturing a 120mm heavy mortar, 50.cal machine guns and the two T55 tanks. The SLAF was able to destroy one of these tanks by an air strike shortly afterwards, but the other tank was used by the LTTE until the last days of the war when it was destroyed. Having captured the base armoury, the LTTE removed large quantities of other arms and ammunition, which it used for attacks it carried out thereafter. The military had suffered heavy casualties with local media reporting 241 soldiers, including eight officers, killed in the fighting, and another four officers and 396 soldiers missing in action, since presumed dead. The Ministry of Defence records 229 killed which included 10 officers, 561 wounded and 92 missing The military claimed that over 500 LTTE cadres were killed, while the LTTE only acknowledged over 100 killed. The 3rd Gajaba had suffered 149 killed and 115 missing, which included 4 officers and its second in command Major U. Hemapala who was posthumously promoted to the rank of lieutenant colonel. The remaining personal 3rd Gajaba were transferred to Palay and reformed. Major T.T.R. de Silva of the 1st Sri Lanka Light Infantry was given a field promotion for preventing the complete fall of the garrison. The 1st Sri Lanka Light Infantry had lost four officers including Major Panduka Wanasinghe, who was the nephew of General Hamilton Wanasinghe. Two officers, Lieutenant A.W.M.N.M. De Silva of the 1st Sri Lanka Light Infantry and Lieutenant K. W. T. Nissanka of the 3rd Gajaba were posthumously award the Weera Wickrama Vibhushanaya second highest award for combat bravery, in 1996, Nissanka's award was elevated to the Parama Weera Vibhushanaya the highest decoration awarded by the Sri Lankan military. On 14 November, badly wounded, Lieutenant Nissanka, a platoon commander in the 3rd Battalion, Gajaba Regiment, which held the forward defence line till dawn, ordered the remainder of his platoon to withdraw with its wounded and to cover the withdrawal he ran at the attacking enemy with two primed grenades, killing himself and enemy fighters in the process.

=== Court of inquiry ===
Lieutenant General Waidyaratne appointed a court of inquiry (CoI) into the incident headed by Brigadier T. N. De Silva. The CoI found several senior officers at fault, which included Brigadier Lionel Balagalle, Director of Military Intelligence; Brigadier Shantha Kottegoda and Major General Rohan Daluwatte for their failure to prevent a major attack by the LTTE. Major General Rohan Daluwatte had claimed that five battalions from his command had been moved to the Eastern Province to conduct facilitate elections, contributed to the disaster. The transfer was ordered by the General Hamilton Wanasinghe, the general officer commanding (GOC) of the Joint Operations Headquarters (JOH) which could not be countermanded by Lieutenant General Waidyaratne. Lieutenant General Waidyaratne refuted these by stating the Daluwatte should have managed with resources at his disposal which included 31,370 troops under the Northern Command at the time of the attack. The CoI found fault with Colonel T.T.R. de Silva and Lieutenant Colonel S.W.L. Daulagalab for shortcomings in the preparedness of the Pooneryn base to face such an attack, with over 600 of the troops stationed at the time being fresh recruits and disciplinary action hadn't been taken following the Battle of Janakapura in July 1993 which had found fault with Major General Rohan Daluwatte and three others. The report of the CoI was present to the President on 31 December 1993. General Waidyaratne accepted much of the blame and stepped down as Army Commander, retiring in December 1993.

=== Disappearance of captured soldiers ===
In November 1993, Amnesty International appealed to the LTTE to publicly acknowledge if it had captured any soldiers during the battle and to treat any under the terms of the Geneva Conventions and allow access to International Committee of the Red Cross (ICRC), after the Sri Lankan military claimed that about 70 soldiers had been taken prisoner by the LTTE during the battle. In March 1994, the LTTE responded to this appeal, however Amnesty International claimed that there was a discrepancy in the number of prisoners it claimed and allowed the ICRC to visit and feared that the LTTE has given access to the ICRC to all prisoners it had taken in battles. The US State Department has stated the 200 security force personnel captured by the LTTE during the battle has since disappeared and believed to be dead. The UK Home Office claimed in the Court of Appeal that in the Pooneryn attack the LTTE murdered prisoners of war. The LTTE held captive several soldiers captive since the battle, subjected to tortured and ill treatment until they were released in 2001. Private D. K. Hemapala died in captivity due to poor treatment.

== Withdrawal and recapture of Pooneryn ==
In mid 1996, the military withdrew its garrison from Pooneryn due to tactical reasons, leaving the LTTE to occupy the area and use it to launch attacks on Sri Lankan government controlled area in Jaffna, the Palali Airbase was subjected to artillery fire from Pooneryn. In late 2008 the Sri Lanka Army launched a fresh offensive in the north of the island. The units of the Task Force 1 (58 Division) recaptured the Pooneryn area on 15 November 2008.

== See also ==
- List of Sri Lankan Civil War battles
- Battle of Weli Oya (1995)
- Battle of Mullaitivu (1996)
