= Sri Lanka Army Seva Vanitha Unit =

Welfare branch of the Sri Lanka Army

- ශ්‍රී ලංකා යුද්ධ හමුදා සේවා වනිතා ඒකකය
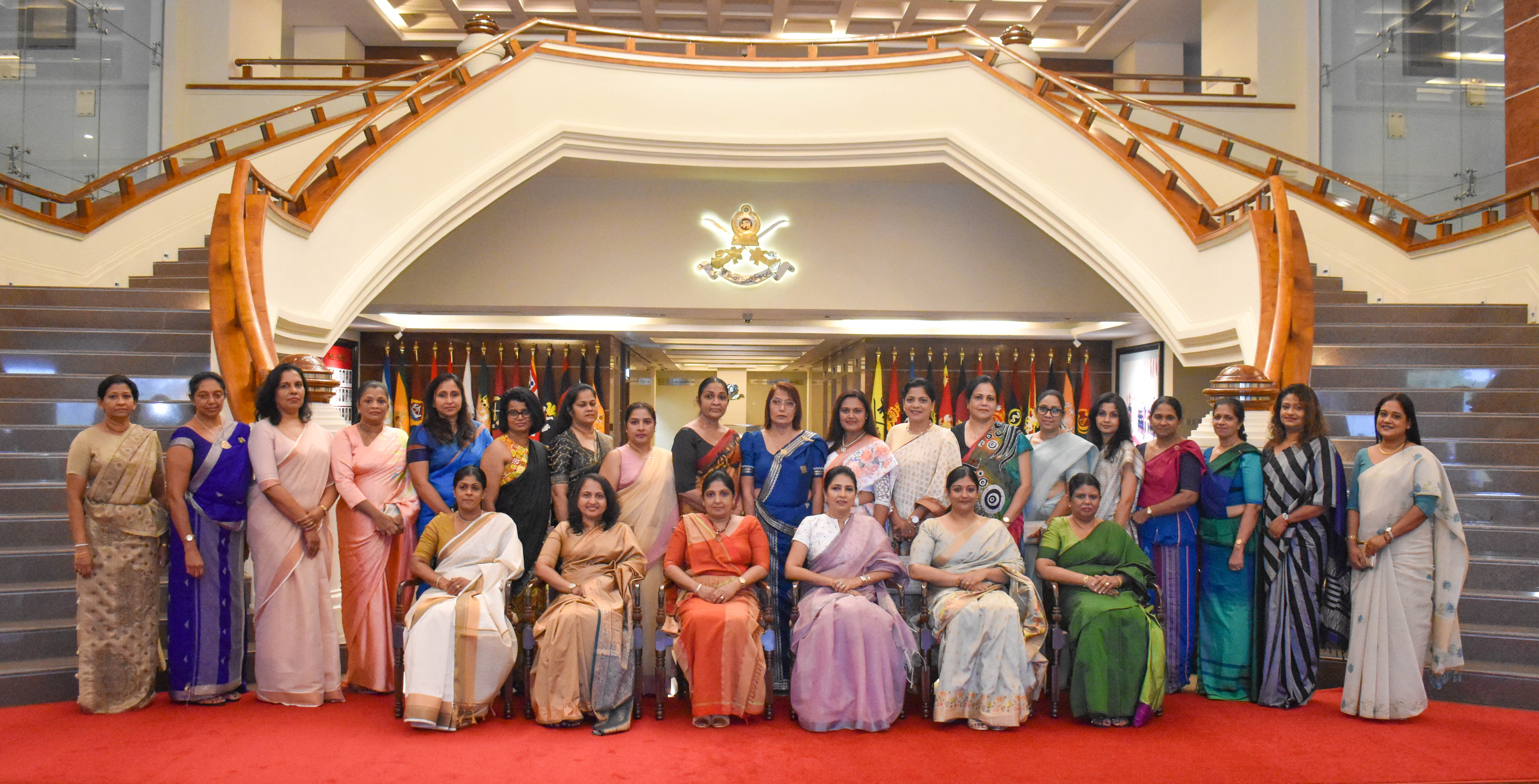
- Seva Vanitha Unit President with the Presidents of Regimental Branches
- Active: 1984 – present
- Country: Sri Lanka
- Branch: Sri Lanka Army
- Type: Welfare
- Garrison/HQ: Army Headquarters
- Website: https://alt.army.lk/sevavanitha

Commanders
- President: Swendrini Dissanayake (Commander of the Army Lt. Gen. Lasantha Rodrigo's wife)

Insignia
- Flag

Inaugurated on 12 July 1984, the Sri Lanka Army Seva Vanitha Unit (Sinhala: ශ්‍රී ලංකා යුද්ධ හමුදා සේවා වනිතා ඒකකය, romanized: śrī laṁkā yuddha hamudā sēvā vanitā ēkakaya) functions with the main objective of providing welfare facilities to the family and relatives of service personnel who died, went missing in action or were injured whilst serving in the army in addition to empowering the families of the serving army personnel. Traditionally the organisation functions under the leadership of the wife of the serving Commander of the Army, and the members are the spouses of army officers as well as female officers. The organisation extends to 24 regimental branches functioning under the patronage of the wives of the respective regimental commanders.

== Projects ==
The Sri Lanka Army Seva Vanitha Unit conducts various welfare projects such as Viru Kekulu pre-schools, daycare centres, welfare shops, bakeries and salons, with the committed contribution of the dedicated membership. Construction of houses, endowment of educational scholarships and assisting in times of natural disasters, are done at both organisational and regimental levels. The volunteer service extended by the spouses of the army officers whilst multitasking at their roles as wives, mothers and professionals, is an immense strength to Sri Lanka Army.

== Branches ==
All 24 regiments of the Sri Lanka Army have a Seva Vanitha branch. Those branches are led by the wives of respective regimental commanders. The society of the wives of respective regimental commanders are also known as Regimental Ladies' Clubs.

== List of presidents ==
Name	Spouse (Commander of the Army)	Took office	Left office
Sonia Weeratunge	General Tissa Weeratunga VSV	12 July 1984	11 Feb 1985
Mala Seneviratne	General Nalin Seneviratne VSV	12 Feb 1985	15 Aug 1988
Ira Wanasinghe	General Hamilton Wanasinghe VSV	16 Aug 1988	15 Nov 1991
Thilaka Waidyarathna	General Cecil Waidyaratne VSV	16 Nov 1991	31 Dec 1993
Lalitha De Silva	General G. H. De Silva RWP, VSV, USP	01 Jan 1994	30 Apr 1996
Jayanthi Daluwatta	General Rohan Daluwatte RWP, RSP, VSV, USP	1 May 1996	15 Dec 1998
Dilhani Weerasooriya	General C. S. Weerasooriya RWP, RSP, VSV, USP	16 Dec 1998	24 Aug 2000
Gnana Balagalle	General Lionel Balagalle RWP, RSP, VSV, USP, VSP	25 Aug 2000	30 Jun 2004
Sonia Kottegoda	General Shantha Kottegoda WWV, RWP, RSP, VSV, USP, VSP	1 July 2004	05 Dec 2005
Anoma Fonseka	General Sarath Fonseka RWP, RSP, VSV, USP	06 Dec 2005	15 July 2009
Manjulika Jayasuriya	General Jagath Jayasuriya VSV, USP	16 July 2009	16 July 2009
Damayanthi Ratnayake	General Daya Ratnayake WWV, RWP, RSP, USP	01 Aug 2013	21 February 2015
Nayana De Silva	General Crishantha de Silva RWP, USP	22 Feb 2015	14 July 2017
Chandrika Senanayake	General Mahesh Senanayake RWP, RSP, VSV, USP	14 July 2017	18 Aug 2019
Sujeewa Nelson	General Shavendra Silva WWV, RWP, RSP, USP	18 Aug 2019	31 May 2022
Janaki Liyanage	General Vikum Liyanage RWP, RSP, ndu	3 June 2022	30 December 2024
Swendrini Dissanayake	Lieutenant General Lasantha Rodrigo RSP, ctf - ndu, psc, IG	31 December 2024	Incumbent

== See also ==
- Sri Lanka Navy Seva Vanitha Unit
- Sri Lanka Air Force Seva Vanitha Unit
