= Jayanath =

Jayanath is both a given name and a surname. Notable people with the name include:

- Jayanath Colombage, Sri Lankan flag officer
- Jayanath Lokuketagodage, Sri Lanka Army officer
- Jayanath Sandacan, Sri Lankan cricketer
- G. S. Jayanath (died 1997), Sri Lanka Army officer
