= Mahesh Senanayake =

Sri Lanka Army general

General NUMMW Senanayake RWP, RSP, VSV, USP
- මහේෂ් සේනානායක
- Military career
- Allegiance: Sri Lanka
- Branch: Sri Lanka Army
- Service years: 1983 – 2019
- Rank: General
- Service number: O/60050
- Units: Special Forces Regiment; Sri Lanka Engineers
- Commands: Commander of the Army; Chief of Staff, Sri Lanka Army; Jaffna Security Forces; 52 Division; Special Forces Brigade; 211 Infantry Brigade; Regimental Center Commandant, Special Forces Regiment; 3rd Special Forces Regiment; 1st Special Forces Regiment
- Conflicts: Sri Lankan Civil War; Insurrection 1987-89
- Awards: Rana Wickrama Padakkama; Rana Sura Padakkama; Vishista Seva Vibhushanaya; Uttama Seva Padakkama
- Website: maheshsenanayake.org

General N.U.M. Mahesh W. Senanayke, RWP, RSP, VSV, USP is a retired Sri Lankan Army senior officer who served as the Commander of the Sri Lanka Army from 2017 to 2019. Senanayake had previously been the Commander, Security Forces Headquarters – Jaffna, General Officer Commanding, 52 Division and Brigade Commander, Special Forces Brigade. Having started his military career as a military engineer, Senanayake became a special forces officer and is a veteran of all four phases of the Sri Lankan civil war, having served in both its Northern and Eastern theaters.

Following his retirement, Senanayake contested the 2019 Sri Lankan presidential election as a third-party candidate and came in fourth place.

== Education ==
Educated at Ananda College, Colombo, he holds a Bachelor of Science in Civil Engineering from Jawaharlal Nehru University, Pune and is a graduate of the United States Army Command and General Staff College.

== Military career ==
=== Early career ===
Senanayake enlisted in the Sri Lanka Army through its 16th Officer Cadet Intake (long course) on 16 October 1981 at the Sri Lanka Military Academy in Diyatalawa. Subsequent to completing his training, Senanayake was commissioned as a Second Lieutenant in the Corps of Engineers, joining the 1st Plant Engineer Regiment on 23 June 1983. He would go on to become a Troop Commander and a Squadron Commander in the same regiment, as well as being posted as an instructor at Sri Lanka Military Academy. In 1989, he took an inter-unit transfer to the Special Forces Regiment, where he served as Squadron Commander in the 1 Special Forces Regiment (1 SF). In August 1996, Major Senanayake was appointed the first commanding officer of the newly formed 3 Special Forces Regiment (3 SF) which soon specialized in Long Range Reconnaissance Patrols.

=== Higher command ===
Staff appointments he has undertaken include postings at the office of the Colonel - General Staff, 52nd Division; Brigadier - General Staff at Security Force Headquarters- Jaffna (SFHQ-J); and Directing Staff at the Defence Services Command and Staff College, Sapugaskanda. From 2000 to 2004 Lieutenant Colonel Senanayake served as the Brigade Commander, Special Forces Brigade. In 2006, having attained the rank of Brigadier, he was appointed Director Plans at Army Headquarters, going on to work with the US Army as Senior Manager, Project Management of Afghan Operations and Strategic Planning for Civil Reserved Air Fleet (CRAF). Senanyake has also held the positions of Regimental Center Commandant of the Special Forces Regiment, Brigade Commander of the 211 Infantry Brigade: Vavuniya, and General Officer Commanding the 52 Division in Varani, Jaffna.

=== Reinstatement ===
Following the results of the 2010 presidential elections, in which his former commandant Sarath Fonseka failed to defeat incumbent president Mahinda Rajapaksa, Senanayake fled the country, fearing reprisals from the Rajapakses. He returned to Sri Lanka following Maithripala Sirisena's victory over Rajapaksa in the 2015 presidential election, and was reinstated and appointed Military Secretary at Sri Lanka Army headquarters in February that year. In 2016, he was appointed Commander, SFHQ-J, during which tenure he was responsible for overseeing the ongoing resettlement of Internally Displaced Persons (IDPs) from the civil war in the Jaffna peninsula.

=== Commander of Sri Lanka Army ===
Major General Senanayake was appointed the Army Chief of Staff on 22 March 2017, and was then promoted to the rank of Lieutenant General and Army Commander by order of President Maithripala Sirisena on 4 July 2017. During his tenure the army was mobilised and deployed on several occasions, in aid of civilian authorities when a state of emergency was declared as a result of the 2018 anti-Muslim riots and the 2019 Easter bombings bring the security situation under control. On 21 August 2019, he retired from the army, having been promoted to the rank of General. He was succeeded as Army Commander by Major General Shavendra Silva, the Chief of Staff of the army.

== Political career ==
Senanayake entered politics after his retirement from the army. He contested the 2019 Sri Lankan presidential election as a candidate of the National People's Party, and was endorsed by the National People's Movement. He finished as the fourth-most voted candidate in the election. Following his defeat, Senanayake assured voters that his party would contest as a group of professionals and intellectuals in the 2020 parliamentary elections.

== Honors and decorations ==
Senanayake has been awarded the Rana Wickrama Padakkama with bar and the Rana Sura Padakkama with bar for gallantry and the Vishista Seva Vibhushanaya and the Uttama Seva Padakkama for distinguished service.

| Rana Wickrama Padakkama (with bar) | Rana Sura Padakkama (with bar) | Vishista Seva Vibhushanaya | Uttama Seva Padakkama |
| Eastern Humanitarian Operations Medal (with clasp) | Northern Humanitarian Operations Medal (with clasp) | Purna Bhumi Padakkama | North and East Operations Medal |
| Riviresa Campaign Services Medal (with clasp) | 50th Independence Anniversary Commemoration Medal | Sri Lanka Army 50th Anniversary Medal | Sri Lanka Armed Services Long Service Medal (with clasp) |

His badges include: the Special Forces Regiment Badge and Tab, Sri Lanka Engineers Badge, Special Forces Badge, Parachute Badge, Qualified in Command and Staff Course Badge and the Special Forces (Gold) Service Appraisal Badge.

In November 2021, he was inducted into the United States Army Command and General Staff College International Hall of Fame.

== Personal life ==
Senanayake is married, and has two daughters and a son.

Military offices
| Preceded by Crishantha de Silva | Commander of the Army; July 2017 - August 2019 | Succeeded by Shavendra Silva |
| Preceded by Ubaya Madawela | Chief of Staff of the Army (Sri Lanka); March 2017 - July 2017 | Succeeded by Amal Karunasekara |
