= Chief of the Defence Staff (Sri Lanka) =

Former armed forces head of Sri Lanka

- Sri Lanka Armed Forces
- Constituting instrument: Chief of Defence Staff Act, No. 35 of 2009
- Formation: 11 February 1985 as General Officer Commanding, Joint Operations Command
- First holder: General Tissa Weeratunga (as GOC-JOC)
- Final holder: General Shavendra Silva
- Abolished: 31 December 2024; 20 months ago
- Website: Official website

The Chief of the Defence Staff (CDS) was the most senior appointment in the Sri Lankan Armed Forces, and the highest-ranking military officer in service, outranking the heads of each service branch. The CDS had not operational command authority over service branches, but rather oversaw inter-service co-operation and developed and implemented the joint operations doctrine of the Sri Lankan armed forces. Coordination of inter-service joint operations were handled by the Office of the Chief of the Defence Staff, formally known as the Joint Operations Headquarters.

The CDS was the Chairman of a Committee made up of service commanders and is a member of the National Security Council.

Its subordinate command was known as the Overall Operational Command.

== History ==
The post could be traced back to post of general officer commanding (GOC) of the Joint Operations Command when General T. I. Weerathunga was first appointed to it on November 2, 1985. The Joint Operations Command was created in 1985 due to a need to co-ordinate of joint operations among the tri-services and the police with the escalation of the Sri Lankan Civil War. The post itself was created in 1999 replacing the civilian post of chief of the Joint Operations Bureau which had existed briefly in 1999. Its powers expanded under the Chief of Defence Staff Act No. 35 of 2009.

The Chief of the Defence Staff was appointed to the highest rank in the branch of the Sri Lankan armed forces to which he belonged (equivalent to a British "four-star" rank) being a General, an Admiral or an Air Chief Marshal. According to the new Bill, the president of Sri Lanka appointed to the post of Chief of Defence Staff any person serving as Commander of the Army, Navy or the Air Force, to function under the direction, supervision and control of the permanent secretary to the Ministry of Defence.

== Responsibilities ==
- Assist in providing for the strategic direction of the armed forces
- Development of doctrine for the joint employment of the armed forces
- Facilitation of preparation of strategic plans for the armed forces
- Co-ordination of matters relating to intelligence as between the armed forces;
- To undertake assessments to determine the capabilities of the armed forces in comparison with those of their potential
- Preparation of operational plans for the armed forces

== Supporting and associated posts ==
The CDS was assisted by a chief of staff (two-star rank) and four director generals (operations and systems, training, naval and air operations, coordination) made up the Office of the Chief of the Defence Staff. In addition, the CDS had a personal staff consisting of the secretary to the CDS, two aides-de-camp, and principal staff officers.

== General officer commanding, Joint Operations Command (1985–1993) ==
No.	Picture	General officer commanding	Took office	Left office	Time in office	Defence branch	Ref.
1	T. I. Weerathunga VSV	General; T. I. Weerathunga VSV	22 February 1985	2 September 1985	192 days	Sri Lanka Army	–
2	Cyril Ranatunga VSV	General; Cyril Ranatunga VSV	5 September 1985	31 July 1988	2 years, 330 days	Sri Lanka Army	–
3	Hamilton Wanasinghe VSV, USP	General; Hamilton Wanasinghe VSV, USP	11 November 1991	6 September 1993	1 year, 299 days	Sri Lanka Army	–

== Chairman, Joint Operations Bureau (1999–2000) ==
No.	Picture	Chairman	Took office	Left office	Time in office	Defence branch	Ref.
1	Rohan Daluwatte WWV, RWP, RSP, VSV, USP	General; Rohan Daluwatte WWV, RWP, RSP, VSV, USP	4 January 1999	20 April 2000	1 year, 107 days	Sri Lanka Army	–

== Chief of the Defence Staff (2000–2024) ==
Ranks and honours are as at the completion of their tenure:

No.	Picture	Chief of Defence	Took office	Left office	Time in office	Defence branch	Ref.
1	Rohan Daluwatte WWV, RWP, RSP, VSV, USP	General; Rohan Daluwatte WWV, RWP, RSP, VSV, USP (1941–2018)	21 April 2000	9 October 2003	4 years, 278 days	Sri Lanka Army	–
2	Lionel Balagalle RWP, RSP, VSV, USP, VSP	General; Lionel Balagalle RWP, RSP, VSV, USP, VSP	10 October 2003	1 September 2005	2 years, 63 days	Sri Lanka Army	–
3	Daya Sandagiri VSV, USP	Admiral; Daya Sandagiri VSV, USP (born 1947)	1 September 2005	12 June 2006	274 days	Sri Lanka Navy	–
4	Donald Perera VSV, USP	Air Chief Marshal; Donald Perera VSV, USP (born 1950)	12 June 2006	15 July 2009	3 years, 33 days	Sri Lanka Air Force	–
5	Sarath Fonseka RWP, RSP, VSV, USP	General; Sarath Fonseka RWP, RSP, VSV, USP (born 1950)	15 July 2009	16 November 2009	124 days	Sri Lanka Army	–
6	Roshan Goonetileke RWP, VSV, USP	Air Chief Marshal; Roshan Goonetileke RWP, VSV, USP (born 1956)	16 November 2009	1 August 2013	3 years, 197 days	Sri Lanka Air Force	–
7	Jagath Jayasuriya VSV, USP	General; Jagath Jayasuriya VSV, USP	1 August 2013	15 June 2015	1 year, 318 days	Sri Lanka Army	–
8	Kolitha Gunathilake RWP, RSP, VSV, USP	Air Chief Marshal; Kolitha Gunathilake RWP, RSP, VSV, USP	16 June 2015	28 June 2017	2 years, 12 days	Sri Lanka Air Force	–
9	Crishantha de Silva RWP, USP	General; Crishantha de Silva RWP, USP	29 June 2017	22 August 2017	54 days	Sri Lanka Army	–
10	Ravindra Wijegunaratne WV, RWP, RSP, VSV, USP	Admiral; Ravindra Wijegunaratne WV, RWP, RSP, VSV, USP (born 1960)	22 August 2017	31 December 2019	2 years, 131 days	Sri Lanka Navy	
–	Shavendra Silva WWV, RWP, RSP, VSV, USP	General; Shavendra Silva WWV, RWP, RSP, VSV, USP (born 1964); Acting	2 January 2020	1 June 2022	2 years, 151 days	Sri Lanka Army	
11	Shavendra Silva WWV, RWP, RSP, VSV, USP	General; Shavendra Silva WWV, RWP, RSP, VSV, USP (born 1964)	1 June 2022	31 December 2024	2 years, 213 days	Sri Lanka Army	

== See also ==
- Office of the Chief of the Defence Staff (Sri Lanka)
- National Security Council of Sri Lanka
- Commander of the Army
- Commander of the Navy
- Commander of the Air Force
