= Shantha Kottegoda =

Sri Lankan army general

General Shantha Kottegoda ශාන්ත කෝට්ටේගොඩ WWV, RWP, RSP, VSV, USP
- Born: November 6, 1949 (age 76); Kottegoda, Southern Province, Dominion of Ceylon (now Sri Lanka)
- Spouse: Sonia
- Military career
- Allegiance: Sri Lanka
- Branch: Sri Lanka Army
- Service years: 1971–2005
- Rank: General
- Unit: Sri Lanka Light Infantry
- Commands: Commander of the Army, Security Forces Headquarters – Wanni, 55 Division, 51 Division
- Conflicts: 1971 JVP Insurrection; 1987–89 JVP Insurrection; Sri Lankan Civil War
- Awards: Uttama Seva Padakkama; Weera Wickrama Vibhushanaya; Rana Wickrama Padakkama; Rana Sura Padakkama; Vishista Seva Vibhushanaya
- Other work: Ambassador to Brazil, Ambassador to Thailand, Permanent Secretary to the Ministry of Defence

General Shantha H.S. Kottegoda, WWV, RWP, RSP, VSV, USP (born November 6, 1949) is a retired senior Sri Lanka Army officer who is currently posted as Chancellor of General Sir John Kotelawala Defence University. He was the seventeenth commander of the Sri Lankan Army from 1 July 2004 – 5 December 2005. He had served as the Sri Lankan Ambassador to Brazil and Thailand. In April 2019, following the Easter Sunday bombings he was appointed the permanent secretary to the Ministry of Defence.

Shantha Kottegoda has served the Sri Lankan Army for 35 years throughout the island. He has been involved in both the 1971 and 1987–89 JVP Insurrection as well as the Sri Lankan Civil War, participating in major operations against the LTTE in the north and east of the country. Kottegoda has held numerous positions in the army; among them he was chief of staff, colonel of the regiment of the Sri Lanka Light Infantry, general officer commanding 55 Division, 51 Division, 21 Division and served as director of military intelligence.

== Early life and education ==
Kottegoda was born to S. H. P. Kottegoda and Sheela Kottegoda on 6 November 1949, in Kottegoda, Matara, in the Southern Province of Sri Lanka. He was the second in his family, Deepthi Weerasuriya is his elder sister. Kottegoda started his schooling at St. Aloysius' College, Galle and then moving to S. Thomas' College, Mount Lavinia. He was active in many sports including cricket, athletics, hockey, rifle shooting, swimming, water polo and others, in which he excelled. He had become a cadet and by 1964 was Lance Sergeant of the junior Cadet Platoon, receiving the junior Cadet Prize for special merit that year. By 1969 he was promoted to the rank of Company Quarter Master Sergeant as well as being appointed a School Prefect, and Head Prefect of Buck House. It was this commitment to sport and discipline that prepared him for his career in the military.

== Military career ==
Kottegoda enlisted into the Sri Lankan Army in February 1970, upon his completion of his officer cadet training at the Sri Lanka Military Academy, Diyatalawa, then called the Army Training Centre. He was commissioned a second lieutenant of the 1st Battalion of the Ceylon Light Infantry in June 1971 during the 1971 JVP Insurrection. One of his reasons for joining the Army was so that he could continue to play sports. Quoted as saying "Taking part in sports, I gained confidence, improved my leadership qualities and I was fit both physically and mentally. It helped me to take decisions quickly and promptly." He also said the training he gained from playing sport taught him of fair play, justice and discipline.

In 1973, he was promoted to lieutenant and attended the Young Officers Course in India. He was promoted to captain in 1976 and attended the Battalion Support Weapon Officers Course in India (1979). Having been promoted to major in 1980 he attended the Junior Command Course (1980) as well as the CRW Course (1983) in India. During this time he had served as a company commander, adjutant of the 1st Sri Lanka Light Infantry, a staff officer, before becoming the commanding officer of the 4th Battalion, Sri Lanka Light Infantry.

He was promoted to colonel in 1991, to brigadier in 1993 and to major general in 1998. He held several senior appointments such as colonel general staff; coordinating officer for Kalutara and Mullaittivu districts; principal staff officer, Operational Headquarters at Ministry of Defence; deputy Director (Counter Terrorist Division), National Intelligence Bureau; deputy commandant, Kotelawala Defence Academy; brigade Commander, 11 Brigade, Ratnapura; Director Military Intelligence; Director Training; Director General, Training; inspector of infantry, Army Headquarters; colonel of the regiment Sri Lanka Light Infantry; director general, General Staff; commandant, Sri Lanka Army Volunteer Force.

He graduated from the Army War College, Mhow (1990-1992) and the National Defence College, India (2000). In 1997, he attended the Pacific Area Special Operation Course in Hawaii and underwent a special training course by British Security Services (M15) on intelligence and protective security.

Commanding operational formations, he served as commander 10th Brigade Group in Kayts and Pooneryn; brigade commander of the 3rd Brigade in Batticaloa and 5th Brigade in Mannar; general officer commanding, 55 Division in Jaffna, the 51 Division in Mirusuvil and the 21 Division, Pompemadu. From 2000 to 2002, he was the Security Forces Headquarters – Wanni. In 2003 he was deputy chief of staff of the Sri Lanka Army for two months, October to November.

On November 24, 2003 Kottegoda was appointed chief of staff of the Sri Lanka Army. With the escalation of hostilities within the ceasefire and peace talks, he concurrently served as overall operational commander - East; having overall command of all Armed Forces, Police and the Special Task Force units in the Eastern Province of the island. On July 1, 2004 he was appointed commander of the Sri Lankan Army by President Chandrika Kumaratunga and was promoted to the rank of lieutenant general. He was serving as army commander when he retired from the army on December 5, 2005 and having been promoted to the rank of general on his last day of service.

== Later work ==
Kottegoda served as Sri Lankan Ambassador to Brazil and thereafter as Sri Lanka Ambassador to Thailand. In April 2019, following the Easter Sunday bombings he was appointed the Permanent Secretary to the Ministry of Defence by President Sirisena, serving until November 2019 when he was succeeded by Major General Kamal Gunaratne. He has appointed the Chancellor of the General Sir John Kotelawala Defence University in December 2022.

== Family ==
Shantha Kottegoda is married to Sonia, they have a son and a daughter named Asanka and Avanthi respectively.

== Awards ==
His awards and decorations include the gallantry medals Weera Wickrama Vibhushanaya (WWV), Rana Wickrama Padakkama (RWP) and bar, Rana Sura Padakkama (RSP), distinguished service medals Vishista Seva Vibhushanaya (VSV) and Uttama Seva Padakkama (USP); long service medals Sri Lanka Armed Services Long Service Medal and Republic of Sri Lanka Armed Services Medal; campaign medals Vadamarachchi Operation Medal, Purna Bhumi Padakkama, North and East Operations Medal and Riviresa Campaign Services Medal; and President's Inauguration Medal and 50th Independence Anniversary Commemoration Medal.

== See also ==
- Sri Lankan civil war
- Commander of the Army (Sri Lanka)
- Sri Lankan Non Career Diplomats

Military offices
Preceded by Lionel Balagalle	Commander of the Sri Lankan Army; 1 July 2004 - 5 December 2005	Succeeded by Sarath Fonseka
Preceded by Lohan Gunawardena	Chief of Staff of the Sri Lankan Army; 23 November 2003 - 30 June 2004	Succeeded by Chula Seneviratne
Diplomatic posts
Preceded by ?	Sri Lankan Ambassador to Brazil; 2005–2008	Succeeded by ?
Preceded by ?	Sri Lankan Ambassador to Thailand ?–?	Succeeded by ?
