= G. H. de Silva =

Sri Lanka Army general

Gen. Gerry de Silva RWP, VSV, USP
- Born: 31 May 1940 (age 86)
- Military career
- Allegiance: Sri Lanka
- Branch: Sri Lanka Army
- Service years: 1962–1996
- Rank: General
- Unit: Gemunu Watch
- Commands: Commander of the Sri Lankan Army; Chief of Staff of the Army
- Awards: Rana Wickrama Padakkama; Vishista Seva Vibhushanaya; Uttama Seva Padakkama
- Other work: Sri Lankan High Commissioner to Pakistan

General Gerard Hector "Gerry" de Silva, RWP, VSV, USP (born 31 May 1940) was a senior Sri Lanka Army officer. He is the 5th Chancellor of General Sir John Kotelawala Defence University since 20 January 2020. He was the 13th Commander of the Sri Lankan Army and Sri Lankan High Commissioner to Pakistan.

== Early life and education ==
Born to captain (QM) G.H. de Silva of the Ceylon Light Infantry and Etta Anna Bianca de Silva, he had five siblings. Educated at Saint Joseph's College, Colombo, where he excelled in Cricket, Swimming and Water Polo.

== Military career ==
=== Early career ===
Gerry de Silva, joined the Ceylon Army on 6 May 1960 as a cadet officer and received his training at Royal Military Academy Sandhurst along with Denzil Kobbekaduwa. He was commissioned as a second lieutenant on 3 August 1962 in the Ceylon Sinha Regiment and was transferred to the newly formed Gemunu Watch a year later. In 1971, Captain de Silva was deployed in counterinsurgency operations in Monaragala during the 1971 Insurrection and thereafter served with the Task Force Anti Illicit Immigration (TaFAII) with the Gemunu Watch. He followed a Junior Command Course in Pakistan and the Senior Command Course at the Army War College, Mhow.

=== Higher command ===
In 1981 as a lieutenant colonel he was the Officer Commanding Troops Jaffna, before taking over as Commandant, Combat Training School and becoming the first Commandant of Infantry Training School. As a colonel, he served as Commander Northern Command in 1985. Brigadier G.H. de Silva served as the Principal Staff Officer, JOC; Commanded 2 Brigade Group, tasked on deception planning and holding operations, whilst being the Overall Operational Commander for the Vadamarachchi Operation in 1987. From 1988 to 1989 he served as the Colonel of the Regiment of the Gemunu Watch and attended the National Defense College, India in 1989. On his return he was appointed General officer commanding, 3 Division in January 1990 on its formation and thereafter took over the 2 Division. Thereafter he served as the Commandant of the Volunteer Force and Chief of Staff.

=== Commander of the Army ===
He was appointed Commander of the Army on 1 January 1994. During his tenure the army launched the Operation Riviresa under the command of Major General Daluwatte which was successful in re-capturing the Jaffna peninsula and pushing the LTTE to the jungles of Wanni with significant loss of men and martial. G.H. de Silva had concerns about capturing the Jaffna peninsula without a land route to supply the large number of troops needed to defend it. This was later proven when the Operation Jayasikurui failed to open the land route the army needed. He retired on 30 April 1996 being promoted to full general and was succeeded by Rohan Daluwatte.

== Honors ==
He had been awarded the Rana Wickrama Padakkama (RWP) for gallantry, the Vishista Seva Vibhushanaya (VSV) and the Uttama Seva Padakkama (USP) for distinguished service. His other medals include the Republic of Sri Lanka Armed Services Medal, Sri Lanka Army 25th Anniversary Medal, Sri Lanka Armed Services Long Service Medal, President's Inauguration Medal, Purna Bhumi Padakkama and the Vadamarachchi Operation Medal.

== Later life ==
Following his retirement, he was appointed Sri Lankan High Commissioner to Pakistan while concurrently accredited as Ambassador to Kazakhstan and Kyrgyzstan. He served in this capacity from 1996 to 1998. He was appointed the 5th Chancellor of General Sir John Kotelawala Defence University by President Gotabaya Rajapaksa with effect from 20 January 2020.

Military offices
Preceded by Cecil Waidyaratne	Commander of the Sri Lankan Army; 1994-1996	Succeeded by Rohan Daluwatte
