= Crishanthe de Silva =

Sri Lanka Army officer

General AWJC de Silva
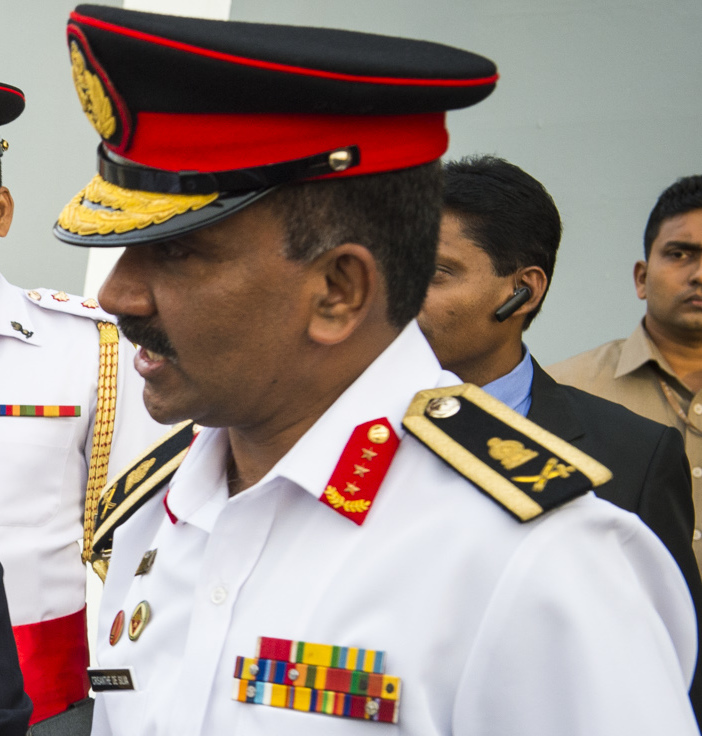
- De Silva on board the USS New Orleans
- Military career
- Allegiance: Sri Lanka
- Branch: Sri Lanka Army
- Service years: 1981–2017
- Rank: General
- Unit: Sri Lanka Engineers
- Commands: Chief of the Defence Staff, Commander of the Army, Chief of Staff, Sri Lanka Army
- Conflicts: Sri Lankan Civil War, Insurrection 1987-89
- Awards: Rana Wickrama Padakkama, Uttama Seva Padakkama

General Akurathiya Withanage Jagath Crishanthe de Silva, RWP, USP is a retired senior Sri Lanka Army officer. He served as the Commander of the Sri Lanka Army from 22 February 2015 to 4 July 2017, as the Chief of Defence Staff from 29 June 2017 to 21 August 2017. Later he was appointed the Sri Lankan High Commissioner to Bangladesh.

== Education ==
Educated at the Royal College, Colombo, De Silva received a master's degree in Defence Studies from the National Resilience Institute, Indonesia.

== Military career ==
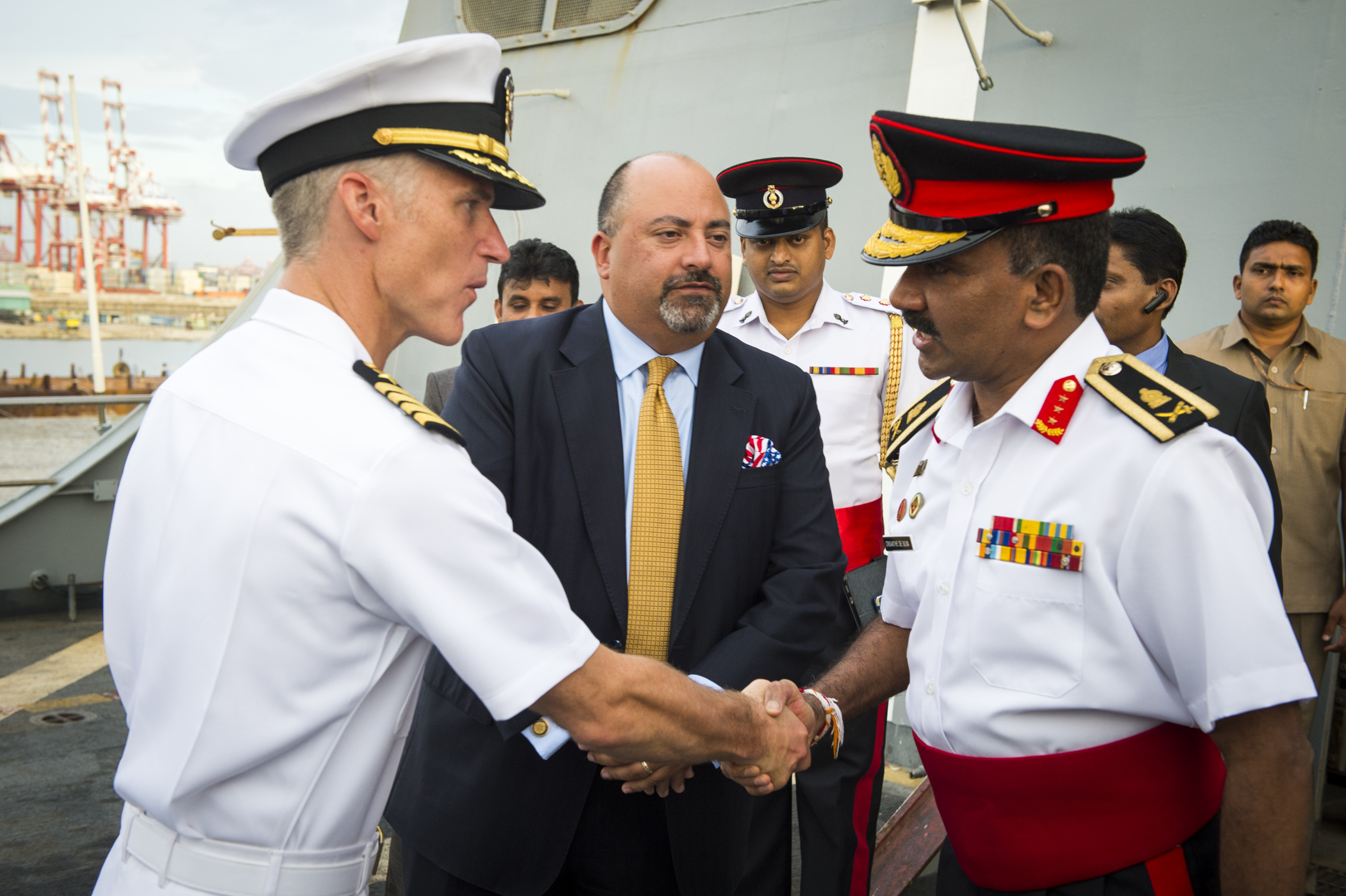
General Crishanthe (right), shaking hands with the Commanding Officer of USS New Orleans (LPD-18) Captain Glenn Jamison on July 27, 2016

De Silva joined the Sri Lanka Army as an officer cadet in February 1980 and received his basic training at the Sri Lanka Military Academy. He was commissioned as a second lieutenant in the 1st Field Engineer Regiment, Sri Lanka Engineers in 1981. He gained promotion to the ranks of captain in 1985, major 1989), lieutenant colonel (1994), colonel (1997), brigadier (2003) and major general in November 2009.

He went on to command the 6th Field Engineer Regiment and had served as the brigade commander of the Engineer Brigade, the 51-2 Infantry Brigade and the 56-2 Infantry Brigade. He had served as the commandant of the Sri Lanka School of Military Engineering, the Defence Services Command and Staff College and the Sri Lanka Military Academy. His commands include Commander Forward Maintenance Area, Wanni; Security Forces Headquarters – Kilinochchi and in the Sri Lanka Army General Staff, he had served as additional military secretary, director plans, military secretary and director operations. He had served as colonel commandant of the Corps of Sri Lanka Engineers and was a member of military delegations to Malaysia and China. He served as commander of the Sri Lanka Army Volunteer Force (SLAVF) before taking up appointment in 2013 as Chief of Staff of the Sri Lanka Army. In 2014, he was appointed deputy chief of mission in the Sri Lankan embassy in Moscow. In February 2015, he was appointed Commander of the Army and promoted to the rank of lieutenant general. In June 2017 he was promoted to the rank of general and appointed Chief of Defence Staff and served till August 2017.

He graduated from Staff College, Camberley, and the Nanjing PLA Army Command College. He has attended the bomb disposal course at the College of Military Engineering, Pune, the Engineer Company Commanders' Course at the Military College of Engineering, Pakistan, the Higher Command Course at the Army War College, Mhow, and the Advanced Security Cooperation Executive Course at the Asia-Pacific Center for Security Studies.

== Later work ==
Following his retirement, he was appointed Sri Lankan High Commissioner to the Bangladesh and served till 2019.

== Awards and decorations ==
He has been awarded the Rana Wickrama Padakkama (RWP), Uttama Seva Padakkama (USP), the Sri Lanka Armed Services Long Service Medal, the Purna Bhumi Padakkama and the North and East Operations Medal.

Rana Wickrama Padakkama	Vishista Seva Vibhushanaya		Uttama Seva Padakkama
Eastern Humanitarian Operations Medal (with clasp)	Northern Humanitarian Operations Medal (with clasp)	Purna Bhumi Padakkama	North and East Operations Medal (with clasp)
Riviresa Campaign Services Medal (with clasp)	50th Independence Anniversary Commemoration Medal	Sri Lanka Army 50th Anniversary Medal	Sri Lanka Armed Services Long Service Medal (with clasp)

His badges include: the Sri Lanka Engineers Badge, the Explosive Ordnance Disposal Badge and the De-mining Badge.

Military offices
Preceded by Kolitha Gunathilake	Chief of the Defence Staff; 29 June 2017 – 21 August 2017	Succeeded by Ravindra Wijegunaratne
Preceded by Daya Ratnayake	Commander of the Army; 22 February 2015 – 4 July 2017	Succeeded by Mahesh Senanayake
