= General's House, Colombo =

General's House
- Former names: Captain's House

General information
- Location: Bauddhaloka Mawatha (Bullers Road), Colombo, Sri Lanka
- Client: Sri Lanka Army

The General's House is the official residence of the Commander of the Sri Lanka Army, located in Colombo, Sri Lanka.

== History ==
The British Colonial Government of Ceylon constructed several Class “A” type quarters to house government officials along Bullers Road. These houses have a large drawing room, dining room, office room and four large bedrooms. These quarters are semi-detached, being divided by a hollow wall to prevent the passage of sound. Special attention have been given to ventilating the rooms, each house was provided with electric lights, fans, bells, modern sanitary fittings and was connected to the water-carriage system. One of these houses was used by the senior British Naval officer in Colombo, hence it was known as the “Captain’s House”. According to a letter dated 19 June 1947, the Ministry of Agriculture and Lands temporarily handed over the dwelling, then known as the Captain's House, to the then Commander of the Ceylon Garrison Force.

Brigadier James Roderick Sinclair, the Earl of Caithness, was appointed the first Commander of the Ceylon Army in 1949 and played a major role in establishing it as a regular army from the volunteer Ceylon Defence Force till 1952. He and his wife Gabrielle, the Countess of Caithness and their children Lady Bridget, Lady Margaret and Malcolm settled in well at “Captain’s House” at Bullers Road.

Later on Major General Richard Udugama decided to change the name of the Commander of the Army's official residence at Bullers Road (now Bauddhaloka Mawatha) from “Captain’s House” to “General’s House”. From the time of the Earl of Caithness, this became the official residence of the Commander of the Army with a short interruption when the Attorney General moved in there between Brigadier Sir Francis Reid’s departure in 1955 and Brigadier Muttukumaru’s return in January 1956.

== Guard ==
A ceremonial guard is mounted at the gates of the house when the commander is present in Colombo during day time. Traditionally the guard is drawn from the commanders parent regiment.

== See also ==
- Air House, Colombo
