= General's House =

General's House may refer to:

- General's House, Colombo in Sri Lanka.
- General's House, Nuwara Eliya in Sri Lanka.
