= Battle of Paranthan =

- Part of the Sri Lankan Civil War, 2008–2009 SLA Northern offensive
Date	December 30, 2008 – January 1, 2009
Location	Paranthan
Result	Sri Lankan Army victory

Belligerents
Sri Lanka	Liberation Tigers of Tamil Eelam

Commanders and leaders
Lt. Gen Sarath Fonseka: Maj. Gen. Jagath Jayasuriya: Brig. Shavendra Silva	Velupillai Prabhakaran

Units involved
Sri Lanka Armed Forces: Sri Lanka Army; 58 Division	Unknown

The Battle of Paranthan was a military conflict over control of Paranthan, Sri Lanka between the 58 Division of the Sri Lankan Military and the Liberation Tigers of Tamil Eelam (LTTE) as an engagement of the Northern Theatre of Eelam War IV during the Sri Lankan civil war. Fought from December 30, 2008 to January 1, 2009, the Army announced on the January 1 that it had claimed the land. The Army indicated that it had previously claimed the town in September 1996 during the campaign of Sathjaya I and Sathjaya II, but had withdrawn for tactical reason in September 1998.
