= Anoma (disambiguation) =

Anoma is a genus of gastropods. Anoma may also refer to:

== People ==
- Anoma Fonseka, wife of former commander of the Sri Lanka Army
- Anoma Gamage, Sri Lankan politician
- Anoma Janadari, Sri Lankan actress
- Anoma Sooriyaarachchi (born 1981), Sri Lankan track and field athlete
- Anoma Wijewardene, Sri Lankan artist
- Gladys Anoma (1930–2006), Ivorianscientist

== Other uses ==
- Anoma River, river in India
