= H. W. G. Wijeyekoon =

Sri Lankan military leader and diplomat (1911–1969)

- Born: Hemachandra Wickrama Gerard Wijeyekoon; 25 June 1911
- Died: April 1969 (aged 57)
- Military career
- Allegiance: Ceylon
- Branch: Ceylon Defence Force; Ceylon Army
- Service years: 1935–1949, 1949–1963
- Rank: Major General
- Service number: O/50002
- Unit: Ceylon Light Infantry
- Commands: Army Commander, Chief of Staff, 1st Battalion, Ceylon Light Infantry
- Conflicts: World War II
- Awards: OBE, Efficiency Decoration
- Other work: High Commissioner to Pakistan, Ambassador to Italy

Hemachandra Wickrama Gerard Wijeyekoon (25 June 1911 – April 1969) was a Sri Lankan military leader and diplomat. He was the second Ceylonese Commander of the Ceylon Army from 1960 to 1963 and formerly Ceylon's High Commissioner to Pakistan and Ambassador to Italy.

== Early life and education ==
He was the eldest son of Sir Gerard Wijeyekoon, former president of the Senate of Ceylon and Lady Wijeyekoon. Educated at St Joseph's College, Colombo and University of Oxford gaining a BA. Returning to Ceylon as a barrister, he enrolled as an advocate of the Supreme Court of Ceylon. Later he became a land settlement officer.

== Military career ==
=== Ceylon Defence Force ===
He was commissioned as a second lieutenant in the Ceylon Light Infantry in 1935 which was a volunteer force. With the outbreak of World War II and the mobilization of the Ceylon Defence Force he began active service, being promoted to captain in 1940. Wijeyekoon was thereafter posted to the 3rd Battalion, Ceylon Light Infantry and underwent tactical training in India. In 1942 he was promoted to major and in 1944 to lieutenant colonel, taking command of a battalion of the Ceylon Light Infantry. He was appointed commanding officer of the 2nd Battalion, Ceylon Light Infantry in January 1948 and served till October 1949.

Following Ceylon's independence in 1948 Prime Minister, D.S. Senanayake selected Lt. Col. Wijeyekoon to serve as secretary to the chief whip in the House of Representatives.

=== Ceylon Army ===
With the formation of the Ceylon Army in 1949, Lt. Col. Wijeyekoon joined the regular army in June 1950. He became the first commanding officer of the 1st Battalion, Ceylon Infantry Regiment which shortly became the 1st Battalion, Ceylon Light Infantry, serving from June 1950 to December 1953. During this time he started the tradition of toasting the motherland or the queen with Arrack. In January 1954 he took up the post of Chief of Staff of the Ceylon Army, concurrently commanding Operations Monty On 9 February 1955 he was promoted to the rank of Colonel and was acting army commander till 1 January 1956. On 17 February 1956, he was appointed as the first commandant, Ceylon Volunteer Force serving till 14 November 1959. During which time he served as acting army commander on four occasions.

On 14 November 1959, he was promoted to the rank of brigadier and then major general on 1 January 1960 taking over as commander of the Ceylon Army. During his service, he introduced Sinhalese for parade ground commands and formed the Army Hewisi Band of oriental music. He retired from the army in 1963 following the 1962 attempt coup d'état of which he was not a part.

== Diplomatic career ==
After his retirement, he was appointed High Commissioner of Ceylon to Pakistan, with concurrent accreditation to Iran. Thereafter he was made Ceylon's ambassador to Italy with concurrent accreditation to Greece.

== Death ==
During his tenure in Italy, he met with a fatal motor accident. His military funeral was held in Colombo.

== Family ==
He was married to Olive Wickramasinghe, they had two sons and a daughter.

== Honours ==
For his military service he was made an Officer of the Order of the British Empire (OBE) (Military Division) in the 1950 King's new years honours list and received the Efficiency Decoration and the King George V Silver Jubilee Medal in 1935 for volunteer service. For wartime service, he had earned the Defence Medal and the War Medal 1939–1945, and for service in the Ceylon Army, he received the Ceylon Armed Services Inauguration Medal.

== See also ==
- Sri Lankan Non Career Diplomats

Military offices
| Preceded by Anton Muttukumaru | Commander of the Ceylon Army; 1960–1963 | Succeeded by Richard Udugama |
