= Malcolm Sinclair, 20th Earl of Caithness =

Scottish clan chief (born 1948)

The Right Honourable The Earl of Caithness PC
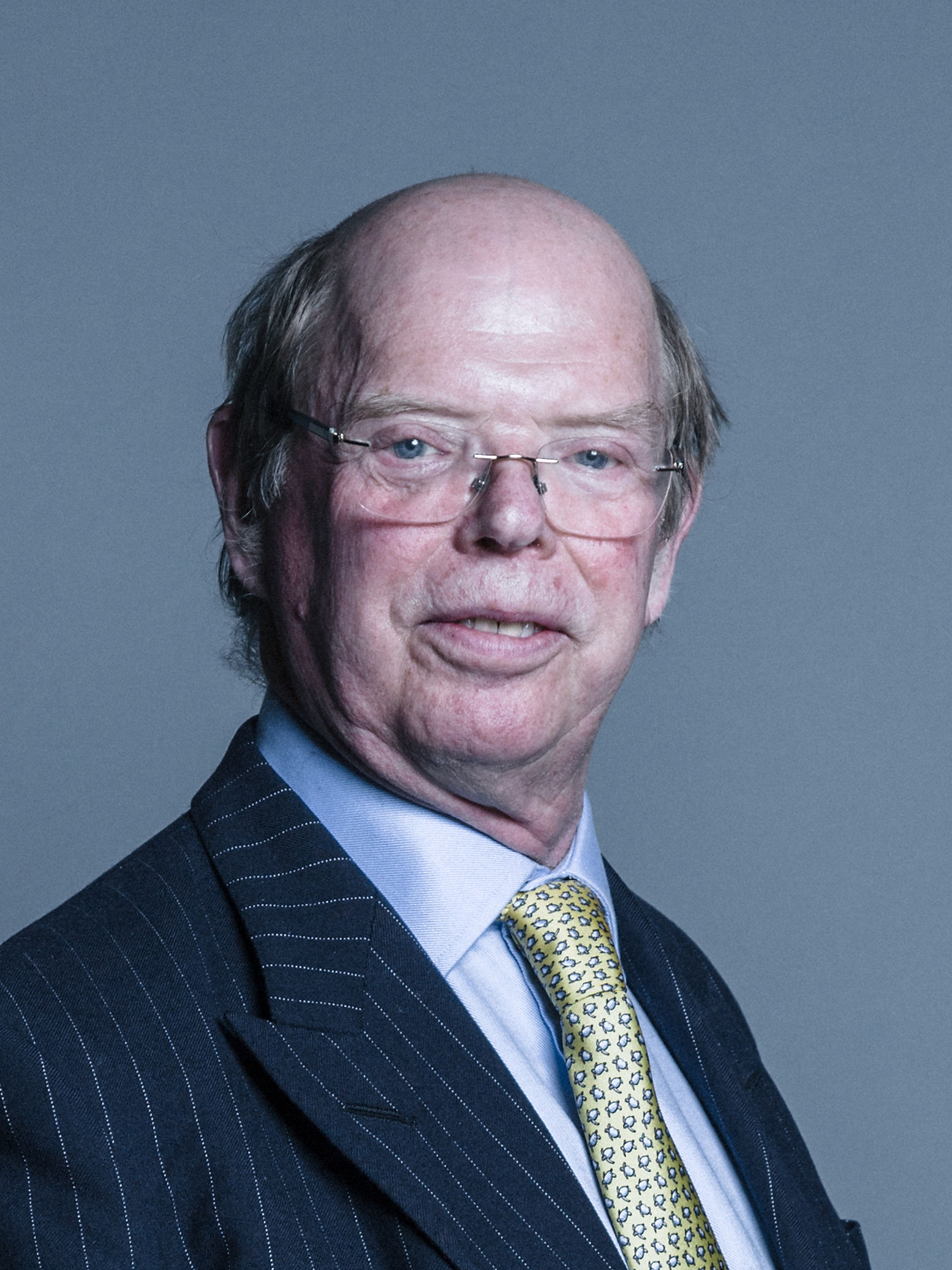

Minister of State for Aviation and Shipping
- In office 14 April 1992 – 11 January 1994
- Prime Minister: John Major
- Preceded by: The Lord Brabazon of Tara
- Succeeded by: John Watts

Minister of State for Foreign and Commonwealth Affairs
- In office 14 July 1990 – 14 April 1992
- Prime Minister: Margaret Thatcher; John Major
- Preceded by: The Lord Brabazon of Tara
- Succeeded by: Alastair Goodlad

Paymaster General
- In office 25 July 1989 – 14 July 1990
- Prime Minister: Margaret Thatcher
- Preceded by: Peter Brooke
- Succeeded by: Richard Ryder

Minister of State for Housing
- In office 25 July 1988 – 25 July 1989
- Prime Minister: Margaret Thatcher
- Preceded by: William Waldegrave
- Succeeded by: Michael Howard

Minister of State for Environment
- In office 10 January 1988 – 25 July 1988
- Prime Minister: Margaret Thatcher
- Preceded by: The Lord Belstead
- Succeeded by: Michael Howard

Minister of State for Home Affairs
- In office 10 September 1986 – 10 January 1988
- Prime Minister: Margaret Thatcher
- Preceded by: Giles Shaw
- Succeeded by: The Earl Ferrers

Parliamentary Under-Secretary of State for Transport
- In office 2 September 1985 – 10 September 1986
- Prime Minister: Margaret Thatcher
- Preceded by: David Mitchell
- Succeeded by: The Lord Brabazon of Tara

Lord-in-waiting Government Whip
- In office 8 May 1984 – 2 September 1985
- Prime Minister: Margaret Thatcher
- Preceded by: The Lord Lyell
- Succeeded by: The Viscount Davidson

Member of the House of Lords
- Lord Temporal
- Hereditary peerage 2 December 1969 – 11 November 1999
- Preceded by: The 19th Earl of Caithness
- Succeeded by: Seat abolished
- Elected Hereditary Peer; 11 November 1999 – 29 April 2026
- Election: 1999
- Preceded by: Seat established
- Succeeded by: Seat abolished

Personal details
- Born: 3 November 1948 (age 77)
- Party: Conservative
- Education: Marlborough College; Royal Agricultural College, Cirencester

Malcolm Ian Sinclair, 20th Earl of Caithness, PC (born 3 November 1948), is a Scottish Conservative politician, hereditary peer and former member of the House of Lords. He is also 20th Lord Berriedale, 15th Baronet, of Canisbay, Co. Caithness, and chief of Clan Sinclair. He is the Chief Executive of the Clan Sinclair Trust.

== Early life and education ==
Sinclair was born in 1948, the only son of Roderick Sinclair, 19th Earl of Caithness and his second wife Madeline Gabrielle Ormerod (née de Pury). Sinclair's mother was possibly descended from the de Pury family of Neuchâtel, Switzerland, who were members of the Prussian nobility.

He was educated at Blairmore School, Aberdeenshire, at Marlborough College and at the Royal Agricultural College (now Royal Agricultural University), Cirencester.

Sinclair succeeded to the earldom of Caithness and its subsidiary titles upon the death of his father in 1965.

== House of Lords and political offices ==
Lord Caithness served as a House of Lords government-whip under Margaret Thatcher from 1984 to 1985. He then moved to the Department of Transport as a Parliamentary Under Secretary of State, serving until 1986, the year when he became Minister of State at the Home Office. In 1988, he was once appointed Minister of State at the Department of Environment. In 1989, he became Paymaster General and a Minister of State in the Treasury.

In 1990, Caithness was appointed Minister of State at the Foreign Office, and then, in 1992, back to the Department of Transport. He was made a privy counsellor in 1990.

With the passage of the House of Lords Act 1999, Caithness, along with most other hereditary peers, lost his automatic right to sit in the House of Lords. He was, however, elected as one of the 90 representative peers designed under the provisions of the act to remain in the House of Lords. According to the Electoral Reform Society, he has since blocked further reform of the Lords, tabling 'wrecking' amendments to a draft Bill to abolish by-elections for hereditary peers, proposed by Lord Grocott in 2018.

Caithness is an opponent of fractional-reserve banking.

Caithness was a trustee of Queen Elizabeth Castle of Mey Trust, from its inception in 1996 until 2016. In 1999, he helped found a heritage charity, the Clan Sinclair Trust, the aim of which is the preservation and conservation of Castle Sinclair Girnigoe, near Wick in Caithness. He is chief executive and has been responsible for getting the castle listed by the World Monuments Fund in its Watch List of the 100 Most Endangered Sites in the World in 2002, the fundraising and overseeing the remedial works which has allowed the castle to be accessible and open to the public.

== Marriages and children ==
Caithness was married firstly on 9 January 1975 to Diana Caroline Coke. They had two children:

- Lady Iona Alexandra Sinclair (born 18 February 1978)
- Alexander James Richard Sinclair, Lord Berriedale (born 26 March 1981), heir apparent to the earldom.

In January 1994, Caithness resigned from his post at the Ministry of Transport, following the suicide of his wife. In November 2004 he married secondly Leila Cassel Jenkins, whom he had met at Ascot, in Rosslyn Chapel. He filed for divorce a year later. They had no children.

Political offices
Preceded by Peter Brooke	Paymaster General; 1989–1990	Succeeded by Richard Ryder
Peerage of Scotland
Preceded by James Sinclair	Earl of Caithness; 1965–present Member of the House of Lords (1969–1999)	Incumbent
Parliament of the United Kingdom
New office created by the House of Lords Act 1999	Elected hereditary peer to the House of Lords under the House of Lords Act 1999; 1999–2026	Office abolished under the House of Lords (Hereditary Peers) Act 2026
Preceded by The Earl of Liverpool	Longest-serving member in the House of Lords; 2026	Succeeded by The Baroness Cox
