= Daya Ratnayake =

Sri Lanka Army general

General Daya Ratnayake දයා රත්නායක WWV, RWP, RSP, USP
- Spouse: Priyadarshani Damayanthi
- Military career
- Allegiance: Sri Lanka
- Branch: Sri Lanka Army
- Service years: 1981 - 2015
- Rank: General
- Nickname: Daya
- Service number: O/50913
- Unit: Sri Lanka Light Infantry
- Commands: Commander of the Army, Chief of Staff, Sri Lanka Army
- Conflicts: Sri Lankan Civil War
- Awards: Weera Wickrama Vibhushanaya, Rana Wickrama Padakkama, Rana Sura Padakkama, Uttama Seva Padakkama, Desha Puthra Padakkama
- Other work: Secretary to the Ministry of Industries; Chairman, Sri Lanka Ports Authority

General R. M. Daya Ratnayake, WWV, RWP and three Bars, RSP, USP is a retired Sri Lanka Army officer who served as the Commander of the Sri Lanka Army from 2013 to 2015. Following his retirement from the army, he served as the Chairman, Sri Lanka Ports Authority and Secretary to the Ministry of Industries.

== Education ==
He was educated at Maliyadeva College, Kurunegala.

== Military career ==
He started his military career as an officer cadet in 1980 and received his basic training at the Sri Lanka Military Academy. He was commissioned as a second lieutenant in 1981 in the Sri Lanka Light Infantry. He thereafter completed the Commando Officers Course, Infantry Young Officers Course and the Battalion Support Weapon Course. He had completed the Junior Command and Senior Command Courses at the Army War College, Mhow. From January 1993 to January 1996, Ratnayake served as commanding officer of the 6th Battalion, Sri Lanka Light Infantry. He attended the graduated from Defence Service Command and Staff College, Bangladesh; the National Defence University, China and the Army Intelligence School, Fort Huachuca, United States. He has followed the Governance and Management of Defence Course at Cranfield University, UK, Higher Level Security Studies Diploma Course and Advanced Communication Skills Course in Asia-Pacific Centre for Security Studies in Honolulu, Hawaii, United States. He commanded the 6th Battalion Sri Light Infantry Regiment. He served as the General Officer Commanding of 23 Infantry Division in the Eastern province. He played important roles in the operations of Liberations of Vakare and Thoppigala. He also held the post of the Commissioner General Rehabilitation for rehabilitation of 12,000 ex-LTTE combatants under the Bureau of the Commissioner General Rehabilitation. His other notable appointments include Commanding Officer of Sri Lanka Military Academy and Director Media and Military Spokesman for the Ministry of Defence. On 1 August 2013, he became the 20th commander of the Sri Lanka Army and promoted to the rank of Lieutenant General simultaneously.

He was succeeded by Lieutenant General Crishantha de Silva in February 2015. The outgoing commander was promoted to the rank of full general by President Maithripala Sirisena.

== Later work ==
He was appointed Chairman, Sri Lanka Ports Authority in 2019 by President Gotabaya Rajapaksa and in 2021 he was appointed Secretary to the Ministry of Industries. In January 2024, he joined the Samagi Jana Balawegaya (SJB) party and was appointed the party’s senior advisor on state affairs.

== Family ==
He is married to Priyadarshani Damayanthi and has two sons and a daughter.

== Awards and decorations ==
He got many awards including Weera Wickrema Vibushanaya (WWV), Rana Wickrama Padakkama (RWP) (Awarded four times for Exceptional Gallantry), Rana Sura Padakkama (RSP) (Awarded four times for Gallantry), Uttama Seva Padakkama (USP) (For distinguished conduct) and Desha Puthra Padakkama (DPP) (For wounded in combat). He has been recognized as the most decorated officer to have been made the commander.

== See also ==
- List of Sri Lankan non-career Permanent Secretaries

Military offices
Preceded by Jagath Jayasuriya	Commander of the Army; 1 August 2013 – 21 February 2015	Succeeded by Crishantha de Silva
