= Jagath Jayasuriya =

Sri Lankan army officer

General Jagath Jayasuriya VSV, USP
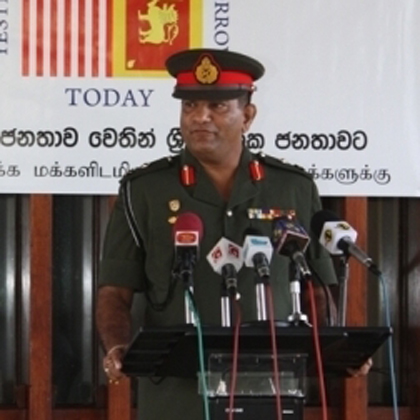
- Jayasuriya in 2010
- Spouse: Manjulika Aruna
- Military career
- Allegiance: Sri Lanka
- Branch: Sri Lanka Army
- Service years: 1980 – 2015
- Rank: General
- Unit: Sri Lanka Armoured Corps
- Commands: Chief of Defence Staff; Commander of the Army; Security Forces Headquarters - Wanni; 52 Division; 563 Infantry Brigade
- Conflicts: Sri Lankan Civil War; Insurrection 1987-89
- Awards: Vishista Seva Vibhushanaya; Uttama Seva Padakkama
- Other work: Ambassador to Brazil

General Jagath Jayasuriya, VSV, USP is a retired senior Sri Lanka Army officer; he was the Commander of the Sri Lanka Army from 15 July 2009 to 31 July 2013. During the closing stages of the Sri Lankan Civil War, he served as the Commander Security Forces Headquarters - Wanni with overall command of SLA offensives in the Wanni region during the 2008 - 2009 period.

He was also the Sri Lankan Ambassador to Brazil, Argentina, Chile, Colombia, Peru and Suriname from June 2014 to August 2017.

== Education and family ==
Educated at the Royal College, Colombo, Jayasuriya captained the college boxing team in 1977, winning colours for boxing and was a senior prefect. He is a graduate of the Defence Services Staff College (India) and the National Defence University (China). In 1990 he gained a Master of Science Degree in Defence Studies from the University of Madras and had also attended the School of Armour, Pakistan in 1980 and the Armoured Corps Centre and School, India in 1982.

Jayasuriya is the youngest of six brothers, three of whom also attended Royal College and, alongside Jagath, were prize-winning boxers.

== Military career ==
Joining the army after completing schooling in 1978 as a cadet officer, he was at the top of his class at the Army Training Centre and was commissioned into the Sri Lanka Armoured Corps as a second lieutenant on 23 January 1980 with his military career spanning the Sri Lankan Civil War. He was promoted to the ranks of lieutenant in 1981, captain in 1984, major in 1988 and lieutenant colonel in 1993. During this time he had served as a troop leader (1980–1983) and adjutant (1984–1985) of the 1st Reconnaissance Regiment. After a brief posting as a staff officer at Army Headquarters, he was later appointed squadron commander, 1st Reconnaissance Regiment. From 1990 to 1992 he had served as a brigade major, 9 Brigade in Jaffna and served as Chief Instructor at Officers Study Centre and Staff Officer II (Training), Army Training Centre. In 1992 he was the Second in Command of the 3rd Reconnaissance Regiment and had served as a Staff Officer of the Armoured Brigade in 1994 he became the commanding officer, 1st Reconnaissance Regiment, Sri Lanka Armoured Corps till June 1995. During July 1995 - May 1996, he was the general staff officer at the Joint Operations Headquarters (JOH) and later served as military secretary Army Headquarters.

In 1997, he was the brigade commander of the armoured brigade and in 1998 posted to the 563 Infantry Brigade as its brigade commander. He was critically wounded during the Operation Jayasikurui in 1998, when his jeep hit a land mine in the Kolamadu area. After recuperating he was the military liaison officer at Ministry of Defence till 2002 and was promoted to brigadier in 2001. That year he was appointed the commandant of the Sri Lanka Military Academy. In December 2004, he was appointed director of operations at Army Headquarters and thereafter promoted to the rank of major general he took over as general officer commanding of the 52 Division.

In mid-2007 he was appointed commander Security Forces Headquarters - Wanni (SFHQ-W). From this capacity he directed the military operations in the Wanni region that was aimed at regaining area controlled by the LTTE. This saw several major battles which included the Battle of Vidattaltivu, the Battle of Paranthan, the Battle of Kilinochchi, the Third Battle of Elephant Pass and the Battle of Mullaitivu. At the height of the war he had 5 divisions and 3 task forces under his command, thus making it the largest military command in Sri Lankan military history. He is the colonel commandant of the Sri Lanka Armoured Corps and the Mechanized Infantry Regiment.

On 15 July 2009, he left SFHQ-W to take over as Commander of the Sri Lanka Army. On 14 June 2013, he was promoted to the rank of full general and was appointed Chief of Defence Staff with effect from 1 August 2013, when his tenure as Army Commander ended. He held the post till June 2015 when he retired from the army.

== Post-military career ==
Following his retirement from the army, General Jayasuriya was appointed Sri Lankan Ambassador to Brazil, in which capacity he is concurrently accredited as Ambassador to Argentina, Chile, Colombia, Peru and Suriname. His tenure ended at the end of August 2017.

=== Allegations of war crimes ===
Having been a central figure in the deciding stages of Eelam War IV, Jayasuriya has, like Sarath Fonseka and Gotabhaya Rajapakse, been accused of being complicit in the alleged war crimes carried out by the SLA during this period. On 28 August 2017, the International Truth and Justice Project (ITJP)- a group affiliated with the Foundation for Human Rights based in South Africa- filed lawsuits against Jayasuriya in Brazil and Colombia, citing his alleged complicity and command role in artillery strikes on hospitals and other civilian targets, torture (including sexual violence) and enforced disappearances. The same lawsuits were planned to be filed in Argentina, Chile and Peru, while Suriname had refused to accept them. In September 2017 current Sri Lankan president Maithripala Sirisena refused to let several human rights groups take Jagath Jayasuriya to court for war crimes. Sirisena reportedly said "I stated very clearly that I will not allow anyone in the world to touch Jagath Jayasuriya or any other military chief or any war hero in this country," in reference to the lawsuit.

=== Sanctions ===
In March 2025, the Government of the United Kingdom imposed travel sanctions, former Commander of the Army Shavendra Silva and Jagath Jayasuriya, former Commander of the Navy Wasantha Karannagoda and ex-LTTE Vinayagamoorthy Muralitharan, aka Karuna Amman as part of what the Foreign office called "UK travel bans and asset freezes, target individuals responsible for a range of violations and abuses, such as extrajudicial killings, during the civil war". The Ministry of Foreign Affairs said that this was a unilateral action taken by the UK government and such action does not assist but serve to complicate the national reconciliation process underway in Sri Lanka and went on to say human rights violations in the past need to handle by domestic accountability mechanisms. The Wartime President Mahinda Rajapaksa rejected UK governments allegations of human rights violations, stating "We waged war only against the LTTE and not against the Tamil people".

== Personal life ==
He is married to Manjulika Aruna and has one son and one daughter.

== Decorations ==
His awards and decorations include the distinguished service medals Vishista Seva Vibhushanaya (VSV) and Uttama Seva Padakkama (USP); the wound medal Desha Putra Sammanaya; the long service medals Sri Lanka Armed Services Long Service Medal and clasp; campaign medals Northern Humanitarian Operations Medal, Purna Bhumi Padakkama, North and East Operations Medal and Riviresa Campaign Services Medal; and President's Inauguration Medal, 50th Independence Anniversary Commemoration Medal and Sri Lanka Army 50th Anniversary Medal.

Diplomatic posts
Preceded by Raja Edirisuriya	Sri Lankan Ambassador to Brazil; 2015 –	Succeeded by -
Military offices
Preceded by Roshan Goonetileke	Chief of the Defence Staff; 1 August 2013 – 15 June 2015	Succeeded by Kolitha Gunathilake
Preceded by Sarath Fonseka	Commander of the Army; 15 July 2009 – 31 July 2013	Succeeded by Daya Ratnayake
Preceded by Upali Edirisinghe	Commander Security Forces Headquarters - Wanni; 2007 - 2009	Succeeded by -
