= List of high commissioners of Sri Lanka to Pakistan =

The Sri Lankan High Commissioner to Pakistan is the Sri Lankan envoy to Pakistan. Countries belonging to the Commonwealth of Nations typically exchange High Commissioners, rather than Ambassadors. Though there are a few technical differences (for instance, whereas Ambassadors present their diplomatic credentials to the host country's head of state, High Commissioners are accredited to the head of government), they are in practice one and the same office. The Sri Lankan High Commissioner to Pakistan is concurrently accredited as Ambassador to Kyrgyzstan and Tajikistan.

== High Commissioners ==
- Tuan Burhanudeen Jayah (1950–1957)
- Major General Anton Muttukumaru (1959-1963)
- Major General H. W. G. Wijeyekoon (1963-1965)
- Hugh Fernando (1965-1968)
- Sir Razik Fareed (1968-1970)
- M. M. Mahroof (1970–1973)
- Theja Gunawardene (1974–1977)
- Dr Dharmasena Attygalle (1983-1985)
- Oscar de Livera (1985-1988)
- Austin Jayawardhana
- General G.H De Silva (1996-1998)
- Alfred K. David (1998-2000)
- General Srilal Weerasooriya (2000-2006)
- W. B. Dorakumbure (2006-2008)
- Air Chief Marshal Jayalath Weerakkody (2009-2016)
- Major General Jayanath Lokuketagodage (2016-2019)
- Vice Admiral Mohan Wijewickrama (2020-2023)
- Admiral Ravindra Wijegunaratne (2023-Present)

== See also ==
- List of heads of missions from Sri Lanka
