= Commander of the Army (Sri Lanka) =

Head of the Sri Lanka Army

Commander of the Sri Lanka Army
- ශ්‍රී ලංකාවේ යුද්ධ හමුදාපති
- Flag of the Sri Lankan Army
- Incumbent; Lieutenant General Nilantha Premaratne since 1 August 2026
- Sri Lanka Army
- Member of: National Security Council
- Residence: General's House, Colombo
- Seat: Army Headquarters
- Appointer: President of Sri Lanka
- Term length: Not fixed
- Precursor: Commander of the Ceylon Defence Force
- Formation: 20 October 1949; 77 years ago as Commander of the Ceylon Army
- First holder: Brigadier Roderick Sinclair (as Commander, Ceylon Army)
- Deputy: Chief of Staff of the Army
- Website: Official website

The commander of the Army (Sinhala: ශ්‍රී ලංකාවේ යුද්ධ හමුදාපති, romanized: śrī laṁkāvē yuddha hamudāpati) is the title of the professional head of the Sri Lanka Army. The current commander of the Army is Lieutenant General Nilantha Premaratne.

The post's precursor was known as Commander of the Ceylon Defence Force.

Serving army commanders have by convention been of the rank of Lieutenant General, promoted to the rank of General on the day of their retirement or after getting the appointment of Chief of Defence Staff which post is now obsolete. Sepala Attygalle was the first army commander who was promoted to full general on the day of his retirement in 1977. Tissa Weeratunga was the second commander to be promoted to the rank of full general on the day of his retirement in 1985 (after serving as the general officer commanding of the joint operations command).

Sarath Fonseka, Jagath Jayasuriya and Shavendra Silva were elevated to the rank of general while serving as commander. Denis Perera and Nalin Seneviratne were promoted to full general in 2007 after 26 years and 19 years of retirement respectively.

The official residence of the commander is General's House, Colombo.

== List of commanders ==
From Hamilton Wanasinghe (appointed in 1988) customarily all army commanders are lieutenant generals and were later promoted to full general on the day of their retirement or after becoming the g.o.c. of the joint operations command which was later known as chief of defence staff.

No.	Picture	Commander	Took office	Left office	Time in office	Unit of commission
1	The Earl of Caithness CBE, DSO	Brigadier; The Earl of Caithness CBE, DSO (1906–1965)	20 October 1949	17 May 1952	2 years, 210 days	Gordon Highlanders
2	Sir Francis Reid CBE	Brigadier; Sir Francis Reid CBE (1900–1970)	18 May 1952	8 February 1955	2 years, 266 days	Royal Artillery
3	Anton Muttukumaru OBE, ED	Major General; Anton Muttukumaru OBE, ED (1908–2001)	9 February 1955	31 December 1959	4 years, 326 days	Ceylon Light Infantry
4	H. W. G. Wijeyekoon OBE, ED	Major General; H. W. G. Wijeyekoon OBE, ED (1911–1969)	1 January 1960	31 December 1963	3 years, 364 days	Ceylon Light Infantry
5	Deshamanya Richard Udugama MBE	Major General; Deshamanya Richard Udugama MBE (1911–1995)	1 January 1964	10 November 1966	2 years, 313 days	Ceylon Light Infantry
6	Deshabandu Bertram Heyn	Major General; Deshabandu Bertram Heyn (1912–1998)	11 November 1966	30 September 1967	323 days	Ceylon Light Infantry
7	Deshamanya Sepala Attygalle LVO	General; Deshamanya Sepala Attygalle LVO (1922–2001)	1 October 1967	13 October 1977	10 years, 12 days	Sri Lanka Armoured Corps
8	Deshamanya Denis Perera VSV	General; Deshamanya Denis Perera VSV (1930–2013)	14 October 1977	13 October 1981	3 years, 364 days	Sri Lanka Engineers
9	Tissa Weeratunga VSV	General; Tissa Weeratunga VSV (1930–2003)	14 October 1981	11 February 1985	3 years, 120 days	Gemunu Watch
10	Nalin Seneviratne VSV	General; Nalin Seneviratne VSV (1931–2009)	12 February 1985	15 August 1988	3 years, 185 days	Sri Lanka Engineers
11	Hamilton Wanasinghe VSV	General; Hamilton Wanasinghe VSV (1935–2025)	16 August 1988	15 November 1991	3 years, 91 days	Sri Lanka Artillery
12	Cecil Waidyaratne VSV	General; Cecil Waidyaratne VSV (1938–2001)	16 November 1991	31 December 1993	2 years, 45 days	Sri Lanka Armoured Corps
13	G. H. De Silva RWP, VSV, USP	General; G. H. De Silva RWP, VSV, USP (born 1940)	1 January 1994	30 April 1996	2 years, 120 days	Gemunu Watch
14	Rohan Daluwatte WWV, RWP, RSP, VSV, USP	General; Rohan Daluwatte WWV, RWP, RSP, VSV, USP (1941–2018)	1 May 1996	15 December 1998	2 years, 228 days	Sri Lanka Armoured Corps
15	Srilal Weerasooriya RWP, RSP, VSV, USP	General; Srilal Weerasooriya RWP, RSP, VSV, USP (born 1943)	16 December 1998	24 August 2000	1 year, 252 days	Sri Lanka Artillery
16	Lionel Balagalle RWP, RSP, VSV, USP, VSP	General; Lionel Balagalle RWP, RSP, VSV, USP, VSP (1947–2023)	25 August 2000	30 June 2004	3 years, 310 days	Sri Lanka Artillery
17	Shantha Kottegoda WWV, RWP, RSP, VSV, USP, VSP	General; Shantha Kottegoda WWV, RWP, RSP, VSV, USP, VSP (born 1949)	1 July 2004	5 December 2005	1 year, 157 days	Sri Lanka Light Infantry
18	Sarath Fonseka RWP, RSP, VSV, USP	Field Marshal; Sarath Fonseka RWP, RSP, VSV, USP (born 1950)	6 December 2005	15 July 2009	3 years, 221 days	Sri Lanka Sinha Regiment
19	Jagath Jayasuriya VSV, USP	General; Jagath Jayasuriya VSV, USP (born 1959)	15 July 2009	1 August 2013	4 years, 17 days	Sri Lanka Armoured Corps
20	Daya Ratnayake WWV, RWP, RSP, USP	General; Daya Ratnayake WWV, RWP, RSP, USP (born 1958)	1 August 2013	21 February 2015	1 year, 204 days	Sri Lanka Light Infantry
21	Crishantha de Silva RWP, USP	General; Crishantha de Silva RWP, USP	22 February 2015	4 July 2017	2 years, 132 days	Sri Lanka Engineers
22	Mahesh Senanayake RWP, RSP, VSV, USP	General; Mahesh Senanayake RWP, RSP, VSV, USP	4 July 2017	19 August 2019	2 years, 46 days	Sri Lanka Engineers
23	Shavendra Silva WWV, RWP, RSP, VSV, USP	General; Shavendra Silva WWV, RWP, RSP, VSV, USP (born 1964)	19 August 2019	31 May 2022	2 years, 285 days	Gajaba Regiment
24	Vikum Liyanage RWP, RSP, USP	General; Vikum Liyanage RWP, RSP, USP (born 1967)	1 July 2022	31 December 2024	2 years, 215 days	Gajaba Regiment
25	Lasantha Rodrigo RSP	General; Lasantha Rodrigo RSP	31 December 2024	31 July 2026	1 year, 212 days	Sri Lanka Artillery
26	Nilantha Premaratne RSP, VSV, USP	Lieutenant General; Nilantha Premaratne RSP, VSV, USP	1 August 2026	Incumbent	104 days	Sri Lanka Artillery
