= Rohan Daluwatte =

Sri Lankan army officer

General Rohan Daluwatte රොහාන් දඵවත්ත WWV, RWP, RSP, VSV, USP
- Born: 9 May 1941; Ambalangoda, British Ceylon
- Died: 27 August 2018 (aged 77); Colombo, Sri Lanka
- Military career
- Allegiance: Sri Lanka
- Branch: Sri Lanka Army
- Service years: 1963–1998 (35 years)
- Rank: General
- Unit: Sri Lanka Armoured Corps
- Commands: Commander of the Army; Overall Operational Commander
- Conflicts: Sri Lankan Civil War
- Awards: Weera Wickrama Vibhushanaya; Rana Wickrama Padakkama; Rana Sura Padakkama; Vishista Seva Vibhushanaya; Uttama Seva Padakkama

General Rohan De Silva Daluwatte, WWV, RWP, RSP, VSV, USP (9 May 1941 – 27 August 2018) was a senior officer of the Sri Lanka Army. He served as Commander of the Sri Lanka Army and Chief of the Defence Staff. Following his retirement from the army, he served as Sri Lankan Ambassador to Brazil among other appointments.

The major achievement during his tenure as Army Chief of Staff was the capture of the Jaffna peninsula during Operation Riviresa, under his command as Joint Operations Commander. As Commander of the Army, he oversaw large scale operations against Liberation Tigers of Tamil Eelam (LTTE), Operation Jayasikurui, Operation Sath Jaya and Operation Thrivida Pahara with mixed success.

== Early life and education ==
Daluwatte was born in Ambalangoda, a coastal town in the south of Sri Lanka, to D. H. Paulis De Silva, a planter and former athlete; and D. W. Leela Somawathie. He had one sister, Malini and four brothers, Susantha, Pinsiri, Rupasiri and Dhanasiri.

He received his education in Dharmapala Vidyalaya and at Ananda College. During his school career he captained the Ananda College badminton team from 1957 to 1960, was a member of the college tennis team in 1959 and 1960 and he was the wicket-keeper in the Ananda first XI in 1960. He was a college prefect and a Lance Corporal of the cadet platoon.

== Military career ==
=== Early military career ===
Daluwatte joined the Ceylon Army on 14 August 1961 as an officer cadet and received his officer training at the Royal Military Academy, Sandhurst. At Sandhurst, he excelled in athletics, badminton and basketball. He won the triple jump event at the British Army Championships and won the British Combined Services Colours for Athletics.

On his return to Ceylon, he was commissioned as a Second Lieutenant in the 1st Reconnaissance Regiment, Ceylon Armoured Corps on 1 August 1963. He then attended the young officers course at the Royal Armoured Corps Centre, Bowington. He later went on to captain the Sri Lankan Army basketball team.

He went on to serve as the Chief Instructor of the Officer Cadet School at the Army Training Centre from 1979 to 1981. As a Major, he served as the commanding officer of the 1st Reconnaissance Regiment, Sri Lanka Armoured Corps from December 1981 to July 1982; there after served as the commanding officer of the Sri Lanka Army Service Corps; Coordinating Officer Commanding Troops in Mannar; Director-Supplies and Transport; Commandant of the Army Training Centre and Military Secretary at Army Headquarters. He had graduated from the Defence Services Staff College and the National Defence College.

== Operation Riviresa ==
In 1995 Major General Daluwatte, who was the Chief of Staff of the Army was appointed Overall Operational Commander - North and East by President Chandrika Kumaratunga to command Operation Riviresa the largest combined military operation undertaken by the Sri Lankan armed forces at the time. With the objective of regaining control of the Jaffna peninsula from the LTTE, Operation Riviresa was successful in recapturing Jaffna and pushing the LTTE to the jungles of Wanni with significant loss of men and material.

== Commander of the Army ==
On 1 May 1996, he was appointed the 14th Commander of the Army of Sri Lanka by President Chandrika Kumaratunga and promoted to the rank of Lieutenant General. The early part of his tenure saw the loss of Mullaitivu and Operation Sath Jaya which captured Kilinochchi. After the loss of Vavunathivu, Operation Jayasikurui was launched as the largest military operation undertaken by the Sri Lankan armed forces at the time to open a land route to the Jaffna peninsula through the LTTE held areas. It was called off by President Kumaratunga after having captured Mannakulam, Omanthai and Nedunkerny, but losing Kilinochchi and failing in achieving its objective. In April 1997, he co-hosted with Commander Pacific Army the Pacific Armies Management Seminar. On 15 December 1998, he retired from the military service, having been promoted to the rank of General.

== Chief of Defence Staff ==
After his retirement, he was appointed Chairman of the newly created Joint Operations Bureau, however he was reinstated to active service with the formation of the post of Chief of Defence Staff. During his tenure, he was given authority over all Sri Lankan armed forces to coordinate efforts to stall the LTTE offensive on the Jaffna peninsula following the loss of Elephant Pass. This was achieved with the establishment of the Muhamalai and Nagarkovil defensive lines which remained in place till the last days of the conflict in 2000. He retired as CDS in 2002. Daluwatte offered his resignation in September 2000 following casualties suffered by Sri Lankan security forces in an offensive.

== Later life ==
After retiring from the army, he was appointed the Ambassador of Sri Lanka to Brazil in 2002. With no permanent diplomatic presence in Brazil, General Daluwatte established a Sri Lankan embassy in Brasília and served as Sri Lanka Ambassador till 2005. Later, he was appointed Chairman of the Gem and Jewellery Authority of Sri Lanka and then the Chairman of the Civil Aviation Authority of Sri Lanka. He also served as the Chancellor of the Kotalawala Defence University.

== Death ==
General Daluwatte died on the 27 August 2018 at the army hospital in Colombo, Sri Lanka. He was cremated at the Borella Cemetery in Colombo with full military honours on 29 August 2018.

== Family ==
He met his wife while he was captain of the national basketball team whilst she was playing for the Sri Lanka national women's team. They had a daughter Radiesha; and a son, Radesh.

== Honors ==
In the course of his military career he was awarded several of Sri Lanka's highest medals and decorations, including the Weera Wickrama Vibhushanaya, Rana Wickrama Padakkama, Rana Sura Padakkama, Vishista Seva Vibhushanaya and Uttama Seva Padakkama.

Weera Wickrama Vibhushanaya	Rana Wickrama Padakkama	Rana Sura Padakkama	Vishista Seva Vibhushanaya
Uththama Seva Padakkama	Purna Bhumi Padakkama	North and East Operations Medal	Vadamarachchi Operation Medal
Riviresa Campaign Services Medal	Republic of Sri Lanka Armed Services Medal	Sri Lanka Army 25th Anniversary Medal	50th Independence Anniversary Commemoration Medal
Sri Lanka Army 50th Anniversary Medal	Sri Lanka Armed Services Long Service Medal	President's Inauguration Medal	Legion of Merit
Order of the Southern Cross

He was also awarded the Legion of Merit by the United States for defense co-operation during the 1997 Pacific Armies Management Seminar and Grand Cross of the Order of the Southern Cross by Brazil for his services for co-operation between Brazil and Sri Lanka during his tenure as Sri Lankan Ambassador to Brazil.

=== Controversy ===
Sri Lankan newspaper The Sunday Leader alleged in January 2011 that Daluwatte wrote his own recommendation for the Weera Wickrama Vibhushanaya, which is Sri Lanka's second highest gallantry award for actions in combat. The newspaper also alleged that he did not obtain three eye witness reports which is a usual requirement for the medal. The citation stated that the medal was for gallantry in the operation to capture Jaffna. Daluwatte later stated that he had not been in combat at Jaffna but saw action at Neerveli, though none of the commanders spoken to by the newspaper could verify this.

== See also ==
- List of Commander of the Army (Sri Lanka)
- List of Sri Lankan generals
- Sri Lankan non-career diplomats

Military offices
Preceded by G. H. De Silva	Commander of the Sri Lankan Army; 1996–1998	Succeeded by C. S. Weerasooriya
