= List of ambassadors of Sri Lanka to Brazil =

The Sri Lankan Ambassador to Brazil is the Sri Lankan envoy to Brazil. The Sri Lankan Ambassador to Brazil is concurrently accredited as Ambassador to Argentina, Chile, Colombia, Peru and Suriname. The current ambassador is General Jagath Jayasuriya.

== Former ambassadors ==
- Mahinda Balasuriya
- Hamilton Shirley Amerasinghe
- Rohan Daluwatte
- Shantha Kottegoda

== See also ==
- List of heads of missions from Sri Lanka
