= Jayanath Sandacan =

Sri Lankan cricketer

Jayanath Sandacan was a Sri Lankan cricketer. He was a right-handed batsman and right-arm medium-pace bowler who played for Panadura Sports Club.

Sandacan made a single first-class appearance for the team, during the 1998–99 season, against Colombo. From the tailend, he scored 30 runs in the first innings in which he batted, and 4 runs in the second, though this was not enough to prevent Panadura losing by an innings margin.
