= Anton Muttukumaru =

Sri Lankan Army general (1908–2001)

- Major General Anton Muttukumaru
- Born: 6 July 1908; Ceylon
- Died: April 6, 2001 (aged 92); Australia
- Military career
- Allegiance: Ceylon
- Branch: Ceylon Army
- Service years: 1934–1959
- Rank: Major General
- Service number: O/50001
- Unit: Ceylon Light Infantry
- Commands: Commander of the Ceylon Army, Chief of Staff of the Ceylon Army
- Conflicts: World War II
- Awards: Order of the British Empire (Military Division), Efficiency Decoration, War Medal 1939–1945, Ceylon Armed Services Long Service Medal
- Other work: High Commissioner to Australia, Pakistan and Ambassador to Egypt

Major General Anton Muttukumaru, OBE, ED, ADC (6 July 1908 – 2001) was the first native Ceylonese to serve as the Commander of the Ceylon Army (now Sri Lanka Army), a post he held from 1955 to 1959. He also served as Ceylon's High Commissioner to Australia, New Zealand, Pakistan and Ambassador to Egypt.

== Early life and education ==
Born to Mary Mount Carmel Alles, a Colombo Chetty, and Dr. Philip Marian Muttukumaru, a Jaffna Tamil, he and his siblings were brought up by their mother after the early death of their father. Educated at home by an English governess and then at St. Joseph's College, Colombo, he then entered Ceylon University College and in 1928, he left for Jesus College, Oxford to read Philosophy, Politics and Economics. After completing his degree, he read for the Bar and was called by Gray's Inn to become a barrister. He returned to Ceylon, took his oaths as an Advocate of the Supreme Court of Ceylon and started his legal practice.

== Military career ==
=== Ceylon Defence Force ===
After returning from England, in 1934 he joined the Ceylon Defence Force, a part-time reserve force raised by the British to defend the island. Muttukumaru was commissioned as a second lieutenant in the Ceylon Light Infantry (CLI) on 11 September 1934. In 1939 he was mobilised with the rest of the CDF at the outset of World War II. During this time, he would go on to command the CLI Guard at the South East Asia Command headquarters in Kandy and was promoted captain on 29 November 1940 and major in 1942. On 1 November 1943 he was promoted lieutenant colonel and appointed commanding officer, 2nd Battalion CLI, in which appointment he continued to serve until the general demobilisation which took place after the end of the war in January 1947. He led Ceylon's contingent in the London victory parade in 1946.

Following the war, Muttukumaru worked once again as a lawyer representing the Attorney General, in a variety of cases but soon gave up law to function as Officer in Charge, Administration in the Ceylon Defence Force Headquarters, where he assisted in the initial plans for the formation of a new Ceylon Army, including the drafting of the Army Act.

=== Ceylon Army ===
When the Ceylon Army was formed in 1949, he was one of three lieutenant colonels commissioned into the regular force with the serial no O/50001. There he served as the Chief of Staff to Brigadier the Earl of Caithness. During this time he attended the Senior Officers' School, where he was taught by Field Marshal Montgomery and befriended future Israeli Defence Minister, Brigadier Moshe Dayan. He led the Ceylon contingent of soldiers to London on ceremonial duties for the funeral of George VI in 1952, and for the Queen's coronation. There his men mounted guard at Buckingham Palace. He was subsequently attached to the British Army in West Germany, serving at the Headquarters of the British Army of the Rhine.

On 1 January 1954, he was promoted to the rank of colonel and took over as commanding officer of the 1 Battalion, Ceylon Light Infantry and Officer Commanding Troops, Panagoda. Under his command the battalion undertook its first live fire exercise Ex TYRO. On 19 July 1954, he was appointed aide-de-camp to the Queen. On 8 February 1955, he relinquished command of the Ceylon Light Infantry.

=== Army Commander ===
On 9 February 1955, he was promoted to the rank of Brigadier and appointed first Ceylonese Army Commander. This took place while he was at attending the Imperial Defence College, Colonel Wijeyekoon who was the chief of staff, served as acting army commander until his return in 1956 when he assumed command of the army. On 1 January 1958, he was promoted to the rank of Major General, becoming the first army officer to hold the rank. During his time as commander, the army grew in size and was deployed on several occasions to curb civil unrest and riots. He elevated the Army Recruit Training Depot at Diyatalawa to the Army Training Centre, raised a new infantry battalion, Ceylon Sinha Regiment, promoted all commanding officer to the rank of lieutenant colonel after elevating all regular units to regimental strength; established the Headquarters of the Ceylon Volunteer Force and initiated the concept of regional commands. In 1959, he decided to retire so that younger officers could have their chance to command, even though Prime Minister Solomon Bandaranaike asked him to stay on.

== Later years ==
After leaving the army, Muttukumaru was appointed Ceylon's High Commissioner to Pakistan (with concurrent responsibility for Afghanistan, Iran and Iraq) in 1959, and High Commissioner to Australia and New Zealand from 1963 to 1966. Later in 1966, Muttukumaru became Ambassador to Egypt, concurrently he was Ambassador to Jordan, the Sudan and Yugoslavia. He permanently retired in 1969.

== Honors and decorations ==
During his service in the Ceylon Defence Force, he received the King George V Silver Jubilee Medal in 1935, appointed an officer of the Order of the British Empire (Military Division) in the 1946 Birthday Honours and awarded the Efficiency Decoration. For wartime service, he had earned the Defence Medal and the War Medal 1939–1945 in 1945; for service in the Ceylon Army, he received the Ceylon Armed Services Inauguration Medal in 1955.

In 1996, the General Sir John Kotelawela Defence Academy awarded an 'Honourable Doctor of Letters' to him for his contributions to the buildup of the Army and for being the first to publish a short history of the Army, "The Military History of Ceylon – An Outline" (ISBN 81-7013-046-8). General Muttukumaru died in Australia in 2001 at the age of 93.

== Family ==
Muttukumaru married Margaret Vasanthi Ratnarajah in 1944. They had three sons: Anton Vasantha Muttukumaru, Philip Rajkantha Muttukumaru and Christopher Peter Jayantha Muttukumaru, CB, DL.

== See also ==
- Sri Lankan Non Career Diplomats

Military offices
Preceded by F.S. Reid	Commander of the Ceylon Army; 1955–1959	Succeeded by H. W. G. Wijeyekoon
