= Jayanath Lokuketagodage =

Sri Lanka army general

Jayanath Lokuketagodage RSP, USP
- Military career
- Allegiance: Sri Lanka
- Branch: Army
- Rank: Major General
- Unit: Sri Lanka Sinha Regiment

Major General Jayanath Lokuketagodage, RSP, USP was a Sri Lanka Army general. He was the Sri Lankan High Commissioner to Pakistan from 2016 to 2019.

Having joined the Sri Lanka Army in 1980, Lokuketagodage received his basic officer training at the Sri Lanka Military Academy and was commissioned into the Sri Lanka Sinha Regiment. He went on to serve as the commanding officer, Sri Lanka United Nation Peace keeping troops in Haiti; Centre Commandant, Sri Lanka Sinha Regiment; Brigade Commander, 553 Brigade and Commander of Security Forces Headquarters before his retirement from the army in 2015.
