= National Security Council (Sri Lanka) =

Government agency

- ජාතික ආරක්ෂක කවුන්සිලය

Agency overview
- Formed: 1999
- Jurisdiction: Sri Lanka
- Agency executive: Anura Kumara Dissanayake as President of Sri Lanka, Chairperson

The National Security Council (NSC) of Sri Lanka is the executive body of the Sri Lankan government that is charged with the maintenance of national security with authority to direct the Sri Lankan military and Police.

== History ==
The National Security Council established in June 1999 by an Gazette notification, by President Chandrika Kumaratunga following the military set backs in Operation Jayasikurui taking over direct control of the military from her cousin General Anuruddha Ratwatte, the deputy defense minister. The NSC came to national attention following the 2019 Sri Lanka Easter bombings, in which Prime Minister Ranil Wickramasinghe claimed that although a member, he was not invited to NSC sessions chaired by President Maithripala Sirisena following the 2018 Sri Lankan constitutional crisis.

== Membership ==
Structure of the National Security Council
Chairperson	President	Anura Kumara Dissanayake
Statutory Members	Prime Minister	Harini Amarasuriya
Statutory Members	Minister of Defence	Anura Kumara Dissanayake
Statutory Members	Secretary to the Ministry of Defence	Air vice-marshal (Retd.) Sampath Thuyacontha
Statutory Members	Commander of the Army; Commander of the Navy; Commander of the Air Force; Inspector General of Police	Lieutenant General Lasantha Rodrigo; Vice Admiral Kanchana Banagoda; Air Marshal Vasu Bandu Edirisinghe; Priyantha Weerasooriya
Appointed Members	Personnel appointed by the President; Chief of National Intelligence; Director, SIS	

Anura Kumara Dissanayake appointed Cabinet Minister of Law and Order as an Advisor to the President on National Security, which was stylised by media and other government departments as National Security Advisor. However as the title is not a codified or established government position, the advisor is not an ex-officio member of the National Security Council.

== See also ==
- National security council
