= Security Forces Headquarters – Wanni =

Security Forces Headquarters – Wanni;
- Active: 6 November 1998 – Present
- Allegiance: Sri Lanka
- Branch: Sri Lanka Army
- Size: 5 divisions
- Garrison/HQ: Joseph Camp, Vavuniya
- Anniversaries: 6 November
- Engagements: Sri Lankan Civil War
- Website: army.lk/sfhqwanni

Commanders
- Current commander: Maj. Gen. Hemantha Bandara RWP RSP USP

Security Forces Headquarters – Wanni is a regional command of the Sri Lanka Army, that is responsible for the operational deployment and command all army units stationed in and around the southern part or the Vanni region of the Northern Province, this includes several divisions and the independent brigades. Currently due to ongoing combat operations it is the largest command in the country. It is one of the five Security Forces Headquarters and the General Officer Commanding it is one of the most senior officers in the army, the post is designated as Commander Security Forces Headquarters - Vanni. The current Commander SFHQ-W is Major General Hemantha Bandara. The SFHQ-W is based at the defense complex at Vavuniya.

Although it is primary a command of the Sri Lanka Army it coordinates operations and deployments of ground units of the Navy, Air Force and police with that of the army in that area. The Sri Lanka Navy units in the Northern Province come under the North Central Naval Area Command and Sri Lanka Air Force units come under its own Northern Zonal Command.

Area of responsibility includes Anuradhapura District, Vavuniya District, and Mannar District.

== Composition ==
- 21 Division, operating in the Anuradhapura District
- 54 Division, operating in the Mannar District
- 56 Division, operating in the Vavuniya District
- 59 Division, operating in the Mullaitivu District
- Area Headquarters Mannar

== Previous Commander Security Forces Headquarters - Wanni ==
- Brigadier (Later Major General)T Paranagama
- Major General (later General) Shantha Kottegoda,
- Major General (later General) Lionel Balagalle
- Major General Sisira Wijesooriya
- Major General (field Marshal) Sarath Fonseka
- Major General (later Lieutenant General) Parami Kulatunga
- Major General Upali Edirisinghe
- Major General Neil Dias
- Major General Wasantha Perera
- Major General (later Lieutenant General) Jagath Jayasuriya
- Major General Kumudu Perera RWP RSP VSV USP ndu
- Major General H J S Gunawardena RSP VSV USP ndc psc
- Major General A M R Dharmasiri ndu psc
- Major General J M U D Jayasinghe
- Major General W L P W Perera RWP RSP ndu
- Major General D M H D Bandara RWP RSP USP
- Major General C D Ranasingha RWP RSP
- Major General W P A D W Nanayakkara RSP VSV USP ndu
- Major General J P C Peiris RWP RSP ndc
