= Anoma Fonseka =

Sri Lankan politician

Anoma Fonseka අනෝමා ෆොන්සේකා

Chairperson of the Ranaviru Seva Authority
- In office 18 February 2015 – 2018

Personal details
- Born: 1957 (age 68–69) Dematagoda, Sri Lanka
- Spouse: Sarath Fonseka

Anoma Indumathi Fonseka (née Munasinghe) is the wife of former commander of the Sri Lanka Army and politician, Field Marshal Sarath Fonseka. She is also the former outgoing president of Seva Vanitha Army Branch, a position she held from 2005 to 2009. She was appointed the chairperson of the Ranaviru Seva Authority by the new UNP in 2015.

== Early life ==
Born in 1957, Fonseka was the youngest of the five siblings (two brothers and two sisters) in the business family of D.J. Munasinghe and Eugine. She studied at Gothami Balika Vidyalaya, Colombo, and is a trained pre-school teacher. She worked at the Visaka Nursery, Colombo, from 1990 to 2000. On April 29, 1979, she married Sarath Fonseka and had two daughters, Aparna and Apsara.

== Controversy ==
Fonseka was a controversial figure in Sri Lankan politics after her husband's entrance to politics and subsequent prison sentence. With the help of forces that opposed the government, she criticised the court ruling against her husband and continued the struggle to free her husband. Despite the requests to make a formal appeal to President Mahinda Rajapaksa in order to release her husband, Fonseka repeatedly rejected to apologize on behalf of him. On March 16, 2012, Fonseka met President Mahinda Rajapaksa at the residence of Democratic National Alliance MP Tiran Alles which was a decisive meeting for the release of Sarath Fonseka from prison. On February 2, 2011, she formed the "Anoma Fonseka Foundation". It was said that the foundation was not involved in any political work, but social causes to help the underprivileged.

== Honours ==
On August 25, 2007, Anoma Fonseka was honoured with the title of Shasanamamaka Deshabhimani Diriya Maatha by Sabaragamuwa Amarapura Siri Saddhammawansa Maha Nikaye Eknaligoda as a tribute for her service to the nation as the president of the Army Seva Vanitha Unit.
