= Roderick Sinclair, 19th Earl of Caithness =

Brigadier The Right Honourable The Earl of Caithness CVO CBE DSO
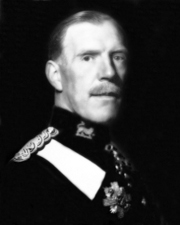
- Born: 29 September 1906
- Died: 8 May 1965 (aged 58)
- Relatives: Lord Berriedale (son)
- Military career
- Allegiance: United Kingdom; Ceylon
- Branch: British Army; Ceylon Army
- Service years: ?–1955
- Rank: Brigadier
- Service number: 36869
- Unit: Gordon Highlanders
- Commands: 153rd Infantry Brigade; Commander of Ceylon Army; 51st Infantry Brigade
- Conflicts: World War II

Brigadier James Roderick Sinclair, 19th Earl of Caithness, CVO, CBE, DSO (29 September 1906 – 8 May 1965) was a British Army officer during World War II, hereditary peer and chief of Clan Sinclair.

== Early life and education ==
Sinclair was born in 1906, the only son of the Rev and Hon Charles Augustus Sinclair, third son of James Augustus Sinclair, 16th Earl of Caithness, and his wife Mary Ann Harman. He was educated at Marlborough College.

Sinclair succeeded to the earldom and its subsidiary titles in 1947 upon the death of his uncle, Norman Macleod (Sinclair) Buchan, 18th Earl of Caithness, who had no son.

== Military service ==
Sinclair joined the Gordon Highlanders and rose to the rank of Brigadier and as such led his regiment (part of the 51st (Highland) Division) through France, Belgium, the Netherlands into Germany during World War II and was decorated with the Distinguished Service Order (DSO) and made Commander of the Order of the British Empire (CBE).

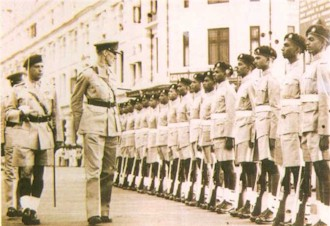
Guard of Honor for Brigadier James Sinclair, Earl of Caithness, held by Major B.R. Heyn.

In 1949 he was appointed the first Commander of the Ceylon Army and played a major role in establishing it as a regular army from the volunteer Ceylon Defence Force till 1952. On returning to the UK he was given various postings in England and Scotland before in 1955 being appointed land agent and manager of Her Majesty The Queen's private Estate at Balmoral Castle, Aberdeenshire where he lived until his death. After leaving the army, he was appointed Colonel of his old Regiment the Gordon Highlanders.

== Marriages and children ==
Sinclair married Grizel Margaret Miller-Cunningham on 29 April 1933. They had three daughters:

- Lady Jean Elizabeth Sinclair (born 11 February 1936)
- Lady Margaret Nicola Sinclair (born 11 September 1937)
- Lady Fiona Catharine Sinclair (born 27 October 1941)

His first wife died during World War II. In 1946, he married secondly a widow Madeline Gabrielle Ormerod (nee de Pury) (1912–1990), whose husband had been killed on active service in Africa leaving her with a daughter (Susie). They had two children:

- Lady Bridget Sarah Sinclair (18 May 1947 - 23 April 2011)
- Malcolm Ian Sinclair, 20th Earl of Caithness (born 3 November 1948)

== Death ==
Lord Caithness died on 8 May 1965 at the age of 58. He was succeeded in the earldom and its subsidiary titles and as chief of Clan Sinclair by his only son, Malcolm.

Military offices
New post	Commander of the Ceylon Army; 1949–1952	Succeeded by F.S. Reid
Peerage of Scotland
Preceded by Norman Sinclair	Earl of Caithness; 1947–1965	Succeeded by Malcolm Sinclair
