= General (Sri Lanka) =

Military rank in Sri Lanka

- Shoulder insignia for general
- Country: Sri Lanka
- Service branch: Sri Lanka Army
- Abbreviation: Gen
- Rank group: General officer
- Rank: Four-star rank
- Formation: 1949
- Next higher rank: Field marshal
- Next lower rank: Lieutenant general
- Equivalent ranks: Admiral (navy); Air chief marshal (air force)

General (abbreviated as Gen.) is the highest attainable and full general rank of the Sri Lankan Army and was created as a direct equivalent of the British military rank of general; it is also considered a four-star rank.

The rank of full general is not always given; this rank is held by a Chief of the Defence Staff (if the chief is appointed from the army and not from the navy or the air force) or is mostly awarded as a ceremonial rank to the Commander of the Army on his day of retirement.

General is a higher rank than lieutenant general, but is lower than field marshal. General is the equivalent of Admiral in the Sri Lanka Navy and Air Chief Marshal in the Sri Lanka Air Force.

== History ==
When the Ceylon Army was formed the rank of general was the highest rank defined under the Army Act of 1949. Since the formation the British Army officer heading the army held the rank of brigadier and the first Ceylonese officer to command the army, Anton Muttukumaru was promoted to the rank of major general in 1958.

In 1974, then commander of the army, Sepala Attygalle was promoted to the rank of lieutenant general and ever since then all serving commanders of the army held the rank of lieutenant general, customarily promoted to the rank on appointment to the post of commander of the army.

Sepala Attygalle became the first officer to be promoted to the rank of general on his retirement from the army on 13 October 1977. Former Prime Minister of Ceylon, Sir John Kotelawala was appointed to the honorary rank of general of the Volunteer Force in 1980. In 1986, Cyril Ranatunga became the first regular officer to be promoted to the rank of general, without serving as the commander of the army until Kamal Gunaratne was promoted in 2020. In 1991, Ranjan Wijeratne was the only person appointed to the rank posthumously. Since 1991, it became customary for all commanders of the army to be promoted to the rank of general on the final day of service if they were retiring or appointed as Chief of the Defence Staff. In 2007, two former commanders of the army were also promoted to the rank of general. In 2009, Sarath Fonseka became the first officer to hold the rank of general, while serving as commander of the army for a brief period. Jagath Jayasuriya was promoted to general while serving as the commander of the army in 2013. In 2015, the higher ceremonial rank of field marshal was created. General remains the highest rank under the Army Act and is the highest pay grade in the army. In 2020, Shavendra Silva was promoted to the rank while concurrently serving as both commander of the army and chief of the defence staff.

== Insignia ==
A general officer's insignia is a crossed sword and baton. A Major-General has a pip over this emblem; a Lieutenant-General a Sri Lanka emblem instead of a pip; and a full General both a pip and the Sri Lanka emblem. The Gorget patches of the General officer pattern, gold/silver oak leaf chain of two oak leave, four gold/silver stars on scarlet background with a gold/silver button; worn on Dress No 2A, 4, 5, 5A, 6, 6A, 6B, 7 and 8. The Gorget patches of the General Officers Large/Medium patterns, of gold braided (bullion wire) three oak leaves on scarlet background with a gold button, worn by the officers in the rank of major general and above for Dress No1, No 3 and 3A.

== Notable Generals ==
- General Rohan Daluwatte WWV, RWP, RSP, VSV, USP – 14th Commander of the Army, Overall Operational Commander, Chief of Defence Staff.
- General Kamal Gunaratne WWV, RWP, RSP, USP – Commands Security Forces Headquarters – Wanni, GOC 53 Division, Master General Ordinance (2015–2016), Secretary to the Ministry of Defence & State Ministry of National Security and Disaster Management, Deputy Ambassador to Brazil
- General Shavendra Silva WWV, RWP, RSP, VSV, USP – Chief of Defence Staff, 23rd Commander of the Army, Chief of Staff of the Army, GOC - 58 Division
- General Anuruddha Ratwatte – Cabinet Minister
- General John Kotelawala – 3rd Prime Minister of Ceylon
