= Vishista Seva Vibhushanaya =

- Type: Distinguished Service Medal
- Awarded for: Distinguished service over a continuous 25-year service period
- Description: Suspended from a plain suspension bar
- Presented by: Sri Lanka
- Eligibility: Senior officers of the regular forces of the tri-services
- Post-nominals: VSV
- Clasps: None
- Status: Currently awarded
- Established: 1981
- Ribbon bar

Precedence
- Next (higher): Rana Sura Padakkama
- Next (lower): Uttama Seva Padakkama

The Vishista Seva Vibhushanaya (VSV, Distinguished Service Order) (Sinhala: විශිෂ්ට සේවා විභූෂණය viṣiṣta sēvā vibhūṣaṇaya) is awarded to senior officers of the Military of Sri Lanka in recognition of:

...exceptional, distinguished and loyal service provided they count not less than twenty-five years of service and possess an unblemished record of moral and military conduct...

—

== Award process ==
Service commanders are responsible for evaluation of suitable candidates for conferment of the award, and make formal recommendations based on several requirements:

- a rank above Lieutenant Colonel (Army), Commander (Navy) or Wing Commander (Air Force)
- an uninterrupted service period of 25 years or more at the time of consideration
- a personal record clear of entries

Upon successful review, the decoration is usually awarded during the National Day parade (or at a special investiture ceremony) by the President. Recipients are entitled to the use of the post-nominal letters "VSV".

== History ==
With the establishment of the Ceylon Army in 1949 and the Royal Ceylon Navy in 1950, senior officers were recommended by the Governor General for Imperial honors, a practice that continued from the Ceylon Defence Force. These would normally be appointments in the Order of the British Empire in the classes of member or officer in the military division for military and naval officers. Queen Elizabeth II on visit to Ceylon in April 1954, she made personal appointments to the Royal Victorian Order for several military and naval officers. This practice was stopped in 1956 by Prime Minister S. W. R. D. Bandaranaike who suspended Imperial honors. Although long service medals and commemorative medals continued to be awarded, no gallantry or distinguished service medals were awarded until the new military honors were introduced by President J. R. Jayewardene on 1 September 1981, which introduced the Vishista Seva Vibhushanaya for senior military commanders for "exceptional, distinguished and loyal service" rendered over a period of over 25 years.
