= Comparative army officer ranks of the Commonwealth =

Rank comparison chart of armies/land forces of Commonwealth of Nations states.

== Officers ==
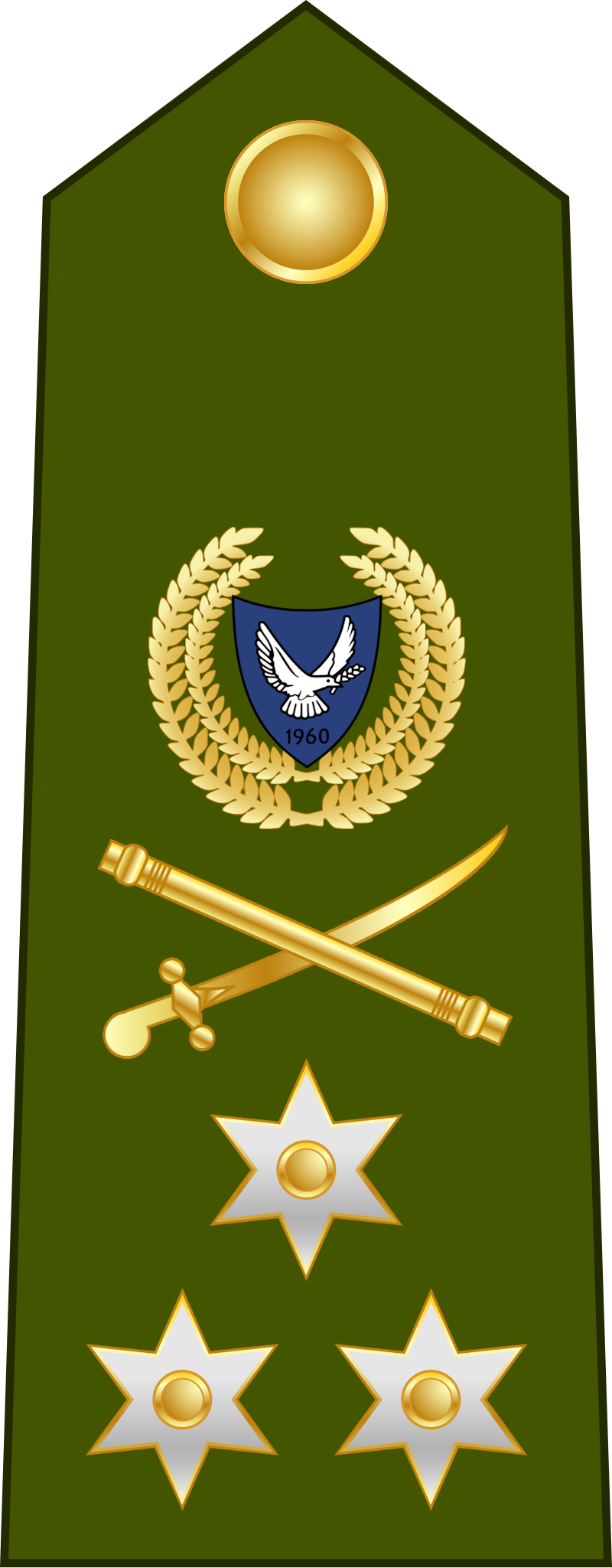
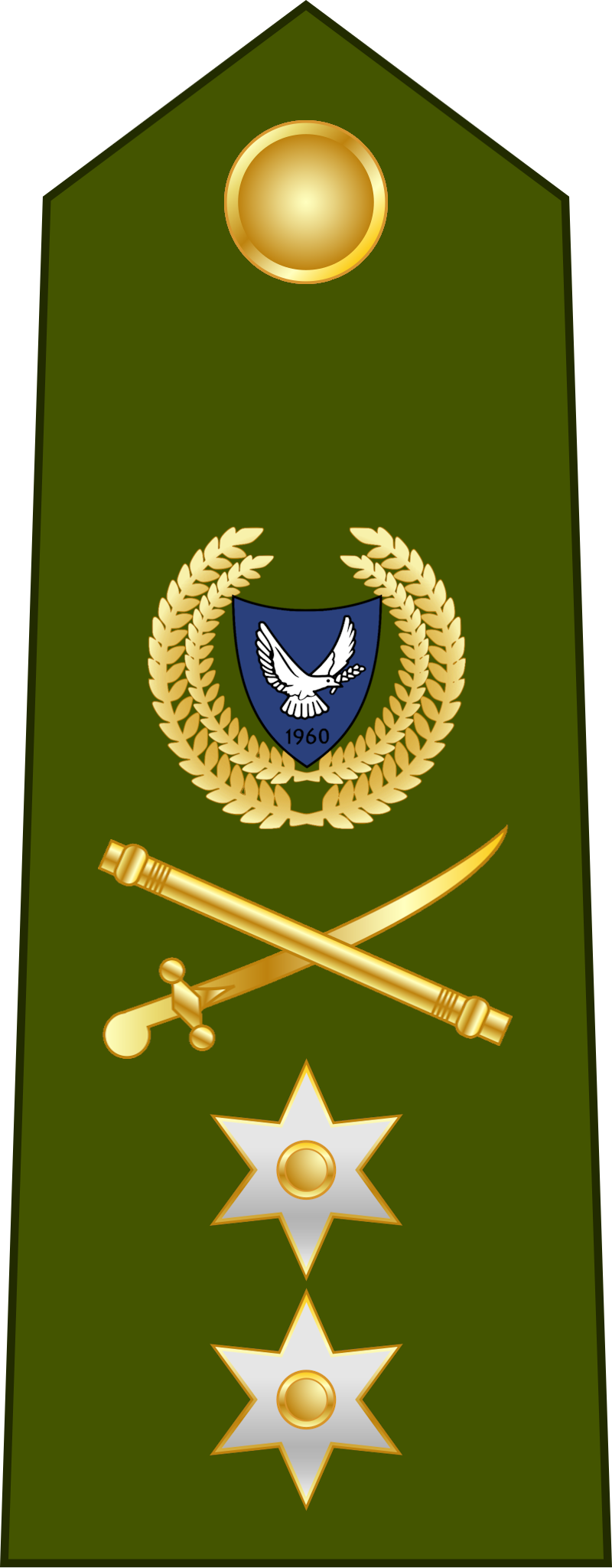
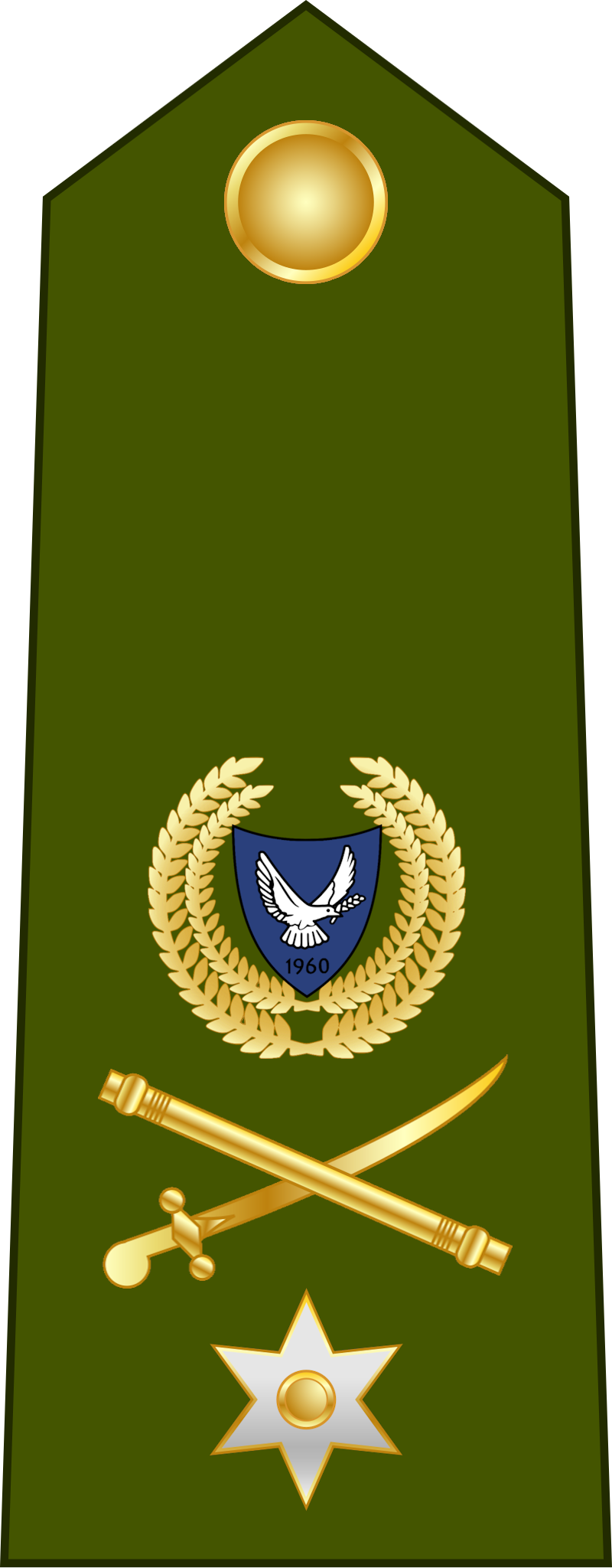
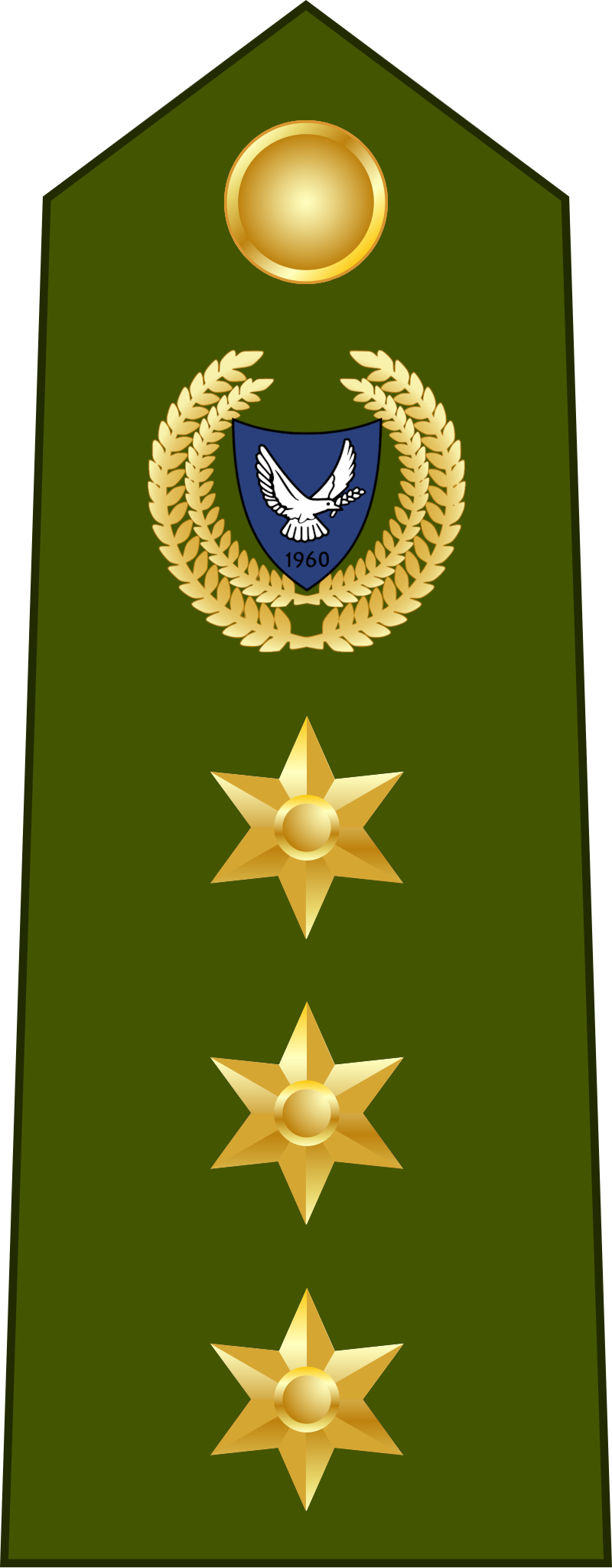
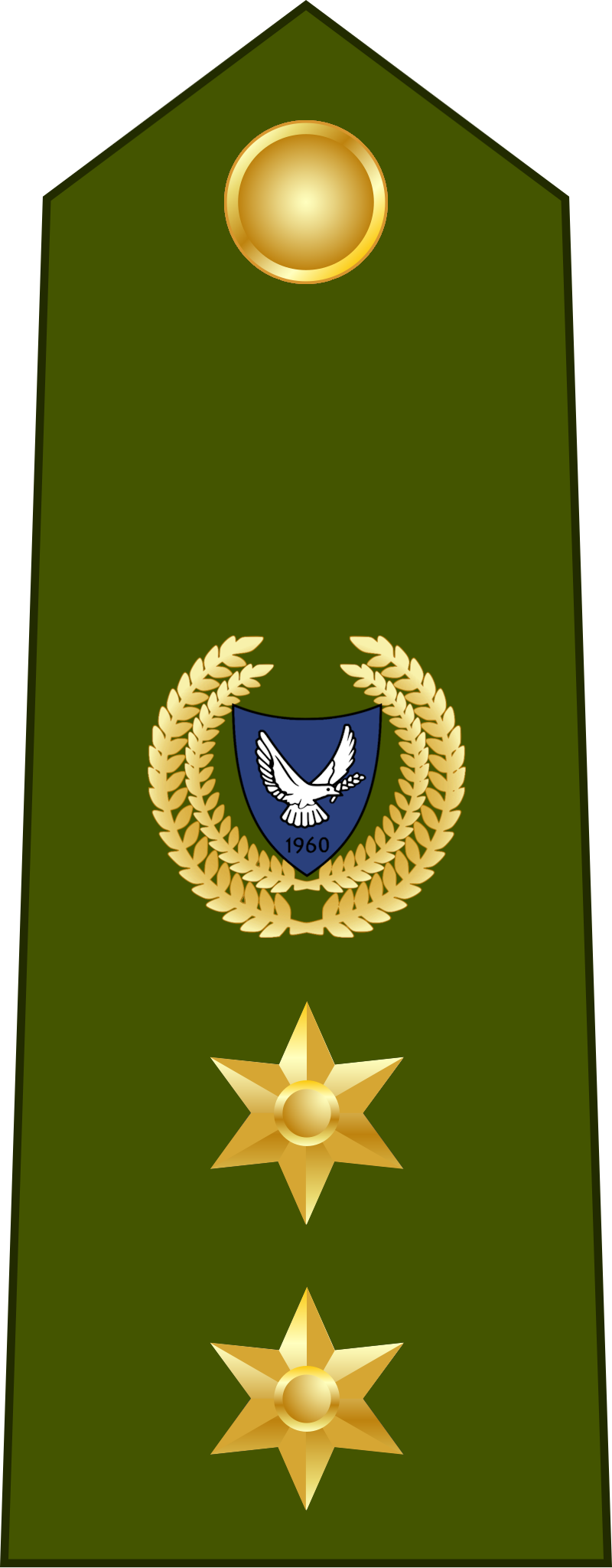
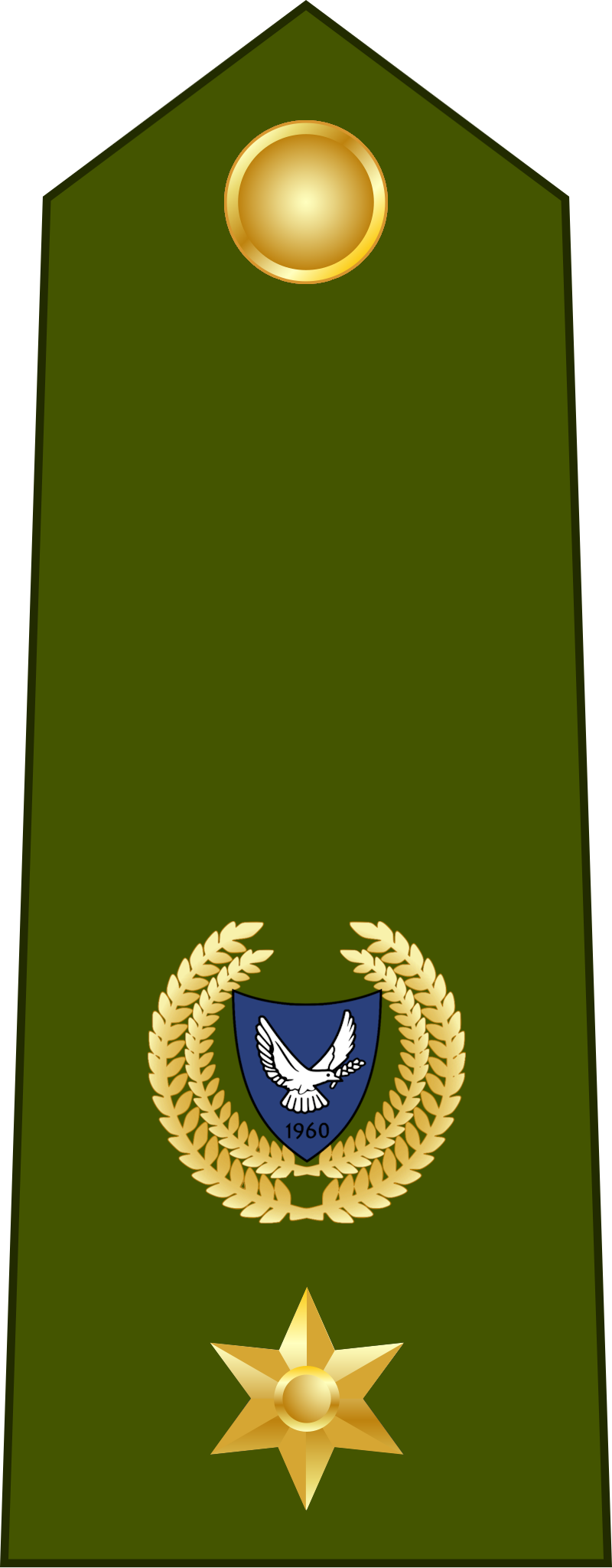
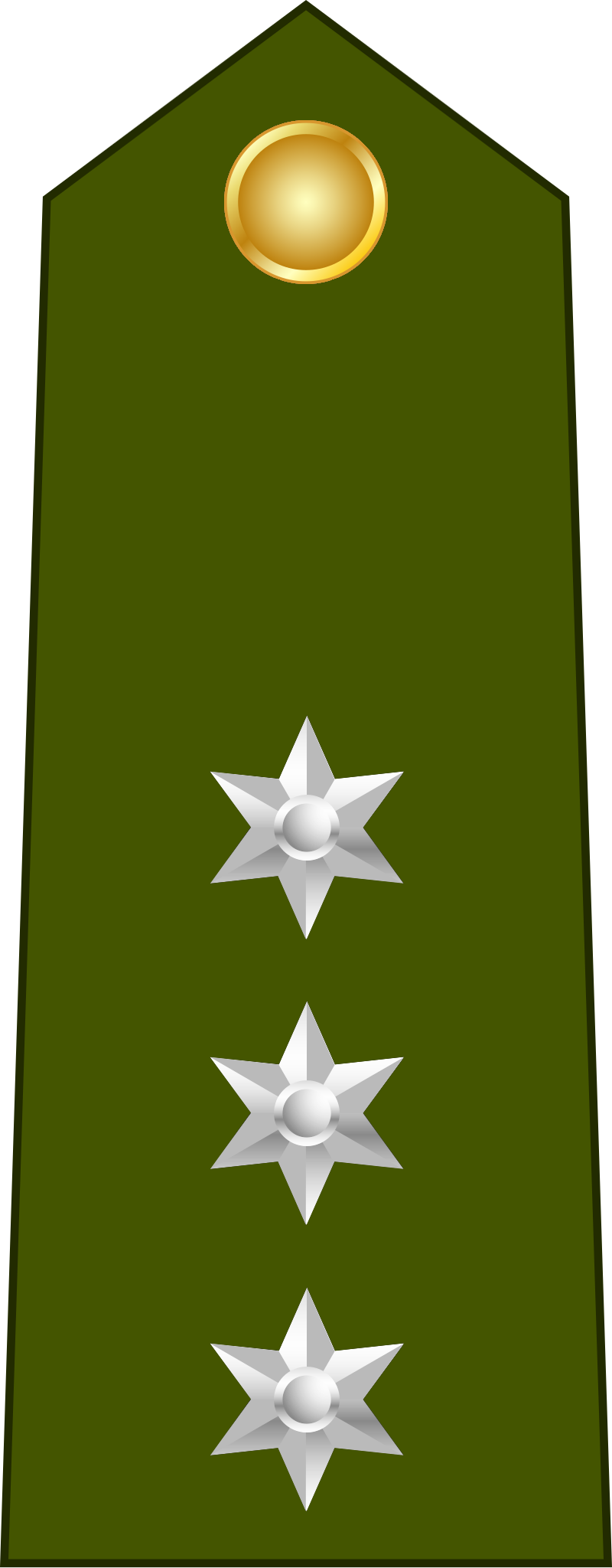
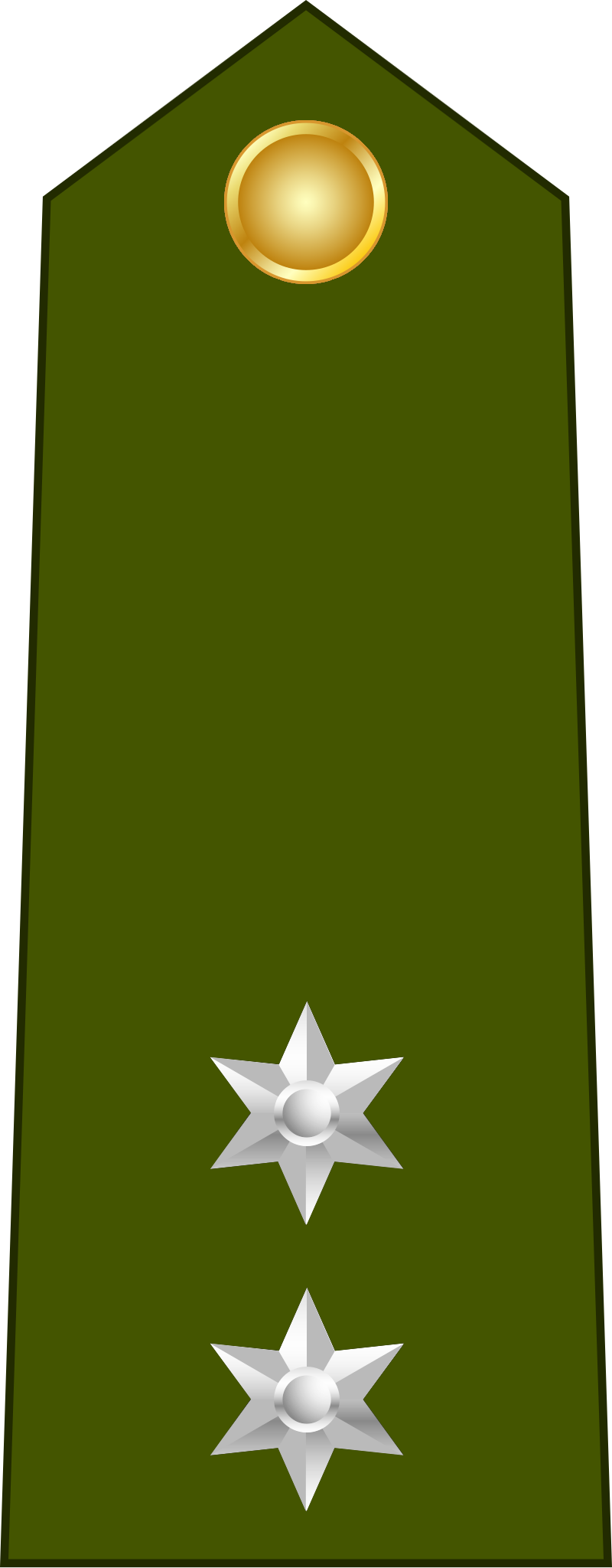
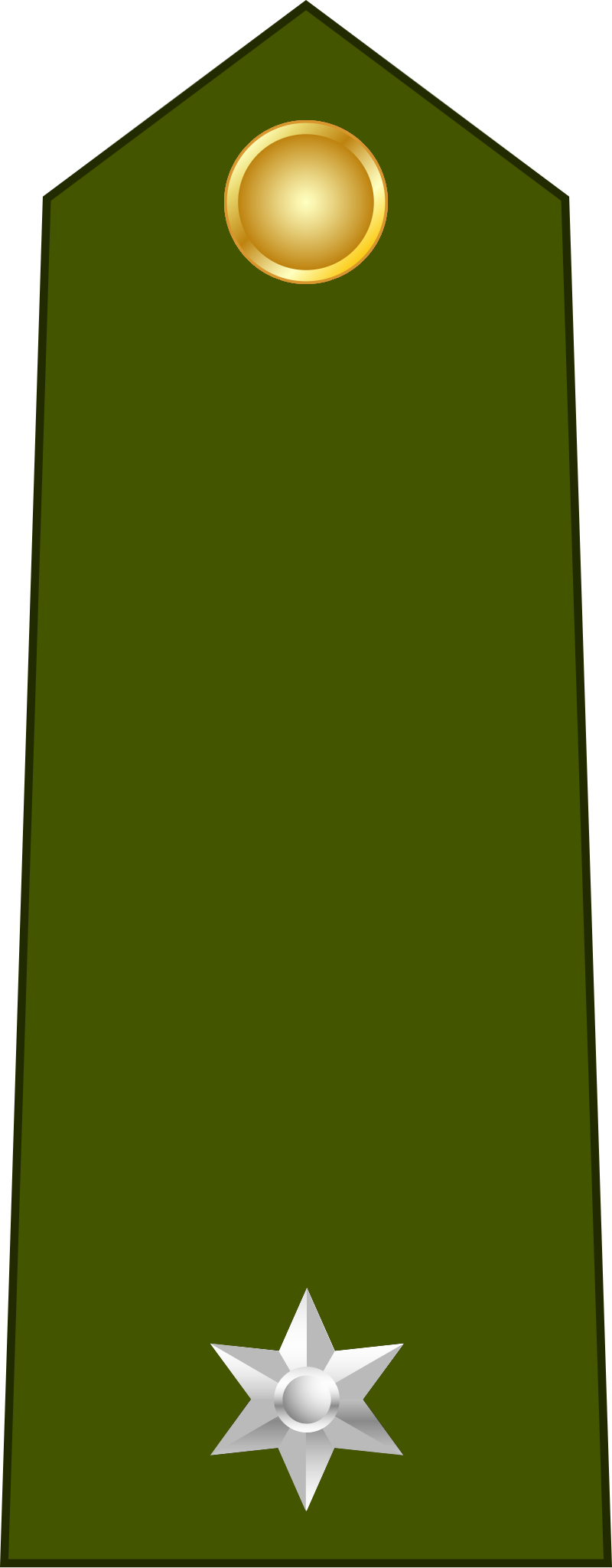
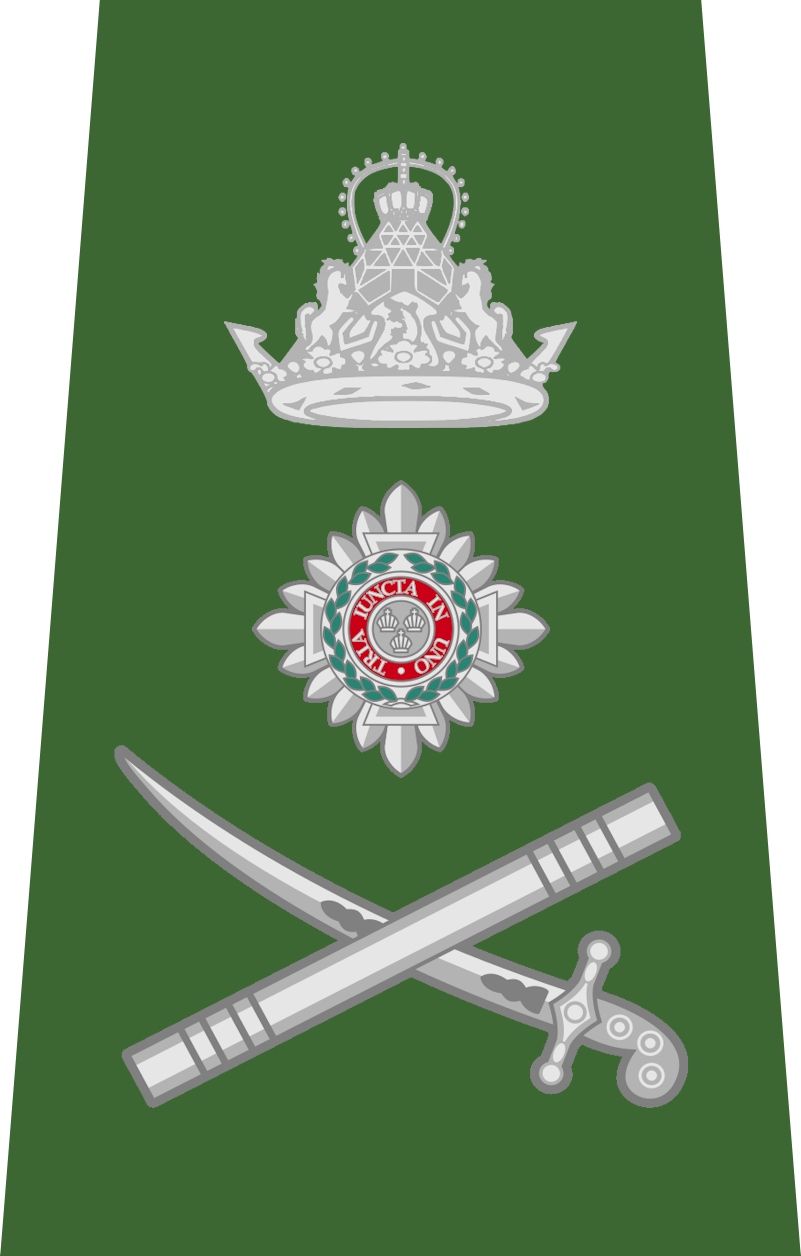
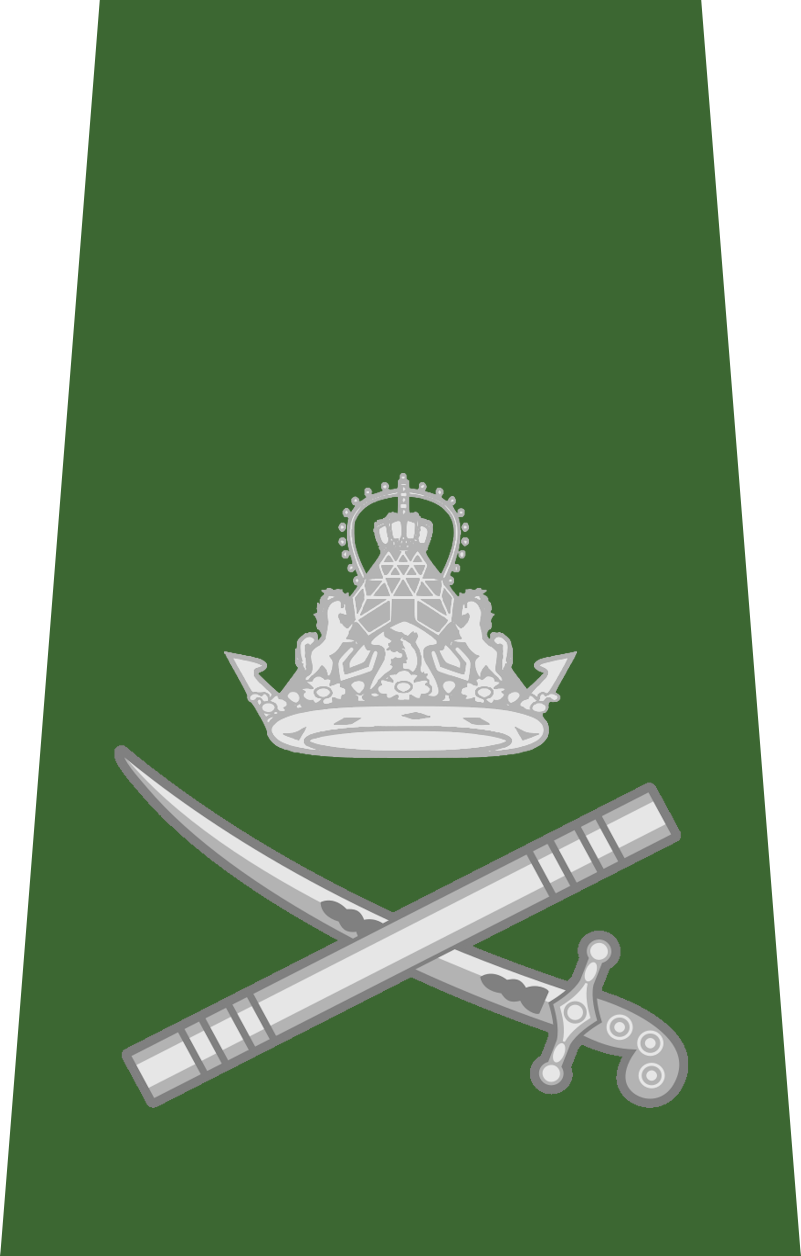
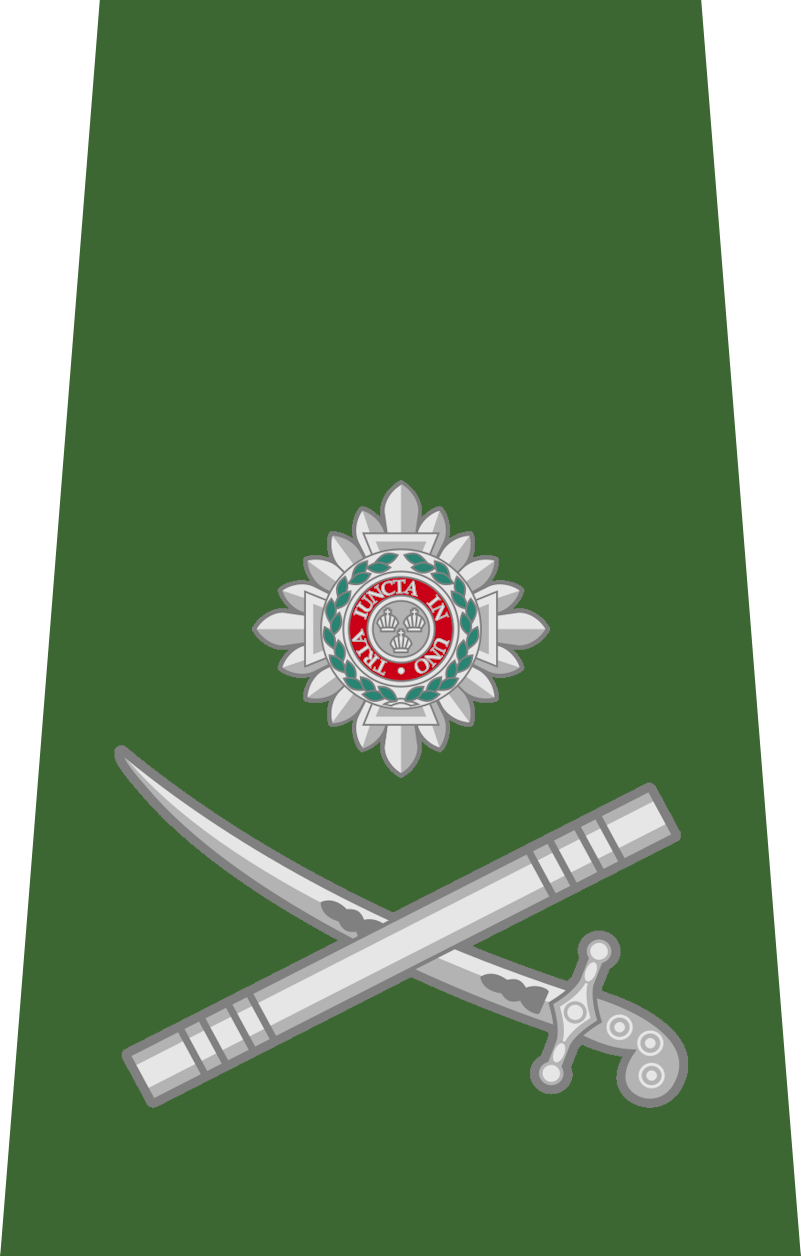
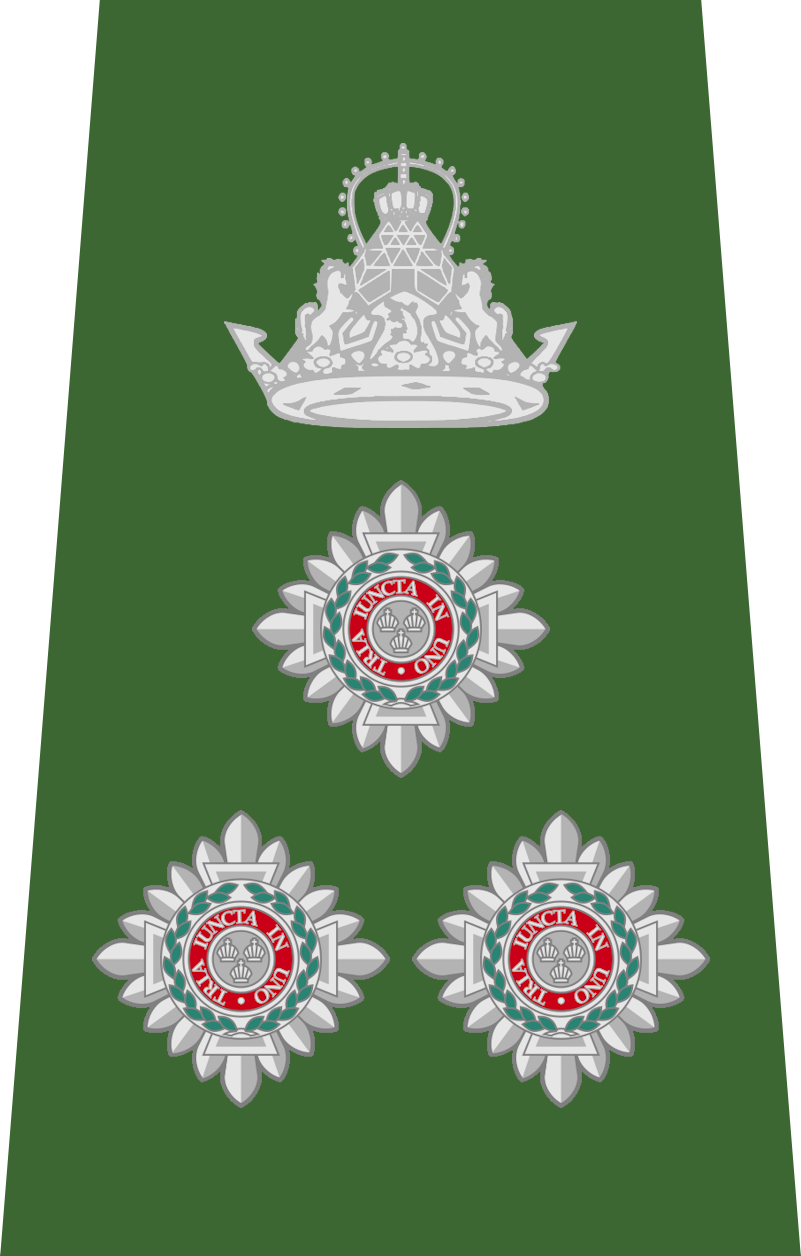
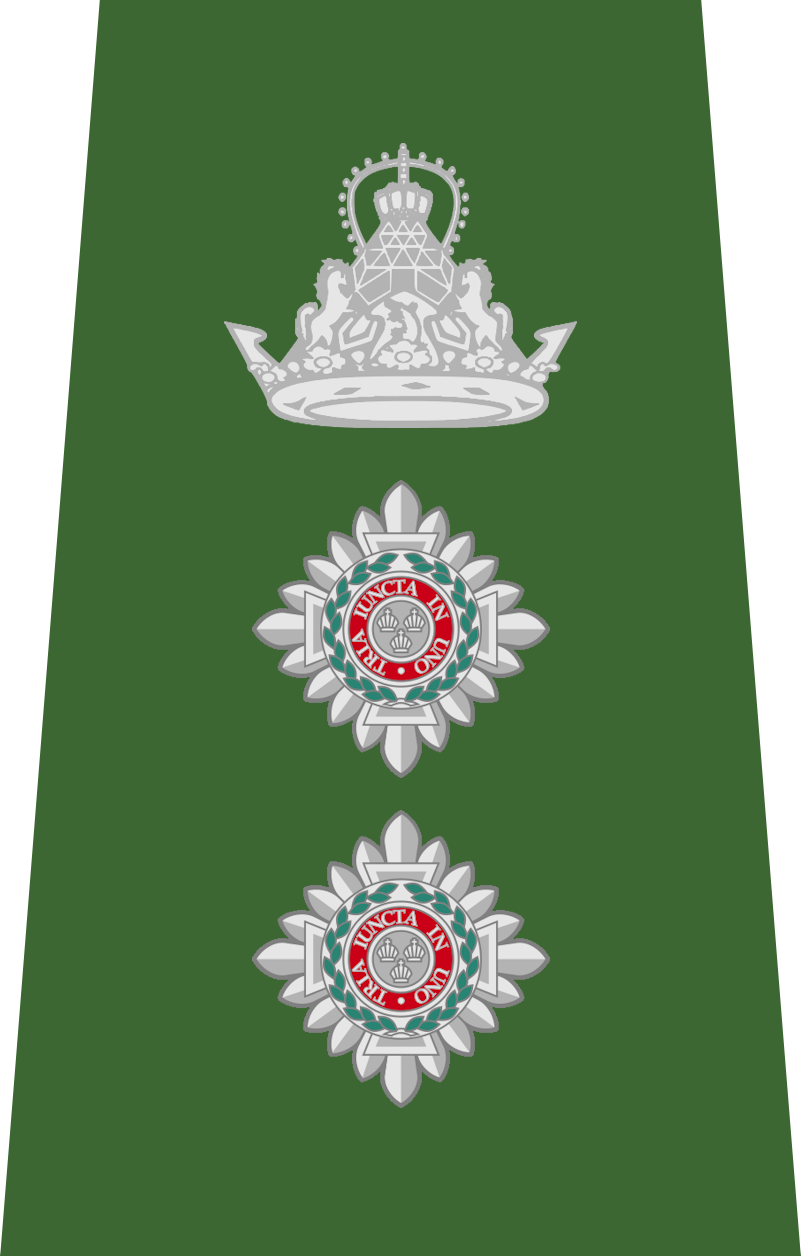
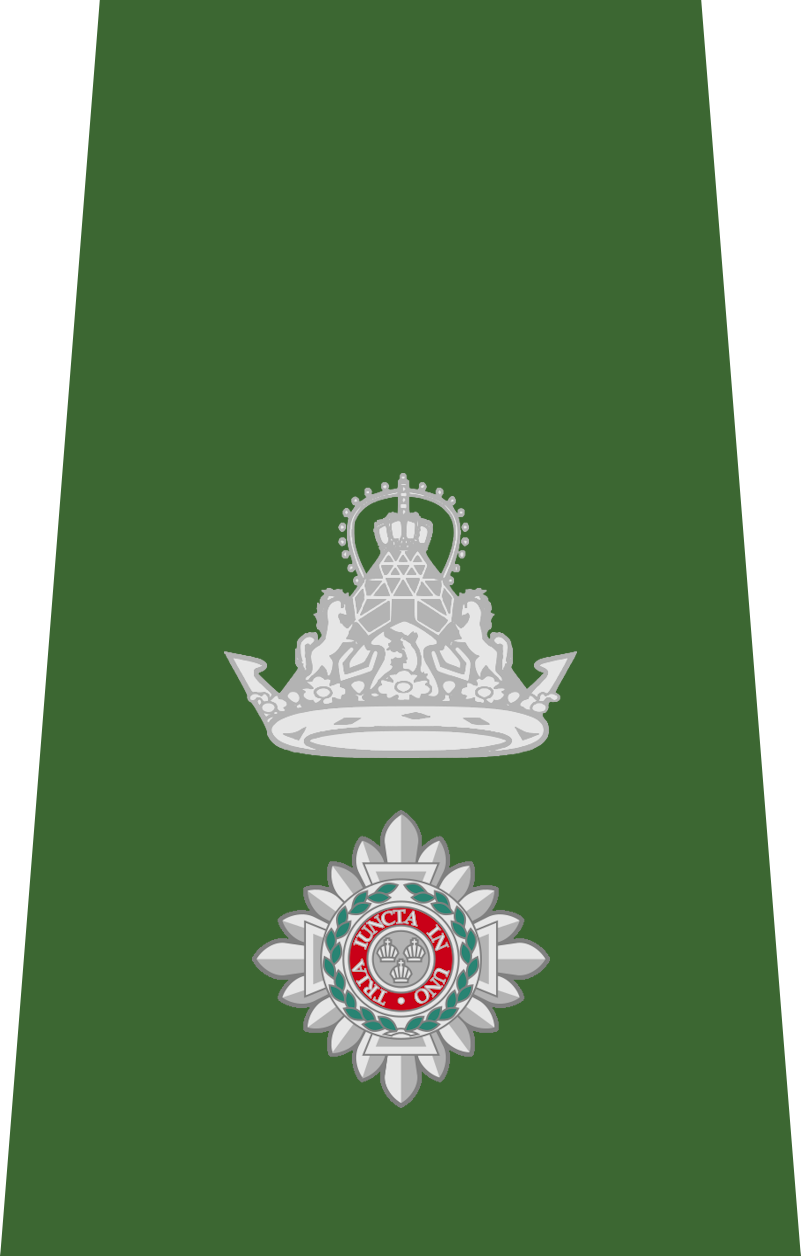
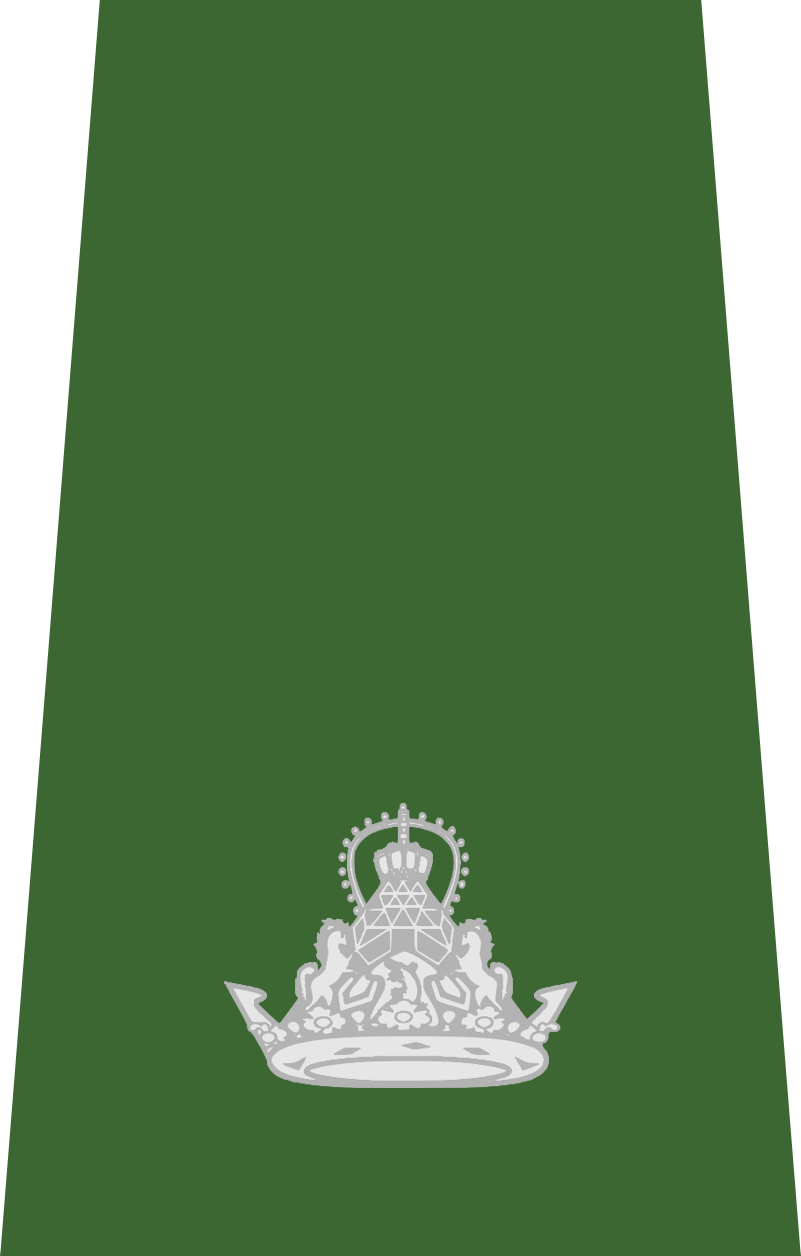
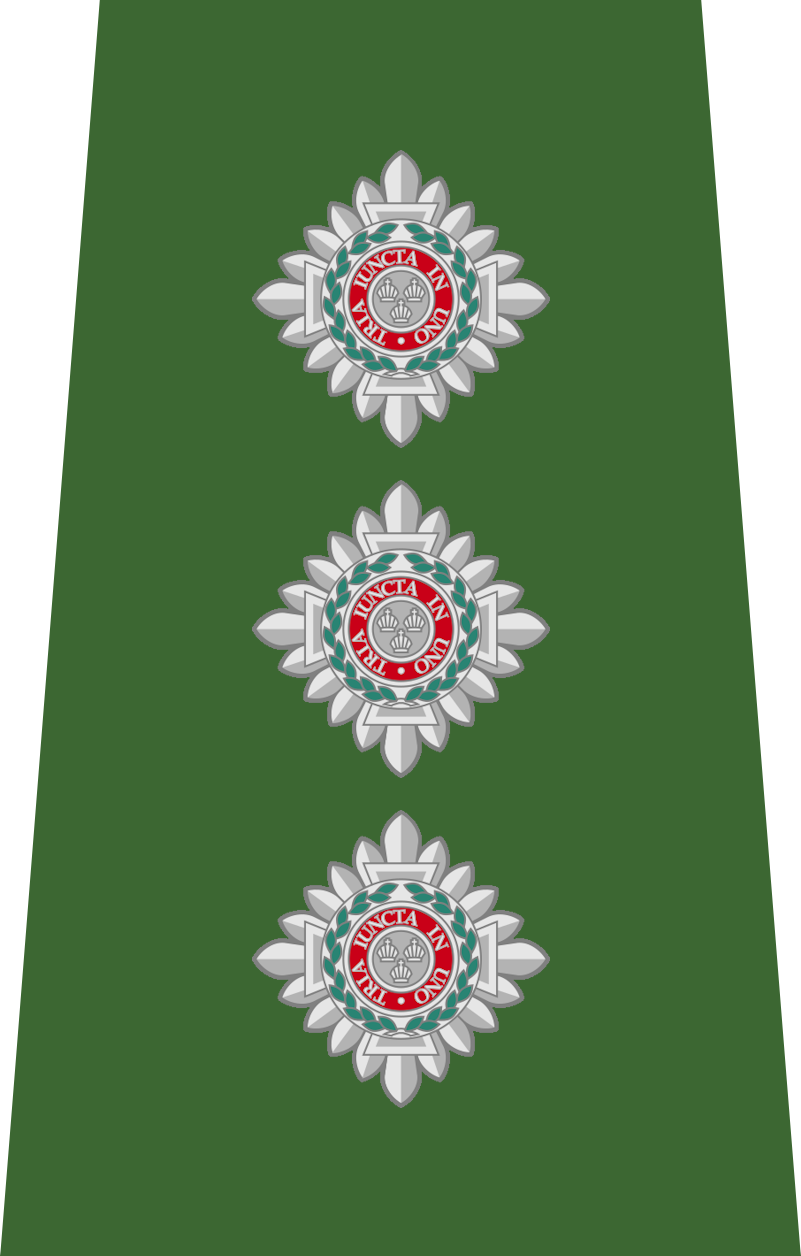
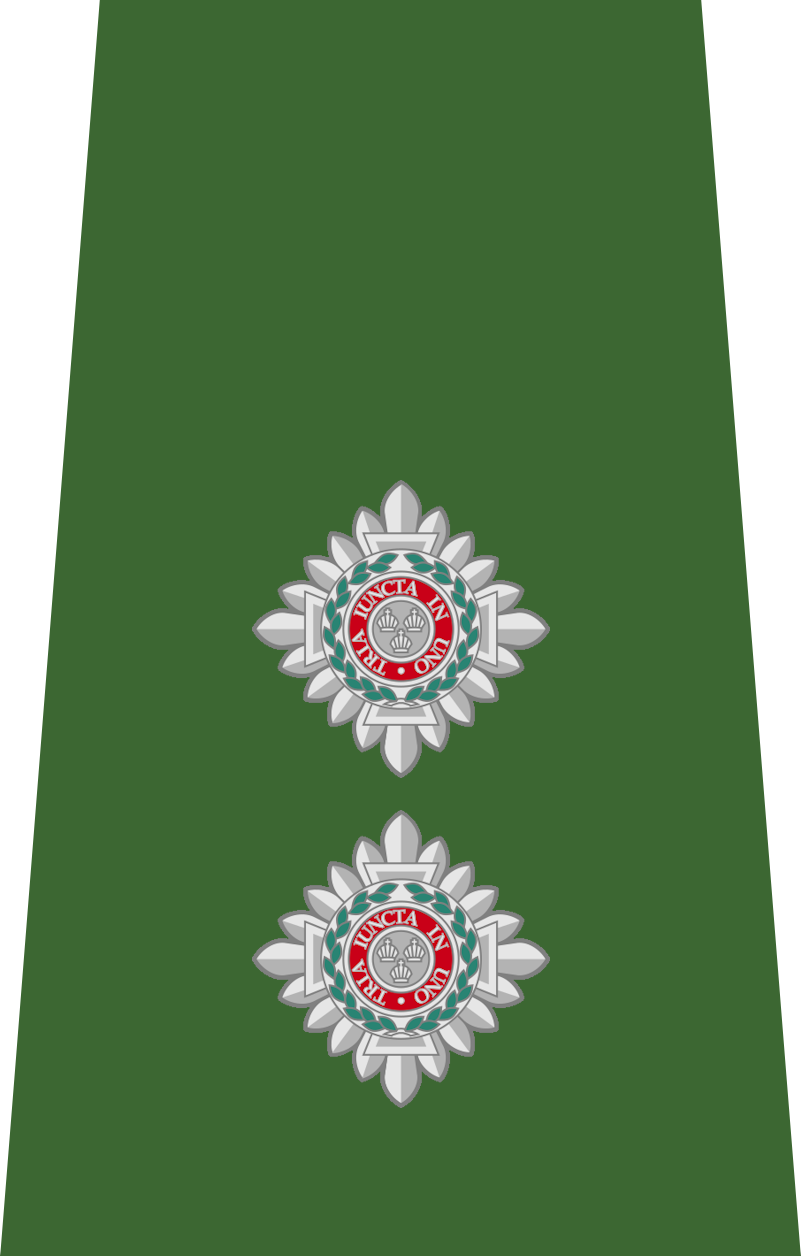
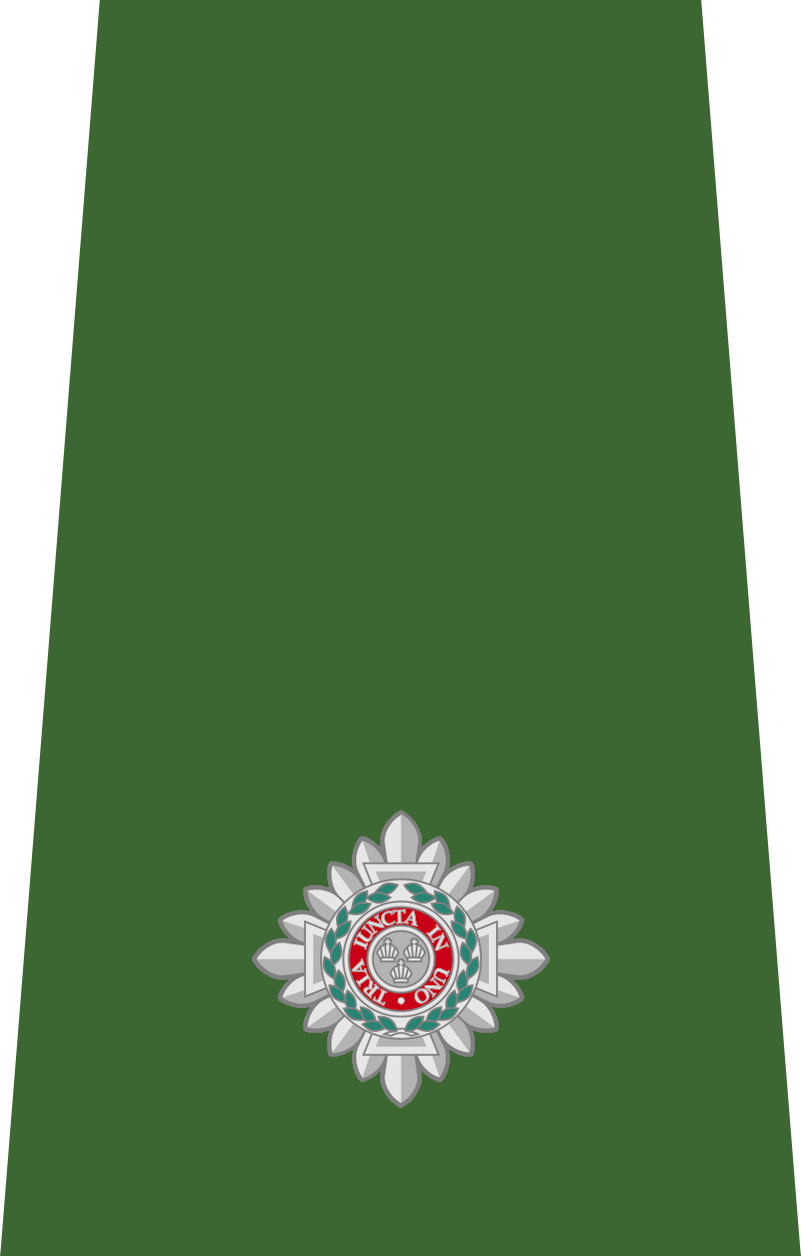
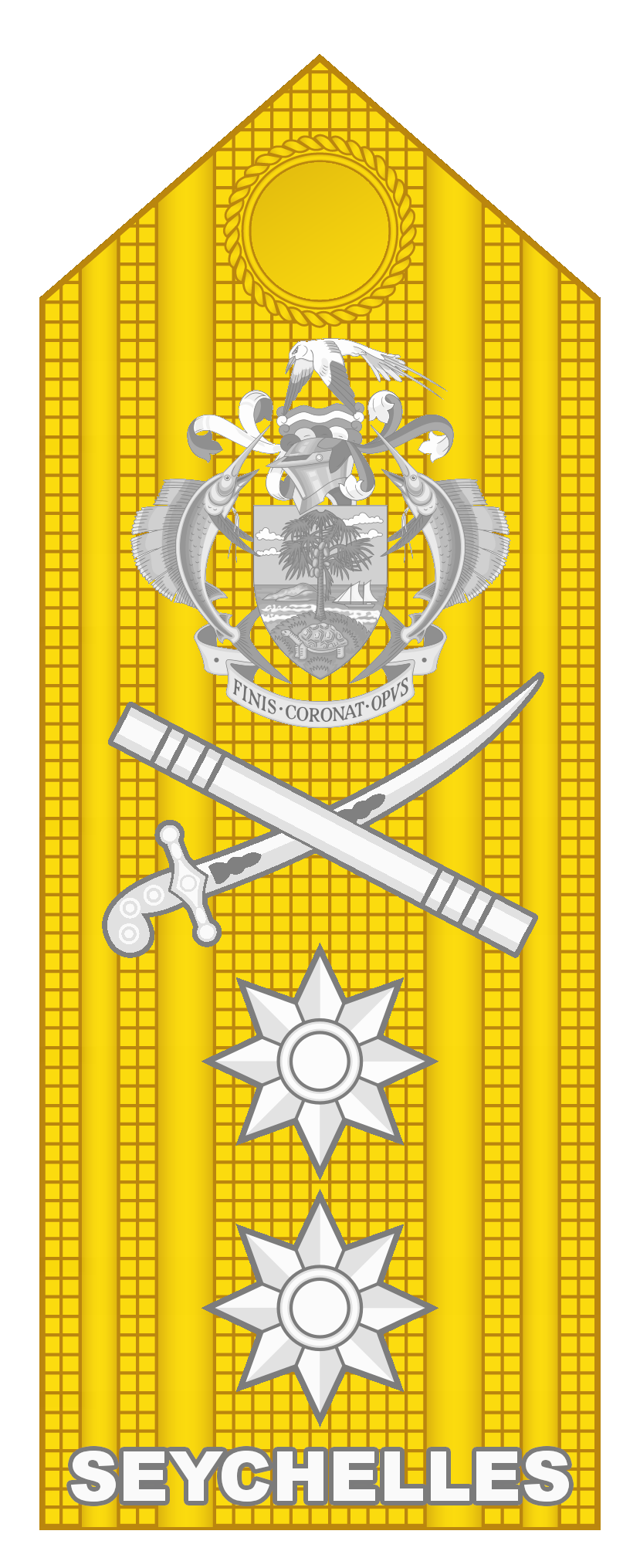
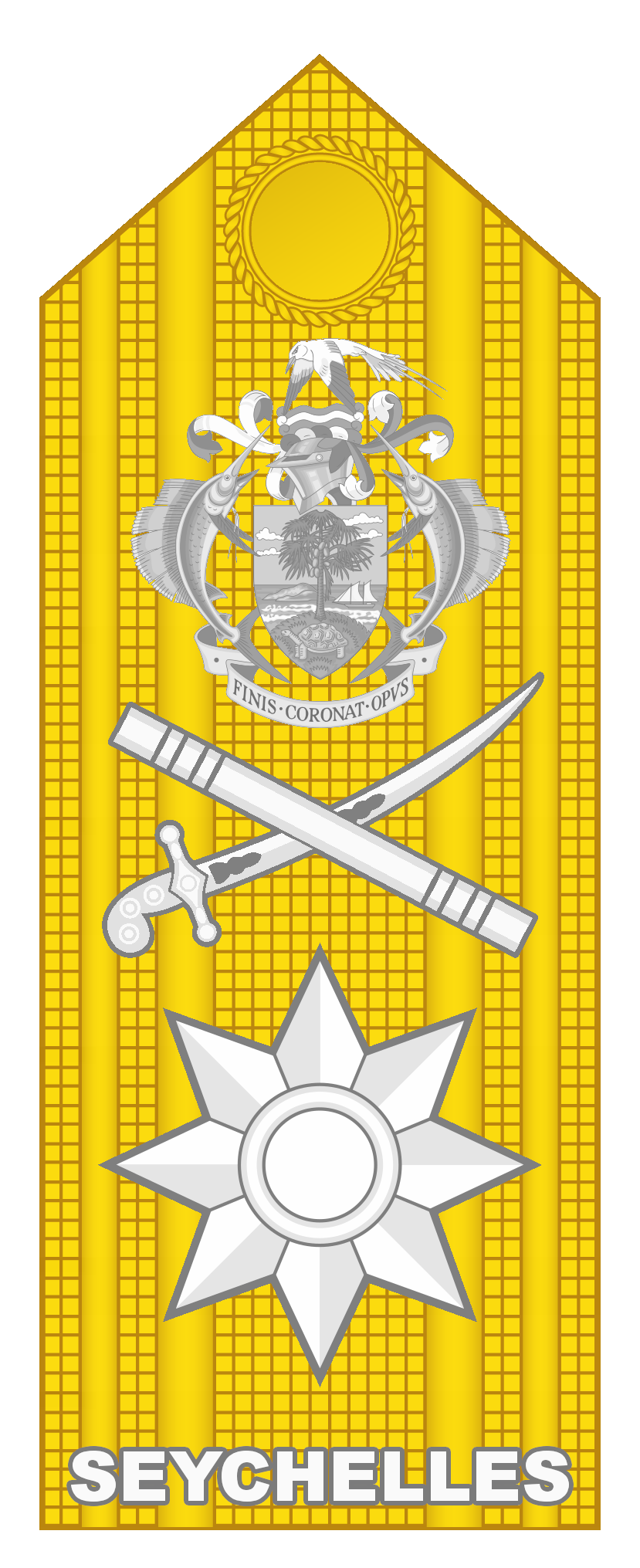
Rank group	General / flag officers					Senior officers				Junior officers
Antigua and Barbuda Regiment
Antigua and Barbuda Regiment						Colonel	Lieutenant colonel		Major	Captain	First lieutenant		Second lieutenant
Australian Army
Australian Army	Field marshal	General	Lieutenant general	Major general	Brigadier	Colonel	Lieutenant colonel		Major	Captain	Lieutenant		Second lieutenant
(The Bahamas) Bahamas	No army
Bangladesh Army
Bangladesh Army		জেনারেল; General	লেফটেন্যান্ট জেনারেল; Lieutenant general	মেজর জেনারেল; Major general	ব্রিগেডিয়ার জেনারেল; Brigadier general	কর্নেল; Colonel	লেফটেন্যান্ট কর্নেল; Lieutenant colonel		মেজর; Major	ক্যাপ্টেন; Captain	লেফটেন্যান্ট; Lieutenant		সেকেন্ড লেফটেন্যান্ট; Second lieutenant
Barbados Regiment
Barbados Regiment				Major general	Brigadier general	Colonel	Lieutenant colonel		Major	Captain	First lieutenant		Second lieutenant
Belize Defence Force
Belize Defence Force				Major-general	Brigadier general	Colonel	Lieutenant colonel		Major	Captain	Lieutenant		Second lieutenant
Botswana Ground Force
Botswana Ground Force			Lieutenant general	Major general	Brigadier	Colonel	Lieutenant colonel		Major	Captain	First lieutenant		Second lieutenant
Royal Brunei Land Force
Royal Brunei Land Force	Fil marsyal	Jeneral	Leftenan jeneral	Mejar jeneral	Brigedier jeneral	Kolonel	Leftenan kolonel		Mejar	Kapten	Leftenan		Leftenan muda
Cameroon Ground Forces
Cameroon Ground Forces		Général d'armée	Général de corps	Général de division	Général de brigade	Colonel	Lieutenant-colonel		Commandant	Capitaine	Lieutenant		Sous-lieutenant
Canadian Army
Canadian Army		General	Lieutenant-general	Major-general	Brigadier-general	Colonel	Lieutenant-colonel		Major	Captain	Lieutenant		Second lieutenant
Canadian Army		Général(e)	Lieutenant(e)-général(e)	Major(e)-général(e)	Brigadier(ère)-général(e)	Colonel(le)	Lieutenant(e)-colonel(le)		Major(e)	Capitaine	Lieutenant(e)		Sous-lieutenant(e)
Cypriot Ground Forces
Cypriot Ground Forces			Αντιστράτηγος; Antistratigos	Υποστράτηγος; Ypostratigos	Ταξίαρχος; Taxiarchos	Συνταγματάρχης; Syntagmatarchis	Αντισυνταγματάρχης; Antisyntagmatarchis		Ταγματάρχης; Tagmatarchis	Λοχαγός; Lochagos	Υπολοχαγός; Ypolochagos		Ανθυπολοχαγός; Anthypolochagos
Dominica	No army
Falkland Islands Defence Force
Falkland Islands Defence Force									Major	Captain	Lieutenant		Second lieutenant
Fiji Infantry Regiment
Fiji Infantry Regiment				Major general	Brigadier	Colonel	Lieutenant colonel		Major	Captain	Lieutenant		Second lieutenant
Fiji Infantry Regiment				Jenerali meja	Brigadi	Kanala	Leteni kanala		Meja	Kavetani	Leteni		Ikarua ni leteni
Gabonese Army
Gabonese Army		Général d'armée	Général de corps d'armée	Général de division	Général de brigade	Colonel	Lieutenant-colonel		Commandant	Capitaine	Lieutenant		Sous-Lieutenant
Ghana Army
Ghana Army	Field marshal	General	Lieutenant general	Major general	Brigadier	Colonel	Lieutenant colonel		Major	Captain	Lieutenant		Second lieutenant
Grenada	No army
Guyana Army
Guyana Army	Commander-in-Chief	Minister of Defence		Major general	Brigadier	Colonel	Lieutenant colonel		Major	Captain	Lieutenant	Second lieutenant	Ensign
Indian Army
Indian Army	Field marshal फील्ड मार्शल	General जनरल	Lieutenant general लेफ्टिनेंट जनरल	Major general मेजर जनरल	Brigadier ब्रिगेडियर	Colonel कर्नल	Lieutenant colonel लेफ्टिनेंट कर्नल		Major मेजर	Captain कैप्टन	Lieutenant लेफ्टिनेंट
Rank group	General / flag officers					Senior officers				Junior officers
Jamaican Army
Jamaican Army			Lieutenant general	Major general	Brigadier	Colonel	Lieutenant colonel		Major	Captain	Lieutenant		Second lieutenant
Kenya Army
Kenya Army	Commander-in-Chief	General	Lieutenant general	Major general	Brigadier	Colonel	Lieutenant colonel		Major	Captain	Lieutenant		Second lieutenant
Kiribati	No army
Lesotho Army
Lesotho Army	Field marshal		Lieutenant general	Major general	Brigadier	Colonel	Lieutenant colonel		Major	Captain	Lieutenant		Second lieutenant
Malawi Army
Malawi Army		General	Lieutenant general	Major general	Brigadier	Colonel	Lieutenant colonel		Major	Captain	Lieutenant		Second lieutenant
Malaysian Army
Malaysian Army	Fil marsyal	Jeneral	Leftenan jeneral	Mejar jeneral	Brigedier jeneral	Kolonel	Leftenan kolonel		Mejar	Kapten	Leftenan		Leftenan muda
Army of Malta
Army of Malta					Brigadier; Brigadier	Colonel; Kurunell	Lieutenant colonel Logutenent kurunell		Major; Maġġur	Captain; Kaptan	Lieutenant; Logutenent		Second lieutenant Sekond logutenent
Mauritius	No army
Mozambican Army
Mozambican Army		Coronel-general	Tenente-general	Major-general		Coronel	Tenente-coronel		Major	Capitão	Tenente		Alferes
Namibian Army
Namibian Army		General	Lieutenant general	Major general	Brigadier general	Colonel	Lieutenant colonel		Major	Captain	Lieutenant		Second lieutenant
Nauru	No army
New Zealand Army
New Zealand Army	Field marshal		Lieutenant-general	Major-general	Brigadier	Colonel	Lieutenant-colonel		Major	Captain	Lieutenant		Second lieutenant
Nigerian Army
Nigerian Army	Field marshal	General	Lieutenant general	Major general	Brigadier-general	Colonel	Lieutenant colonel		Major	Captain	Lieutenant		Second lieutenant
Pakistan Army
Pakistan Army	Field marshal فیلڈ مارشل	General جنرل	Lieutenant general لیفٹیننٹ جنرل	Major general میجر جنرل	Brigadier بریگیڈیئر	Colonel کرنل	Lieutenant colonel لیفٹیننٹ کرنل		Major میجر	Captain کیپٹن	Lieutenant لیفٹنینٹ		Second lieutenant سیکنڈ لیفٹیننٹ
Papua New Guinea Land Element
Papua New Guinea Land Element				Major general	Brigadier general	Colonel	Lieutenant colonel		Major	Captain	First lieutenant		Second lieutenant
Papua New Guinea Land Element				Meja jeneral	Brigadia jeneral	Kolonel	Leftenan kolonel		Meja	Kepten	Leftenan		Namba tu leftenan
Rwandan Land Forces
Rwandan Land Forces		General	Lieutenant general	Major general	Brigadier general	Colonel	Lieutenant colonel		Major	Captain	Lieutenant		Second lieutenant
SKN Regiment
SKN Regiment							Lieutenant-colonel		Major	Captain	Lieutenant		Second lieutenant
Rank group	General / flag officers					Senior officers				Junior officers
Saint Lucia	No army
Saint Vincent and the Grenadines	No army
Samoa	No army
Seychelles Army
Seychelles Army				Major general (Note: Introduced December 2024)	Brigadier general	Colonel	Lieutenant colonel		Major	Captain	Lieutenant		Second lieutenant
Sierra Leone Army
Sierra Leone Army		General	Lieutenant general	Major general	Brigadier	Colonel	Lieutenant colonel		Major	Captain	First lieutenant		Second lieutenant
Singapore Army		No insignia yet
Singapore Army		General	Lieutenant general	Major general	Brigadier general	Colonel	Senior lieutenant colonel	Lieutenant colonel	Major	Captain	Lieutenant		Second lieutenant
Solomon Islands	No army
South African Army
South African Army		General	Lieutenant general	Major general	Brigadier general	Colonel	Lieutenant colonel		Major	Captain	Lieutenant		Second lieutenant
Sri Lanka Army
Sri Lanka Army	Field marshal	General	Lieutenant general	Major general	Brigadier	Colonel	Lieutenant colonel		Major	Captain	Lieutenant		Second lieutenant
Eswatini Army
Eswatini Army	Field marshal	General	Lieutenant general	Major general	Brigadier	Colonel	Lieutenant colonel		Major	Captain	Lieutenant		2nd lieutenant
Tanzanian Army
Tanzanian Army		Jenerali	Luteni jenerali	Meja jenerali	Brigedia jenerali	Kanali	Luteni kanali		Meja	Kapteni	Luteni		Luteni usu
Togolese Army
Togolese Army				Général de division	Général de brigade	Colonel	Lieutenant-colonel		Commandant	Capitaine	Lieutenant		Sous-lieutenant
Tongan Land Force
Tongan Land Force					Brigadier general	Colonel	Lieutenant colonel		Major	Captain	Lieutenant		Second lieutenant
Tongan Land Force					Pilikaria seniale	Kenolo	Lafitani kenolo		Mesia	Kapiteni	Lafitani		Lafitani ua
Trinidad and Tobago Regiment
Trinidad and Tobago Regiment				Major general	Brigadier general	Colonel	Lieutenant colonel		Major	Captain	Lieutenant		Second lieutenant
Tuvalu	No army
Ugandan Land Forces
Ugandan Land Forces		General	Lieutenant general	Major general	Brigadier general	Colonel	Lieutenant colonel		Major	Captain	Lieutenant		Second lieutenant
British Army
British Army	Field marshal	General	Lieutenant-general	Major-general	Brigadier	Colonel	Lieutenant colonel		Major	Captain	Lieutenant		Second lieutenant
Vanuatu Mobile Forces
Vanuatu Mobile Forces				Major general Bigfala Jenerol	Brigadier	Colonel; Kolonel	Lieutenant colonel Lietnen Kolonel		Major; Bigfala	Captain; Kapten	First lieutenant Fas Lietnen		Second lieutenant Seken Lietnen
Zambian Army
Zambian Army		General	Lieutenant general	Major general	Brigadier	Colonel	Lieutenant colonel		Major	Captain	Lieutenant		Second lieutenant
Rank group	General / flag officers					Senior officers				Junior officers

== See also ==
- Comparative army officer ranks of the Americas
- Ranks and insignia of NATO armies officers
