= Major (Sri Lanka) =

Rank in the Sri Lanka Army

- Country: Sri Lanka
- Service branch: Sri Lanka Army
- Abbreviation: Maj
- Next higher rank: Lieutenant colonel
- Next lower rank: Captain
- Equivalent ranks: Sri Lanka Navy – Lieutenant commander Sri Lanka Air Force – Squadron leader

Major is a Senior Officer rank in the Sri Lanka Army. The rank insignia for a major is the Sri Lankan emblem. It ranks below lieutenant colonel and above captain. The equivalent is Lieutenant-Commander in the Sri Lanka Navy and Squadron Leader in the Sri Lanka Air Force.

From 1949 to 1972, in the Ceylon Army the rank insignia for a major was a crown, similar to that of the British Army Major.

A major of the Sri Lanka Army would usually commanding independent companies, squadrons and batteries, but those that were organically part of a regiment or battalion were still usually commanded by captains. They would be second-in-command of battalions in infantry or regiments (in the artillery and armoured regiments) as well as serve as Brigade majors. During the Sri Lankan Civil War majors commanded area commands known as military sectors and have commanded battalions in combat.

In 1947, at its formation the uniform of the Serjeant-at-arms of the Sri Lankan Parliament was molded on uniforms of a major.

== Notable majors ==
- Major G. S. Jayanath † PWV – Parama Weera Vibhushanaya recipient
- Major K. A. Gamage † PWV – Parama Weera Vibhushanaya recipient
- Major E. A. Nugawela - first Cabinet Minister of Education of Ceylon, later Cabinet Minister of Health, a Member of Parliament and State Council.
- Major Montague Jayawickrama – Government Ministers and Provincial Governor
- Major L. V. Gooneratne, ED - Mayor of Dehiwala - Mt Lavinia
- Major Bevis Bawa, ADC, CLI – former Aide-de-camp to the Governor of Ceylon
- Major Victor Gunasekara, CCS – former Controller of Imports Exports and Government Agent of Kegalle
- Major Deshamanya Duncan White, MBE, ED – first Ceylonese athlete to win an Olympic medal
- Major Wickremasinghe Wimaladasa – Asian games (Tehran) 400 metres gold medalist.
- Major Noel Weerakoon † – first army officer killed in action (during the 1971 Insurrection)

== See also ==
- List of Sri Lankan Generals
- Sri Lanka Army rank insignia
- Sri Lanka Navy rank insignia
- Sri Lanka Air Force rank insignia
- Sri Lanka Army
- Military of Sri Lanka
- Comparative military ranks
- Military rank
