= Lieutenant colonel (Sri Lanka) =

Rank in the Sri Lanka Army

- Country: Sri Lanka
- Service branch: Sri Lanka Army
- Abbreviation: Lt Col
- Next higher rank: Colonel
- Next lower rank: Major
- Equivalent ranks: Sri Lanka Navy – Commander; Sri Lanka Air Force – Wing commander

Lieutenant colonel (Lt Col), is an officer rank in the Sri Lanka Army. The rank is superior to major, and subordinate to colonel. The equivalent Sri Lanka Navy rank is commander, and the comparable rank in the Sri Lanka Air Force is wing commander.

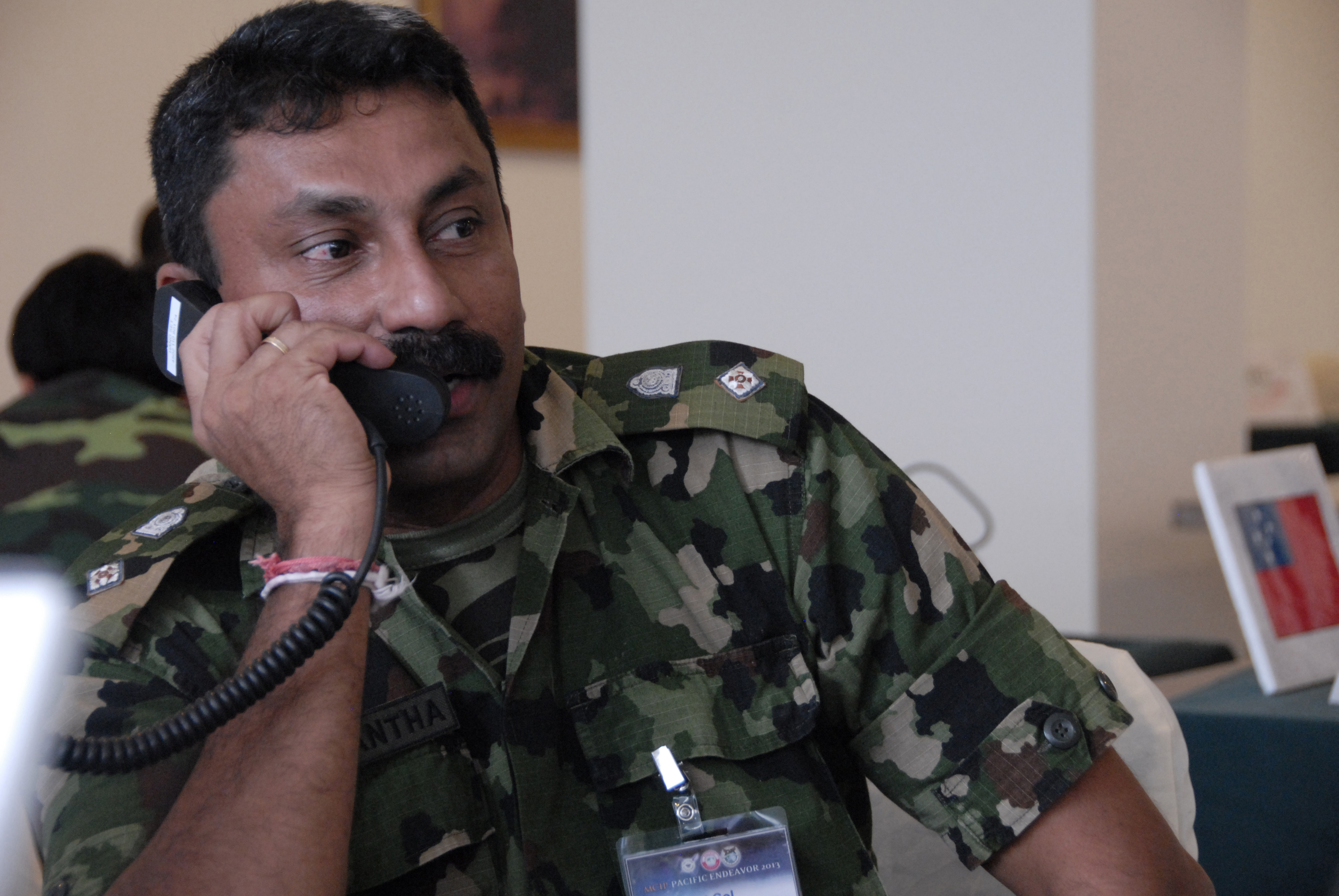
Lieutenant Colonel Priyantha Dasanayake in wearing the rank insignia of a Lieutenant colonel.

Lieutenant colonels command battalions/regiments in the army.

== Notable Lieutenant Colonels ==
- Lieutenant Colonel Lalith Jayasinghe † PWV, WWV, RWP, RSP – a special forces officer who was awarded the Parama Weera Vibhushanaya.
- Lieutenant Colonel Gotabaya Rajapaksa RWP RSP – Former President of Sri Lanka.

== See also ==
- List of Sri Lankan generals
- Sri Lanka Army ranks and insignia
- Sri Lanka Navy ranks and insignia
- Sri Lanka Air Force ranks and insignia
- Sri Lanka Army
- Military of Sri Lanka
- Comparative military ranks
- Military rank
