= Major-general (Sri Lanka) =

Major General
- Country: Sri Lanka
- Service branch: Sri Lanka Army
- Abbreviation: Maj Gen
- Rank: Two Star
- NATO rank code: OF- 7
- Formation: 1949
- Next higher rank: Lieutenant General
- Next lower rank: Brigadier
- Equivalent ranks: Sri Lanka Navy - Rear admiral Sri Lanka Air Force - Air vice-marshal

Major General (abbreviated as Maj Gen) is a general officer rank in the Sri Lanka Army, and was created as a direct equivalent of the British military rank of major general. It is the second-highest active rank of the Sri Lanka Army while the Lieutenant General is the highest (the lieutenant general is the professional head of the army), and is considered to be equivalent to a two-star rank. A major general commands a division or the equivalent or performs staff duties in army headquarters.

The Director of the National Cadet Corps holds the rank of major general. From 1958 to 1974, the Commander of the Army held the rank of Major General.

Major general is a higher rank than brigadier, but lower than lieutenant general. (Note: Many people are confused that "major general" is a lower rank than "lieutenant general", because they expect it to reflect that "major" is higher rank than "lieutenant". The reason is that the title "major general" is derived from "sergeant major general" while "lieutenant" means deputy.) The rank has a NATO rank code of OF-7, equivalent to a Rear admiral in the Sri Lanka Navy or an air vice-marshal in the Sri Lanka Air Force or the air forces of many Commonwealth countries.

== History ==
The first Sri Lankan officer to be promoted to the rank of Major general was Anton Muttukumaru, who was the first Sri Lankan Commander of the Army. The rank of major general is considered a general officer and includes all entitlements associated with it. These include an Aide-de-camp, use of two star designation. Most appointments of the rank of major general comes with a commandant's quarters or residence. An officer serving as a major general would be retired after three years in the substantive rank, which is the maximum permissible service in the rank, due to lack of vacancies or not been selected for further career progression.

== Insignia ==
The rank insignia is a pip over a crossed kastana and baton. The gorget patchs of the Major General Officer pattern, two gold/silver stars on scarlet background with a gold/silver button; worn on Dress No 2A, 4, 5, 5A, 6, 6A, 6B, 7 and 8. The General Officers Large/Medium patterns, of gold colour braided (bullion wire) three oak leaves on scarlet background with a gold button, worn by the officers in the rank of major general and above for Dress No1, No 3 and 3A. For the officers of the Sri Lanka Army Medical Corps the background will be in maroon. General officers of the rank of major-general and above carry the Kastane sword.

The ceremonial uniform of the Serjeant-at-arms of the Sri Lankan Parliament would be similar to a No. 1 Dress uniform of a major general with varied gorget patchs and epaulette similar to a flag officer of the Sri Lanka Navy.

== Notable Major General ==
- Major General Jagath Dias WWV, RWP, RSP, USP – Chief of Staff of the Army , GOC - 56 Division, GOC - 57 Division, Commander of Special Forces Brigade
- Major General Prasanna De Silva WWV, RWP, RSP – GOC, 56 Division, Commander Special Forces Brigade, Colonel of the Regiment Commando
- Major General Percy Fernando † RWP, RSP – Deputy GOC, 54 Division, brigade commander of the Special Forces Brigade
- Major General Janaka Perera, RWP, RSP, VSV, USP, VSP – Chief of Staff, Command Northern Sector, GOC - 53 Division
- Major General Vijaya Wimalaratne † RWP, RSP, VSV, USP – Commander, 21 "Jaffna" Brigade, Amphibious Task Force, 14 Division, 1st Brigade, 1st Gajaba Battalion
- Major General Lucky Wijayaratne † RWP, RSP – GOC - 22nd Trincomalee Brigade

== See also ==
- Sri Lanka Army ranks and insignia
- Sri Lanka Navy rank insignia
- Sri Lanka Air Force rank insignia
- Sri Lanka Army
- Military of Sri Lanka
- Comparative military ranks
- Military rank
