= Colonel (Sri Lanka) =

Military rank of Sri Lanka

- Country: Sri Lanka
- Service branch: Sri Lanka Army
- Abbreviation: Col
- NATO rank code: OF- 5
- Formation: 1949
- Next higher rank: Brigadier
- Next lower rank: Lieutenant colonel
- Equivalent ranks: Sri Lanka Navy – Captain; Sri Lanka Air Force – Group Captain

Colonel (Col) is a senior officer rank in the Sri Lanka Army that is a superior rank to lieutenant colonel and subordinate to Brigadier. The rank has a NATO rank code of OF-5, equivalent to captain in the Sri Lanka Navy and group captain in the Sri Lanka Air Force. It was the highest rank in the Ceylon Defence Force.

== Colonel of the Regiment ==
The title Colonel of the Regiment (to distinguish it from the military rank of colonel) continues to be used in the modern Sri Lanka Army. The ceremonial position is often conferred on retired general officers, brigadiers or colonels who have a close link to a particular regiment. When attending functions as "Colonel of the Regiment", the titleholder wears the regimental uniform with rank insignia of (full) colonel, regardless of their official rank. A Colonel of the Regiment is expected to work closely with a regiment and its Regimental Association.

== Insignia ==
The rank insignia for a colonel is a Sri Lanka emblem over two "pips".

== Notable colonels ==
- Colonel A.F. Lafir † PWV, RWP, RSP – Special Forces Regiment – recipient of the highest Sri Lankan military decoration, the Parama Weera Vibhushanaya
- Colonel C. A. Dharmapala, OBE, ED – Gemunu Watch – Parliamentary Secretary to the Minister of Industries, Housing and Social Services and Member of Parliament for Hakmana. He also served as the permanent secretary to the Ministry of Defence, and as Security Adviser to President J. R. Jayewardene.
- Colonel Maurice de Mel – Chief of Staff of the Ceylon Army and Commandant of the Ceylon Volunteer Force.
- Colonel Tuan Nizam Muthaliff † RWP – commanding officer, 1 Military Intelligence Corps
- Colonel Tuan Rizli Meedin † RSP Senior Staff Officer, RHQ, Military Intelligence Corps, commanding officer of the 2 Military Intelligence Corps

== See also ==
- Sri Lanka Army ranks and insignia
- Sri Lanka Navy rank insignia
- Sri Lanka Air Force rank insignia
- Sri Lanka Army
- Military of Sri Lanka
- Comparative military ranks
- Military rank
