= Lieutenant-general (Sri Lanka) =

Rank in Sri Lankan Army

Lieutenant-general ලුතිනන් ජෙනරාල් (Sinhala)
- Country: Sri Lanka
- Service branch: Sri Lanka Army
- Abbreviation: Lt Gen
- Rank group: General officer
- Formation: 1949
- Next higher rank: General
- Next lower rank: Major general
- Equivalent ranks: Vice admiral Air marshal

Lieutenant general (abbreviated as Lt. Gen.; Sinhala: ලුතිනන් ජෙනරාල්, romanized: Lutinan Jenaral) is the second-highest rank of the Sri Lanka Army and generally it is the highest active rank as the Sri Lanka army do not have any appointment in the rank of full general but in the case of the appointment of Chief of Defence Staff, the rank of full general is given (if the chief is appointed from the army and not from the navy or the air force). It was created as a direct equivalent of the British military rank of lieutenant general, and is considered a three-star rank.

The rank of lieutenant general is held by the Commander of the Army. The rank was also held when an army officer served as the General Officer Commanding, Joint Operations Command between 1985 and 1991.

Lieutenant-general is a superior rank to major-general, but subordinate to a full general, which is awarded to the Chief of the Defence Staff or as a ceremonial rank. The rank is equivalent to a vice-admiral in the Sri Lanka Navy and an air marshal in the Sri Lanka Air Force (SLAF) and the air forces of many Commonwealth countries. Unlike other ranks, a lieutenant-general does not have a maximum permissible service period to hold the rank before having to retire due to lack of promotion to the next rank.

== Insignia ==
The rank insignia for rank is a Sri Lanka emblem over a crossed kastana and baton. The Gorget patches of the Lieutenant General officer pattern, three gold/silver stars on scarlet background with a gold/silver button; worn on Dress No 2A, 4, 5, 5A, 6, 6A, 6B, 7 and 8. The commander of the army of the rank of lieutenant general would have an oak leaf chain of two oak leaves in gold colour at the bottom of their gorget patches. The Gorget patches of the General Officers Large/Medium patterns, of gold colour braided (bullion wire) three oak leaves on scarlet background with a gold button, worn by the officers in the rank of major general and above for Dress No1, No 3 and 3A.

== History ==
In 1974, then commander of the army, Sepala Attygalle was promoted to the rank of lieutenant-general. Since then all army commanders retired with the rank of lieutenant-general and Tissa Weeratunga and Cyril Ranatunga served as general officer commanding, Joint Operations Command with the rank of lieutenant-general. Ranatunga was appointed directly to the rank of lieutenant-general, without holding the rank of major-general having been recalled from retirement. Since 1986, the serving commander of the army held the rank of lieutenant-general. Since 1991, it became customary for all commanders of the army to be promoted to the rank of general on the final day of service if they were retiring or appointed as Chief of the Defence Staff. In 2007, two former commanders of the army were also promoted to the rank of general. In addition to officers appointed as Army Commander or GOC, Joint Operations Command; four officers of the rank of major general have been promoted to the rank of lieutenant general; three of these have been promoted posthumously as these officers either had been killed in action or assassinated.

== Notable Lieutenant Generals ==
- Lieutenant General Denzil Kobbekaduwa † RWP, RSP, VSV, USP – Command Northern Sector, Eastern Sector, 2nd Division, 1st Division, 3rd Brigade, 1st Reconnaissance Regiment
- Lieutenant General Parami Kulatunga † RSP, VSV, USP – 18th Deputy Chief of Staff
- Lieutenant General Henry Athukorale VSV – Commandant, Volunteer Force, Commander, Task Force Anti Illicit Immigration
- Lieutenant General Nalin Angammana † RSP, USP – General Officer Commanding, 3 Division

== See also ==
- Sri Lanka Army ranks and insignia
- Sri Lanka Navy rank insignia
- Sri Lanka Air Force rank insignia
- Sri Lanka Army
- Military of Sri Lanka
- Comparative military ranks
- Military rank
