= No. 3 Squadron SLAF =

No. 03 Maritime Squadron
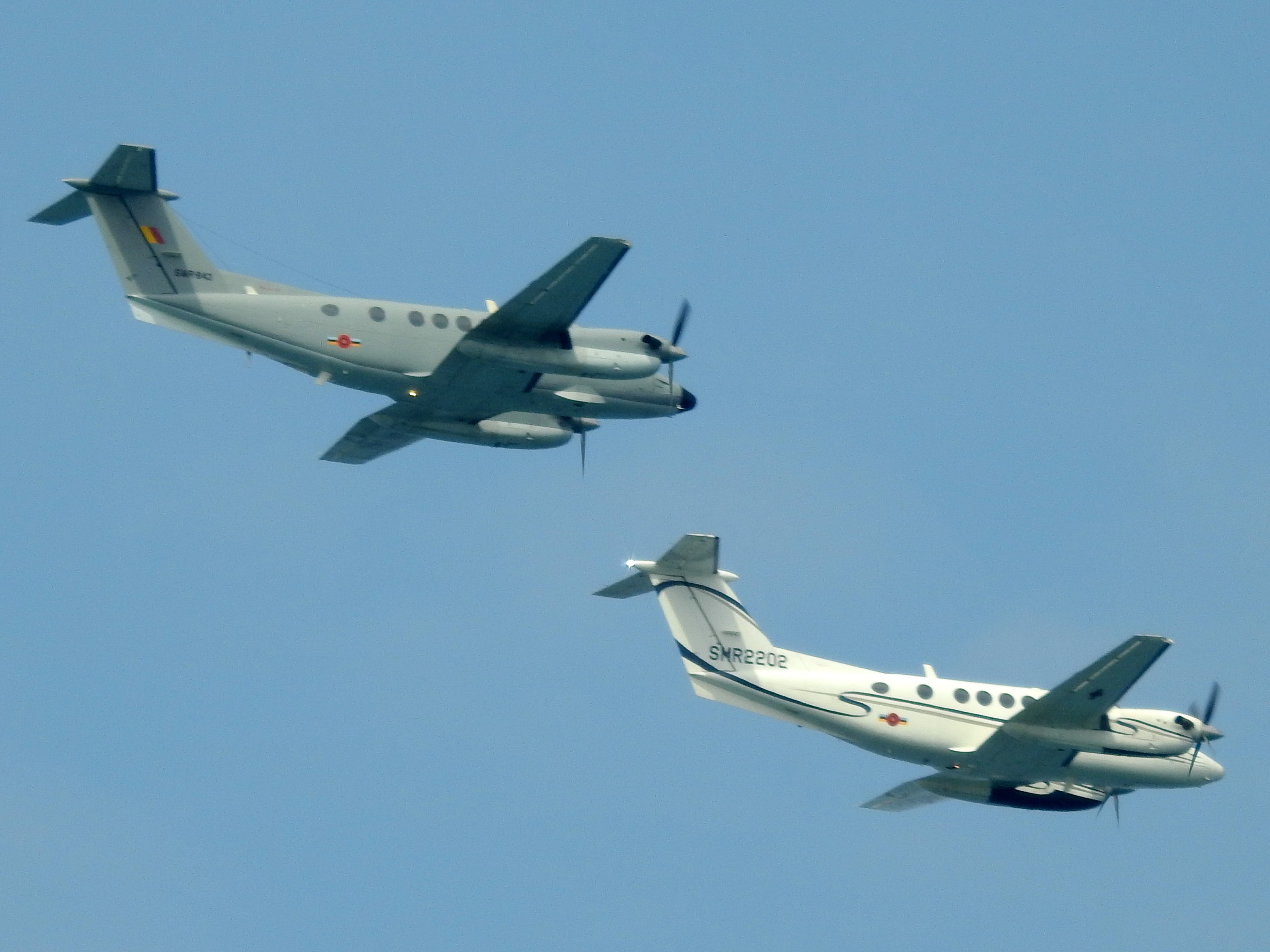
- Active: 1971 - 1993; 2019-present
- Country: Sri Lanka
- Branch: Sri Lanka Air Force
- Role: Maritime patrol
- Station: SLAF China Bay
- Engagements: Sri Lankan Civil War

No. 3 Maritime Squadron is a maritime patrol squadron of the Sri Lanka Air Force. It was disbanded in 1993 and its aircraft taken over by the No. 8 Light Transport Squadron. It was reestablished in 2019.

== History ==
Maritime Squadron was established in 1971 at SLAF China Bay to provide early warning by them air force commander Paddy Mendis, its units took part in operational duties during the 1971 JVP insurrection. The Squadron shifted to SLAF Katunayake and again relocated to SLAF Base China Bay in the year 1988 to conduct surveillance operations against the LTTE

The SLAF has been in talks to acquire both Dornier Do228 and Kingair B360ER maritime reconnaissance aircraft from India and the United States respectively to enhance their operations since 2020. In 2022, the Squadron had been earmarked for expansion with the US Government agreed to provide two Beechcraft 360ER on a gratis basis under a foreign military sales contract to enhance the SLAF's maritime reconnaissance capability. and the Indian government lending a Dornier Do228 with technical assistants as part of defense agreements around the establishment of a Maritime Rescue Coordinating Centre. Sri Lanka will purchase two more Dorniers on an Indian line of credit. The first Dornier was delivered in August 2022.

== Aircraft operated ==
=== Current aircraft ===
- Beech King Air B200
- Beechcraft King Air 360ER - Inducted in 2024
- Dornier 228
- Beechcraft King Air 350 - Inducted in 2024

=== Former aircraft ===
- Cessna Skymaster - 1978
- De Havilland Dove - 1971
- Beechcraft Super King Air - 1986

== Notable members ==
- Marshal of the Sri Lanka Air Force Roshan Goonatilake, RWP & BAR, VSV, USP, ndc, psc, SLAF
