= Brigadier (Sri Lanka) =

Army rank

- The brigadier insignia
- Country: Sri Lanka
- Service branch: Sri Lanka Army
- Abbreviation: Brig
- Rank group: Field officer
- Rank: One-star
- Next higher rank: Major-general
- Next lower rank: Colonel
- Equivalent ranks: Commodore (Sri Lanka Navy); Air commodore (Sri Lanka Air Force)

Brigadier (Brig) is a senior rank in the Sri Lanka Army. Brigadier is a superior rank to Colonel, but inferior to Major-General. The rank has a NATO rank code of OF-6, equivalent to Commodore in the Sri Lanka Navy and Air Commodore in the Sri Lanka Air Force. It corresponds to the rank of brigadier general in many other nations. In the Sri Lanka Army, brigadier is the highest field officer rank (hence the absence of the word "general"), whereas brigadier-general is the lowest "general" rank in many armies. However, the two ranks are considered equal.

Initially Brigadier was not considered to be a General Officer rank by the Sri Lanka Army, however since the 1980s the rank had limited recognition as a General Officer rank as the rank holders had GOC (divisional commanders) appointments, getting staff cars designated with a single star, currently brigadiers do not get the 'general' status. The rank insignia for a Brigadier is a Sri Lanka emblem over three "pips", in the British style. An officer serving as a Brigadier would be retired after four years in the substantive rank, which is the maximum permissible service in the rank, due to lack of vacancies or not been selected for further career progression.

From 1949 to 1958, the Commander of the Ceylon Army held the rank of Brigadier. From the late 1960s to the late 1980s the Chief of Staff of the Sri Lanka Army was an officer of the rank of Brigadier. The first regular officer to hold the rank was Anton Muttukumaru, while Christopher Allan Hector Perera Jayawardena was the first volunteer officer to the rank.

== Notable Brigadiers ==
- Brigadier Ariyasinghe Ariyapperuma † – Commander Sri Lanka Army Northern Command
- Brigadier Bhathiya Jayatilleka † RSP – Brigade commander 54-1 brigade of the 54 Division
- Brigadier Rohitha Neil Akmeemana † RSP, USP – Brigade Commander 54-2 brigade of the 54 Division

== See also ==
- List of Sri Lankan generals and brigadiers
- Sri Lanka Army ranks and insignia
- Sri Lanka Navy rank insignia
- Sri Lanka Air Force rank insignia
- Sri Lanka Army
- Military of Sri Lanka
- Comparative military ranks
- Military rank
