= Sri Lanka Army ranks and insignia =

The following tables present the ranks and insignia of the Sri Lanka Army. The ranks are similar to the British army officer ranks and the others.

At its formation in 1949, the Ceylon Army adopted the rank structures of the British Army.

The highest rank in the Sri Lanka Army is Field Marshal, though the rank has no appointment in the army; it was first awarded in 2015 as an honorary rank to Sarath Fonseka for his wartime service. The rank has been awarded for his whole life.

The highest rank of a serving officer is Lieutenant General (three-star rank), which the Commander of the Army holds. The rank of full general (four-star rank) was given to the Chief of Defence Staff, whose post is now obsolete; it is also awarded to the Commander of the Army on the day of his retirement. Commanders of the Army since the late 1980s have held the rank of lieutenant general, three commanders Sarath Fonseka, Jagath Jayasuriya and Shavendra Silva were promoted to full generals while serving as commander of the army, on the other hand, Shavendra Silva got the duty of the Chief of Defence Staff simultaneously holding the appointment of commander of the army.

== Commissioned officer ranks ==
The rank insignia of commissioned officers.

Rank group	General / flag officers					Senior officers			Junior officers
Sri Lanka Army
Sri Lanka Army	Field marshal	General	Lieutenant general	Major general	Brigadier	Colonel	Lieutenant colonel	Major	Captain	Lieutenant	Second lieutenant

=== Officer cadet ranks ===
Rank group	Under officers
Sri Lanka Army
Sri Lanka Army	Battalion under officer	Company under officer	Platoon under officer	Battalion sergeant major	Battalion Quarter master sergeant	Company sergeant major	Company quarter master sergeant	Sergeant	Corporal	Lance corporal

== Other ranks ==
The rank insignia of non-commissioned officers and enlisted personnel.

Rank group	Senior NCOs				Junior NCOs		Enlisted
Sri Lanka Army							No insignia
Sri Lanka Army	Warrant officer class I	Warrant officer class II	Staff sergeant (Note: For artillery personnel at this rank, the emblem is replaced by towed artillery gun. For engineering personnel at this rank, the emblem is replaced by a bursting grenade.)	Sergeant	Corporal/ Bombardier	Lance corporal/ Lance bombardier	Private (or equivalent)

== Retired officer's rank ==
An officer of or above the rank of captain when retired from service may retain his/her rank and indicate that he/she is a retired officer with the use of the abbreviation (Rtd) immediately after his/her name.

== History ==
Rank group	General / flag officers				Senior officers			Junior officers
Sri Lanka Army (1988)
Sri Lanka Army (1988)	General	Lieutenant general	Major general	Brigadier	Colonel	Lieutenant colonel	Major	Captain	Lieutenant	Second lieutenant

== See also ==
- Star Insignia of Army officer vehicles (Sri Lanka)
- Uniforms of the Sri Lanka Army

== Bibliography ==
- Army, Sri Lanka. (1st Edition - October 1999). "50 YEARS ON" - 1949–1999, Sri Lanka Army. ISBN 955-8089-02-8
