= Sri Lanka Navy ranks and insignia =

The following tables present the ranks and insignia of the Sri Lanka Navy. These ranks are similar to Royal Naval officer ranks and the ratings ranks. Sri Lanka does have an Admiral rank, but it is only awarded to the Commander of the Sri Lanka Navy on the day of his retirement and was previously given to Chief of Defence Staff which is obsolete now; Admiral Wasantha Karannagoda was the only Sri Lankan naval officer to hold a full admiral rank while in active service.

== Officer ranks ==
Rank group	General / flag officers					Senior officers			Junior officers
Sri Lanka Navy
Sri Lanka Navy	Admiral of the fleet	Admiral	Vice admiral	Rear admiral	Commodore	Captain	Commander	Lieutenant commander	Lieutenant	Sub-lieutenant	Midshipman

- Admiral of the Fleet is the highest rank in the Sri Lanka Navy and has been awarded only once, to Wasantha Karannagoda as an honorary rank. It is equivalent to Field Marshal in the Army and Marshal of the Sri Lanka Air Force in the Air Force.
- Admiral is the four-star rank of the Sri Lankan Navy. The rank of full admiral is not always given; this rank is held by a Chief of the Defence Staff (if the chief is appointed from the navy and not from the army or the air force) or is mostly awarded as a ceremonial rank to the Commander of the Navy on his day of retirement. It is the equivalent of General in the Sri Lanka Army and Air Chief Marshal in the Sri Lanka Air Force.
- Vice admiral is the three-star rank of the Sri Lankan Navy. The rank of Vice admiral is held only by the Commander of the Sri Lanka Navy. It is equivalent to Lieutenant general in the Sri Lanka Army and Air marshal in the Sri Lanka Air Force.
- Rear admiral is the two-star rank of the Sri Lankan Navy. It is equivalent to Major general in the Sri Lanka Army and Air vice marshal in the Sri Lanka Air Force. Rear admirals perform the duties of chiefs of staff and deputy chiefs of staff in the naval headquarters, and also they serve as regional commanders e.g. eastern naval command's commander.
- Commodore is the one-star rank of the Sri Lankan Navy. It is equivalent to Brigadier in the Sri Lanka Army and Air commodore in the Sri Lanka Air Force. Commodores perform various important duties in the naval headquarters like directorate's director.
- Captain is a senior officer in the Sri Lanka Navy. The rank has a NATO rank code of OF-5, equivalent to colonel in the Sri Lanka Army and group captain in the Sri Lanka Air Force. Captains have several important duties e.g. they perform as commanding officers of Sri Lanka navy ships.

=== Branch ===
Officers are assigned to a branch of the service based on their specialization. Officers of non-executive branches wear a distinction cloth worn between the stripes of a particular colour (with the exception of the Band and Provost branch):

- Scarlet - Engineering
- Orange – Medical
- White - Logistics
- Dark green - Electrical
- Silver grey - Shipwrights
- Blue - Information Technology
- Brown - Naval Patrolman
- Purple - Legal

== Other ranks ==
Rank group	Senior NCOs				Junior NCOs		Enlisted
Sri Lanka Navy						No insignia	No insignia
Sri Lanka Navy	Master chief petty officer	Fleet chief petty officer	Chief petty officer	Petty officer	Leading seaman	Able seaman	Seaman recruit

=== Trade branch of sailors ===
- Quarter Master
- Radar Plotter
- Survey Recorder
- Gunnery Rate
- Under Water Weaponriter
- Diver
- Patrolman
- Physical Training Instructor
- Engineering Mechanic
- Tradesman
- Civil Engineering
- Hull Engineering
- Transport Assistant
- Electrician Mate
- Radio Electrician Mate
- Steward
- Chef
- Information Technology
- Writer
- Stores Assistant
- Communicator
- Medical Assistant
- Musician

== History ==
Rank group	General / flag officers		Senior officers			Junior officers
Sri Lanka Navy (1988)
Sri Lanka Navy (1988)	Rear admiral	Commodore	Captain	Commander	Lieutenant commander	Lieutenant	Sub-lieutenant

Rank group	Senior NCOs				Junior NCOs		Enlisted
Sri Lanka Navy (1988)						No insignia	No insignia
Sri Lanka Navy (1988)	Master chief petty officer	Fleet chief petty officer	Chief petty officer	Petty officer	Leading seaman	Able seaman	Seaman recruit

== See also ==
- Sri Lanka Army ranks and insignia
- Sri Lanka Air Force ranks and insignia
- Sri Lanka Coast Guard#Rank structure
