= Uniforms of the Sri Lanka Army =

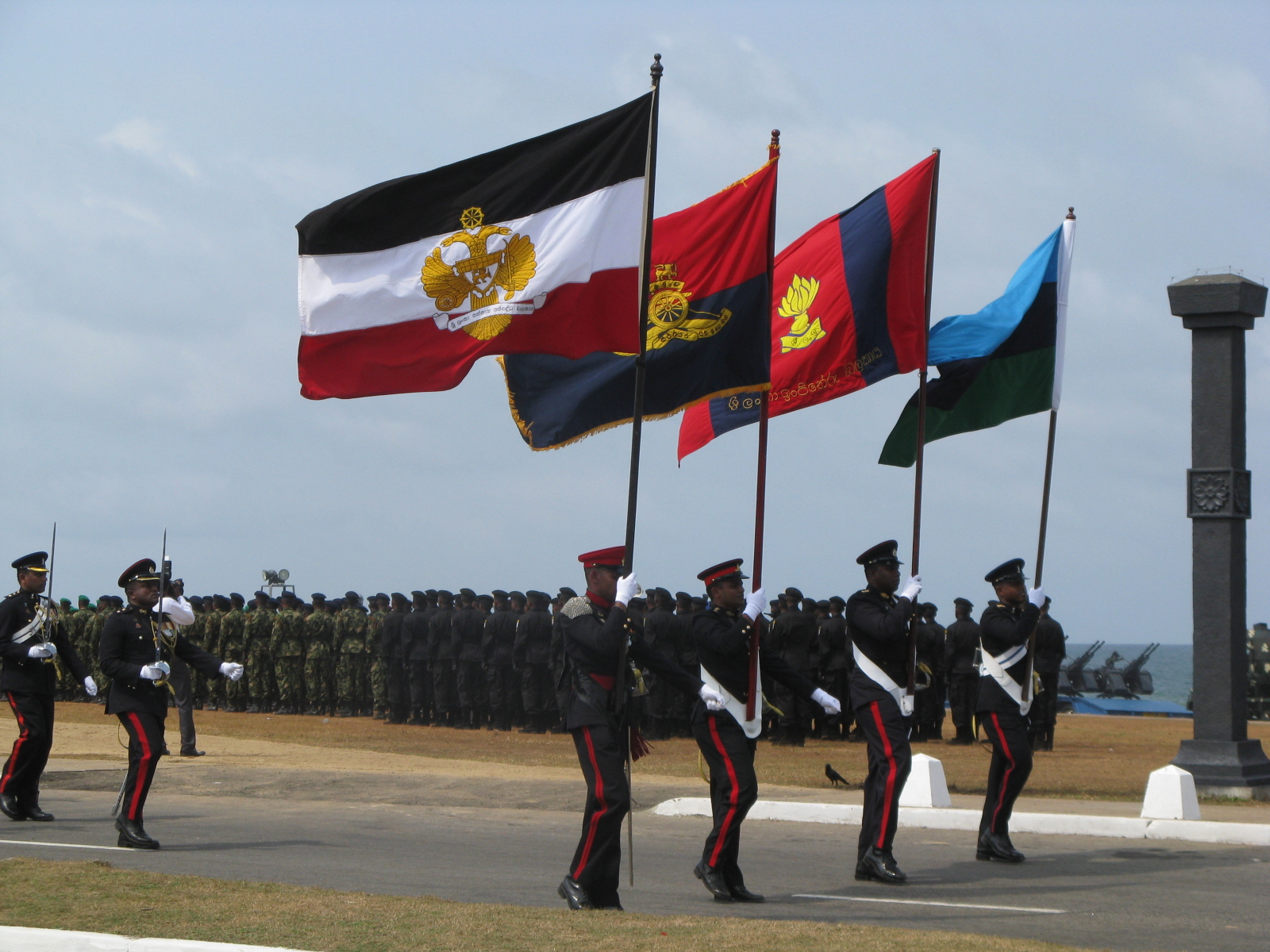
Ceremonial army uniforms on prarade.

The uniforms of the Sri Lanka Army currently exist in several categories ranging from ceremonial uniforms to combat dress (with full dress uniform).

== General principles ==
Uniforms in the Sri Lanka Army originated from those of the British Army and the Ceylon Defence Force, which was instrumental in its formation and today share many similarities with the uniforms of the British and Commonwealth armies. Based on British Army traditions uniforms are differentiated according to the regiment (or corps) to which an officer or soldier belongs. There are several significant uniform differences between infantry and cavalry regiments; furthermore, several features of cavalry uniform were (and are) extended to those corps and regiments deemed for historical reasons to have 'mounted status' in the British Army.

Full dress is the oldest form of uniform and presents the most differentiation between units; although there is then a 'steady thinning out of regimental features', through ceremonial dress, service dress, barrack dress and combat dress, a level of regimental distinction runs throughout. Unlike in the British Army where senior officers, of full colonel rank and above, do not wear regimental uniform (except when serving in the honorary position of a Colonel of the Regiment) and use 'staff uniform'; senior officers of the Sri Lankan Army retain regimental features while incorporating elements of the British staff uniform (which includes a coloured cap band and matching gorget patches in several orders of dress) with a few local variations. These include gorget patches with stars denoting rank in some uniforms, the use of the Kastane by general officers and President's ADCs and batons.

== Current ==
=== Official numbering ===
The Sri Lanka Army currently numbers the various uniforms which may be worn. The following table summarises the numbering:

- No 1 - Ceremonial Blues/Greens
- No 1A - Ceremonial Scarlet (Ceremonial guards of the Sri Lanka Corps of Military Police)
- No 2 - Mess Dress
- No 2A - Mess Dress (Alternative)
- No 3 - Service Dress
- No 3A - Service Dress (Winter) (for Colonel and above Officers and Aid de Camps)
- No 4 - Review Order
- No 4A - Winter Dress (for Lieutenant Colonel and below Officers)
- No 5 - Non Ceremonial Tunic with Ribbons and Peak
- No 5A - Non Ceremonial Tunic with Ribbons and Beret
- No 5B - Non Ceremonial Tunic with Ribbons (Alternative) (Female Medical Officers)
- No 6 - General Purpose Working Dress
- No 6A - General Purpose Working Dress (Alternative)
- No 6B - General Purpose Working Dress (Lady Officers)
- No 7 - Camouflage Uniform
- No 8 - Olive Green/Black Combat Dress
- No 9 - Maternity Dress
- No 10 - General Purpose Working Dress (Female Medical Officers)
- No 11 - Physical Training Dress
- No 11A - Physical Training Shoot to Kill Dress
- No 12 - Band Dress

=== Ceremonial Blue/Green ===
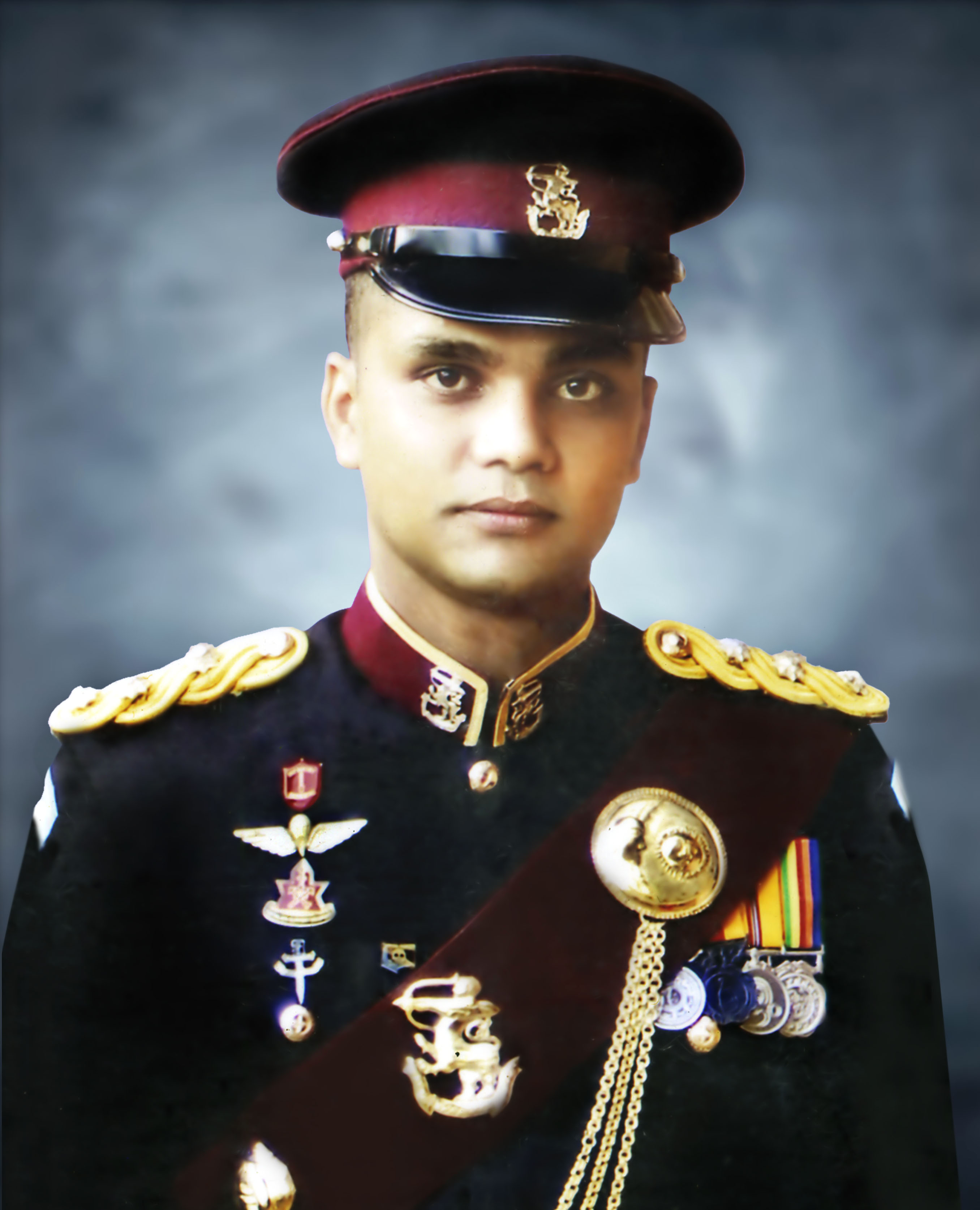
An officer in ceremonial dress uniform.

The Ceremonial uniform (No. 1), sometimes referred to as "blues", is a universal ceremonial uniform which is almost consistent throughout the Sri Lankan Army. No. 1 Dress is only worn on ceremonial occasions, service weddings by only officers, the Regimental Sergeant Major Army Headquarters, Academy Sergeant Major of Sri Lanka Military Academy, Regimental Sergeant Majors of Regimental Headquarters, Colour Units, and members of Artillery Saluting Battery. It is identical to the blue patrol uniform of the British Army and was formally designated as No. 2 Dress uniform. In the late 1990s it formally made the No. 1 Dress uniform having been the de facto Dress uniform for many years. Therefore, some regiments still refer to it as No. 2 uniform. In rifle regiments the uniform is in dark green. Medals are worn and swords carried if ordered. No 1 is dressed for corpses of officers.

The No. 1A scarlet uniform is worn by both male and female other ranks of the Sri Lanka Corps of Military Police on ceremonial duty and vigil duties, with the No.1A Presidential Scarlet won mounting guard for the President as part of the President’s Ceremonial Guard. It is similar in nature to the full dress uniforms worn by the British Army and the Indian Army.

The ceremonial uniform of the Serjeant-at-arms of the Sri Lankan Parliament would be similar to a No. 1 Blue Dress uniform of a major general with varied gorget patchs and epaulette similar to a flag officer of the Sri Lanka Navy.

=== Mess Dress ===
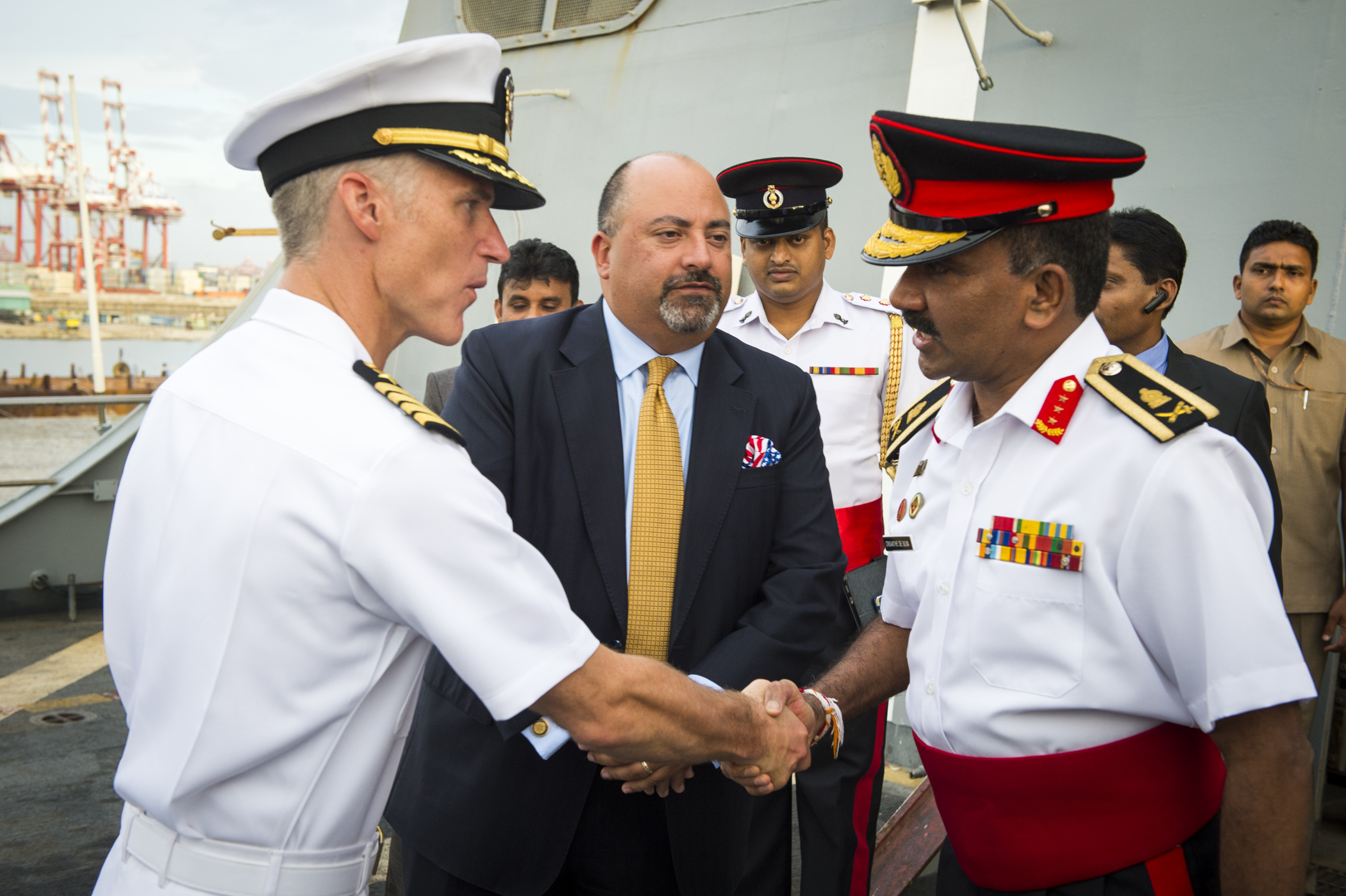
General Crishanthe (right) in Dress No. 2A (without jacket) uniform.

The mess dress uniform, includes a waist-length short jacket, with which men wear trousers, overalls or a kilt; and for women a long skirt. Known as No. 2 and No. 2A (without jacket), generally white jacket used by junior officers and warrant officers and a jacket of the regimental color worn by senior officers frequently includes elaborate braiding on the waistcoats. Female NCOs would wear sarees of a designated design.

=== Service Dress ===
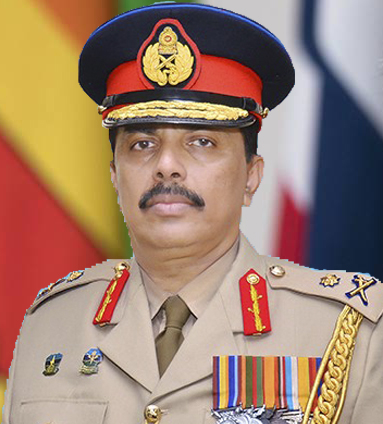
A Major General in service dress uniform.

The Service Dress uniform, is worn by senior officers of and above the rank of Colonel and their ADCs for less formal occasions and its alternative in winter. Formally approved for wear by all officers, it was rarely worn by most junior officers other than when serving as ADCs. It is based on the warm weather service dress uniform of the British Army. Medals are worn and swords carried if ordered. Traditionally known as the No. 4A it as now been adopted as the No. 2 and No. 3 by certain regiments.

=== Review Order ===
The Review Order uniform is worn by officers and other ranks on ceremonial parades, guards of honour, courts martial or whenever ordered. It is won for state and service funerals. Its alternative No 4A is won as a winter uniform by officers below the rank of Colonel and other ranks. No 4 is worn by other ranks for weddings and is dressed for corpses of other ranks.

=== General Purpose Working Dress ===
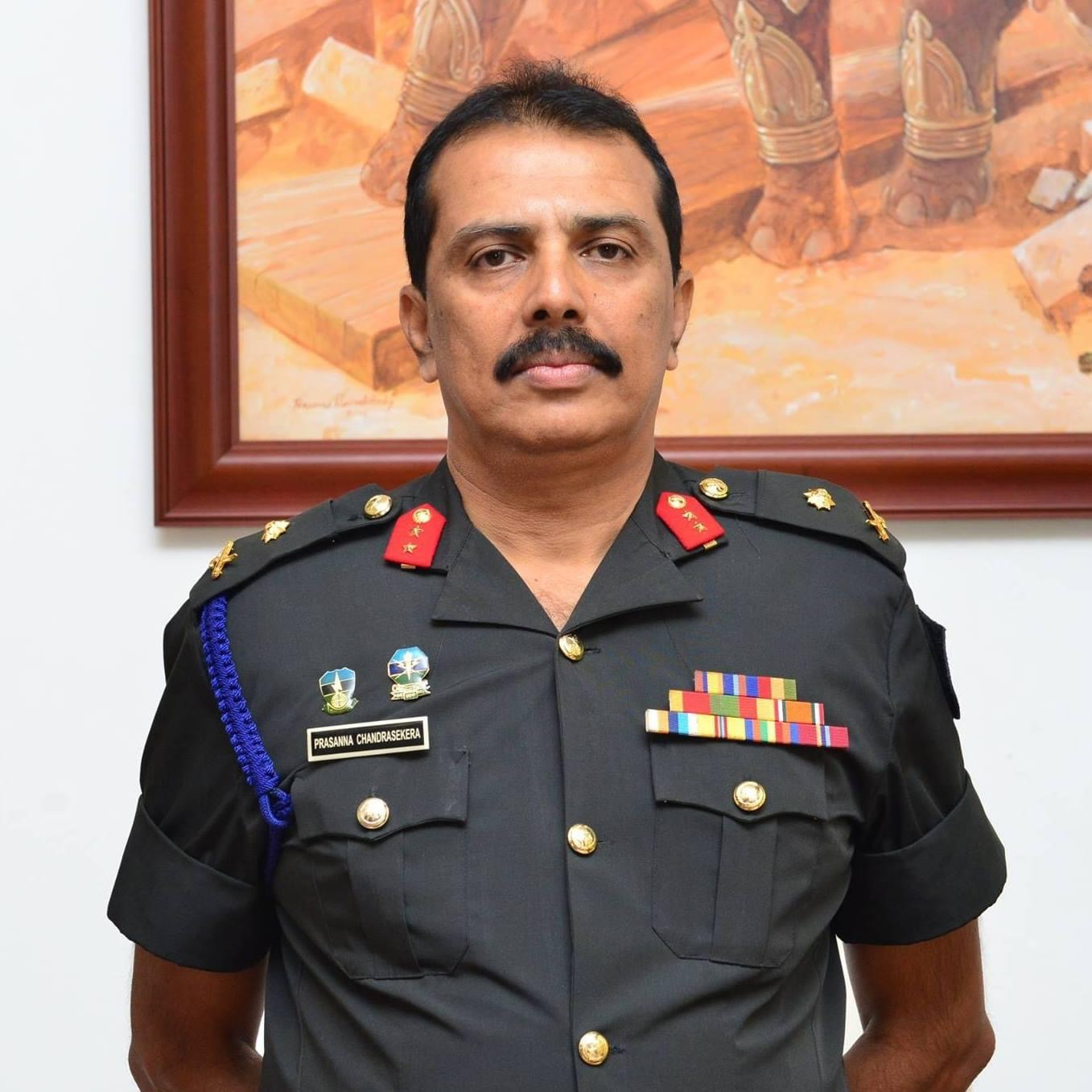
A Major General in Non Ceremonial Tunic No. 5.

The General Purpose Working Dress is worn by officers and other ranks on regimental duties, non-ceremonial parades, for office work, for field work and ordered.

=== Camouflage uniform ===
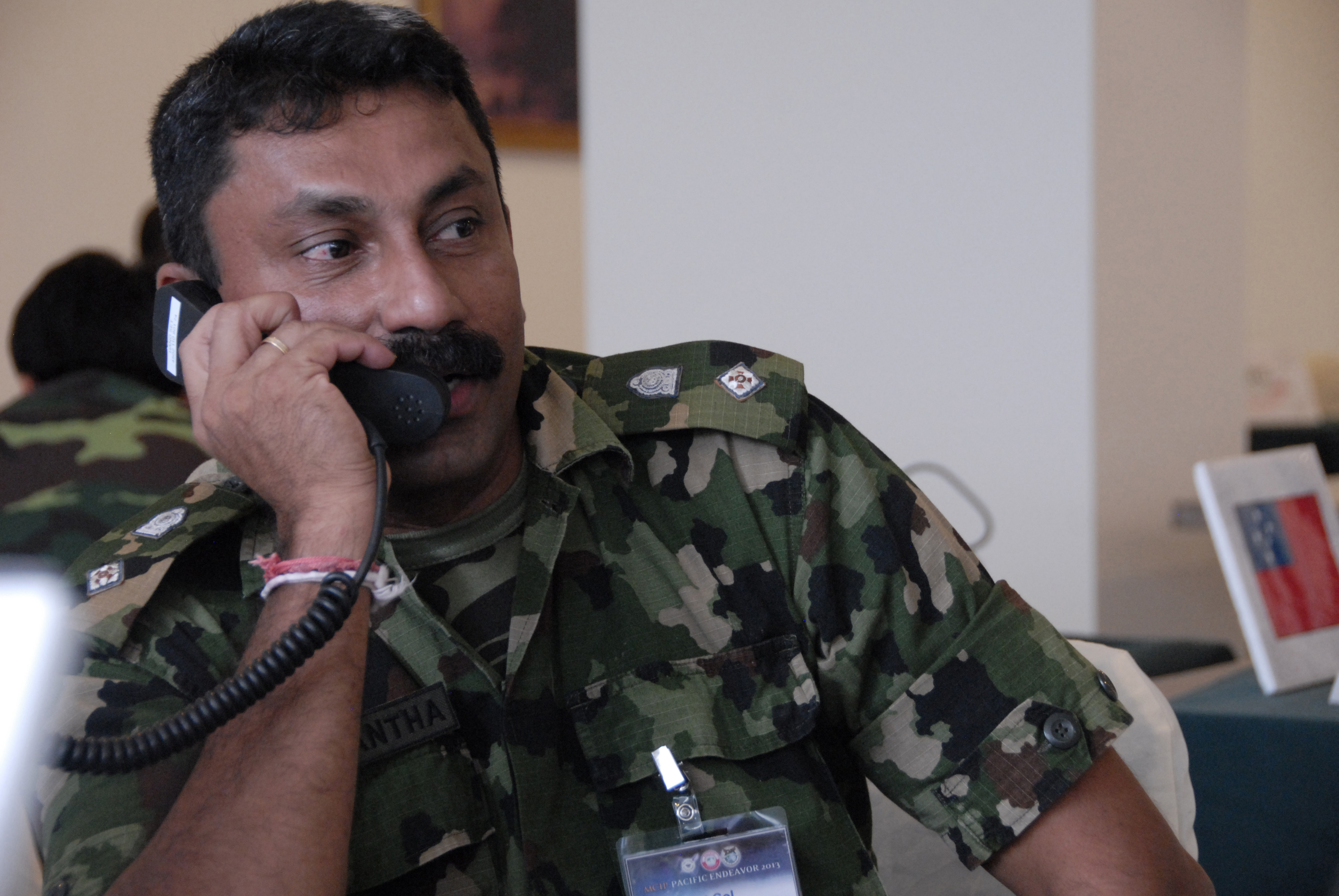
Army officer in camofluge uniform.

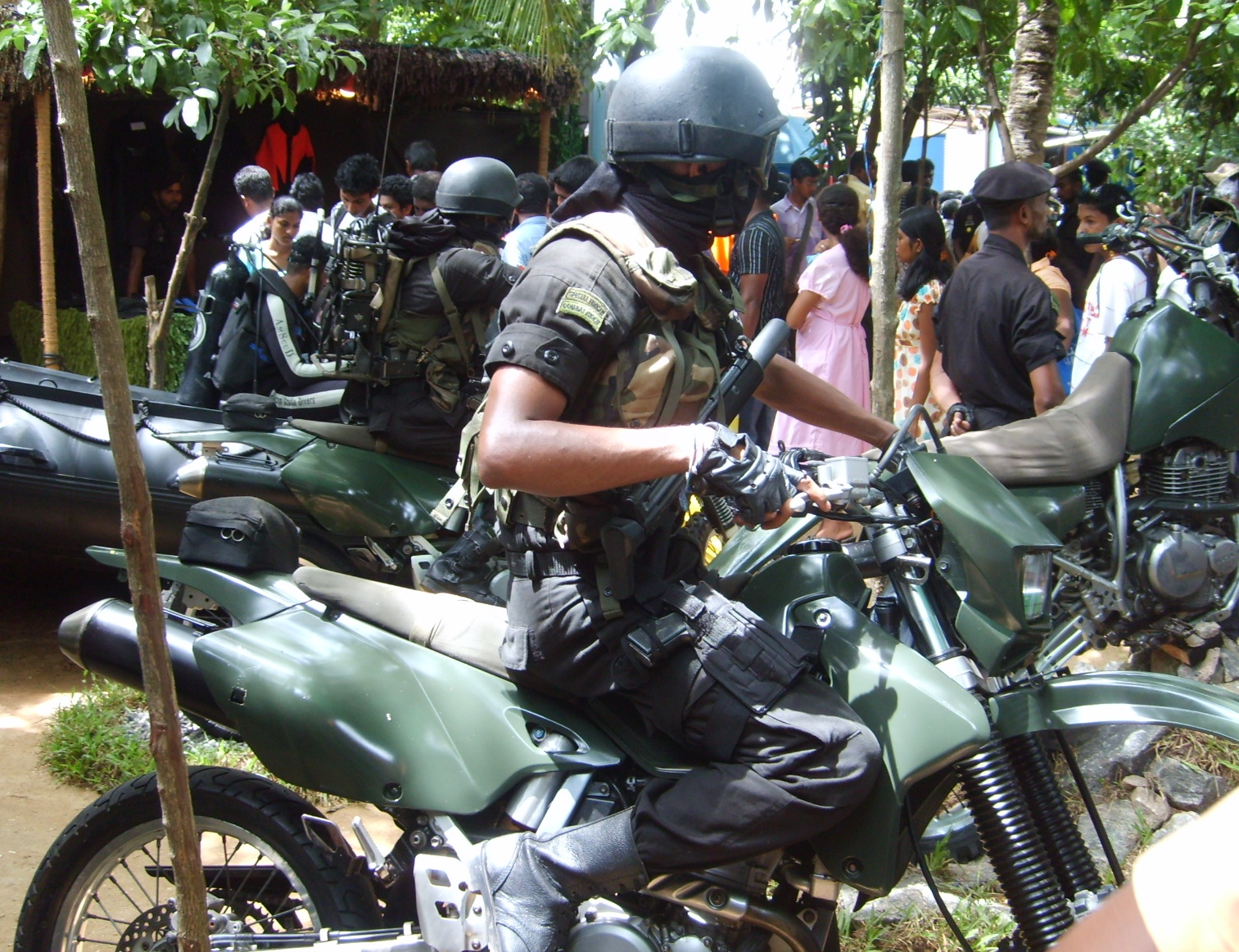
Combat rider in Olive Green/Black Combat Dress.

Camofluge uniform also known as no. 7 dress. Since 1990's the U.S. Woodland camofluge pattern has been used first by the Commando Regiment and thereafter by other regiment of the army, becoming the standard pattern of the army from 2010. All ranks of the army can wear this uniform when attending field training and field exercises. In September 2020, the army introduced a new four-coloured digital camouflage uniform to Commando and Special Forces personal.

=== Cadet uniforms ===
Cadets attached to the Sri Lanka Military Academy have uniforms that are similar to the standard uniforms.

- No 1 - Ceremonial
- No 2 - Mess Dress
- No 4 - Review Order
- No 6 - General Purpose Working Dress
- No 7 - Camouflage Uniform
- No 8 - Olive Green Combat Dress
- No 8A - Olive Green Combat Dress
- No 11 - Physical Training Dress
- No 12 - Physical Training Dress

== Obsolete ==
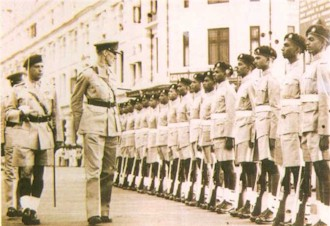
Khaki drill uniforms including shorts in 1949.

=== No. 1 Ceremonial White ===
The No. 1 Ceremonial White dress uniform, was the most formal uniform in Sri Lankan Army. No. 1 was a full white uniform while No. 1A was a white tunic and dark blue trousers similar to the British Army Warm weather ceremonial uniform. No. 1 was reserved to be used by Army officers appointed and serving as Aide-de-camp (ADC) to the President of Sri Lanka at ceremonies. A tradition that dates back to the time when army officers were appointed as Aide-de-camp to the Governor of Ceylon. No. 1A was used during day. It was worn by the Commandant of the Sri Lanka Military Academy at passing out parades in the 1980s and 1990s. The uniform has since been discontinued and army officers assigned as ADC to the President wear the ceremonial blue uniform for all formal functions while the Service Dress uniform is used by other officers for day time functions.

=== No.2: Service dress ===
The No. 2 Service dress, similar to the British Army Service Dress was used by the Ceylon Army till the 1970s. The current No. 3 Service Dress worn by offices of and above the rank of Colonel and their ADCs is of a similar design in a lighter shade of Khaki.

=== Khaki drill uniform ===
British Army style Khaki drill uniforms were used by the Ceylon Army from its formation into the 1970s. Khaki has since been replaced with olive green, with the exception of peaked caps that remain khaki in most regiments. These included shorts.

== See also ==
- Uniforms of the British Army
