= Sri Lanka Air Force ranks and insignia =

The ranks and insignia of the Sri Lanka Air Force are the military insignia used by the Sri Lanka Air Force. Upon the formation of the Sri Lanka Air Force in 1951, rank titles and badges for ORs were adopted from the Royal Air Force officer ranks and other ranks. Sri Lanka does have an Air Chief Marshal rank, but it is only awarded to the Commander of the Sri Lanka Air Force on the day of his retirement; Air Chief Marshal Roshan Goonetileke was the only Sri Lankan Air Force officer to hold the air chief marshal rank while in active service.

== Commissioned officer ranks ==
The rank insignia of commissioned officers.

Rank group	General/Flag/Air officers					Senior officers			Junior officers
Sri Lanka Air Force
Sri Lanka Air Force	Marshal of the Air Force	Air chief marshal	Air marshal	Air vice-marshal	Air commodore	Group captain	Wing commander	Squadron leader	Flight lieutenant	Flying officer	Pilot officer

== Other ranks ==
The rank insignia of non-commissioned officers and enlisted personnel.

Rank group	Senior NCOs				Junior NCOs	Enlisted
Sri Lanka Air Force							No insignia
Sri Lanka Air Force	Master warrant officer	Warrant officer	Flight sergeant	Sergeant	Corporal	Leading aircraftman	Aircraftman

== History ==
Rank group	General / flag officers		Senior officers			Junior officers
Sri Lanka Air Force (1988)
Sri Lanka Air Force (1988)	Air vice-marshal	Air commodore	Group captain	Wing commander	Squadron leader	Flight lieutenant	Flying officer	Pilot officer

Rank group	Senior NCOs			Junior NCOs	Enlisted
Sri Lanka Air Force (1988)						No insignia
Sri Lanka Air Force (1988)	Warrant officer	Flight sergeant	Sergeant	Corporal	Leading aircraftman	Aircraftman

== See also ==
- Sri Lanka Armed Forces
- Sri Lanka Army ranks and insignia
- Sri Lanka Navy ranks and insignia
