= Deputy Chief of Staff of the Sri Lanka Navy =

Deputy Chief of Staff of the Navy
- Incumbent; Rear Admiral BAKSP Banagoda
- Sri Lanka Navy
- Type: Senior navy post
- Abbreviation: DCOS
- Reports to: Commander of the Navy
- Residence: Colombo
- Seat: Navy HQ
- Nominator: President of Sri Lanka
- Appointer: President of Sri Lanka
- Term length: Not fixed

Deputy Chief of Staff of the Navy (DoSA) has been the title of the third in command of the Sri Lanka Navy. The post is held by a regular officer of the rank of Rear Admiral and is the third senior position in the Navy. Deputy Chief of Staff is charged with assisting the Chief of Staff of the Navy in both operational and administrative aspects, functioning as the Acting Navy Commander in his absences or incantation.

== List of deputy chiefs of staff ==
No	Chief of staff	Took office	Left office	Notes
	Rear Admiral S.P. Weerasekara	7 July 2005	13 December 2005	
	Rear Admiral T.M.W.K.B. Tennakoon	1 January 2007	20 May 2007	
	Rear Admiral M.R.U. Sirirwardena	1 August 2007	6 June 2008	
	Rear Admiral T.S.G. Samarasinghe	7 June 2008	15 May 2009	
	Rear Admiral Susith Weerasekara	16 May 2009	4 April 2011	
	Rear Admiral Neil Rosayro	11 July 2015	25 October 2017	
	Rear Admiral Piyal De Silva	26 October 2017	1 July 2018	
	Rear Admiral Jagath Ranasinghe	12 November 2018	31 December 2018	
	Rear Admiral Nishantha Ulugetenne		4 May 2019	
	Rear Admiral Niraj Attygalle		7 November 2019	
	Rear Admiral Kapila Samaraweera	8 November 2019	12 September 2020	
	Rear Admiral Sumith Weerasinghe	22 September 2020	14 January 2021	
	Rear Admiral Ruwan Perera	15 January 2021	20 March 2021	
	Rear Admiral Meril Sudarshana	21 March 2021	19 May 2021	
	Rear Admiral Y. N. Jayarathna	19 May 2021	16 August 2021	
	Rear Admiral Upul De Silva	7 September 2021	20 June 2022	
	Rear Admiral Priyantha Perera	21 June 2022	8 July 2022	
	Rear Admiral Anura Ekanayake	9 July 2022	12 October 2022	Appointed as Deputy Chief of Staff while he is holding office as the 6th Director General of the Sri Lanka Coast Guard.
	Rear Admiral Jayantha Kularatne	12 October 2022	22 December 2022	
	Rear Admiral Nishantha De Silva		23 December 2022	
	Rear Admiral Pradeep Rathnayake	23 December 2022	16 January 2024	
	Rear Admiral KWARI Ranasinghe	4 April 2024	11 October 2024	
	Rear Admiral Nishantha Peiris	11 October 2024	5 November 2024	
	Rear Admiral Rohitha Abeysinghe	5 November 2024	9 November 2024	
	Rear Admiral KDDC Fernando	9 November 2024	30 December 2024	
	Rear Admiral W.D.C.U. Kumarasinghe	31 December 2024	30 May 2025	
