= Piyal De Silva =

Sri Lankan admiral

Admiral Piyal De Silva
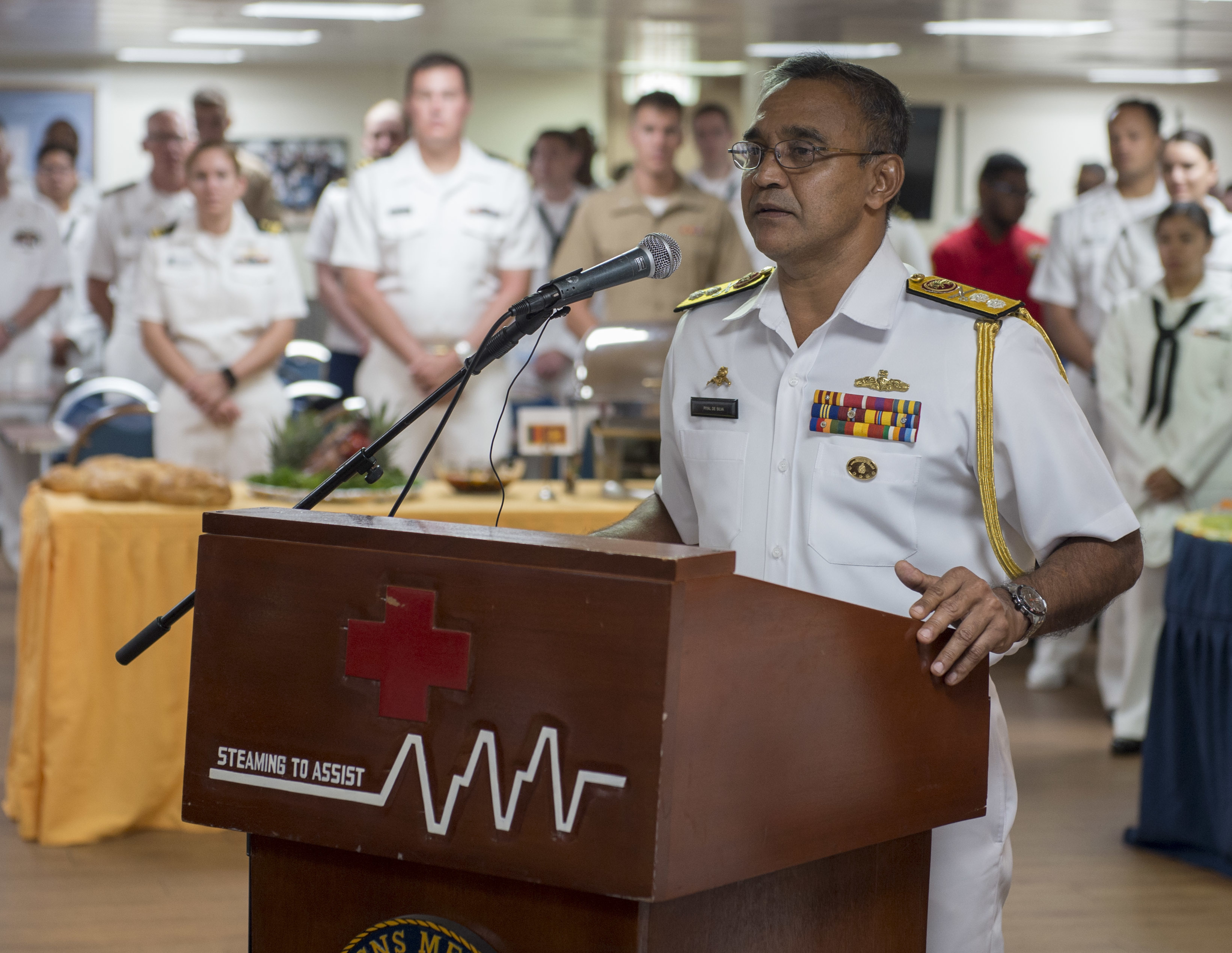
- Education: Dharmashoka College, Ambalangoda
- Military career
- Allegiance: Sri Lanka
- Branch: Sri Lanka Navy
- Rank: Admiral
- Units: Executive branch, Diver, Special Boat Squadron
- Commands: Commander of the Sri Lanka Navy; Chief of Staff of the Sri Lanka Navy; Deputy Chief of Staff; Flag Officer Commanding Naval Fleet
- Conflicts: Sri Lankan Civil War
- Awards: Weera Wickrama Vibhushanaya & Bar; Rana Wickrama Padakkama; Rana Sura Padakkama; Vishista Seva Vibhushanaya; Uttama Seva Padakkama
- Other work: Deputy Chairman of Ceyline Holdings

Admiral Piyal De Silva, WWV & Bar, RWP, RSP, VSV, USP is a former senior Sri Lankan naval officer. He was the Commander of the Sri Lankan Navy from 2019 to 2020.

== Education ==
Educated at Dharmasoka College, in Ambalangoda he joined the navy in 1984.

== Naval career ==
De Silva joined the Sri Lanka Navy as an Officer Cadet in the 12th intake in 1984 undergoing basic training at the Naval and Maritime Academy. On completion of his basic training at the Naval and Maritime Academy, he was commissioned as a Sub Lieutenant in February 1986. During his early career he specialized as an explosive ordnance disposal diver going on to command the elite Special Boat Squadron and the Diving Unit of the Navy. An officer of the executive branch he held sea commands as Captain of several warships. He later gained a Master of Business Administration in Human Resource Management, a Master of Defence and Strategic Studies and graduated from the PLA National Defence University.

He was promoted to the rank of Rear Admiral in 2012 and held appointments such as Flag Officer Commanding Naval Fleet, Commander Eastern, Southern, North-western and Northern Naval areas.

President Maithripala Sirisena appointed De Silva the Chief of Staff of the Sri Lanka Navy with effect from 2 July 2018. Prior to this appointment, he served as the Deputy Chief of Staff and Director General Operations. On 31 December 2018, he was appointed by President Sirisena as Commander of the Navy and promoted to the rank of Vice Admiral effective from 1 January 2019. He retired from the navy on 14 July 2020 and was promoted to the rank of Admiral.

His decorations include Weera Wickrama Vibhushanaya awarded two times, Rana Wickrama Padakkama, Rana Sura Padakkama for gallantry; Vishista Seva Vibhushanaya and Uttama Seva Padakkama for meritorious service.

== Honors ==
His decorations include Weera Wickrama Vibhushanaya twice (with a Bar), Rana Wickrama Padakkama, Rana Sura Padakkama for gallantry; Vishista Seva Vibhushanaya and Uttama Seva Padakkama for meritorious service. Other medals he has gained over the years include, the Sri Lanka Armed Services Long Service Medal (with clasp), the Sri Lanka Navy 50th Anniversary Medal, the 50th Independence Anniversary Commemoration Medal, the Eastern Humanitarian Operations Medal (with clasp), the Northern Humanitarian Operations Medal (with clasp), the North and East Operations Medal, the Purna Bhumi Padakkama, and the Riviresa Campaign Services Medal.

His badges include: the Surface Warfare Badge, Diving Badge, and the Commendation Badge.

== Sporting career ==
De Silva was adjudged the Best Sportsman of the Sri Lanka Navy on two occasions and represented the Sri Lankan national basketball team at South Asian and Asian Basketball Tournaments.

== Family ==
De Silva is married to Arundathi Jayaneththi and they have two sons.

Military offices
Preceded by Sirimevan Ranasinghe	Commander of the Sri Lankan Navy; January 2019 - July 2020	Succeeded by Nishantha Ulugetenne
Preceded by Neil Rosayro	Chief of Staff of the Sri Lankan Navy; July 2018 - December 2018	Succeeded by Jagath Ranasinghe
