= Jayantha Perera =

Sri Lankan admiral

Admiral Jayantha Perera
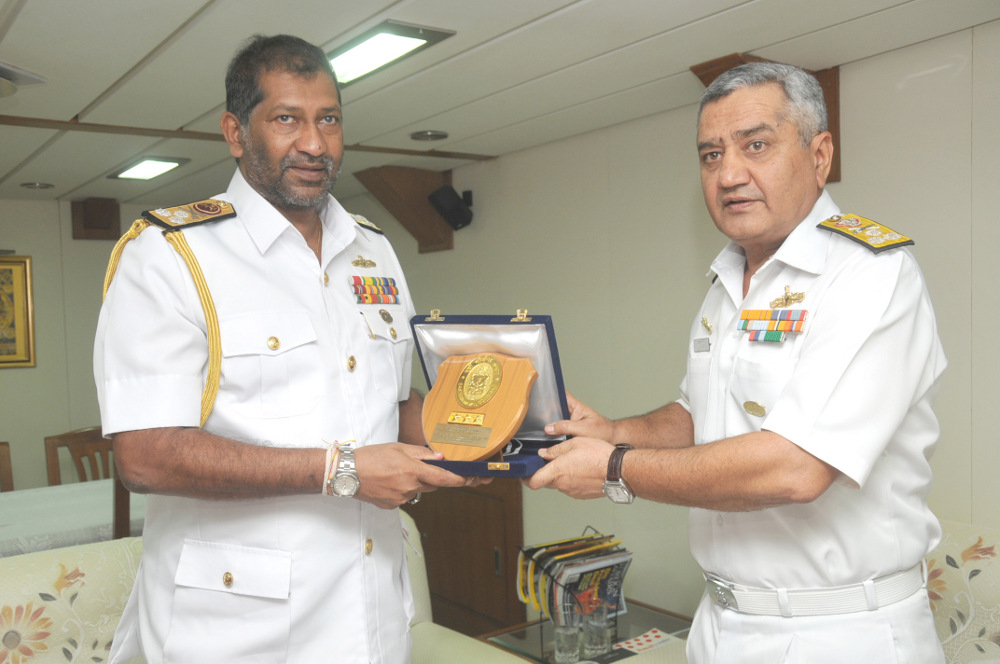
- Perera (left)
- Born: July 11, 1957 (age 69)
- Military career
- Allegiance: Sri Lanka
- Branch: Sri Lanka Navy
- Service years: 1978 - 2015
- Rank: Admiral
- Service number: NRX 0140
- Commands: Commander of the Sri Lanka Navy; Chief of Staff; Western Naval Command; Southern Naval Command
- Awards: Rana Wickrama Padakkama; Vishista Seva Vibhushanaya; Uttama Seva Padakkama
- Other work: Presidential Advisor on Maritime Affairs

Admiral (retired) Jayantha Perera RWP, VSV, USP, ndu, psc was the 19th Commander of the Sri Lankan Navy.

== Education and career ==
Educated at Thurstan College, Colombo, Perera enlisted in the Sri Lanka Navy on 23 August 1978. Completing basic training at the Naval and Maritime Academy in Trincomalee in 1979, he went on to specialize in gunnery at INS Dronacharya in Kochi, India. In 1996, he completed an MSc in Defense Studies at the University of Madras, and would earn another MSc in Defense & Strategic Studies at the National Defence University in Islamabad.

Perera commanded the SLN flagship SLNS Sayura in the 2000-2003 period and was the Flag officer commanding the naval fleet from 2006 to 2007 based at Trincomalee, simultaneously serving as Deputy Area Commander for the Eastern Command. Other staff appointments he has held at various times include:

- Director Naval Operations and Naval Special Forces
- Director Naval Weapons
- Deputy Director of Naval Intelligence
- Deputy Director of Naval Training
- Media Spokesman for the SLN
- Principal Staff Officer to the Chief of Defence Staff

He has held, in order, the SLN's Southern and Western Commands in the 2007-2009 period, and following a brief three-month stint as the navy's Director General- Services, was appointed Director General- Operations- a position he occupied until July 2013, when he was appointed Chief of Staff of the SLN. He was awarded the Rana Wickrama Padakkama the same year

He was appointed Commander of the Navy on 1 July 2014, and was promoted to the rank of admiral on his retirement from duty on 9 July 2015.

Military offices
Preceded by Jayanath Colombage	Commander of the Sri Lankan Navy; July 2014 - July 2015	Succeeded by Ravindra Wijegunaratne
Preceded by Jayanath Colombage	Chief of Staff of the Sri Lankan Navy; July 2013 - July 2014	Succeeded by Ravindra Wijegunaratne
