= Sirimevan Ranasinghe =

Sri Lankan admiral

Admiral Sirimevan Ranasinghe
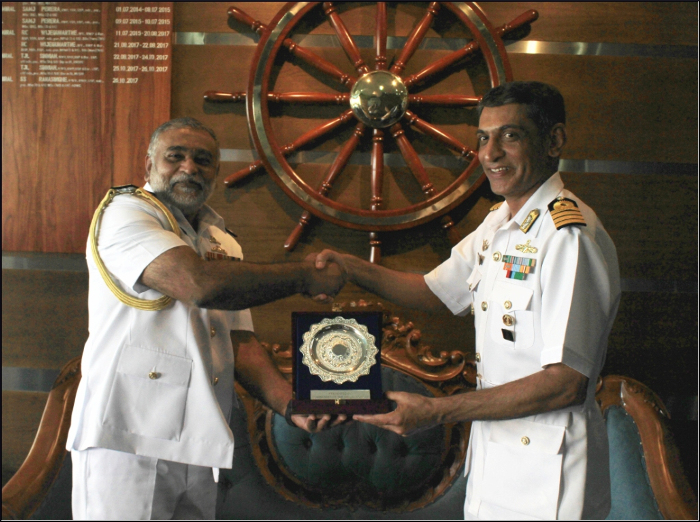
- Ranasinghe, left
- Alma mater: St. Joseph's College, Anuradhapura Anuradhapura Central College
- Military career
- Allegiance: Sri Lanka
- Branch: Sri Lanka Navy
- Rank: Admiral
- Commands: Commander of the Sri Lanka Navy; Chief of Staff; Director General Coast Guard
- Awards: Weera Wickrama Vibhushanaya; Rana Wickrama Padakkama; Uttama Seva Padakkama

Admiral Sirimevan Sarathchandra Ranasinghe, WWV, RWP, USP is a retired Sri Lankan admiral and the former Commander of the Sri Lanka Navy.

== Early life and education ==
Ranasinghe received his education from St. Joseph's College, Anuradhapura and the Anuradhapura Central College. He holds an MPhil in Defence and Strategic Studies from the University of Madras and a Msc in War Studies and Defence Management from the National Defence University, Pakistan.

== Naval career ==
He enlisted in the Sri Lanka Navy as an Officer Cadet in its 11th Intake on 15 November 1982, undergoing basic training at the Naval and Maritime Academy, Trincomalee, where he was adjudged the best cadet and selected for an international midshipmen course at the Britannia Royal Naval College, Dartmouth, which he attended between 1984 and 1985. He is an anti submarine warfare specialist (having trained at INS Venduruthy), and did his Naval Staff Course in 1999 at the Defence Services Staff College in Wellington, India. Ranasinghe has held the command of various ships and craft during his career in the navy, including SLNS Samudura (Commissioning Commanding Officer of US Coast Guard Cutter received from the United States of America), and the Fast Attack Squadron between 2002 and 2004. He attended the Allied Officers' War Course at the National Defence University in Islamabad in 2007, and a National Defence Course in 2012 at the National Defence College, New Delhi.

President Maithripala Sirisena appointed Ranasinghe the Chief of Staff of the Sri Lanka Navy with effect from 11 July 2015. Prior to this appointment, he served as the 4th Director General of the Sri Lanka Coast Guard (appointed in August 2016). Other commands he has held include the Western Naval Command (2013–2014), Southern Naval Command (2012) and Deputy to the Southern Naval Command (2008). Staff commands he has held include those as Commandant of the Naval and Maritime Academy, Director Naval Operations, Director Naval Weapons, Director Marine Special Forces and Director Naval Projects and Plans.

Ranasinghe was appointed Commander of the Navy effective 26 October 2017, replacing Travis Sinniah. He was promoted to the rank of admiral on 31 December 2018 and retired on 1 January 2019.

Ranasinghe was appointed Chairman of Sri Lanka Ports Authority on 3 October 2024 by President Anura Kumara Dissanayake.

== Personal life ==
Sirimevan is a keen sportsman, and has received Britannia Royal Naval College Colours for Badminton, and a Triple Crown in Badminton in the Inter-command Navy Tournament 1997.

Military offices
| Preceded by Travis Sinniah | Commander of the Sri Lankan Navy; October 2017- December 2018 | Succeeded by Piyal De Silva |
| Preceded by Ravindra Wijegunaratne | Chief of Staff of the Sri Lankan Navy; July 2015 – October 2017 | Succeeded by Neil Rosayro |
