= Weerodara Vibhushanaya =

- Medal, obverse (right), reverse (left)
- Type: Military
- Awarded for: Individual acts of exceptional gallantry and bravery of a non military nature, performed on a serviceperson's own initiative without any regard for their own life or well-being
- Description: Suspended from a plain suspension bar
- Presented by: Sri Lanka
- Eligibility: All ranks of the tri services (regular/volunteer)
- Post-nominals: WV
- Clasps: None
- Status: Currently awarded
- Established: 1981
- First award: 1989
- Ribbon bar

Precedence
- Next (higher): Parama Weera Vibhushanaya
- Next (lower): Weera Wickrama Vibhushanaya

The Weerodara Vibhushanaya (WV, English:Order of Courage) (Sinhala: වීරෝධාර වීභූෂණය vīrōdāra vibhūṣanaya) is the second-highest decoration awarded by the Military of Sri Lanka awarded for:

...individual acts of gallantry and conspicuous bravery of a non-military nature of the most exceptional order performed voluntarily with no regard to his own life and security with the objective of saving or safeguarding the life or lives of a person or personnel imperiled by death or for a meritorious act or a series of acts of a humane nature of an exceptional order displayed in saving life from drowning, fire and rescue operations in mines, floods and similar calamities under circumstances of grave bodily injury or great danger to the life of the rescuer...

—

The Weerodara Vibhushanaya is equivalent to the British George Cross and the Indian Ashoka Chakra Award, and is the highest peacetime military decoration awarded by Sri Lanka. The civilian equivalent is the Veera Chudamani. Weerodara Vibhushanaya translates as the "Order of Bravery".

== History ==
Both military and civilians were entitled to be granted British military decorations on the recommendation of the British Governor of Ceylon. In 1946, Botalage Edmund Perera was awarded the George Medal for rescuing four crewmen from a burning aircraft crash in Negombo. This practice was continued after Ceylon gained independence in 1948 and the formation of the Ceylon Army in 1949, the Royal Ceylon Navy in 1950, and the Royal Ceylon Air Force in 1951.

Following up on his election promise, S. W. R. D. Bandaranaike suspended imperial honours. This meant only service medals such as the Ceylon Armed Services Long Service Medal, the Efficiency Decoration (Ceylon) and the Efficiency Medal (Ceylon) were awarded after 1956. No gallantry medals were awarded even during the 1971 JVP Insurrection. In 1972, Ceylon became a republic as the Republic of Sri Lanka. On 1 September 1981, President J. R. Jayewardene instituted new Sri Lankan awards for gallantry the Parama Weera Vibhushanaya (PWV), Weerodara Vibhushanaya (WV), Weera Wickrama Vibhushanaya (WWV), Rana Wickrama Padakkama (RWV), and the Rana Sura Padakkama (RSP) by the Gazette Extraordinary No. 156/5 of 1982.

In 1989, Lance Corporal P. L. S. L. Cooray of the Sri Lanka Sinha Regiment became the first recipients of the Weerodara Vibhushanaya. Having sustained burn injuries himself, he saved the life of his wounded officer from drowning after the helicopter they had been carrying out an air reconnaissance patrol crashed landed Nawanthurai Lagoon, Jaffna following mechanical failure and started burning on 30 November 1989.

In 2022, the 2016 award of the Weerodara Vibhushanaya to Group Captain L. C. Dissanayake was canceled following an internal inquiry which had been described as "an administrative lapse".

== Award process and privileges ==
The medal is awarded to all ranks of the tri forces (both regular and volunteer service personnel) and civilians., following recommendation by service commanders. The degree of courage shown is taken into consideration during the review process. Unlike the George Cross and Ashoka Chakra Award, it does not provide for any annuity or monitory benefits for the recipient or next of kin other than statuary pension or WNOP pension.

The award is presented by the President, with recipients able to use the post-nominal letters "WV".

All original individual WV awards are published in the Government Gazette.

== List of recipients ==
Sri Lanka Army

- Captain (QM) P. L. S. L. Cooray - Sri Lanka Sinha Regiment - 1989
- Colonel C. D. Wickramanayake - Sri Lanka Engineers
- Corporal R. P. R. Wickramapala - Sri Lanka Sinha Regiment - 1998 - Colombo Central Bank bombing
- Corporal W. M. Karunaratne - Vijayabahu Infantry Regiment - 1998 - Colombo Central Bank bombing

Sri Lanka Navy

- Admiral D. W. A. S. Dissanayake
- Admiral Ravindra Wijegunaratne

Sri Lanka Air Force

- Leading Aircraftman H. P. T. N. Dissanayake - 10 October 1998
- Group Captain L. C. Dissanayake - 13 October 2016 (canceled on 16 June 2022)
- Warrant Officer Y. M. S. Yaparathne (Posthumously) - 19 October 2017
- Corporal D.A.W.M.N.D.B Rathnayake - 19 August 2019
- Wing Commander K. A. D. A. C. Kuruwita - 15 November 2019
- Wing commander D. L. Hewawitharana - 15 November 2019
- Wing commander S. R. Jayaratne - 15 November 2019
- Squadron Leader D. S. Samaraweera - 15 November 2019
- Squadron Leader D. M. A. D. B. Dambakotuwa - 15 November 2019

== See also ==
- Veera Chudamani
- Veera Prathapa
- George Cross
- George Medal
