= D. W. A. S. Dissanayake =

Admiral D. W. A. S. Dissanayake WV, RSP & Bar, VSV, USP
- Born: 27 April 1956 (age 70)
- Military career
- Allegiance: Sri Lanka
- Branch: Sri Lanka Navy
- Service years: 1977–2012
- Rank: Admiral
- Service number: NRX 0117
- Commands: Commander of the Sri Lankan Navy
- Awards: Weerodara Vibhushanaya; Rana Sura Padakkama

Admiral Dissanayake Wijesinghe Arachchilage Somatilake Dissanayake WV, RSP & Bar, VSV, USP is a retired Sri Lankan admiral. He served as Commander of the Sri Lankan Navy from January 2011 to September 2012.

Having studied at Mayurapada Central College, Narammala, he joined the Sri Lanka Navy as an officer cadet on 1 June 1977 and received his basic officer training at the Naval and Maritime Academy, Trincomalle. He thereafter attended the Sub Lieutenant Technical Course at INS Venduruthy, India and the International Warfare Course of the Royal Navy. Having spent most of his early career in the operational areas of the Northern and Eastern provinces, he led the attack that resulted in the first sinking of a LTTE craft in a sea battle north of Kankesanthurai in 1984, killing 19 LTTE cadres. Serving over eight years on sea duty, he has over 30 interceptions at sea to his credit while in command of Inshore Patrol Craft, Fast Attack Craft and Fast Gun Boats and has taken part in major joint military operations such as Vadamarachchi, Balawegaya and Riviresa. He served as the commanding officer of the Fast Attack Craft Squadron. He is a graduate of the National Defence College, New Delhi having gained a MPhil in Defence and Strategic Studies; he has gained a Masters in Management on Defence Studies from the General Sir John Kotelawala Defence University and graduated from the National Defense University. He has attended the Asia-Pacific Center for Security Studies and is a member of the Nautical Institute. From 1998 to 2001 he served as the Defence Adviser to the Sri Lankan High Commission in New Delhi, where he took part in the purchase of SLNS Sayura, a used navy vessel, from India and established close links between the naval headquarters of the two navies. He served as Director Naval Administration, Director Naval Personnel, Director Naval Welfare, Director General Operations, Director General Services, Commander Southern Naval Area. He was appointed Commander of the Sri Lankan Navy on 15 January 2011 and served until his retirement on 27 September 2012 on which date he was promoted to the rank of Admiral. He was succeeded by Jayanath Colombage.

Military offices
Preceded by Thisara Samarasinghe	Commander of the Sri Lankan Navy; 2011-2012	Succeeded by Jayanath Colombage
