= Ravindra Wijegunaratne =

Sri Lankan admiral

Admiral Ravindra Chandrasiri Wijegunaratne WV, RWP, RSP, VSV, USP
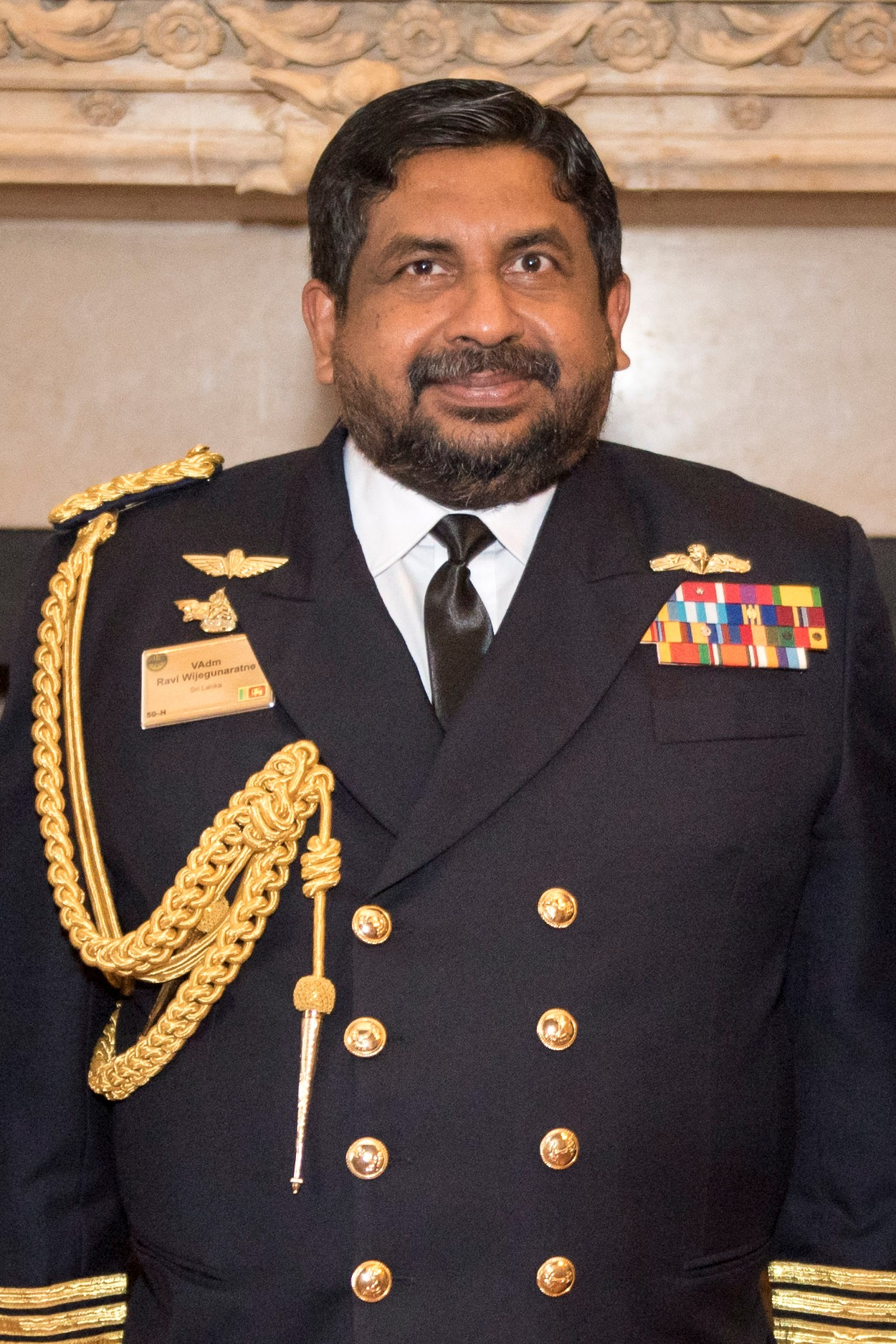
- Wijegunaratne in 2016
- Born: 22 February 1962 (age 64)
- Military career
- Allegiance: Sri Lanka
- Branch: Sri Lanka Navy
- Service years: 1980 – 2019
- Rank: Admiral
- Nickname: Ravi
- Service number: NRX0176
- Unit: Special Boat Squadron
- Commands: Chief of Defence Staff; Commander of the Sri Lanka Navy; Chief of Staff; Director General Coast Guard; Eastern Naval Command; Northern Naval Area; Western Naval Command; Southern Naval Command
- Conflicts: Sri Lankan Civil War
- Awards: Weerodara Vibhushanaya; Rana Wickrama Padakkama (x2); Rana Sura Padakkama; Vishista Seva Vibhushanaya; Uttama Seva Padakkama; Sri Lanka Armed Services Long Service Medal, Nishan-e-Imtiaz
- Other work: Sri Lankan High Commissioner to Pakistan

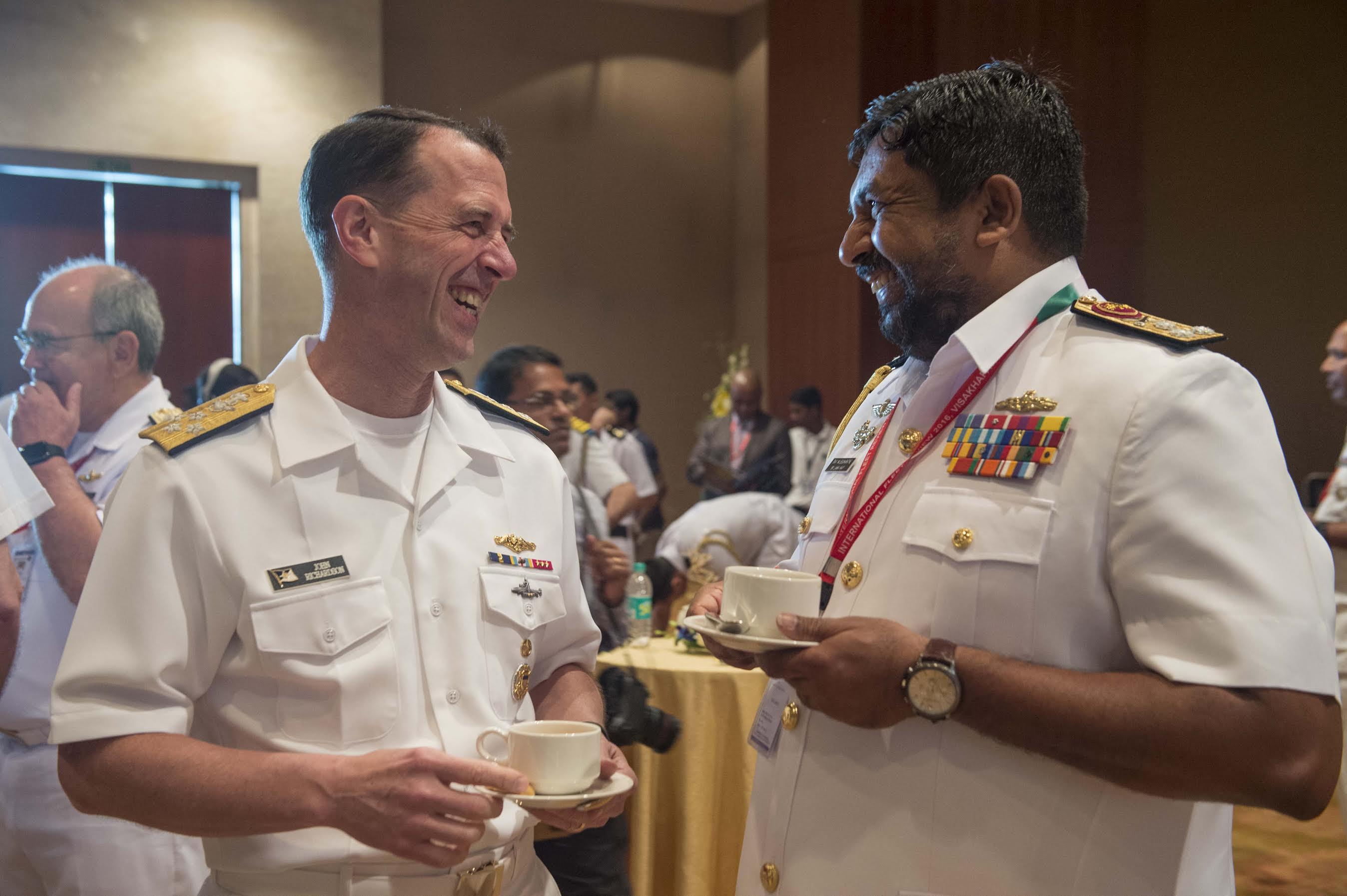
John Richardson and Ravindra Wijegunaratne

Admiral Ravindra Chandrasiri Wijegunaratne, WV, RWP and Bar, RSP, VSV, USP, NI(M), ndc, psn, is a retired Sri Lankan admiral, and former Chief of Defence Staff of the Sri Lanka Armed Forces. He has also served as the Commander of the Sri Lankan Navy, Chief of Staff of the Sri Lanka Navy, the Director General of the Sri Lanka Coast Guard and held, at various times, four of the seven Naval Commands of the SLN. Wijegunaratne has also served as Director Naval Operations, and is a recipient of the Weerodara Vibhushanaya.

== Education ==
Born in 1962, Wijegunaratne was educated at the Royal College, Colombo from 1969. At Royal College, he was a President's Scout, Lance sergeant of the Herman Loos Cadet Platoon and a School Prefect in addition to representing the school in both hockey and basketball, as well as being an All-Island Junior Athletics Champion. He was the fourth Royalist to be appointed Commander of the SLN.

Graduating in the same year, he enlisted in the Sri Lanka Navy on 1 November 1980 as an officer cadet as part of the 9th Intake at the Naval and Maritime Academy, Trincomalee. He completed officer training as a Midshipman at both Trincomalee and Dartmouth (where he was awarded 'Best International Midshipman, 1982') in 1982. He would go on to follow a Sub-lieutenant technical course and specialize in anti-submarine warfare in India, and followed a staff course at the Pakistan Navy War College. In 1996 he gained a BSc in War Studies from the University of Karachi, and later graduated from the National Defense University (NESA) and National Defence College, India (50th NDC Course - 2010). In 2010, he obtained an MPhil in Defence and Strategic Studies at the University of Madras. He is a member of the Nautical Institute.

== Naval career ==
Starting out as a Sub-lieutenant, Admiral Wijegunaratne gained early exposure to the Sri Lankan Civil War fighting alongside India's MARCOS in the Indian Peace Keeping Force's 1987 Operation Pawan. Having been promoted to the rank of Lieutenant Commander, he founded Sri Lanka's elite Special Boat Squadron (SBS) in 1993, building on the work done by Lieutenant commander Shanthi Bahar. Wijegunaratne led the SBS during the Battle of Pooneryn and held its command twice through his career, once in 1993-1994 and again in 1999-2000. As a result of his specialization and work in the SBS, he is regarded as an expert in asymmetric naval warfare and small-boat operations. Between June 2005 and March 2006, he served as Commanding Officer of the SLN's flagship at that time, SLNS Sayura. He was also instrumental in forming the Sri Lanka Navy Marines.

Promoted to the rank of Commodore, and then to Rear Admiral in 2009, Wijegunaratne has held several appointments and commands within the Sri Lanka Navy:

- Director Naval Operations
- Director Naval Weapon Systems
- Director Special Forces
- Director Maritime Surveillance
- Commandant of the Naval and Maritime Academy
- Flag officer Commanding Naval Fleet
- Director General Services
- Commander, Eastern Naval Command
- Commander, Northern Naval Command
- Commander, Western Naval Command
- Commander, Southern Naval Command

As Director Naval Operations in 2007, he oversaw the SLN's efforts to halt Sea Tiger arms smuggling, leading to the elimination of what are thought to be the LTTE's four final floating armouries.

He was appointed the Chief of Staff of the Sri Lanka Navy on 7 July 2014, and promoted to Vice Admiral and appointed Commander of the Navy on 11 July 2015. On 22 February 2016, President Maithripala Sirisena granted him a six-month service extension as commander.

On February 1, 2016 contributed to the construction and completion of a temple complex on an isolated mountain in Sri Lanka along with the Chief of Defense Staff, Air Chief Marshal Kolitha Gunathilake, has also provided invaluable support.

On 18 August 2017, Wijegunaratne was promoted to the rank of admiral and appointed Chief of Defense Staff in light of his upcoming retirement from active service. He assumed duties as CDS on 22 August 2017.

Wijegunaratne has also held a diplomatic post as First Secretary and Defense Attaché at the Sri Lankan High Commission in New Delhi between 2001 and 2005. He has been a guest lecturer at the Center for Irregular Warfare and Armed Groups, US Naval War College and the Pakistan Navy War College.

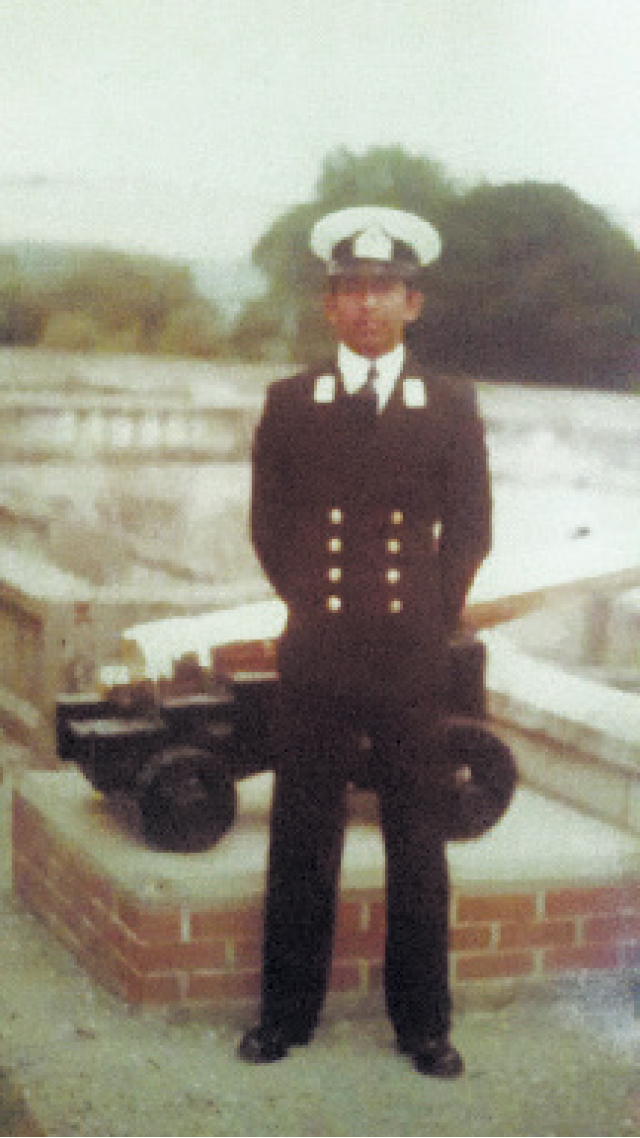
Midshipman Wijegunaratne at Dartmouth

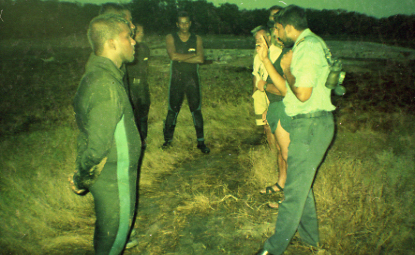
Overseeing a series of diving missions

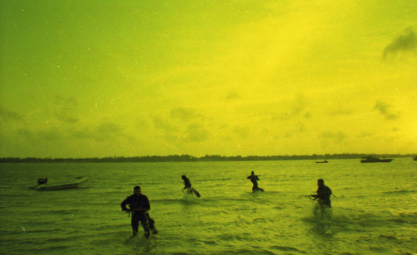
Taking part in an infiltration exercise

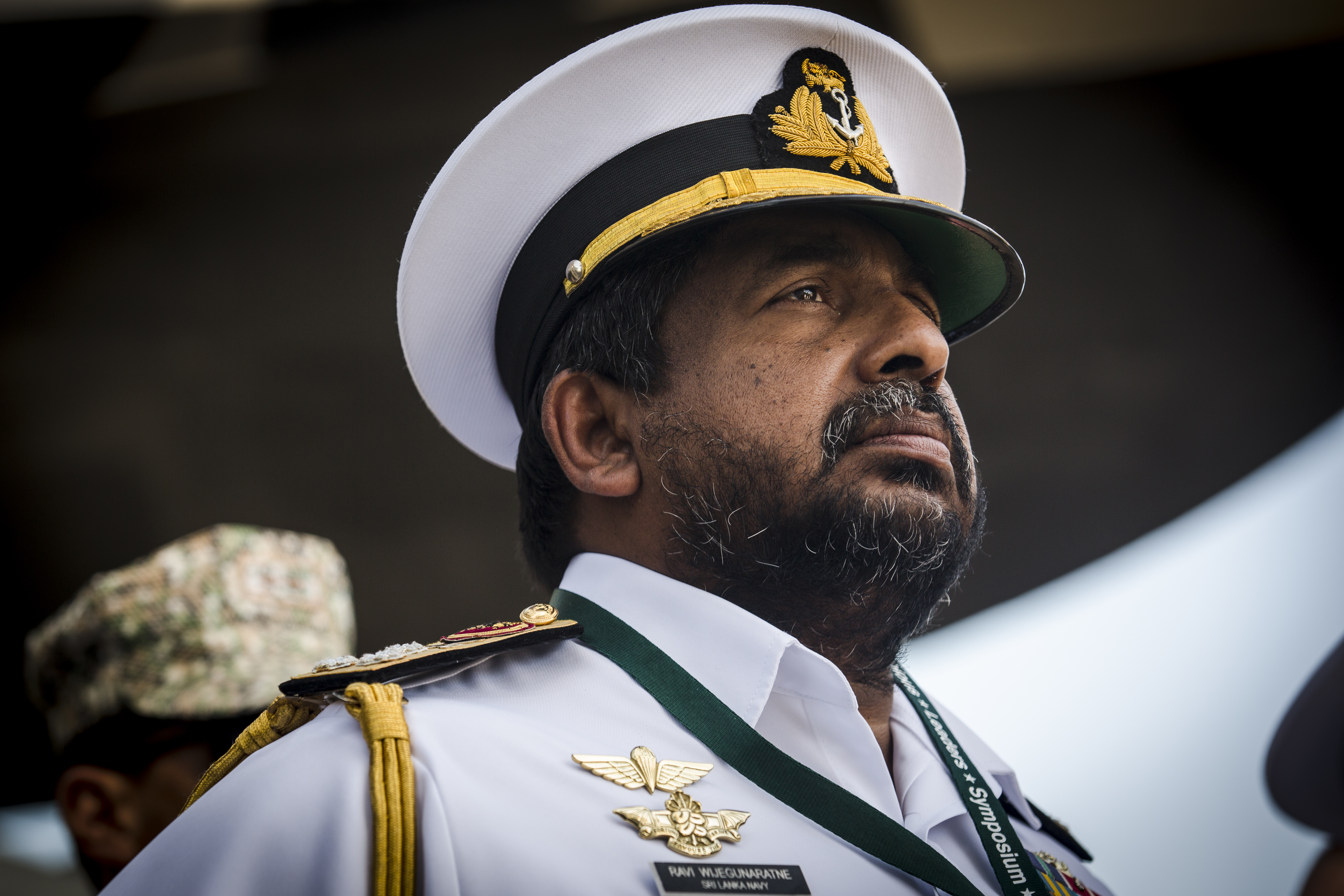
At the USPACOM Amphibious Leaders Symposium 2016

== Later work ==
Admiral Wijegunaratne was appointed as the Sri Lankan High Commissioner to Pakistan by President Ranil Wickremesinghe in October 2023.

== Honors ==
His decorations include Weerodara Vibhushanaya, Rana Wickrama Padakkama twice, Rana Sura Padakkama for gallantry; Vishista Seva Vibhushanaya and Uttama Seva Padakkama for meritorious service, and the Surface Warfare Badge.

Weerodara Vibhushanaya	Rana Wickrama Padakkama (with bar)	Rana Sura Padakkama	Vishista Seva Vibhushanaya
Uttama Seva Padakkama	Videsha Seva Padakkama	Sri Lanka Navy 50th Anniversary Medal (with clasp)	Sri Lanka Armed Services Long Service Medal
50th Independence Anniversary Commemoration Medal	Eastern Humanitarian Operations Medal (with clasp)	Northern Humanitarian Operations Medal	North and East Operations Medal (with two clasp)
Purna Bhumi Padakkama	Vadamarachchi Operation Medal	Riviresa Campaign Services Medal	Nishan-e-Imtiaz

On 13 February 2019, Admiral Wijegunaratne was awarded the Nishan-e-Imtiaz (Military) Medal by the President of Pakistan in Islamabad.

== Personal life ==
Wijegunaratne is married to Yamuna De Saram and has one son, Satyajith. He has been a keen sportsman since his childhood, and is a qualified diver and parachutist; a parachuting accident in 2001 led to Wijegunaratne breaking both legs. In addition to playing hockey and basketball at school, he has represented the SLN in rugby, and rowing/sailing, both of which he has received Sri Lanka Navy Colours for. He is an expert marksman, and has held the Chair of the Sri Lanka Rifle Association and the Sri Lanka Navy Golf Club.

== Controversy ==
Wijegunaratne was alleged to have threatened and assaulted a journalist during an SLN intervention during a violent dockworkers' strike at the Hambantota Port in December 2016

== See also ==
- Sri Lanka Navy
- Special Boat Squadron (Sri Lanka)
- Sri Lankan Non Career Diplomats

Military offices
Preceded by Crishantha de Silva	Chief of the Defence Staff; August 2017 - January 2020	Succeeded by Shavendra Silva
Preceded by Jayantha Perera	Commander of the Sri Lankan Navy; July 2015 - August 2017	Succeeded by Travis Sinniah
Preceded by Jayantha Perera	Chief of Staff of the Sri Lankan Navy; July 2014 - July 2015	Succeeded by Sirimevan Ranasinghe
