= Upul De Silva =

Rear Admiral Upul De Silva
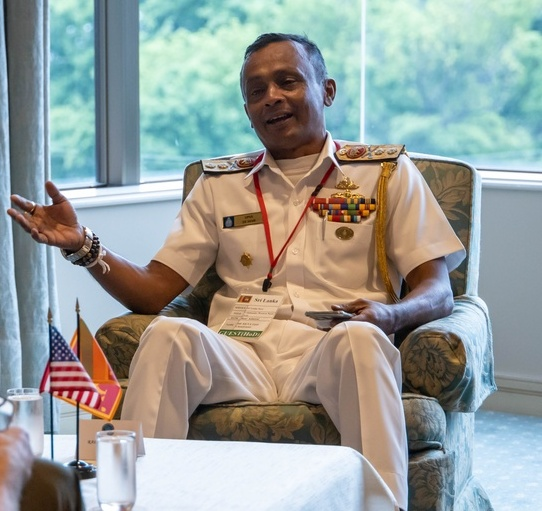
- Rear Adm. Upul De Silva in July 2022
- Allegiance: Sri Lanka
- Branch: Sri Lanka Navy
- Service years: 1986 – 2022
- Rank: Rear Admiral
- Commands: Chief of Staff; Western Naval Command; Commandant Volunteer Naval Force
- Awards: RWP, USP
- Spouse: Mrs. Shyama Thilakarathne

Rear Admiral (retired) Upul De Silva, RWP, RSP, USP, psc was a Sri Lankan admiral who served as Chief of Staff of the Sri Lanka Navy. Silva also holds the office as Commander, Western Naval Area. Prior to this appointment, he was Deputy Chief of Staff in Sri Lankan Navy. He also served as the Commandant of Volunteer Naval Force at the Volunteer Naval Force Headquarters.

== Early life and education ==
Upul De Silva educated at Bandarawela Central College. After join Sri Lanka Navy, he has had his basic training at Naval and Maritime Academy in Trincomalee, then completed Sub Lieutenant Technical Course in India. Admiral Silva completed his Command and Staff Course at Naval Staff College, US Naval War College, RI, USA. He completed the Defence Management Course in India, the Group Commander Course in China and achieved his MS Degree in Defence and Strategic Studies in National Defence University, China.

== Career ==
He joined the Sri Lanka Navy in 1986 as an Officer Cadet, to the Executive branch. He was promoted to Rear Admiral in 2019 from Commodore. On 22 June 2022 he was appointed as Chief of Staff, Sri Lanka Navy by the President and Commander-in-Chief of Armed Forces of Sri Lanka, Gotabaya Rajapaksa. And he went retirement on 9 July, 2022.
