= Deputy Chief of Staff =

Deputy Chief of Staff and similar titles can refer to:

== Military positions ==
=== United States ===
Air Force

- Deputy Chief of Staff for Intelligence, Surveillance, Reconnaissance, and Cyber Effects Operations of the United States Air Force
- Deputy Chief of Staff for Operations of the United States Air Force
- Deputy Chief of Staff for Strategic Deterrence and Nuclear Integration of the United States Air Force

Army

- Deputy Chief of Staff of the United States Army
- Deputy Chief of Staff G-1 Personnel of The United States Army
- Deputy Chief of Staff G-2 United States Army Intelligence
- Deputy Chief of Staff for Operations, Plans and Training (G-3/5/7)
- Deputy Chief of Staff G-8 Programs of The United States Army

Marine Corps

- Deputy Commandant for Aviation, named Deputy Chief of Staff (Air) from 1962 to 1998

=== Other militaries ===
- Deputy Chief of Staff of the Armed Forces of the Philippines
- Deputy Chief of Staff of the Sri Lanka Army
- Deputy Chief of Staff of the Sri Lanka Navy
- Deputy Chief of the Defence Staff, United Kingdom

== Political positions ==
- Deputy Downing Street Chief of Staff, an aide to the Prime Minister of the United Kingdom
- White House Deputy Chief of Staff, an aide to the President of the United States

== See also ==
- Chief of staff
- Deputy Chief of the Air Staff (disambiguation)
- Deputy Chief of the Army Staff (disambiguation)
- Deputy Chief of the General Staff (disambiguation)
- Deputy Chief of the Naval Staff (disambiguation)
- Vice Chief of Staff of the United States Army
