= Chief of Staff of the Sri Lanka Navy =

Chief of Staff of the Navy
- Sri Lanka Navy
- Type: Very senior post
- Status: Two star admiral
- Abbreviation: COS
- Reports to: Commander of the Navy
- Residence: Colombo
- Seat: Navy HQ
- Nominator: President of Sri Lanka
- Appointer: President of Sri Lanka
- Term length: Not fixed
- Formation: 1949
- Deputy: Deputy Chief of Staff

Chief of Staff of the Navy has been the title of the second in command of the Sri Lanka Navy. The post is held by a regular officer of the rank of Rear Admiral and is the second most senior position in the navy. Chief of Staff is charged with assisting the Navy Commander in both operational and administrative aspects, functioning as the Acting Navy Commander in his absences or incantation. Chief of Staff is assisted by the Deputy Chief of Staff of the Navy.

== List of chiefs of staff ==
- Information missing from 1951 to 31 December 1976

| No | Chief of staff | Took office | Left office | Notes |
|---|---|---|---|---|
| | Commander Royce de Mel | 1951 | | CaptainRoyce de Mel was appointed as 4th Commander of the Navy and promoted to Rear Admiral becoming the first serving officer to hold the rank. |
| | Captain Rajan Kadiragamar | | | Later Captain Rajan Kadiragamar was appointed as 5th Commander of the Navy and promoted to Rear Admiral 1959 . |
| | Commander D. V. Hunter | | | Later Commander D. V. Hunter was appointed as 6th Commander of the Navy and promoted to Rear Admiral 1959 . |
| | Commodore Basil Gunasekara | 1971 | 1973 | Later Commodore Basil Gunasekara was appointed as 7th Commander of the Navy and promoted to Rear Admiral and on his retirement he was promoted to the rank of Vice Admiral. |
| | Commodore Henry Perera | 1 January 1977 | 31 May 1979 | Later Commodore Henry Perera was appointed as 8th Commander of the Navy and promoted to Rear Admiral and on his retirement he was promoted to the rank of Vice Admiral. |
| | Commodore Asoka de Silva | 1 July 1979 | 31 May 1983 | Later Commodore Asoka de Silva was appointed as 9th Commander of the Navy and promoted to Rear Admiral. On 1 August 1986 he was promoted to Vice Admiral becoming the first naval officer to hold the rank. |
| | Commodore H. A. Silva | 1 July 1983 | 31 October 1986 | Later Commodore H. A. Silva was appointed as 10th Commander of the Navy and promoted to Rear Admiral and on his retirement he was promoted to the rank of Vice Admiral. |
| | Rear Admiral Justin Jayasuriya | 10 November 1986 | 28 March 1990 | |
| | Rear Admiral Clancy Fernando | 4 April 1990 | 31 July 1991 | Later Rear Admiral Clancy Fernando was appointed as 11th Commander of the Navy and promoted to Vice Admiral. He was assassinated by a LTTE suicide bomber on 16 November 1992, and posthumously promoted to Admiral. |
| | Rear Admiral F.N.Q. Wickramaratne | 3 January 1992 | 4 October 1992 | |
| | Rear Admiral D. A. M. R. Samarasekara | 6 October 1992 | 15 November 1992 | |
| | Rear Admiral H. C. A. C. Thisera | 1 July 1994 | 27 January 1997 | |
| | Rear Admiral D.K. Dassanayake | 7 February 1997 | 31 March 1998 | |
| | Rear Admiral Daya Sandagiri | 30 March 1998 | 31 December 2000 | Later Rear Admiral Daya Sandagiri was appointed as 14th Commander of the Navy and promoted to Vice Admiral and on his retirement he was promoted to Admiral and appointed as Chief of the Defence Staff. |
| | Rear Admiral AHM Razeek | 1 January 2001 | 28 February 2001 | |
| | Rear Admiral Mohan Wijewickrama | 2 March 2001 | 23 November 2005 | In 2019 President Maithripala Sirisena assigned him the rank of Vice Admiral from the date of retirement. |
| | Rear Admiral Sarath Ratnakeerthi | 25 November 2005 | 15 July 2006 | |
| | Rear Admiral Sarath Weerasekara | 17 July 2006 | 28 October 2006 | |
| | Rear Admiral CN Thuduwewatta | 30 October 2006 | 20 May 2007 | |
| | Rear Admiral TMWKB Tennakoon | 21 May 2007 | 6 June 2008 | |
| | Rear Admiral MRU Siriwardena | 7 June 2008 | 15 May 2009 | |
| | Rear Admiral Thisara Samarasinghe | 16 May 2009 | 14 July 2009 | Later Rear Admiral Thisara Samarasinghe was appointed as 16th Commander of the Navy and promoted to Vice Admiral and on his retirement he was promoted to the rank of Admiral. |
| | Rear Admiral D. W. A. S. Dissanayake | 15 July 2009 | 14 January 2011 | Later Rear Admiral D. W. A. S. Dissanayake was appointed as 17th Commander of the Navy and promoted to Vice Admiral and on his retirement he was promoted to the rank of Admiral. |
| | Vacant | 14 January 2011 | 27 September 2012 | |
| | Rear Admiral MTDJ Dharmasiriwardane | 27 September 2012 | 3 July 2013 | |
| | Rear Admiral Jayantha Perera | 4 July 2013 | 30 June 2014 | Later Rear Admiral Jayantha Perera was appointed as 19th Commander of the Navy and promoted to Vice Admiral and on his retirement he was promoted to the rank of Admiral. |
| | Rear Admiral Ravindra Wijegunaratne | 7 July 2014 | 10 July 2015 | Later Rear Admiral Ravindra Wijegunaratne was appointed as 20th Commander of the Navy and promoted to Vice Admiral. On 18 August 2017 he was promoted to the rank of Admiral and appointed as Chief of Defense Staff. |
| | Rear Admiral Sirimevan Ranasinghe | 11 July 2015 | 25 October 2017 | Later Rear Admiral Sirimevan Ranasinghe was appointed as 22nd Commander of the Navy and promoted to Vice Admiral and on his retirement he was promoted to the rank of Admiral. |
| | Rear Admiral Neil Rosayro | 26 October 2017 | 1 July 2018 | |
| | Rear Admiral Piyal De Silva | 2 July 2018 | 31 December 2018 | Later Rear Admiral Piyal De Silva was appointed as 23rd Commander of the Navy and promoted to Vice Admiral and on his retirement he was promoted to the rank of Admiral. |
| | Rear Admiral Jagath Ranasinghe | 1 January 2019 | 3 May 2019 | |
| | Rear Admiral Nishantha Ulugetenne | 4 May 2019 | 14 July 2020 | Later Rear Admiral Nishantha Ulugetenne was appointed as 24th Commander of the Navy and promoted to Vice Admiral. |
| | Rear Admiral Kapila Samaraweera | 12 September 2020 | 14 January 2021 | |
| | Rear Admiral Sumith Weerasinghe | 15 January 2021 | 20 March 2021 | |
| | Rear Admiral Ruwan Perera | 21 March 2021 | 27 July 2021 | |
| | Rear Admiral Y. N. Jayarathna | 17 August 2021 | 21 June 2022 | |
| | Rear Admiral Upul De Silva | 21 June 2022 | 8 July 2022 | |
| | Rear Admiral Priyantha Perera | 9 July 2022 | 18 December 2022 | Later Rear Admiral Priyantha Perera was appointed as 25th Commander of the Navy and promoted to Vice Admiral. |
| | Rear Admiral Jayantha Kularathna | 18 December 2022 | 16 January 2024 | |
| | Rear Admiral Pradeep Rathnayake | 16 January 2024 | 15 August 2024 | He was the Deputy Chief of Staff from 23 December 2022 till 16 January 2024. |
| | Rear Admiral Kanchana Banagoda | 16 August 2024 | 30 December 2024 | |
| | Rear Admiral K.D.D.C. Fernando | 31 December 2024 | | |
