= Nishantha Ulugetenne =

Sri Lankan admiral

Admiral Nishantha Ulugetenne
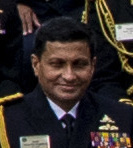
- Nishantha Ulugetenne in September 2021
- Alma mater: Royal College, Colombo
- Spouse: Mrs. Chandima Ulugetenne
- Military career
- Allegiance: Sri Lanka
- Branch: Sri Lanka Navy
- Service years: 1985–2022
- Rank: Admiral
- Units: Executive branch, 4th Fast Attack Flotilla
- Commands: Chief of Staf, Sri Lanka Navy; Deputy Chief of Staff; Commander Western Naval Area; Volunteer Naval Force; Commander Southern Naval Area; 4th Fast Attack Flotilla
- Conflicts: Sri Lankan Civil War
- Awards: Rana Sura Padakkama & Bar; Vishista Seva Vibhushanaya; Uttama Seva Padakkama
- Other work: Sri Lankan Ambassador to Cuba

Admiral Nishantha Ulugetenne, RSP and Bar, VSV, USP is a former senior Sri Lanka Navy officer. He served as 24th Commander of the Navy of the Sri Lanka Navy and current Sri Lankan Ambassador to Cuba.

== Early life and education ==
Educated at the prestigious Royal College, Colombo, where he was prefect and a Regimental Sergeant Major of the college cadet platoon that won the Hermann Loos Trophy twice. Ulugetenne has gained a Master of Arts in defence studies from King's College London, master's degree on maritime policy from the University of Wollongong and a MPhil in defence and strategic studies from the University of Madras.

== Naval career ==
Ulugetenne enlisted in the Sri Lanka Navy as an Officer Cadet in the 13th intake in 1985 undergoing basic training at the Naval and Maritime Academy. On completion of his basic training at the Naval and Maritime Academy, he was commissioned as an Acting Sub Lieutenant in January 1987. In 1988, he completed the Sub Lieutenant Technical Course in India and specialized in gunnery having attended the Indian Navy Gunnery School in Kochi. Having specialized in naval gunnery, he played a key role in introducing guided missile capability to naval fleet with the introduction of Fast Missile Vessels in 2000. He graduated from the Joint Services Command and Staff College having followed the Advanced Command Staff Course gaining psc (j) and a MA in defence studies from the King's College London. Ulugetenne attend the National Defense College, India and gained a MPhil defence and strategic studies from the University of Madras.

Having held several sea and shore commands, including the command of Long Patrol Boats, Fast Attack Crafts, Landing Crafts, Fast Gun and Fast Missile Vessels. He has held several senior positions in the navy. These include Deputy Director Naval (Projects and Plans), Commanding Officer - 4th Fast Attack Flotilla, Director Naval Weapons, Director Naval Intelligence, Deputy Area Commander (North), Director General Services, Commander Southern Naval Area and Commandant, Volunteer Naval Force.

He was promoted to the rank of Rear Admiral in June 2015. He was appointed Chief of Staff of the Navy in May 2019. Prior to his appointment as Chief of Staff, he was serving as Deputy Chief of Staff and Commander Western Naval Area. He was serving as Chief of Staff when he was promoted to the rank of Vice Admiral and appointed Commander of the Navy by President Gotabaya Rajapaksa on 15 July 2020. He retired from active service on 18 December 2022.

== Later work ==
Admiral Ulugetenne was designated as Sri Lankan Ambassador to Cuba by President Ranil Wickremesinghe in October 2023 and presented his credentials to President of the Republic of Cuba, Miguel Díaz-Canel 13 February 2024.

== Honors ==
His decorations include Rana Sura Padakkama twice for gallantry; Vishista Seva Vibhushanaya and Uttama Seva Padakkama for meritorious service. Other medals he has gained over the years include, the Sri Lanka Armed Services Long Service Medal, the Sri Lanka Navy 50th Anniversary Medal, the Sewabhimani Padakkama, the Sewa Padakkama, the 50th Independence Anniversary Commemoration Medal, the Eastern Humanitarian Operations Medal, the Northern Humanitarian Operations Medal, the North and East Operations Medal, the Purna Bhumi Padakkama, the Desha Putra Sammanaya, the Vadamarachchi Operation Medal and the Riviresa Campaign Services Medal.

His badges include: the Fast Attack Craft (FAC) Squadron Pin, the Surface Warfare Badge Commendation Badge, the Naval intelligent Badge, Commendation Badge and the Qualified in Command and Staff Course Badge.

== See also ==
- Sri Lankan Non Career Diplomats

Military offices
Preceded by Piyal De Silva	Commander of the Navy; July 2020 - December 2022	Succeeded by Priyantha Perera
Preceded by Jagath Ranasinghe	Chief of Staff of the Navy; May 2019 - July 2020	Succeeded by Priyantha Perera
