= Sarath Dissanayake =

Sri Lankan admiral

Rear Admiral Sarath Dissanayake
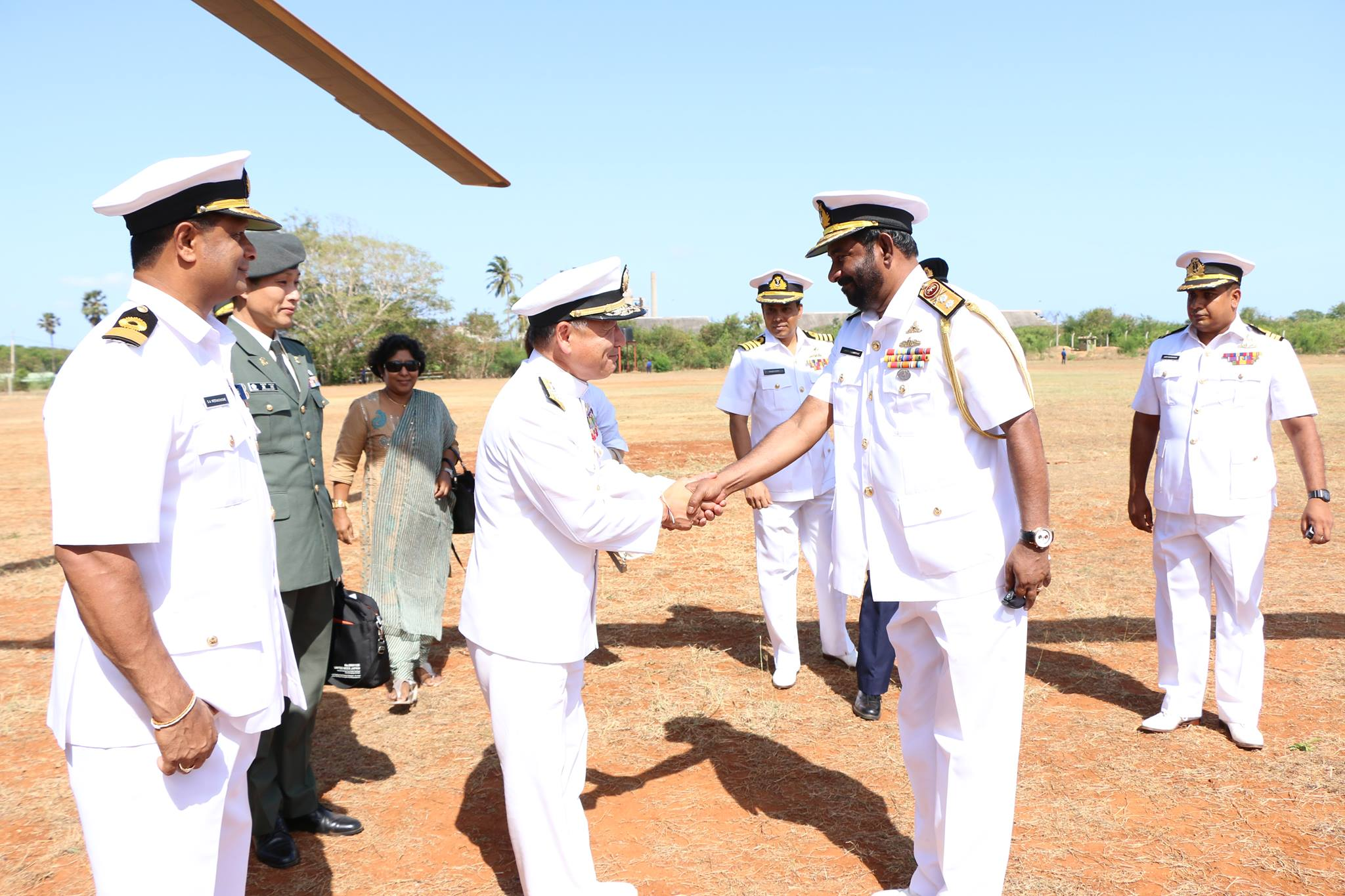
- During Japanese Naval delegates' visit to Northern Naval Command (KKS)
- Born: 7 November 1961 (age 64)
- Alma mater: PLA National Defence University; Osmania University; College of Defence Management; Thalathuoya Central College
- Military career
- Allegiance: Sri Lanka
- Branch: Sri Lanka Navy
- Service years: 1982-2016
- Rank: Rear Admiral
- Commands: Area Commander, Northern Naval Command (ComNorth); Director General Administration; Deputy Eastern Naval Command; Deputy Western Naval Command; Director Naval Personnel; Flag Officer Commanding the Naval Fleet (FOCNF)
- Conflicts: Sri Lankan Civil War
- Awards: Rana Wickrama Padakkama; Rana Sura Padakkama; Vishista Seva Vibhushanaya; Uttama Seva Padakkama
- Other work: CEO-Rakna Arakshaka Lanka Ltd

Dissanayake Mudiyanselage Sarath Dissanayake is a retired Sri Lankan admiral. Rear Admiral Sarath Dissanayake joined Sri Lanka Navy in 1982 as an officer cadet of the 11th Cadet Intake. During his highly decorated naval career, Rear Admiral Dissanayake served on many ships and in various establishments and imparted his experience and knowledge for the progress of the navy.

== Naval career ==
Dissanayake enlisted in the Sri Lanka Navy as an Officer Cadet in its 11th Intake on 15 November 1982, undergoing basic training at Naval and Maritime Academy, Trincomalee. He commanded the SLN flagship SLNS Sayura from 2006 to 2007, where 2 LTTE floating arsenal ships were hunted down and destroyed during the Sri Lankan Civil War. He also held the Flag officer commanding the naval fleet position based at Trincomalee during the Sri Lankan Civil War.

Other key staff appointments he has held at various times include:

- Area Commander, Northern Naval Command (ComNorth)
- Director General Administration
- Director Naval Personnel
- Flag officer Commanding, Naval Fleet
- Deputy Area Commander, Eastern Naval Command
- Deputy Area Commander, Western Naval Command

== Awards & Decorations ==
In order of precedence:

- Rana Wickrama Padakkama
- Rana Sura Padakkama
- Vishista Seva Vibhushanaya
- Uttama Seva Padakkama
- Sri Lanka Navy 50th Anniversary Medal
- Sri Lanka Armed Services Long Service Medal
- 50th Independence Anniversary Commemoration Medal
- Eastern Humanitarian Operations Medal
- Northern Humanitarian Operations Medal
- North and East Operations Medal
- Purna Bhumi Padakkama
- Vadamarachchi Operation Medal
- Riviresa Campaign Services Medal

Badges & Pins

- Fast Attack Craft (FAC) Squadron Pin
- Surface Warfare Badge
- Commendation Badge
