= Y. N. Jayarathna =

Sri Lankan naval officer and hydrographer

- Military career
- Allegiance: Sri Lanka
- Branch: Sri Lanka Navy
- Service years: 1986–2022
- Rank: Rear admiral
- Unit: 4th Fast Attack Flotilla
- Commands: Chief of Staff, Deputy Chief of Staff, Eastern Naval Area, Naval and Maritime Academy
- Conflicts: Sri Lankan Civil War
- Awards: Rana Wickrama Padakkama, Rana Sura Padakkama, Uttama Seva Padakkama

Rear Admiral Y. N. Jayarathna, RWP, RSP, USP is a retired Sri Lankan admiral and hydrographer. He served as the chief of staff of the Sri Lanka Navy and joint chief hydrographer to the Government of Sri Lanka, former commandant of the Naval and Maritime Academy and commanding officer, 4th Fast Attack Flotilla.

== Education ==
Jayarathna was educated at the Royal College Colombo, where he was a senior cadet when the cadet contingent won the Herman Loos Challenge Cup.

== Naval career ==
=== Early career ===
Having joined the Sri Lanka Navy in 1986 as an officer cadet, Jayarathna received his basic training at the Naval and Maritime Academy, where he topped his batch winning the Sword of Honour and was selected for the International Midshipman Course at Britannia Royal Naval College from 1988 to 1989. He was commissioned a sub lieutenant in 1988, and was attached to the 4th Fast Attack Flotilla on his return from the United Kingdom, serving in the Dvora class fast patrol boats that became the primary offensive weapon of the navy against the Sea Tigers as the Sri Lankan Civil War escalated. He followed the sub lieutenant technical course in India in 1989. Jayarathna spent most of his career with the 4th Fast Attack Flotilla, going on to serve an additional officer, second in command, officer in command and the training officer. He also specialized in hydrography, having attended the basic hydrography course in 1995 and long hydrography course in 2003 at the National Institute of Hydrography in Goa, gaining a master's in hydrography from the University of Goa in 2003. He attended the Army Command and Staff College, gaining the psc qualification and a master's in defence studies from the University of Kelaniya in 2001. Jayarathna had served at Naval Headquarters as senior staff officer, projects and plans; and senior staff officer of Navy Hydrographic Service.

=== Higher command ===
Jayarathna took command of the 4th Fast Attack Flotilla from 2007 to 2008, during the last stages of the war. At Naval Headquarters, he had served as deputy director naval project & plans, acting director maritime surveillance, deputy director naval operations and acting director, Naval Research Wing. From 2009 to 2011, he served as the defence advisor to the Sri Lankan High Commission in New Delhi. In 2011, took command of SLNS Samudura. The following year he was appointed as naval assistant to the Commander of the Navy and head of naval research, serving in these positions until he was appointed commandant of the Naval and Maritime Academy in 2014. Having completed the national defence course at the PLA National Defence University, he served as deputy area commander, Northern Naval Area, deputy director, General Sri Lanka Coast Guard, deputy area commander, Eastern Naval Area, and port facility security officer of Trincomalee Port, director naval training, director general training and director general operations. Jayarathna served concurrently as joint chief hydrographer to the Government of Sri Lanka and chief hydrographer of the navy. He was serving as commander, Eastern Naval Area, when in May 2021, he was appointed deputy chief of staff of the Sri Lanka Navy, and in August 2021 he was appointed chief of staff.

He was a member of the Delineation of Outer Continental Margin Project, advisory group on effect of Sethusamudram Canal Project, Interim Tsunami Warning Committee. He also served as a member in the National Committee on Ocean Science under National Science Foundation of Sri Lanka. After about 36 years of service Rear Admiral YN Jayarathne retired from naval service 21 June 2022.

== Decorations ==
Jayarathna has been awarded the gallantry medals Rana Wickrama Padakkama twice and Rana Sura Padakkama; the service medals Uttama Seva Padakkama and Sri Lanka Armed Services Long Service Medal with clasp. His other medals Videsha Seva Padakkama, Sri Lanka Navy 50th Anniversary Medal, 50th Independence Anniversary Commemoration Medal, Eastern Humanitarian Operations Medal with two clasps, Northern Humanitarian Operations Medal, Purna Bhumi Padakkama and North and East Operations Medal. He has gained the fast attack craft (FAC) squadron pin, surface warfare badge and the passed staff college (psc) badge.

== See also ==
- Sri Lanka Navy
