= Travis Sinniah =

Sri Lankan admiral

Admiral Travis Sinniah WWV, RWP, RSP, VSV, USP
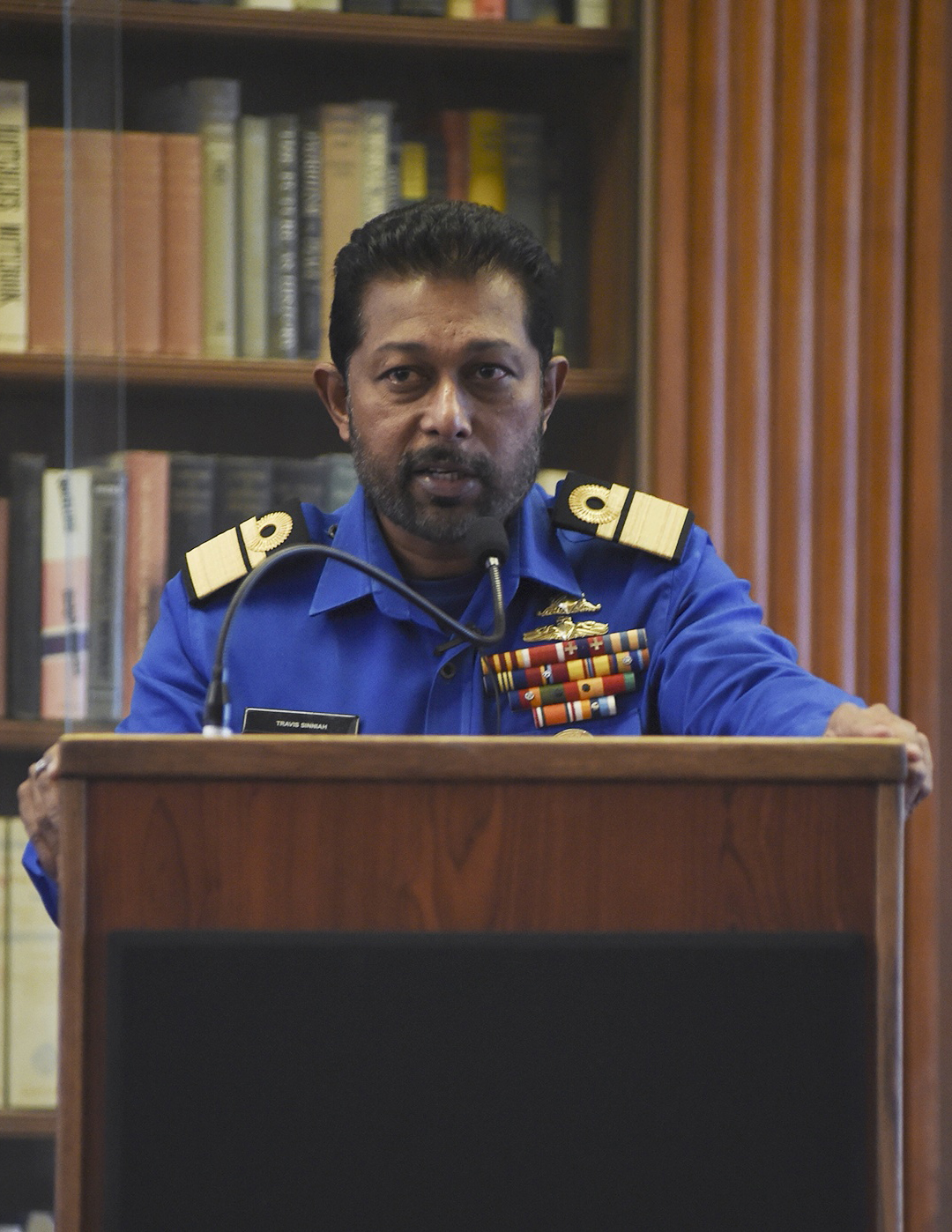
- Born: Travis Jeremy Liyanduru Sinniah
- Military career
- Allegiance: Sri Lanka
- Branch: Sri Lanka Navy
- Service years: 1982–2017
- Rank: Admiral
- Commands: Commander of the Sri Lanka Navy; Eastern Naval Command; Deputy Eastern Naval Command; Deputy North Eastern Naval Command; Deputy North Western Naval Command; Commanding Officer, 4th Fast Attack Flotilla; Squadron Command, 4th Fast Attack Flotilla
- Conflicts: Sri Lankan Civil War
- Awards: Weera Wickrama Vibhushanaya; Rana Wickrama Padakkama; Rana Sura Padakkama (x8); Vishista Seva Vibhushanaya; Uttama Seva Padakkama

Admiral Travis Jeremy Liyanduru Sinniah, WWV, RWP, RSP, VSV, USP is a Sri Lankan admiral and the 21st Commander of the Sri Lanka Navy. He has served as the Commander of Sri Lanka's Eastern Naval Area and as Flag Officer Commanding the Naval Fleet. He was the second Tamil to be appointed the commander of the Sri Lankan Navy after Rajan Kadiragamar in the 1960s.

== Education ==
Born in Kandy, Sinniah was educated at Trinity College, Kandy. He joined the Sri Lanka Navy as a Cadet in 1982, undergoing basic training at the Naval and Maritime Academy and at the Britannia Royal Naval College graduating in 1986. Thereafter he received specialised training at HMS Dryad, HMS Mercury, HMS Collingwood and HMS Vernon. Later he was trained in naval communications and electronic warfare at HMS Mercury and INS Venduruthy. He has attended the Defence Services Staff College gaining a Master of Science degree in Defence and Strategic Studies. He also holds a Diploma in International Studies. He is a Counter Terrorism Fellow (CTF) and a distinguished graduate of the National Defense University.

== Career ==
Having commissioned as a Sub-lieutenant, Sinniah went on to gain several sea commands on many vessels. Having served with the 4th Fast Attack Flotilla as a Squadron Commander and subsequently as its Commanding Officer. During the Sri Lankan Civil War he led the Naval Task Force in the destruction of LTTE arms smuggling ships over a period of two years. He has 37 LTTE hits under his command, and counts over 70 hits by the fleet during his tenure as Commander of the Fast Attack Flotilla. Vice Admiral Sinniah was the officer who apprehended the infamous LTTE ship "Kadalpura" with 19 Black Sea Tigers on board, including the LTTE second-in-command and 9 LTTE leaders, a significant milestone in the course of the war. He was the Captain of the flag ship of the Sri Lanka Navy in 2007 and served as Flag Officer Commanding Naval Fleet, The Commandant Naval and Maritime Academy, Deputy Area Commander East and The Commandant Volunteer Naval Force. He held several staff appointments in the Naval Headquarters as Personal Assistant to the Commander of the Navy; Director Naval Projects and Plans and R&D; Deputy Director Naval Administration; Staff officer Projects and Plans; Senior Staff Officer Research and Development. Served as Deputy Area Commander East North and North West Commands.

Breaking with convention, President Maithripala Sirisena extended Sinniah's service period as Commander by just one month, resulting in Sinniah's retirement on his 55th birthday, on 26 October 2017. This was due to Sinniah opposing the purchase of a ship for twice its value and exposing corruption by the then government and defense secretary.

== Awards and decorations ==
His decorations include Weera Wickrama Vibhushanaya, Rana Wickrama Padakkama, Rana Sura Padakkama trice for gallantry; Vishista Seva Vibhushanaya and Uttama Seva Padakkama for meritorious service, the Fast Attack Craft (FAC) Squadron Pin and the Surface Warfare Badge.

Weera Wickrama Vibhushanaya	Rana Wickrama Padakkama	Rana Sura Padakkama (with two bar)	Vishista Seva Vibhushanaya
Uttama Seva Padakkama	Sri Lanka Navy 50th Anniversary Medal	Sri Lanka Armed Services Long Service Medal (with clasp)	50th Independence Anniversary Commemoration Medal
Eastern Humanitarian Operations Medal (with clasp)	Northern Humanitarian Operations Medal (with clasp)	North and East Operations Medal (with two clasp)	Purna Bhumi Padakkama
Vadamarachchi Operation Medal		Riviresa Campaign Services Medal (with clasp)	

Military offices
Preceded by Ravindra Wijegunaratne	Commander of the Sri Lankan Navy; August 2017 – October 2017	Succeeded by Sirimevan Ranasinghe
