= Susith Weerasekara =

Sri Lankan admiral

Vice Admiral SMB Weeraasekara
- Born: Nugawela, Kandy
- Education: St. Anthony's College, Kandy, Vidyartha College
- Military career
- Allegiance: Sri Lanka
- Branch: Sri Lanka Navy
- Service years: 34 (1978–2012)
- Rank: Vice Admiral
- Commands: Commandant of the Sri Lanka Volunteer Naval Force
- Conflicts: Sri Lanka's war against terror
- Awards: Rana Sura Padakkama, Vishista Seva Vibhushanaya, Uttama Seva Padakkama

Vice admiral Susith Maliya Bandara Weerasekara RSP, VSV, USP, ndu, psn, MSc. (DS) Mgmt, DISS, DIDSS (born 22 August 1959) was a commissioned officer of the Sri Lanka Navy. He was the highest ranked senior officer of the Sri Lanka Navy at the time he was overlooked for the position of Commander of the Navy, leading to his subsequent retirement. A committee appointed by President Maithripala Sirisena found that he was politically victimised by the previous government and he was promoted to the rank of vice admiral in October 2015.

== Education ==
Born in Nugawela, Kandy, he was educated at Nugawela Primary School, St. Anthony's College (Katugasthota) and Vidyartha College. He represented Vidyartha College in Boxing and Rugby. At the age of 19, he joined the Sri Lanka Navy as an Officer Cadet of the 7th intake. During his studies at the Naval and Maritime Academy (Trincomalee) he won several awards including those for 'Highest Aggregate and Highest in Nautical subjects'. Considering his performance, he was selected to undergo the international Midshipman course at the Britannia Royal Naval College, which he completed with a high order of merit. In 1981 he completed the Sub-Lieutenant technical course at INS Venduruthy, achieving a first class pass. Based on these achievements he was selected first in the order of seniority, within the 7th intake. Later he specialised in communications at INS Venduruthy. His grade point average in this course of 94.3%, is still the highest by a foreign student.

He graduated from the Pakistan Naval Staff College (now Pakistan Naval War College) in 1995, achieving first place in the order of merit among students. Later, he completed a Master of Science in Management, with a first class pass, at the Kotalawala Defence Academy (now Kotalawala Defence University). In 2008 he graduated from the PLA National Defense University (Beijing, China) with a high order of merit. He is also an alumnus of the Asia-Pacific Center for Security Studies

== Naval career ==
He has served the Sri Lanka Navy with distinction and valour in several maritime and land appointments, taking part in several confrontations against the Sea Tigers of the LTTE during Sri Lanka's War Against Terrorism.

=== Maritime commands ===
He was the first commanding officer of the SLNS Nandimithra, one of the two Fast Missile Vessels (FMV) acquired by the Sri Lanka Navy. Serving the rank of Captain at the time, he was selected to undergo training and thereafter sail the vessel from Haifa, Israel to Colombo, Sri Lanka. This was only the second time ever, and the first time in over four decades, that a Sri Lankan Naval vessel had crossed the Suez Canal and undertaken such a long journey.

Other vessels commanded by him were:

- P424 - Patrol Boat
- SLNS Rakshaka - Fast Gun Boat (FGB)
- SLNS Ranagaja - Landing Craft, Mechanical (LCM)

=== Land commands ===
He has served as the Commandant of the Naval and Maritime Academy in Trincomalee. It was during his tenure in 2003, that the NMA received the President's Colour.

Land bases commanded by him were:

- SLNS Tammanna, Talaimannar, North Central Naval Command
- SLNS Tissa, Trincomalee, Eastern Naval Command

=== Directorate and area commands ===
During the final and decisive phase of Sri Lanka's War Against Terrorism, from 2006 to 2009 he served as the Director of Naval Operation (DNO), Director General Operations (DGO) and lastly the Commander of the Eastern Naval Area (ComEast). Most of the LTTE's arms supply ships were sunk, whilst he was serving as DGO

His other appointments in directorates and area commands were:

- Deputy Director Naval Personnel (DDNP)
- Deputy Director Naval Training (DDNT)
- Deputy Area Commander, Western Naval Area (DAC-West)
- Director Naval Administration (DNA)
- Director Naval Welfare (DNW)
- Area Commander, Western Naval Area (ComWest)
- Area Commander, Northern Naval Area (ComNorth)

In 2009 he was appointed the Deputy Chief of Staff of the Sri Lanka Navy. Since April 2011, he serves as Commandant of the Sri Lanka Volunteer Naval Force. During his tenure as ComNorth the Northern Naval Command was presented with the President's colour.

=== Decorations and medals ===
He is the recipient of the Rana Sura Padakkama for gallantry at sea and the Vishista Seva Vibhushanaya for distinguished service of more than 25 years, with flawless military and moral conduct. Other medals awarded to him include:

- Uttama Seva Padakkama
- Sri Lanka Navy 50th Anniversary Medal and Clasp
- Sri Lanka Armed Services Long Service Medal and Clasp
- 50th Independence Anniversary Medal
- Eastern Humanitarian Operations Medal
- Northern Humanitarian Operations Medal
- North and East Operations Medal
- Purna Bhumi Padakkama
- Vadamarachchi Operation Medal

=== Other achievements ===
In 1998, he was chosen to command the Naval contingent, at the military parade to commemorate the 50th Anniversary of Sri Lanka's independence. His paper titled "Maritime Security - Need for international cooperation", was presented and well received at the International Security Symposium held in 2008, in Beijing, China. He was one of the speakers at the Maritime Symposium organised in conjunction with the Sri Lanka Navy's diamond jubilee celebration in 2010.

He has represented the Sri Lanka Navy in Rugby.

== Role during War on Terror ==
In early 2009 as the Sri Lanka Army was closing in on the last areas occupied by the LTTE, the Eastern and Northern Commands of the Sri Lanka Navy performed a stellar role in preventing top terror leaders from escaping by sea. By the end of April there were rumors that LTTE leader Velupillai Prabhakaran had escaped or was planning to escape the island by sea. Even the Army Commander at the time Sarath Fonseka, speculated that Prabhakaran might escape by sea.

Speaking to the Daily Mirror newspaper Rear Admiral Weerasekara, then Commander of the Eastern Naval Area not only denied these rumours on the escape of Prabhakaran but issued and open challenge to attempt it if the LTTE leader dared. At this time naval ships under his command in the Eastern Naval Area were maintaining a tight blockade to prevent any escape of major LTTE leaders by sea.

"If he (Prabhakaran) can escape from the country through the sea, we are ready to face it, that would be the final journey for him,"

As predicted, the LTTE leader had no chance of escaping by sea and his body was recovered by Sri Lankan Army troops on 18 May 2009 at the Nandikadal Lagoon.

== Post-war service ==
Since the conclusion of hostilities till April 2011, in his capacity as Commander of the Northern Naval area, he has played an active role in the Government of Sri Lanka's policy of winning the hearts and minds of the Northern populace. This includes the overseeing of Navy's role in resettling internally displaced persons, facilitating the movement of visitors from other parts of the country to North in order to foster reconciliation as well as uplifting the livelihoods of the war-effected populace in the North. He served as the Commandant of the Sri Lanka Volunteer Naval Force up until his retirement.

== Circumstances leading to retirement ==
He was the next in line to take over as the Commander of the Navy, following the retirement of Admiral Somathilake Dissanaike. Not only was he the most senior officer, but also the most qualified and the officer with most operational experience. However, for unspecified reasons he was overlooked for the position by President Mahinda Rajapaksa on the recommendation of Defence Secretary Gotabhaya Rajapaksa. On 23 September 2012 Jayanath Colombage was appointed as the Commander of the Navy, prompting Rear Admiral Weerasekara to apply for immediate retirement. The request was granted by the president in November effective backdated to 26 September, the day on which Colombage was promoted to vice admiral. At that time he was only 53 years of age, with 2 years left to the normal retirement age of 55 years.

== Personal life ==
In 1982 he married [umudini Weerasekara, the first female officer of the Sri Lanka Army. The couple have one son.
