= Weera Wickrama Vibhushanaya =

- Medal, obverse (right) and reverse (left)
- Type: Military decoration
- Awarded for: Individual acts of bravery and gallantry of a military nature during active service performed on a serviceperson's own initiative without any regard for their own life or well-being
- Description: Suspended from a plain suspension bar
- Presented by: Sri Lanka
- Eligibility: All regular and volunteer ranks of the tri-services
- Post-nominals: WWV
- Clasps: None
- Status: Currently awarded
- Established: 1981
- Ribbon bar

Precedence
- Next (higher): Weerodara Vibhushanaya
- Next (lower): Rana Wickrama Padakkama

The Weera Wickrama Vibhushanaya (WWV, Order of Conspicuous Gallantry) (Sinhala: වීර වික්‍රම විභූෂණය vīra vickrama vibhūṣaṇaya) is the third-highest military decoration awarded by the Military of Sri Lanka for:

...individual acts of gallantry and conspicuous bravery of a military nature of a high order in the face of the enemy performed voluntarily whilst on active service without regard for his own security with the objective of safeguarding thereby the lives of his comrades or facilitating the operational aim of his force or for a meritorious act or a series of acts of a humane nature of a high order displayed in saving life from drowning, fire and rescue operations in mines, floods and similar calamities under circumstances of bodily injury or danger to the life of the rescuer...

—

The WWV is the highest wartime military decoration awarded by Sri Lanka that has not been awarded posthumously. Bars could be awarded for further acts of gallantry meriting the award for a second and third time, denoted by a star in the ribbon bar for each additional award.

== Award process ==
The decoration is awarded by the President to all ranks of both the regular and volunteer forces following a formal recommendation by service commanders, and a full review process. Recipients are entitled to the use of the post-nominal letters "WWV".

== Decorated personnel ==
- General Shantha Kottegoda - SLLI
- General Shavendra Silva - SLGR
- Colonel Lucky Rajasinghe - SLE
- General Daya Rathnayake - SLLI
- Brigadier Roshan Silva - SLGR
- Major General Jagath Dias - SLVR
- Wing Commander Thushara Salgado - No 6 Helicopter Squadron Sri Lanka Air Force
- Major General Prasanna De Silva - SLLI
- Major General Sumeda Perera - SLGR
- Major General Nandana Senadeera - SLGR
- Major General Nirmal Dharmaratne - SF
- Air Vice Marshal Anselm Peries
- Rear Admiral Sirimevan Ranasinghe
- Rear Admiral Piyal De Silva
- Major General Subashana Welikala - SLSR
- Air Vice Marshal Sagara Kotakadeniya
- Colonel Prasanna Wickramasuriya - SLGR
- Lieutenant Colonel J.A.L Jayasinghe † – Special Forces Regiment
- Commander Parakrama Samaraweera (MIA) - SLNS Ranaviru
- Wing Commander Thilina Chandima Kaluarachchi † - No. 9 Attack Helicopter Squadron
- Wing Commander Asela Jayasekera
- Major Udaya Konarasinghe - SLLI
- Major Niroshan Ratnayake - SLSR
- Squadron Leader Poojana Gunathilake
- Squadron Leader Sanoj Jayarathne
- Squadron Leader Amal Wahid
- Squadron Leader Chamila G Hiripitiya- Sri Lanka Air Force (No 7 Squadron)
- Lieutenant Commander S. W. Gallage
- Captain Saliya Upul Aladeniya † – SLSR
- Vice Admiral Travis Sinniah
- Commander W.N. Diyabalanage
- Corporal Wickramapala - Sri Lanka Sinha Regiment
- Colonel Channa Seneviratne - SLA
- Wing Commander Dayal Wijeratne - No 6 Helicopter Squadron Sri Lanka Air Force
- Wing Commander Chandika Kanishka Siriwardene - SLAF
- Captain Nimantha Kodituwakku - Special Forces Regiment
- Staff Sergeant Chaminda Wijesooriya - Sri Lanka Army Special Forces Regiment
- Squadran Leader Lasantha Priyankara Kodithuakku † - No. 9 Attack Helicopter Squadron
