= Anura Ekanayake =

Sri Lankan admiral (retired)

Rear Admiral Anura Ekanayake
- Born: 12 January 1968 (age 58)
- Allegiance: Sri Lanka
- Branch: Sri Lanka Navy
- Service years: 1987 - 2022
- Rank: Rear Admiral
- Commands: Deputy Chief of Staff, Sri Lanka Navy; Director General, Sri Lanka Coast Guard
- Awards: Rana Sura Padakkama; Uttama Seva Padakkama

Rear Admiral Anura Ekanayake RSP, USP, psc, MMaritimePol, is a retired Sri Lankan admiral. He served as Deputy chief of staff at Sri Lanka Navy. Prior to that, he served as Director General of the Sri Lanka Coast Guard (SLCG).

== Early life ==
Ekanayake studied at Dharmaraja College, Kandy. He joined Sri Lanka Navy as an Officer Cadet in 1987 for the 16th Intake in the executive branch of the Sri Lanka Navy.

== Career ==
He joined the Sri Lanka Navy as an Officer Cadet in 1987 for the 16th intake He served as Second in Command of Southeastern Naval Area when he was Commodore. He served as Director of Project and Planning at Naval Headquarters. Then, he served as the 6th Director General of Sri Lanka Coast Guard. He assumed the position of Deputy Chief of Staff on 9 July 2022. After served 3 months, he retired from active service on 12 October 2022.

== Personal life ==
He married Sandya Ekanayake and the couple raised 3 daughters.
