= Justin Jayasuriya =

- Military career
- Allegiance: Sri Lanka
- Branch: Sri Lanka Navy
- Rank: Rear Admiral
- Commands: former Commander Eastern Naval Command Sri Lanka Navy
- Conflicts: Sri Lankan Civil War

Rear Admiral Justin Jayasuriya is a former Chief of Staff of the Sri Lanka Navy and Commander of Eastern Naval Command of Sri Lanka Navy. Under his command, Sri Lanka Navy Hydrographic Branch was established on 19 January 1970 while he was serving as Lieutenant.

== Early life ==
Justin Jayasuriya was educated at Nalanda College, Colombo.

Rear Admiral Jayasuriya had served as one time Board of Directors member for Duncan White Foundation.

== General references ==
- Old Nalandian sc's agm
- Office Bearers - 2011/2012 Old Nalandians’ Sports Club
