= Lalith Jayasinghe =

Sri Lankan Army officer

Lieutenant Colonel J. A. Lalith Jayasinghe † PWV, WWV, RWP, RSP
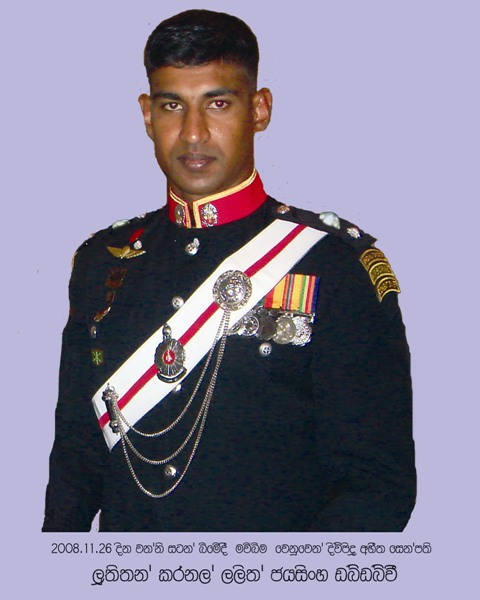
- Born: 29 April 1976; Ukwatta, Avissawella, Sri Lanka
- Died: 26 November 2008 (aged 32); Oddusuddan, Sri Lanka
- Military career
- Allegiance: Sri Lanka
- Branch: Sri Lanka Army
- Service years: 1997–2008
- Rank: Lieutenant Colonel
- Service number: (O/64312)
- Unit: 3rd Special Forces Regiment
- Commands: Unit Commander SF - LRRP
- Conflicts: Sri Lankan Civil War
- Awards: Parama Weera Vibhushanaya; Weera Wickrama Vibhushanaya; Rana Wickrama Padakkama; Rana Sura Padakkama

Lieutenant Colonel J.A. Lalith Jayasinghe PWV, WWV, RWP, RSP (29 April 1976 - 26 November 2008) was a special forces officer in the Sri Lanka Army, who was posthumously awarded the Parama Weera Vibhushanaya (PWV), the highest award for combat bravery in Sri Lanka.

He was killed in November 2008, while leading a seven-man special forces team on a covert operation 30 km behind enemy lines into territory held by the Liberation Tigers of Tamil Eelam (LTTE).

== Education and family ==
Jayasinghe was educated at Avissawella President's College (Previously Nava Kanishta Vidyalaya) and Lumbini College Colombo 05. He was also a member of the school's Rugby team. He married Kaushalya Rodrigo in January 2008. At the time of his death in November 2008 she was five months pregnant.

== Military career ==
Jayasinghe enlisted in the Regular Force of the Sri Lanka Army on 22 January 1997, as a cadet officer. He received training at the Bangladesh Military Academy, where he followed Course 3 offered by the college. On completion of his training, Jayasinghe was commissioned as a second lieutenant into the 6th Regiment of the Gemunu Watch. He was later selected to undergo Special Forces training. After following Special Forces Training Course–24, which he successfully completed, he received Special Forces credentials following which he was then assigned to the 3rd Special Forces Regiment.

In addition to basic training, Jayasinghe had undergone several specialized training courses, both locally and overseas. These include the successful completion of training courses offered by India, China, United States and Bangladesh. He had also received training in military training centers of the Sri Lanka Army in Minneriya, Ganemulla, Uva Kudaoya and Diyatalawa areas. Jayasinghe was promoted to captain, and later, to the rank of major within a time period of ten years. He had functioned as a platoon commander, company commander and also a commanding officer during this time.

Jayasinghe was a specialist in long range reconnaissance patrol operations, and had helped achieve many victories for the Sri Lanka Army during the Sri Lankan Civil War. This includes participating in the neutralisation of Vaithilingam Sornalingam, alias Colonel Shankar, a senior commander of the LTTE, its intelligence leader Charles (killed in January 2008), and Sea Tiger Deputy Leader Kangai Amaran in June 2001.

== Death ==
Jayasinghe was killed in November 2008, during a reconnaissance mission in LTTE held territory. Leading a seven-man Special Forces team, he had infiltrated thirty kilometers behind enemy lines into the Oddusuddan area in LTTE enemy territory and conducted an attack. After completing the first attack, the team had been moving on to a second target when they were spotted by LTTE cadres. Jayasinghe was wounded in the ensuing confrontation, and his team withdrew to a safer location with their wounded team leader. They were spotted again by the LTTE, and in the second confrontation Jayasinghe was killed, while another member of the seven man team was wounded.

A rescue operation was later carried out to rescue the Special Forces team, with the assistance of Mi-24 helicopter gunships of the Sri Lanka Air Force. All seven members of the team were extracted, along with Jayasinghe's body. He was posthumously promoted to the rank of lieutenant colonel. His funeral was held in Ukwatta, his home town, on 1 December 2008 with full military honours.

== Decorations ==
A recipient of the Weera Wickrama Vibhushanaya (twice), Rana Wickrama Padakkama, Rana Sura Padakkama gallantry medals he had also received the Desha Putra Sammanaya, North and East Operations Medal, Purna Bhumi Padakkama, Sri Lanka Army 50th Anniversary Medal and 50th Independence Anniversary Commemoration Medal.

He was posthumously awarded the Parama Weera Vibhushanaya on 19 May 2012 during the country's victory day parade by the president of Sri Lanka.

	Parama Weera Vibhushanaya	Weera Wickrama Vibhushanaya (with two bars)	Rana Wickrama Padakkama
Rana Sura Padakkama	Desha Putra Sammanaya	Eastern Humanitarian Operations Medal (with clasp)	Northern Humanitarian Operations Medal (with clasp)
Purna Bhumi Padakkama	North and East Operations Medal	50th Independence Anniversary Commemoration Medal	Sri Lanka Army 50th Anniversary Medal

His badges include: Special Forces Tab, Air Mobile Tab, Commando Tab, Parachute Badge, Tracker Badge, LRRP Badge, Commando Badge and the Air Mobile Badge.

== See also ==
- Long Range Reconnaissance Patrol (Sri Lanka)
- Sri Lanka Army Special Forces Regiment
- Awards and decorations of the military of Sri Lanka
