= Koyan Chamitha =

Sri Lankan Navy officer (1997–2026)

- Born: Mahavithanage Don Koyan Chamitha; 22 October 1997; Gampaha, Sri Lanka
- Died: 28 January 2026 (aged 28); Welisara, Sri Lanka
- Military career
- Allegiance: Sri Lanka
- Branch: Sri Lanka Navy
- Rank: Lieutenant
- Unit: Special Boat Squadron (SBS)
- Awards: SEAL Trident

Mahavithanage Don Koyan Chamitha (22 October 1997 – 28 January 2026) was a Sri Lanka Navy officer and a member of the Special Boat Squadron (SBS). He is best known for being the first Sri Lankan naval officer to successfully complete the United States Navy SEAL training and earn the SEAL Trident.

== Early life and education ==
Chamitha was born in Gampaha, Sri Lanka. He received his secondary education at Bandaranayake College, Gampaha. After completing his schooling, he joined the Sri Lanka Navy as an Officer Cadet, undergoing his initial military training at the Naval and Maritime Academy in Trincomalee.

== Military career ==
Chamitha served within the Navy's Special Boat Squadron, the premier special operations unit of the Sri Lanka Navy. In 2024, he was selected to undergo the Basic Underwater Demolition/SEAL (BUD/S) training in the United States.

In July 2025, he graduated from the 14-month long program at the Naval Special Warfare Basic Training Command, becoming the first Sri Lankan national to earn the qualification and wear the SEAL Trident. Upon his return to Sri Lanka, he was formally recognised by the Commander of the Navy for his achievement.

== Death ==
On 28 January 2026, Chamitha was found deceased in his quarters at the Welisara Navy Camp. At the time of his death, he was 28 years old. While initial reports indicated a possible heart attack, the Navy and the Ministry of Defence initiated a formal inquiry to determine the exact cause of death.
