= Sarath Ratnakeerthi =

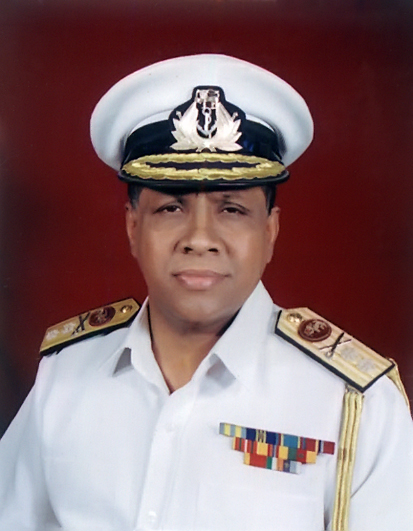
- Rear Admiral Sarath Ratnakeerthi
- Born: 16 June 1951 (age 75)
- Military career
- Allegiance: Sri Lanka
- Branch: Sri Lanka Navy
- Service years: 1971-2006
- Rank: Rear Admiral
- Commands: former Chief of Staff Sri Lanka Navy
- Conflicts: Sri Lankan Civil War
- Awards: Uttama Seva Padakkama, Vishista Seva Vibhushanaya
- Other work: Deputy Commissioner of Essential Services Jaffna District operations officer, Presidential Task force For Resettlement, Development & Security

Rear Admiral Sarath Ratnakeerthi VSV, usp, ndc, psc was a Sri Lankan admiral. He once served as Sri Lanka Navy's Chief of Staff.

== Early life ==
He completed his primary education at Nalanda College Colombo, and his secondary education at Ananda College, Colombo.

== Career ==
He joined the Sri Lankan Navy as a cadet officer on 1 August 1971. He was promoted to Midshipman on 1 August 1972. He was commissioned on 1 August 1975 as a Sub Lieutenant. He is an alumnus of the Asia-Pacific Center for Security Studies, Hawaii USA, attending in 1998. Rathnakeerthi was a specialized gunnery officer who completed his Long Gunnery course in India.

He rose through the ranks of Lieutenant, Lieutenant Commander, Commander, Captain, Commodore and finally Rear Admiral on 1 January 2002.

He served as the 4th officer onboard merchant vessel Lanka Kanthi in 1975. He was the first commanding officer of a Sri Lankan built vessel. He passed the Naval staff course in PNS KARZAS IN KARACHCHI in 1988. He participated In the Fleet Review in Malaysia 1990 onboard SLNS Jayasagara. He graduated from the National Defense College course in India 2001.

He served as the Commanding Officer of SLNS Ruhuna, SLNS Tissa, SLNS Gemunu' and also commanded Naval ships, SLNS Weeraya, SLNS Jayasagara, SLNS Edithara and SLNS Rakshaka.

He represented the commander of the Navy during the 17th international sea power symposium in the US in 2005.

Ratnakeerthi earned the unique distinction of serving as the Area Commander of all five Naval Commands of the Sri Lanka Navy, namely Northern Naval Command, Western Naval Command, North-Central Naval Command, Eastern Naval Command and Southern Naval Command.

Rathnakeerthi was awarded The Vishista Seva Vibhushanaya, the Uttama Seva Padakkama service medals and several other service and campaign medals including the Sri Lanka Armed Services Long Service Medal, North and East Operations Medal, Purna Bhumi Padakkama, Riviresa Campaign Services Medal, Republic of Sri Lanka Armed Services Medal, Sri Lanka Navy 50th Anniversary Medal, President's Inauguration Medal and the 50th Independence Anniversary Commemoration Medal for his outstanding service to the country during the civil war.

He contributed to military hardware purchases from Israel, China and Indonesia and in many naval operations.

He participated in the Pacific Area Special Operations conference which was held In Malaysia.

Rathnakeerthi retired from the Navy on 16 July 2006 to serve as Deputy Commissioner of Essential Services to carryout overall coordination of procurement on shipment of essential food to the north and to monitor movements of ships/vessels carrying food and passengers to Jaffna during the war.

He was appointed as District operations officer to look after the operations in Jaffna District under the Presidential Task force For Resettlement, Development & Security .Rathnakeerthi works with the G A Jaffna and other government authorities in order to rebuild Jaffna province, which was badly damaged by the civil war.

== General references ==
- "Appointed Chief of Staff, SLN". Telo. 31 December 2005. Archived from the original on 8 March 2012.
- "Six boys' schools for Nalanda Squash Tournament". Daily Mirror. 27 November 2010.
- "Nalanda and HFC squash champions by Yasaratne Gamage". Daily News. 10 December 2010.
