= Special Boat Squadron (Sri Lanka) =

Sri Lanka Navy special forces unit

- විශේෂ යාත්‍රා බලඝණය (Sinhala) சிறப்பு படகு படை (Tamil)
- SBS insignia
- Active: 1993–present
- Country: Sri Lanka
- Branch: Sri Lanka Navy
- Type: Naval Special Forces
- Role: Special operations Maritime counter-terrorism
- Part of: Special operations, Sri Lanka Navy
- Nicknames: SBS, Black Kits, Sea Zombies
- Motto: Fortune Favours the Brave (Fortes Fortuna Iuvat)
- Engagements: Sri Lankan Civil War

Commanders
- Notable commanders: Founding Father Admiral DMR Samarasekara (Commander of the Navy) & Chief Architect: Rear Admiral HR Amaraweera RWP RSP VSV USP rcds Psc (USA) First Commanding Officer Lt Cdr RC Wijegunarathne, later Admiral Ravindra Chandrasiri Wijegunaratne (Rtd.) WV RWP & Bar RSP VSV USP NI (M), ndc psn Former Chief of the Defence Staff and Former Commander of the Navy Admiral Ravindra Wijegunaratne- First Commanding Officer.

The Special Boat Squadron (abbreviated as SBS) (Sinhala: විශේෂ යාත්‍රා බලගණය, romanized: Viṣēśa Yāthrā Balagaṇaya; Tamil: சிறப்பு படகு படை, romanized: Ciṟappu Paṭaku Paṭai) is the Sri Lanka Navy's elite special forces unit, modeled after the British Special Boat Service. It was raised in 1993.

It forms part of the Sri Lanka Special Forces, alongside the Commando Regiment (CR), Army Special Forces Regiment (SF), and Air Force Special Forces (SLAFSF).

== Role ==
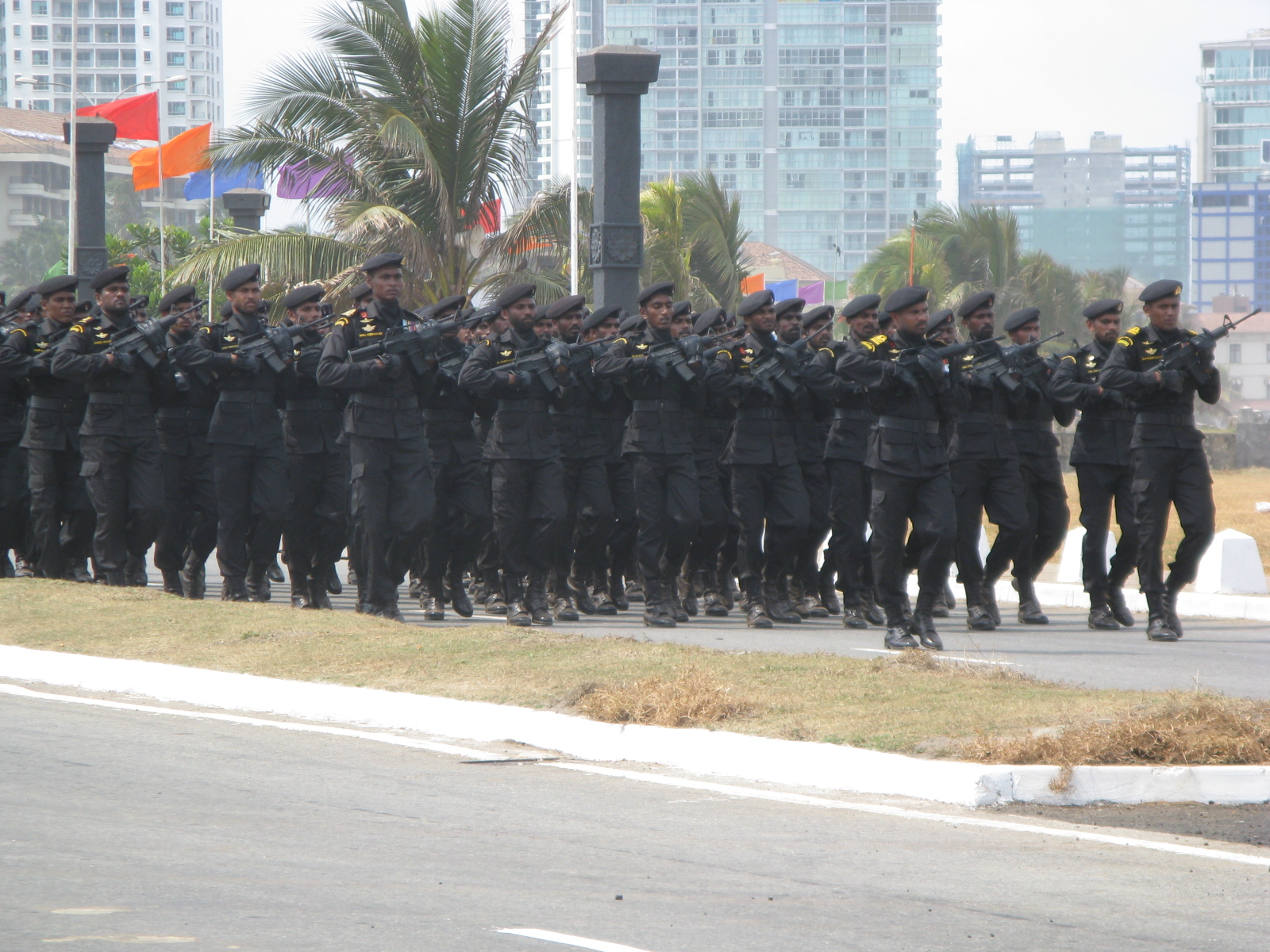
Special Boat Squadron troops, during the Independence Day Parade.

The SBS was modeled after the Special Boat Service of the Royal Navy. In its role as a naval special forces unit it takes up a wide variety of operations such as amphibious raids, maritime counter-terrorism, reconnaissance and target indication, combat swimmer missions and small boat operations. As a Special Forces unit, its role is not limited to water-borne operations. The SBS conducts operations on land, together with the Commando Regiment (CR) and Special Forces Regiment (SF), with regular ground combat units of the Navy and the Army and on many occasions autonomously.

The roles of the Special Boat Squadron are predominantly focused on, but not restricted to,

- Small boat operations in support of littoral operations.
- Covert beach reconnaissance (hydrographic survey) in advance of amphibious assault.
- Covert assault route preparation in advance of amphibious assault.
- Recovery or protection of ships subject to terrorist action.
- Maritime counter-terrorism.
- Reconnaissance and target indication in the deep battlespace.
- Assault on verified targets.
- VBSS operation (Visit Board Search & Seizure).
- VIP protection.

== History ==
Due to frequent resistances and various Asymmetric tactics near the naval troop deployed areas in country, the Sri Lanka Navy (SLN) recognized the imminent need to raise a specially trained counter terrorist team and realized the value of special operations in the early stages of confronting separatist terrorism that devastated the country for over three decades. Although not formerly commissioned, the urge for action of few young and eccentric officers and men who were more than willing to put themselves in the harms' way at enemy's door step, was evident in the early confrontation with the LTTE. Among them, Lieutenant Commander Shanthi Bahar had been a pioneer to lead a small team of specially trained sailors seeking the LTTE hideouts in jungles and thickets of Trincomalee. His untimely death in action delayed the foundation of a naval special force by many years.

The LTTE grew from a guerrilla group to quasi-conventional force and Sea Tigers to a considerable strength. The LTTE and its war fighting mechanism solely depended on the Sea Tiger force for survival, first the logistic train from high seas kept open in spite of determined offensive of the Navy. Secondly, Sea Tigers have been an irritable distraction that lodged Navy's resources to keep sea lines of communication with the Northern Peninsula. Thirdly, Sea Tigers mastered asymmetric warfare with suicide boats, divers, mines and littoral attacks in coastal waters and lagoons

The Special Boat Squadron (SBS) was formerly inaugurated on 18 January 1993 at SLNS Elara in Karainagar, the major naval base in Jaffna Peninsula in the early nineties. The first batch of two officers and 76 sailors, mostly recruits and few Leading rates, joined on voluntary commitment to form the future elite commando of the Navy. Nevertheless, training attrition was high. Finally, both officers and 25 of ratings survived to form the nucleus of Special Boat Squadron under Lieutenant Commander RC Wijegunaratne. Two subalterns, Lieutenant Channa Jayasinghe and Sub Lieutenant SW Gallage were involved in small group raids during their stints. Moreover, SBS developed training on special boat tactics to fight in brown waters and coastal shallows. Soon, the squadron was capable of covert and overt operations on land and sea, clandestine waterborne entry and air mobile operations deep in enemy controlled land, including pre assault special missions in amphibious landing and small boat tactics, along with close quarter surface combat.

The first litmus test on SBS to examine their readiness came even before completion of training to establish amphibious lodgement to reinforce besieged Poonaryn camp. The entire amphibious landing had been a joint affair, though SBS alongside boat crews of in shore patrol craft and dinghies had played a pivotal role in the assault wave under enemy fire. Starting as a small element by securing significant victories, Special Boat Squadron fought with heavily armed, highly manoeuvrable arrow craft, to fasten the fate of the LTTE until the end of separatist war against LTTE enemy fire.

Starting as a small element by securing significant victories, the Special Boat Squadron fought with heavily armed, highly manoeuvrable Arrow Craft, to seal the fate of the LTTE until the end of separatist war against the LTTE.

== Training ==
The SBS are trained by commandos from MARCOS, Green Berets and the Navy SEALs.

== Units ==
- Tier One SOF Team - The most elite, top-level special operations team within the Special Boat Squadron of the Sri Lanka Navy.

== Notable members ==
- Chief Petty Officer K. G. Shantha † - Awarded the Parama Weera Vibhushanaya posthumously
- Admiral Ravindra Wijegunaratne - First Commanding Officer of the unit.
- Lieutenant Commander Samantha Waruna Gallage † - Recipient of WWV, RWP, RSP. Killed in action in Vettalakerni 1996 and a founding officer of the SBS
- Fleet Chief Petty Officer Priyantha Rathnayake - SBS operator killed during interception of Indian illegal fishing
- Lieutenant Koyan Chamitha - First Sri Lankan naval officer to successfully complete the United States Navy SEAL training and earn the SEAL Trident

== See also ==
- Military of Sri Lanka
- Military ranks and insignia of the Sri Lanka Navy
