= SLNS Sayura =

Sri Lanka Navy Sukanya-class patrol vessel

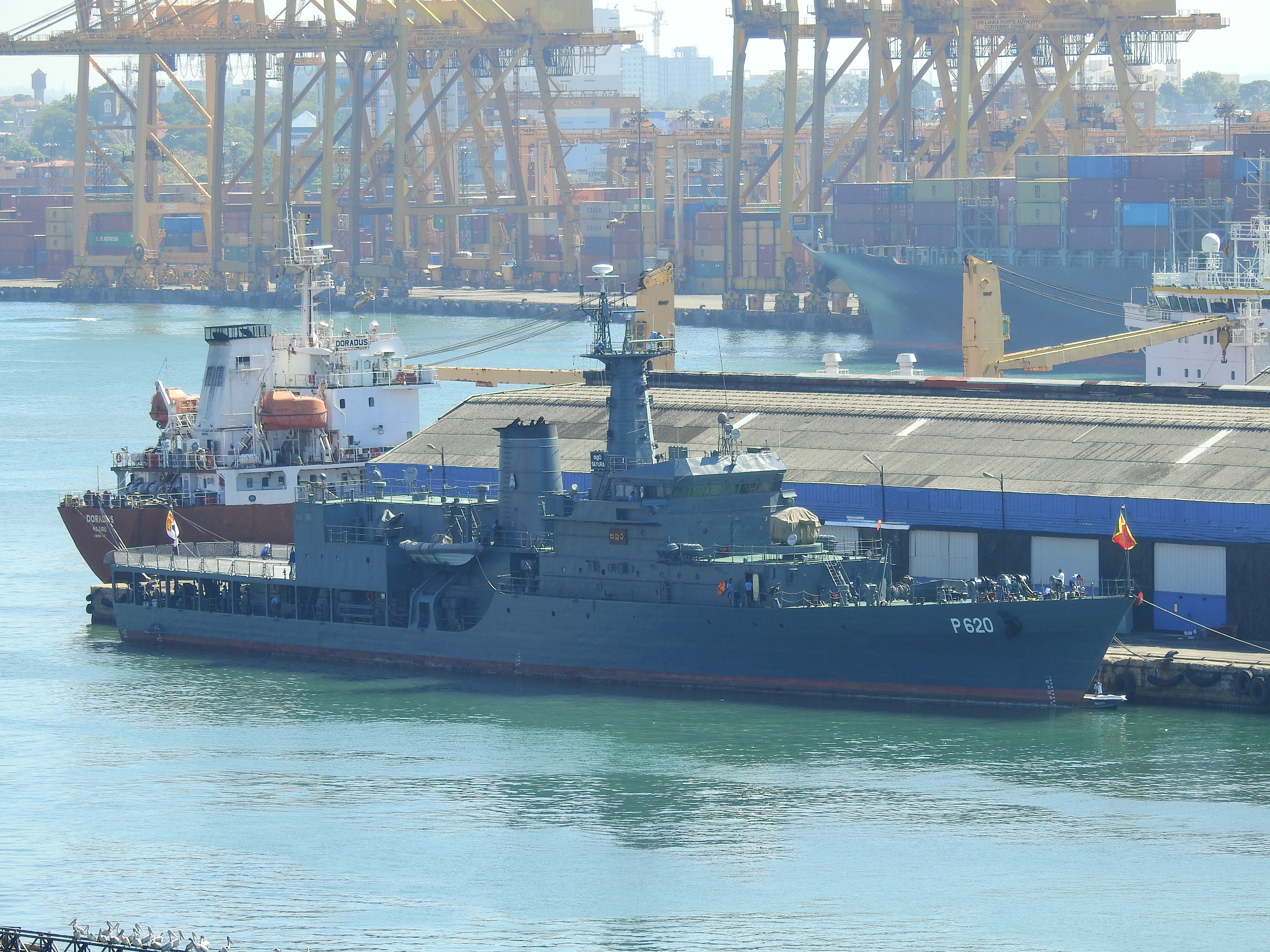
- SLNS Sayura, at Colombo Harbour in March 2017

History

India
- Name: INS Sarayu
- Namesake: Sarayu River
- Builder: Hindustan Shipyard Limited
- Laid down: 25 June 1988
- Launched: 16 October 1989
- Commissioned: 8 October 1991
- Decommissioned: 1 November 2000
- Home port: INS Virbahu, Visakhapatnam
- Identification: Pennant number: P54
- Fate: Sold to Sri Lanka Navy 1 November 2000

Sri Lanka
- Name: SLNS Sayura
- Acquired: 1 November 2000
- Commissioned: 2000
- Home port: SLN Dockyard, Trincomalee
- Status: Active

General characteristics
- Class & type: Sukanya-class patrol vessel
- Displacement: 1,890 tons (full load)
- Length: 101 m (331 ft)
- Beam: 11.5 m (38 ft)
- Propulsion: 2 × diesel engines, 12,800 bhp (9,540 kW), 2 shafts
- Speed: 22 knots (41 km/h; 25 mph)
- Range: 7,000 nmi (13,000 km; 8,100 mi) at 15 knots (28 km/h; 17 mph)
- Complement: 140 (incl 15 officers)
- Sensors & processing systems: 1 × Racal Decca 2459 search radar; 1 BEL 1245 navigation radar
- Armament: 1 × 40 mm, 60-cal Bofors anti-aircraft gun; 2 × 12.7 mm machine guns
- Aircraft carried: 1 HAL Chetak

SLNS Sayura (Sinhala: සයුර, romanized: Sayura, lit. 'Sea') is the former flagship and an offshore patrol vessel (OPV) of the Sri Lanka Navy.

She was formerly INS Sarayu, a Sukanya-class patrol vessel of the Indian Navy sold to Sri Lanka in 2000. She was upgraded with new armament in India before being delivered to the Sri Lanka Navy. India also committed to providing maintenance and refit of the ship.

She serves as the flagship of the Sri Lanka Navy and obtained several remarkable naval victories against the naval branch of Tamil Tiger rebels (Sea Tigers). She was recently equipped with Yingi Y-82 anti-ship missiles and surface to air missiles.

== Operations ==
Sayura was tasked with deep-sea patrolling both within the Sri Lankan territorial waters and in international waters to curb arms smuggling by the Liberation Tigers of Tamil Eelam (LTTE). During the 4th Ealam war after undergoing a major refit in India, Sayura, along with other OPVs of the Sri Lanka Navy, successfully intercepted several ships smuggling arms for the LTTE. In all these cases the ships were sunk when the LTTE Sea Tigers attacked the naval vessels with mortars. Sayura also participated in the Cadex 2009 military training exercises with the Indian Navy after the war ended.

In 2017, it sailed to Langkawi to take part in LIMA 2017 with a detachment of the newly formed Marine battalion.

== Commanding officers ==
The first Sri Lankan Navy officer to Captain the ship was then Captain SMAJ Perera USP, psc.

Since then it has been commanded by:

- Captain (Later CMDE while commanding) AARA Dias RSP, USP, psc, MSc(DS)
- Captain AR Amarasinghe RSP, USP, psc
- Captain RC Wijegunaratne WV, RWP, RSP, psn
- Captain DMS Dissanayake RWP, psc
- Captain (Later CMDE while commanding) KKVPH De Silva WWV, USP
- CMDE SWC Mohotty MSc (DS) Mgmt)
- CMDE NAN Sarathsena RSP, MSc (DS) Mgmt.
- CMDE WASS Perera RWP, RSP, USP, psc

== INS Sarayu ==
Commissioned 10 April 1991, INS Sarayu (P54) served with the Indian Navy until she was sold to Sri Lanka on 1 November 2000.
