= Deputy Chief of the Naval Staff =

Deputy Chief of the Naval Staff (DCNS) may refer to:

- Deputy Chief of the Naval Staff (India)
- Deputy Chief of the Naval Staff (Pakistan)
- Deputy Chief of the Naval Staff (United Kingdom)
- Deputy Chief of the Naval Staff (Australia)
