= Pradeep Rathnayake =

Sri Lankan admiral

Rear Admiral Pradeep Rathnayake was a Sri Lankan admiral and former Chief of Staff of the Sri Lanka Navy. Before he served as Director General of Operation at Naval Headquarters. Prior to this appointment, he was deputy chief of staff and before that, he served as Commander Southeastern Naval Area.

== Career ==
Rathnayake served as the Commander, North Central Naval Area before being DG operations. Being promoted to rear admiral he was Director Naval Projects and Plans at Navy Headquarters. He served as Principal at Merchant Marine Training School while he was Captain.
