= INS Dronacharya =

Indian Navy gunnery school

Coordinates: 9°57′17.04″N 76°14′25.5″E

- Fort Kochi, Kerala in India

Site information
- Type: Naval gunnery school
- Operator: Indian Navy

Location
- Location within Kerala Location within India

Site history
- In use: 27 November 1978 - present

INS Dronacharya is the gunnery school of the Indian Navy. It is located in Kochi, Kerala. It was commissioned on 27 November 1978. It is responsible for training 820 officers and 2100 sailors and Agniveer as well as personnel of Indian Coast Guard per year in small-arms, naval missiles, artillery, radar and defensive counter measures. Friendly Foreign country officers come for training every year. On 16 March 2023 INS Dronacharya got the Award of President Colour by President of India Droupadi Murmu. In January 2024 INS Dronacharya got Award of UNIT CITATION 2023-24.

== See also ==
Indian navy

- List of Indian Navy bases
- List of active Indian Navy ships

Integrated commands and units

- Armed Forces Special Operations Division
- Defence Cyber Agency
- Integrated Defence Staff
- Integrated Space Cell
- Indian Nuclear Command Authority
- Indian Armed Forces
- Special Forces of India

Other lists

- Strategic Forces Command
- List of Indian Air Force stations
- India's overseas military bases
