= Neil Rosayro =

Sri Lankan admiral

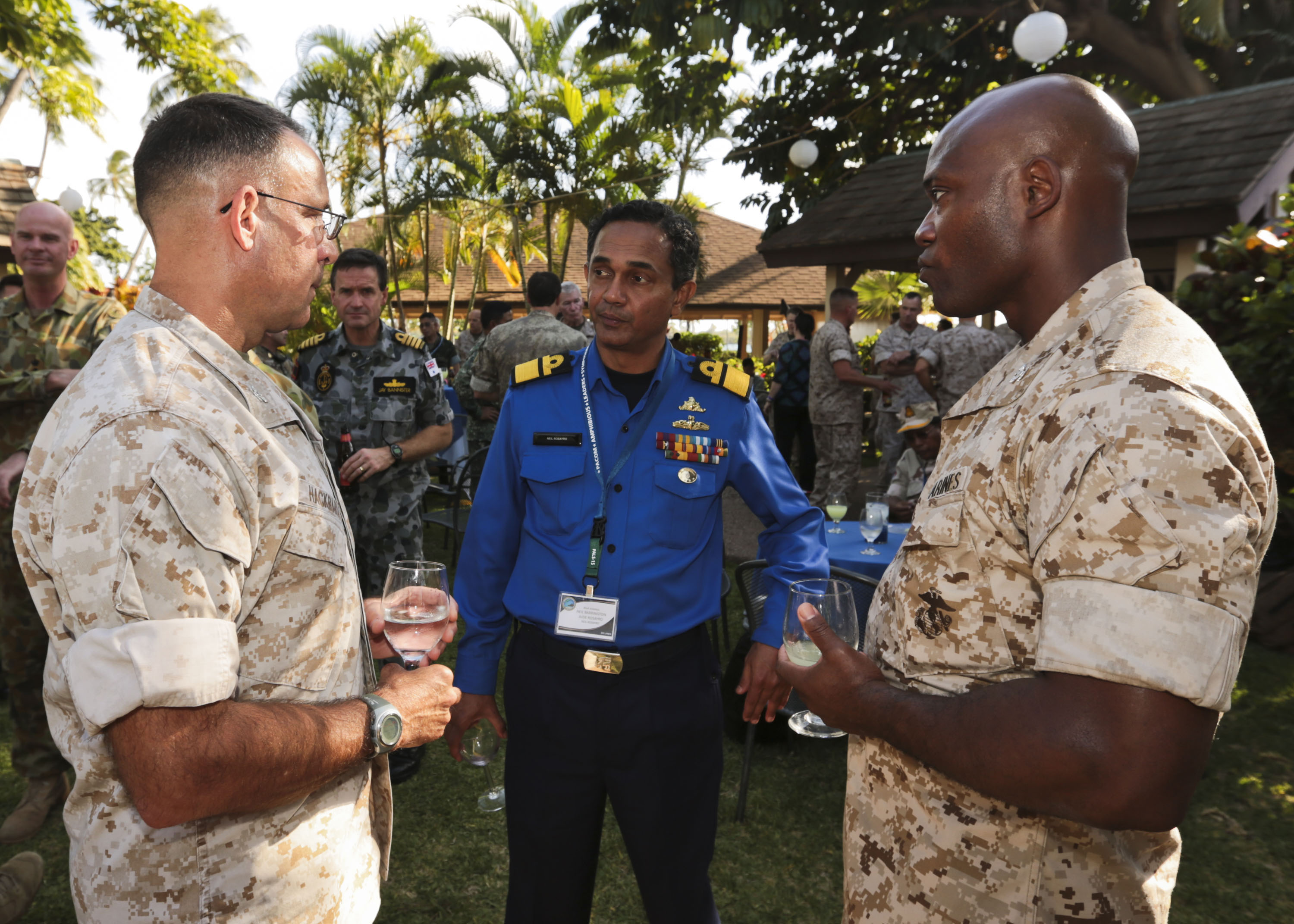
- Rosayro (center) at Hickam Air Force Base, Hawaii, 2015
- Military career
- Branch: Sri Lanka Navy
- Commands: Chief of Staff; Deputy Chief of Staff; Commander Eastern Naval Area; Director General Operations
- Awards: Rana Sura Padakkama

Rear Admiral Neil Rosayro is a retired Sri Lankan admiral.

He joined the Navy in 1982.

He served as Director General Operations from 2013 to 2015 before being appointed Deputy Chief of Staff and the Commander Eastern Naval Area in 2015/2016. In May 2016, he moved to Headquarters as the Deputy Chief of Staff and the Commandant Volunteer Naval Force.
