= Rana Wickrama Padakkama =

- Medal, obverse (right) and reverse (left)
- Type: Military decoration
- Awarded for: Individual acts of bravery and heroism in battle performed on a serviceperson's own initiative
- Description: Suspended from a plain suspension bar
- Presented by: Sri Lanka
- Eligibility: All regular and volunteer ranks of the tri-services
- Post-nominals: RWP
- Clasps: None
- Status: Currently awarded
- Established: 1981
- Ribbon bar

Precedence
- Next (higher): Weera Wickrama Vibhushanaya
- Next (lower): Rana Sura Padakkama

The Rana Wickrama Padakkama (RWP, Combat Gallantry Medal) (Sinhala: රණ වික්‍රම පදක්කම) is awarded to Sri Lankan military service personnel serving in both the regular- and volunteer forces as a reward for:

...individual or associated acts of bravery in the face of the enemy and performed voluntarily...

—

Bars could be awarded for further acts of gallantry meriting the award for a second and third time, denoted by a star in the ribbon bar for each additional award. The award is the only one to have been awarded to a military animal in Sri Lanka.

== Award process ==
A formal recommendation is made by service commanders, and the decoration is awarded by the President following a review process. Recipients are eligible to the use of the post-nominal letters "RWP".

== Notable decorated personnel ==
- Field Marshal Sarath Fonseka
- Air Chief Marshal Roshan Goonatilake
- Air Chief Marshal Jayalath Weerakkody
- Lieutenant General Denzil Kobbekaduwa †
- Vice Admiral Travis Sinniah
- Major general Ananda Hamangoda †
- Major general Sarath Munasinghe
- Major general Nandana Udawatta
- Major general Janaka Perera
- Major general Wasantha Perera
- Major general Nandana Senadeera
- Major general Lucky Wijayaratne †
- Major general Vijaya Wimalaratne †
- Major General Laksiri Waduge
- Rear Admiral Sarath Dissanayake
- Air Vice Marshal Harsha Abeywickrama
- Air Vice Marshal P.B. Premachandra
- Brigadier Udene Kendaragama
- Air Commodore Shirantha Goonatilake †
- Colonel A. F. Lafir †
- Colonel Tuan Nizam Muthaliff †
- Colonel Prasanna Wickramasuriya
- Lieutenant Colonel Lalith Jayasinghe †
- Lieutenant Colonel Gotabhaya Rajapaksa
- Wing Commander Thilina Chandima Kaluarachchi †
- Lieutenant Commander S.W. Gallage
- Squadron Leader Dihan Fernando
- Squadron Leader Amal Wahid
- Flying Officer Chinthaka Hettiarachchi
- 'Commando' Snowy
- Major general S A D A D Gunawardena
- Special Forces Regiment Ekanayake
