= Rana Sura Padakkama =

- Medal, obverse
- Type: Military decoration
- Awarded for: Individual acts of distinguished conduct in the face of the enemy
- Description: Suspended from a plain suspension bar
- Presented by: Sri Lanka
- Eligibility: All regular and volunteer ranks of the tri-services
- Post-nominals: RSP
- Clasps: None
- Status: Currently awarded
- Established: 1981
- Ribbon bar

Precedence
- Next (higher): Rana Wickrama Padakkama
- Next (lower): Vishista Seva Vibhushanaya

Rana Sura Padakkama (RSP, Combat Excellence Medal) (Sinhala: රණ ශූර පදක්කම rana śūra padakkama) is awarded to servicepersons of all ranks of the regular and volunteer forces of the Military of Sri Lanka for individual acts of bravery and otherwise distinguished conduct in the face of the enemy during active deployment. Bars could be awarded for further acts of gallantry meriting the award for a second and third time, denoted by a star in the ribbon bar for each additional award.

== Award process ==
The decoration is awarded at the National Day parade by the President after a recommendation and review process initiated by service commanders. Recipients can use the post-nominal letters "RSP".

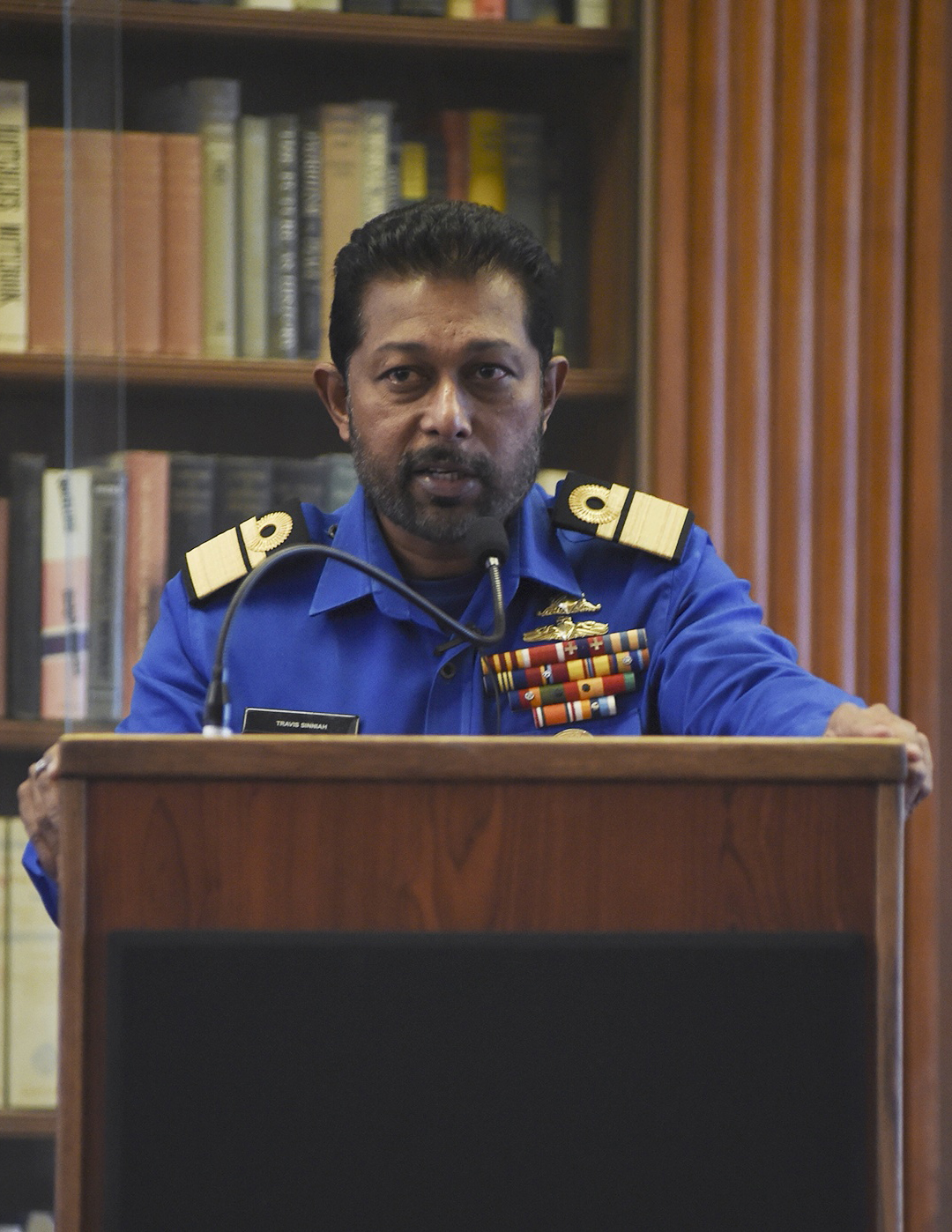
Admiral Travis Sinniah, with his medal ribbon bar containing the Rana Sura Padakkama and two bars denoted by two crosses on the RSP ribbon (third from left).

== Notable decorated personnel ==
- Field Marshal Sarath Fonseka
- Admiral Thisara Samarasinghe
- Admiral Wasantha Karannagoda
- Admiral Jayanath Colombage
- Lieutenant General Denzil Kobbekaduwa †
- Lieutenant General Parami Kulatunga †
- Air Vice Marshal P.B. Premachandra
- Air Vice Marshal Harsha Abeywickrama
- Major-General Ananda Hamangoda †
- Major-General Lucky Wijayaratne †
- Major-General Vijaya Wimalaratne †
- Major-General Sarath Munasinghe
- Major-General Janaka Perera
- Major General Laksiri Waduge
- Rear Admiral Mohan Wijewickrama
- Rear admiral Susith Weerasekara
- Rear admiral Ravindra Wijegunaratne
- Rear admiral Rohan Amarasinghe
- Rear admiral Sarath Dissanayake
- Brigadier Rohitha Neil Akmeemana
- Brigadier D.H.M.R.B.Tammita
- Brigadier Udene Kendaragama
- Air Commodore Shirantha Goonatilake †
- Major-General Fadyl Meedin **
- Major-General Wasantha Perera
- Colonel A. F. Lafir †
- Lieutenant Colonel J.A.L Jayasinghe †
- Lieutenant Colonel Gotabhaya Rajapaksa
- Lieutenant Colonel D. A. Priyantha Dissanayake
- Major General Nandana Senadeera
- Lieutenant Colonel Dhananjaya Weerabahu Wijesinghe †
- Commodore N.A.N. Sarathsena
- Lieutenant Commander S.W. Gallage
- Lieutenant Commander T.R. Dahanayaka
- Lieutenant Commander HMWM Thilakarathna
- Lieutenant Commander HMWM Thilakarathna
- COMMANDER (PRO) C.P ABEYGUNASEKARA, RSP
- Wing Commander Thilina Chandima Kaluarachchi †
- Squadron Leader Dihan Fernando

Squadron Leader Amal Wahid

- Flying Officer Chinthaka Hettiarachchi
- Warrant Officer 1 J.P Gunapala
- Squadron Leader Thushara Salgado
- Vice Admiral Travis Sinniah
- Major General Pradeep De Silva
- Major General S A D A D Gunawardena
