= Naval and Maritime Academy =

Naval academy of Sri Lanka

Naval and Maritime Academy, Trincomalee
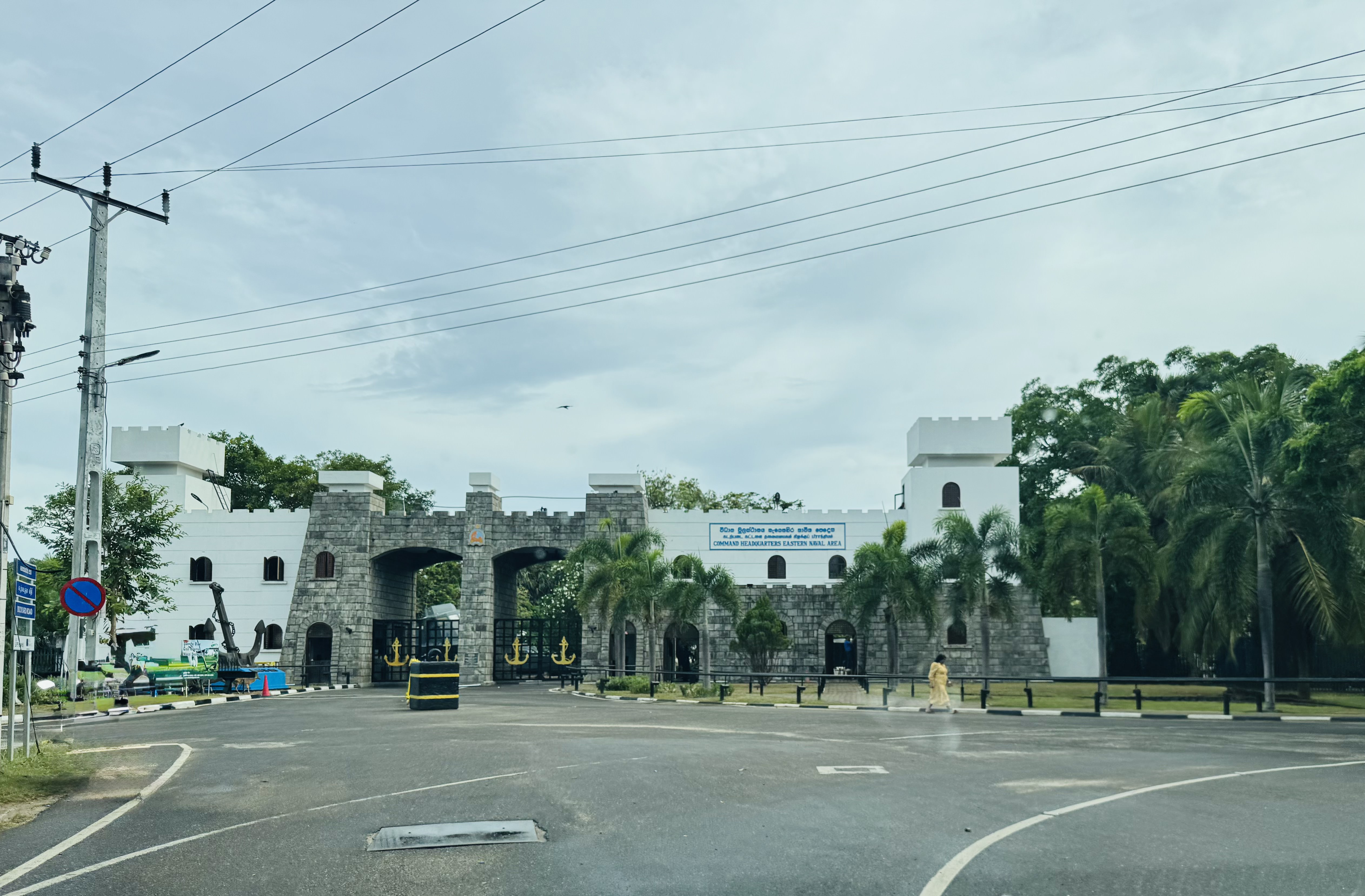
- Main Gate of Naval and Maritime Academy Trincomalee
- Active: 15 January 1967 – present
- Country: Sri Lanka
- Branch: Sri Lanka Navy
- Type: Training
- Role: Officers and sailors training
- Garrison/HQ: SLN Dockyard, Trincomalee
- Nickname: NMA
- Motto: Disciplined are the noblest of men
- Anniversaries: 15 July

Commanders
- Commandant: Commodore Rohan Joseph

Naval and Maritime Academy (NMA), Trincomalee, is the naval academy of the Sri Lanka Navy, and is located within SLN Dockyard, Trincomalee. It received university status in 2001 under the leadership of Commodore SR Samaratunga.

== History ==
The Sri Lanka Naval and Maritime Academy was established on 15 January 1967, and was subsequently commissioned on 15 July 1967 with Instructor Commander M. G. S. Perera as the first Commandant. NMA hold the ISO 9001:2000 Quality Management System Certification awarded by the Sri Lanka Standards Institution in 2007. This was upgraded to ISO 9001:2008 in 2010. In recognition of its service rendered over the years, the NMA was awarded with the prestigious President's Colours in 2003.

== Training courses ==
There are several intakes for cadet officers and midshipmen annually. These are under the following category:

=== Officer mid-career courses ===
- Long Logistics Management Course (LLMC) - Accredited to the General Sir John Kotelawala Defence University for the Master of Business Administration in Logistics Management.
- Junior Naval Staff Course (JNSC) - Accredited to the General Sir John Kotelawala Defence University for the Post Graduate Diploma in Defence Management.
- Service Entry Technical Course (for Engineering, Electrical Engineering, Hull Engineering, Civil Engineering, Administration Officer Health, Information Technology and Band Master Branches) - Accredited to the University of Kelaniya for a Post Graduate Diploma.

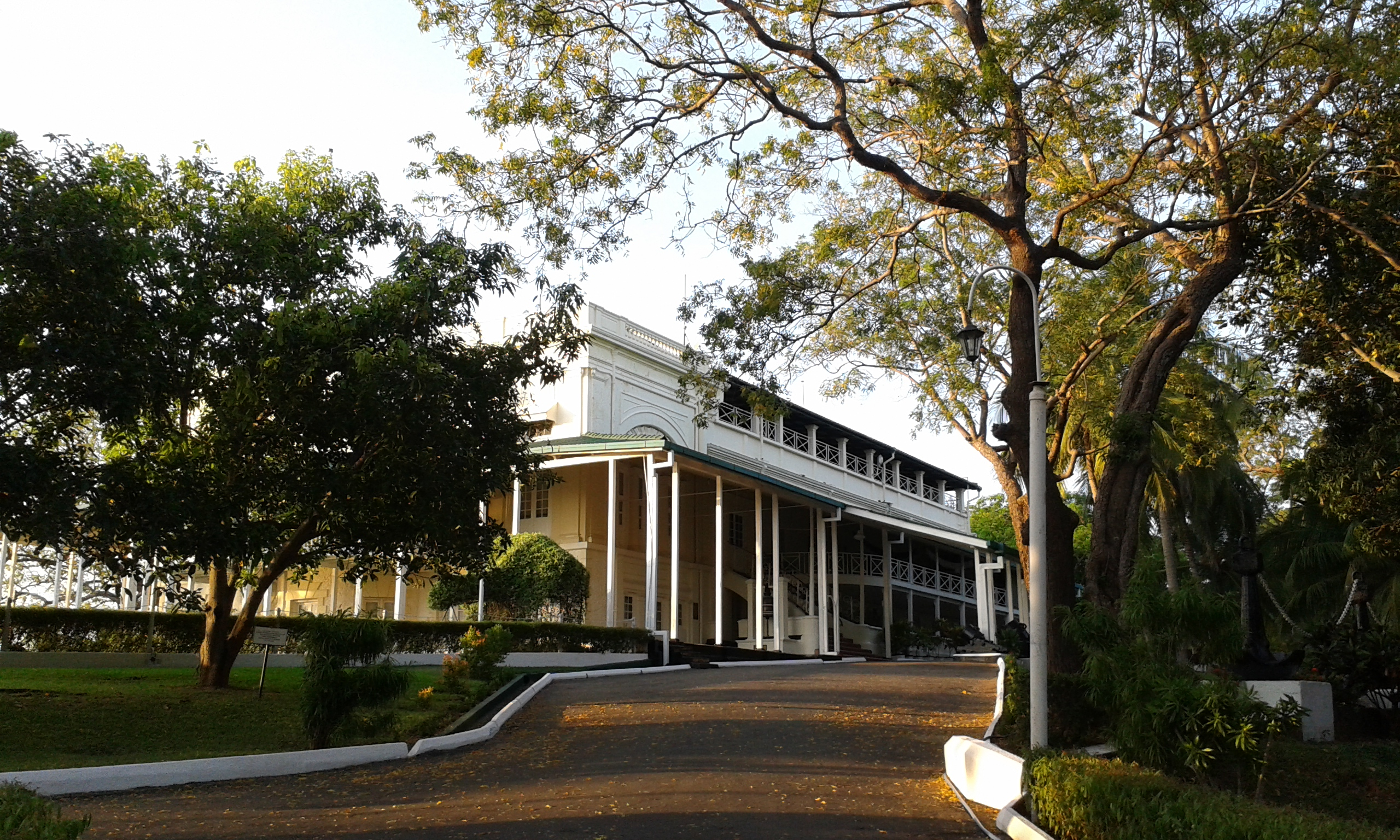
Navy House, Trincomalee

=== Officer entry courses ===
- Sub Lieutenant Technical Course
  - Executive branch - Accredited to the General Sir John Kotelawala Defence University for the Bachelor of Science in Naval and Maritime Studies.
  - Logistics branch - Accredited to the General Sir John Kotelawala Defence University for the Bachelor of Science in Logistic Management
  - Naval Infantry Branch/Provost Branch - Accredited to the General Sir John Kotelawala Defence University for the Bachelor of Science in Naval Studies
- Direct Entry Course (for professionals for other branches)
- General Sir John Kotelawala Defence University (KDU) Entry Course
- Service Entry Course (for serving ratings)

=== Other courses ===
- Long Gunnery Course
- Long Navigation Course
- Long Communication Course
- Long Anti-Submarine Warfare Course

== See also ==
- SLN Dockyard
- SLNS Gajabahu
- General Sir John Kotelawala Defence University
- Sri Lanka Military Academy
- Air Force Academy, China Bay
