= Awards and decorations of the Sri Lanka Armed Forces =

Sri Lankan honours system

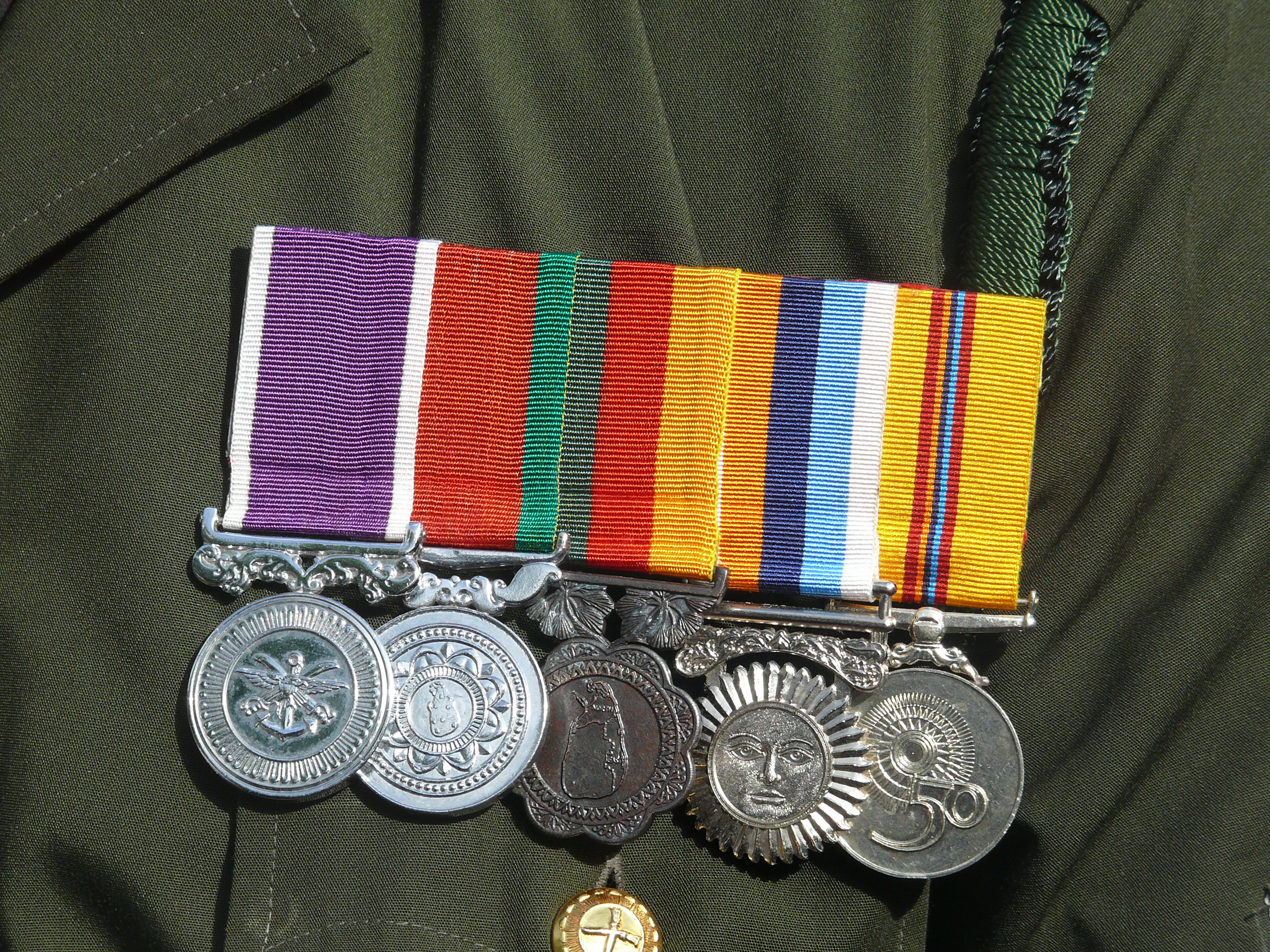
Medals of the Sri Lankan military displayed on a Sri Lanka Army service uniform

The Sri Lankan Armed Forces award medals and their associated ribbon bars in recognition of various levels of service, personal accomplishments and commemorative events while a regular- or volunteer serviceperson is a member of the Sri Lanka Army, Sri Lanka Navy and the Sri Lanka Air Force. Together with military badges, such awards are a means to outwardly display the highlights of a serviceperson's career.

== Medals for gallantry ==
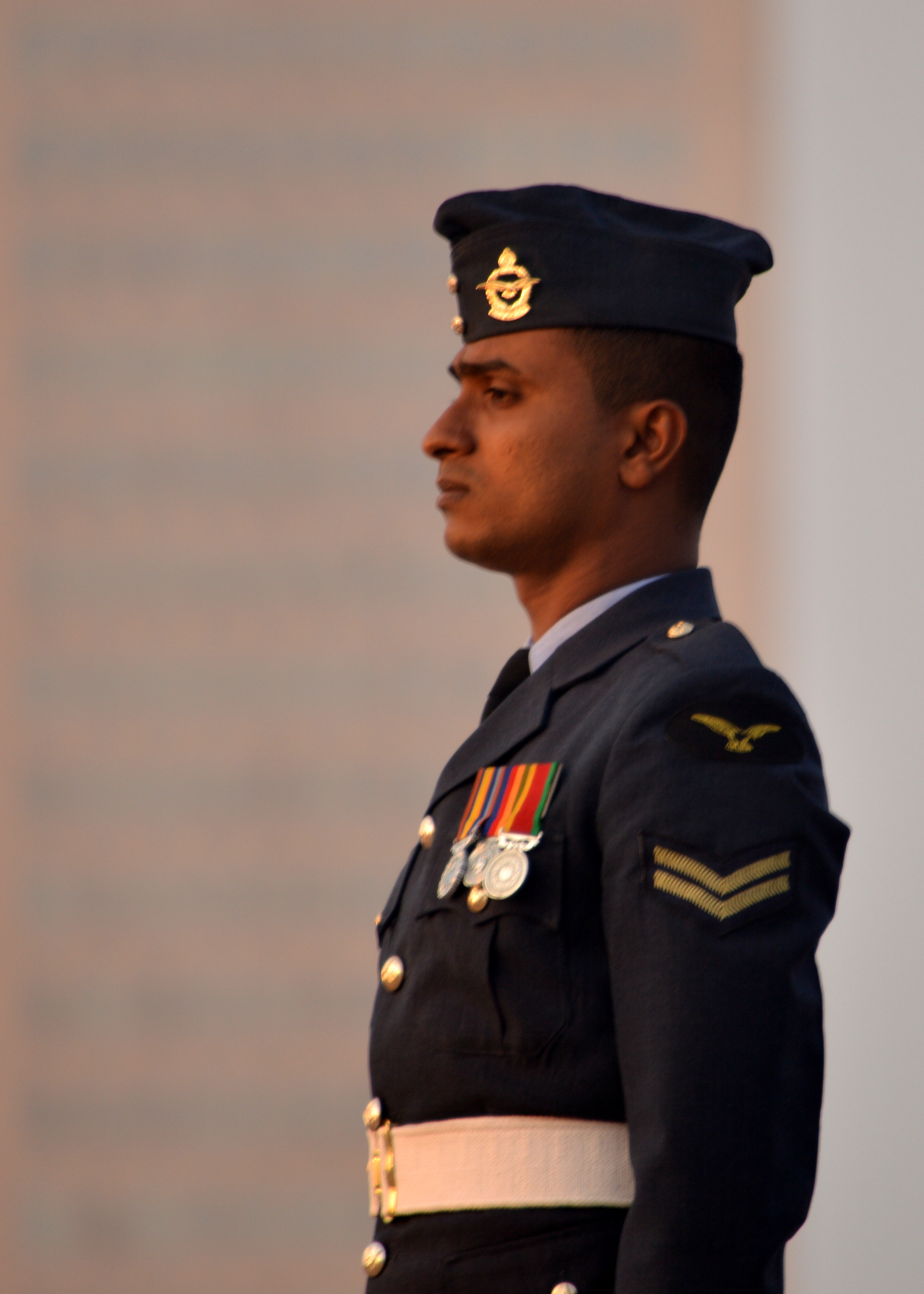
An Air Force serviceman in parade uniform, with medals pinned on left breast

- Parama Weera Vibhushanaya (Order of the Supreme Valour)
- Weerodara Vibhushanaya (Order of Courage)
- Weera Wickrama Vibhushanaya (Order of Conspicuous Gallantry)
- Rana Wickrama Padakkama (Combat Gallantry Medal)
- Rana Sura Padakkama (Combat Excellence Medal)

== Sri Lanka orders ==
- Vishista Seva Vibhushanaya (Distinguished Service Order)
- Karyakshama Seva Vibhushanaya (Efficient Service Order) (Sri Lanka Army Volunteer Force)
- Prashansaniya Seva Vibhushanaya (Commendable Service Order) (Sri Lanka Volunteer Naval Force)

== Wound medals ==
- Uththama Pooja Pranama Padakkama (Medal of Honour for Supreme Sacrifice)
- Desha Puthra Sammanaya (Son of the Nation Award)

== Medals for long service and good conduct ==
- Uththama Seva Padakkama (Meritorious Service Medal)
- Sri Lanka Armed Services Long Service Medal
- Karyakshama Seva Padakkama (Efficient Service Medal) (Sri Lanka Army Volunteer Force)
- Prashansaniya Seva Padakkama (Commendable Service Medal) (Sri Lanka Volunteer Naval Force)
- Videsha Seva Padakkama (Foreign Service Medal)

== War service medals ==
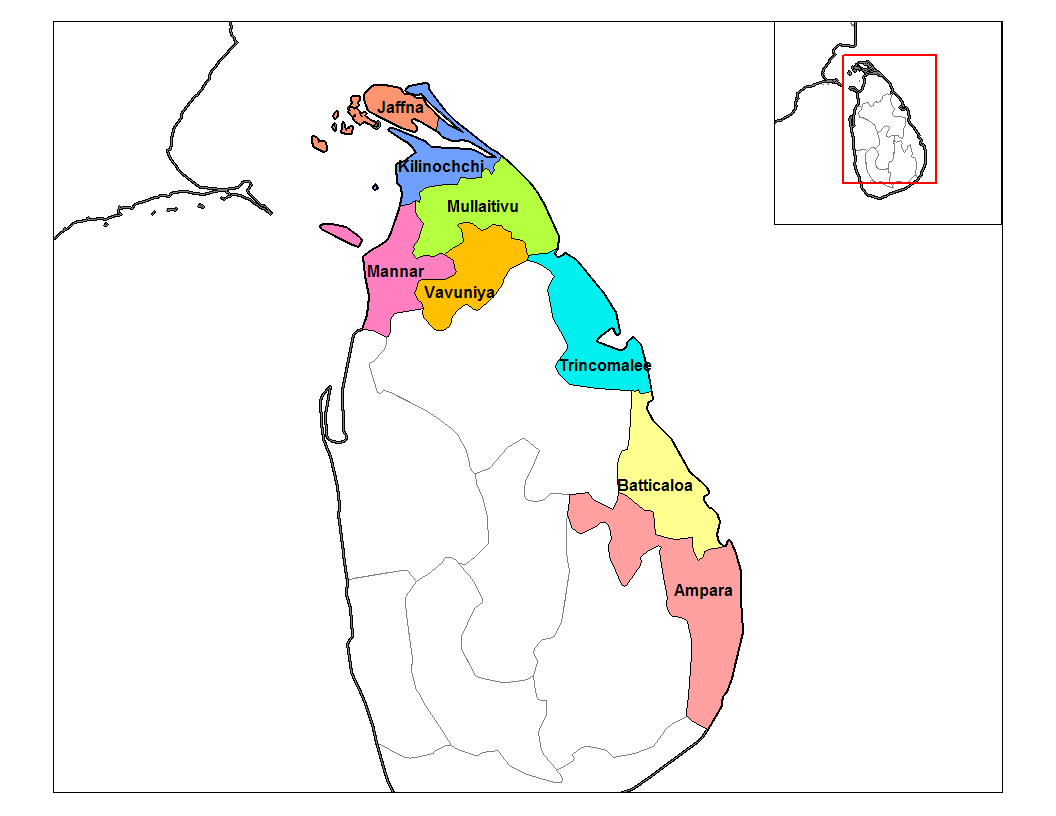
All of Sri Lanka's campaign medals (as at December 2020) center around those that were part of the Sri Lankan Civil War. As such, the campaigns took place in the North and East of the island, shown here

- Eastern Humanitarian Operations Medal
- Northern Humanitarian Operations Medal
- Purna Bhumi Padakkama
- North and East Operations Medal
- Vadamarachchi Operation Medal
- Riviresa Campaign Services Medal

== Peacetime service medals ==
- Sewabhimani Padakkama (Meritorious Service Medal)
- Sewa Padakkama (Service medal)

== Commemorative medals ==
- Ceylon Armed Services Inauguration Medal - 1951
- Queen Elizabeth II Coronation Medal - 1953
- Republic of Sri Lanka Armed Services Medal - 1972
- Sri Lanka Army 25th Anniversary Medal - 1974
- Sri Lanka Navy 25th Anniversary Medal - 1975
- Sri Lanka Air Force 25th Anniversary Medal - 1976
- President's Inauguration Medal - 1978
- Sri Lanka Army Volunteer Force Centenary Medal - 1981 (Sri Lanka Army Volunteer Force)
- 50th Independence Anniversary Commemoration Medal - 1998
- Sri Lanka Army 50th Anniversary Medal - 1999
- Sri Lanka Navy 50th Anniversary Medal - 2000
- Sri Lanka Air Force 50th Anniversary Medal - 2001
- 75th Independence Day Commemoration Medal - 2023
- Sri Lanka Army 75th Anniversary Medal - 2024
- Sri Lanka Navy 75th Anniversary Medal - 2025
- Sri Lanka Air Force 75th Anniversary Medal - 2026

== United Nations Service Medals ==
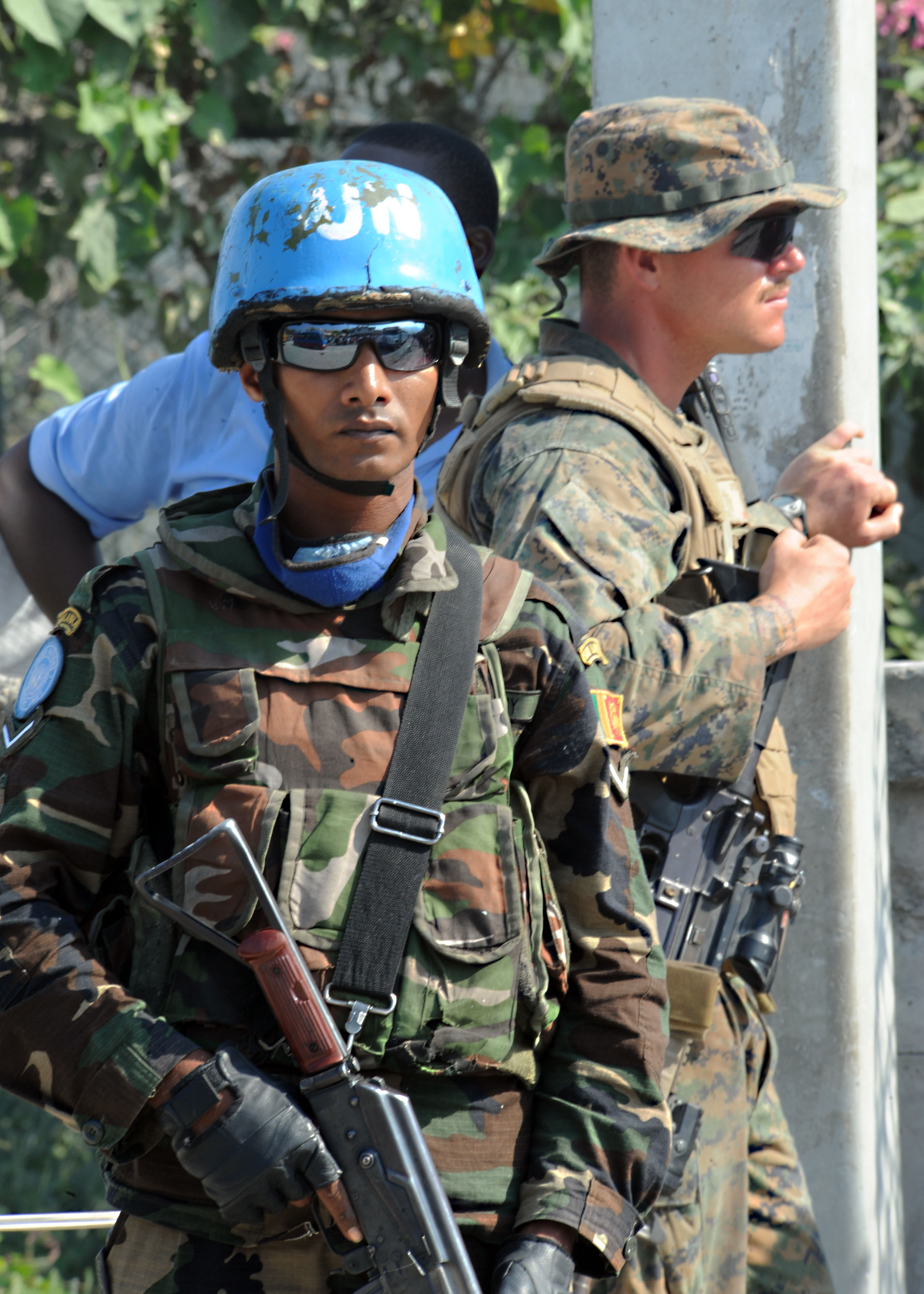
A Sri Lankan UN peacekeeper in Carrefour, Haiti in 2010

The United Nations Medal for participation in UN peacekeeping operations:

- United Nations Operation in the Congo (MONUC) - 1960
- United Nations Security Force in West New Guinea - October 1962 to April 1963
- United Nations India-Pakistan Observation Mission - 1965, 1966
- United Nations Military Observer Group in India and Pakistan
- United Nations Operation in Mozambique - 1992 to 1994
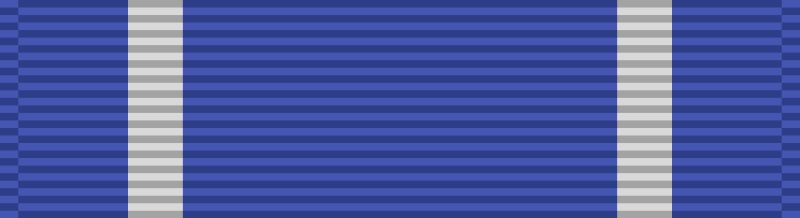
- United Nations Truce Supervision Organization
- United Nations Stabilization Mission in Haiti - since 2004
- United Nations Interim Force in Lebanon - since 2010
- United Nations Multidimensional Integrated Stabilization Mission in the Central African Republic (MINUSCA) - since 2014
- United Nations Mission in South Sudan - since 2015
- United Nations Multidimensional Integrated Stabilization Mission in Mali (MINUSMA) - since December 2017
- United Nations Mission for Justice Support in Haiti - since 2017
- United Nations Interim Security Force for Abyei (UNIFSA)
- United Nations Mission for the Referendum in Western Sahara (MINUSRO)

== Former decorations and medals ==
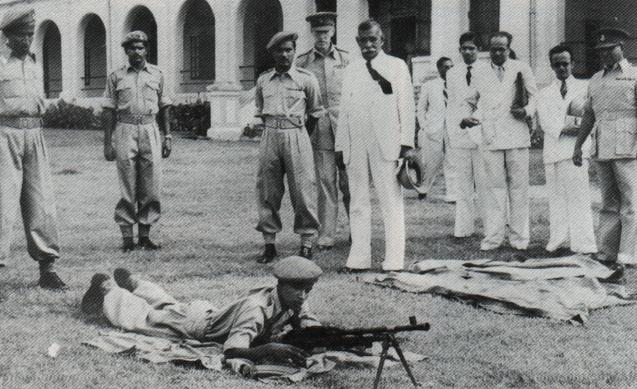
Sri Lanka, formerly known as Ceylon, possessed a small standing armed force of its own. Here, Prime Minister D. S. Senanayake watches the Ceylon Light Infantry training at the Echelon Barracks in the 1950s

=== Dominion of Ceylon (1949 - 1972) ===
From its formation in 1949, the Ceylon Armed Forces continued the use of British military decorations. This was discontinued in 1956 with a suspension of nominations for British honours; until Sri Lanka's republican constitution of 1972, the following awards were used:

- Officer of the Order of the British Empire (Military Division) (suspended in 1956)
- Member of the Order of the British Empire (Military Division) (suspended in 1956)
- Efficiency Decoration (Ceylon) (1930 - 1972)
- Efficiency Medal (Ceylon) (1930 - 1972)
- Decoration for Officers of the Royal Naval Volunteer Reserve (1938-1950)
- Royal Naval Volunteer Reserve Long Service and Good Conduct Medal (1938-1950)
- Queen's Medal for Champion Shots in the Military Forces (1954-1966)
- Ceylon Armed Services Long Service Medal (1961 - 1972)
- General Service Medal (Malaya Clasp) (1949 to Ceylon Pioneers)

=== Colonial (pre-1948) ===
Imperial and local medals awarded for military service to the colony and empire.

- Capture of Ceylon Medal (1807)
- Ceylon Medal (1818)
- Volunteer Officers' Decoration (1892-1930)
- Volunteer Long Service Medal for India and the Colonies (1892-1930)
- Queen's South Africa Medal (1989-1900 for service with the British Imperial Forces)
- King Edward VII Coronation Medal (1902)
- King George V Coronation Medal (1911)
- British War Medal (1914-1918 for service with the British Army)
- Victory Medal (1914-1918 for service with the British Army)
- Ceylon Volunteer Service Medal (1914-1919)
- King George V Silver Jubilee Medal (1935)
- King George VI Coronation Medal (1937)
- War Medal 1939–1945 (1939-1945)
- Defence Medal (1939-1945)
- Burma Star (1939-1945 for service with the British Army)
- Africa Star (1939-1945 for service with the Royal Army Service Corps)
- 1939-1945 Star (1939-1945 for service with the Royal Air Force)
- Air Crew Europe Star (1939-1945 for service with the Royal Air Force)

== Order of precedence ==
The various decorations and medals are worn in the order stipulated for each service by its service commander.

=== Sri Lanka Army ===
The order in which decorations and medals are to be worn have been defined in the Dress Regulation of the Sri Lanka Army.

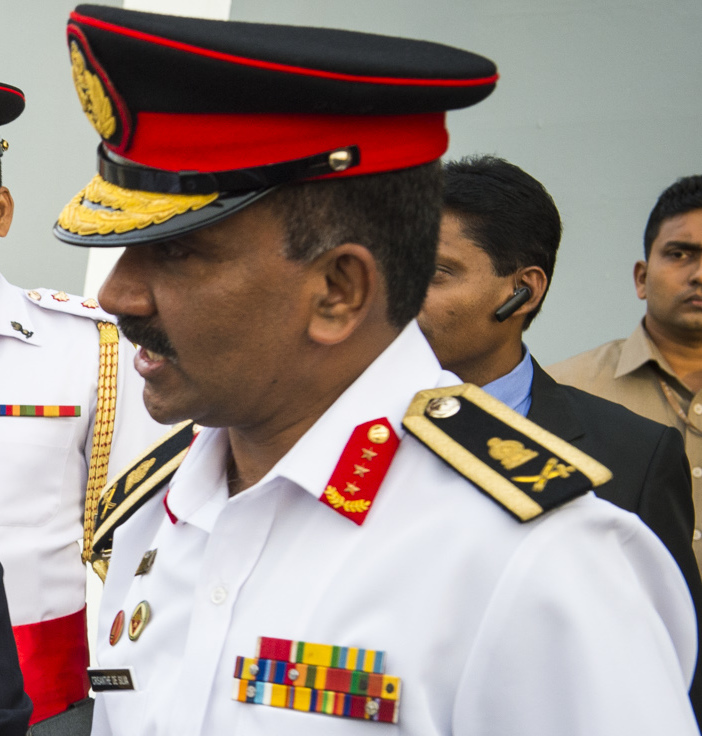
SLA officer displaying ribbon bars in order of precedence.

Ribbon	Award	Postnominals	Established
	Parama Weera Vibhushanaya	PWV	1981
	Weerodara Vibhushanaya	WV	1981
	Weera Wickrama Vibhushanaya	WWV	1981
	Rana Wickrama Padakkama	RWP	1981
	Rana Sura Padakkama	RSP	1981
	Vishista Seva Vibhushanaya	VSV	1981
	Karyakshama Seva Vibhushanaya (Note: Equivalent) (Sri Lanka Army Volunteer Force)	KSV	1972
	Uththama Seva Padakkama	USP	1981
	Karyakshama Seva Padakkama (Sri Lanka Army Volunteer Force)	KSP	1972
	Desha Puthra Sammanaya	-	1972
	Eastern Humanitarian Operations Medal	-	2010
	Northern Humanitarian Operations Medal	-	2010
	Purna Bhumi Padakkama	-	1977
	North and East Operations Medal	-	1983
	Vadamarachchi Operation Medal	-	1983
	Riviresa Campaign Services Medal	-	1996
	Queen’s Medal for Best Shooter in the Army	-	1954
	Republic of Sri Lanka Armed Services Medal	-	1972
	Queen Elizabeth II Coronation Medal	-	1953
	Sri Lanka Army 25th Anniversary Medal	-	1974
	50th Independence Anniversary Commemoration Medal	-	1998
	75th Independence Day Commemoration Medal	-	2023
	Sri Lanka Army 50th Anniversary Medal	-	1999
	Ceylon Armed Services Long Service Medal (Replaced by the Sri Lanka Armed Services Long Service Medal)	-	1968
	Sri Lanka Armed Services Long Service Medal	-	1979
	President's Inauguration Medal	-	1978
	Ceylon Armed Services Inauguration Medal	-	1955
	Sri Lanka Army Volunteer Force Centenary Medal	-	1981
	Sewabhimani Padakkama	-	2019
	Sewa Padakkama	-	2019
	Videsha Seva Padakkama	-	1981
	United Nations Medals	-	Various

=== Sri Lanka Navy ===
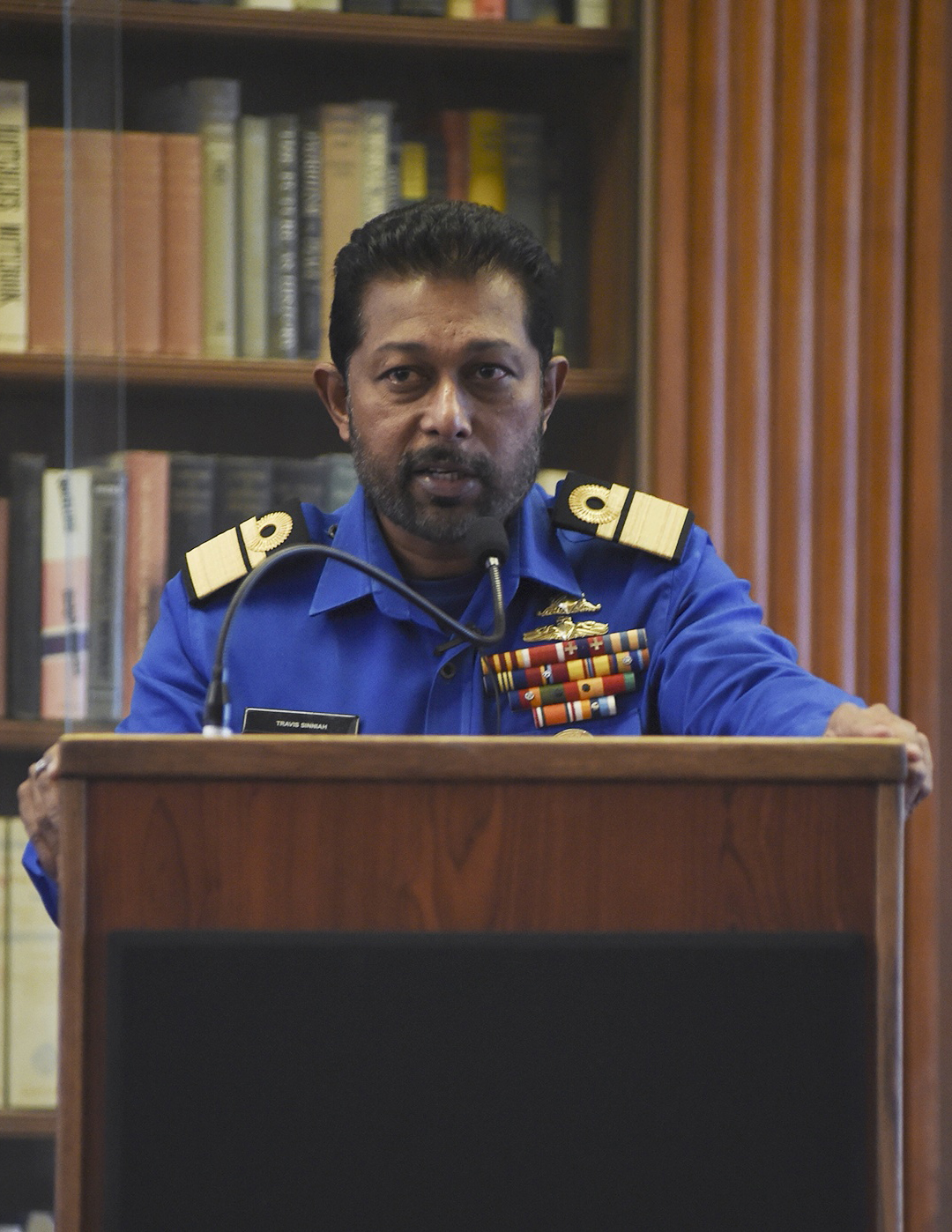
SLN officer displaying ribbon bars in order of precedence.

Ribbon	Award	Postnominals	Established
	Parama Weera Vibhushanaya	PWV	1981
	Weerodara Vibhushanaya	WV	1981
	Weera Wickrama Vibhushanaya	WWV	1981
	Rana Wickrama Padakkama	RWP	1981
	Rana Sura Padakkama	RSP	1981
	Vishista Seva Vibhushanaya	VSV	1981
	Uththama Seva Padakkama	USP	1981
	Videsha Seva Padakkama	-	1981
	Republic of Sri Lanka Armed Services Medal	-	1972
	Sri Lanka Navy 50th Anniversary Medal	-	2000
	Sri Lanka Navy 25th Anniversary Medal	-	1975
	Ceylon Armed Services Long Service Medal (Replaced by the Sri Lanka Armed Services Long Service Medal)	-	1968
	Sri Lanka Armed Services Long Service Medal	-	1979
	Queen Elizabeth II Coronation Medal	-	1953
	President's Inauguration Medal	-	1978
	50th Independence Anniversary Commemoration Medal	-	1998
	75th Independence Day Commemoration Medal	-	2023
	Desha Puthra Sammanaya	-	1972
	Sewabhimani Padakkama	-	2019
	Sewa Padakkama	-	2019
	Eastern Humanitarian Operations Medal	-	2010
	Northern Humanitarian Operations Medal	-	2010
	Purna Bhumi Padakkama	-	1977
	North and East Operations Medal	-	1983
	Vadamarachchi Operation Medal	-	1983
	Riviresa Campaign Services Medal	-	1996
	Prashansaniya Seva Vibhushanaya (Sri Lanka Volunteer Naval Force)	PSV	2000
	Prashansaniya Seva Padakkama (Sri Lanka Volunteer Naval Force)	PSP	2000
	Ceylon Armed Services Inauguration Medal	-	1955

=== Sri Lanka Air Force ===
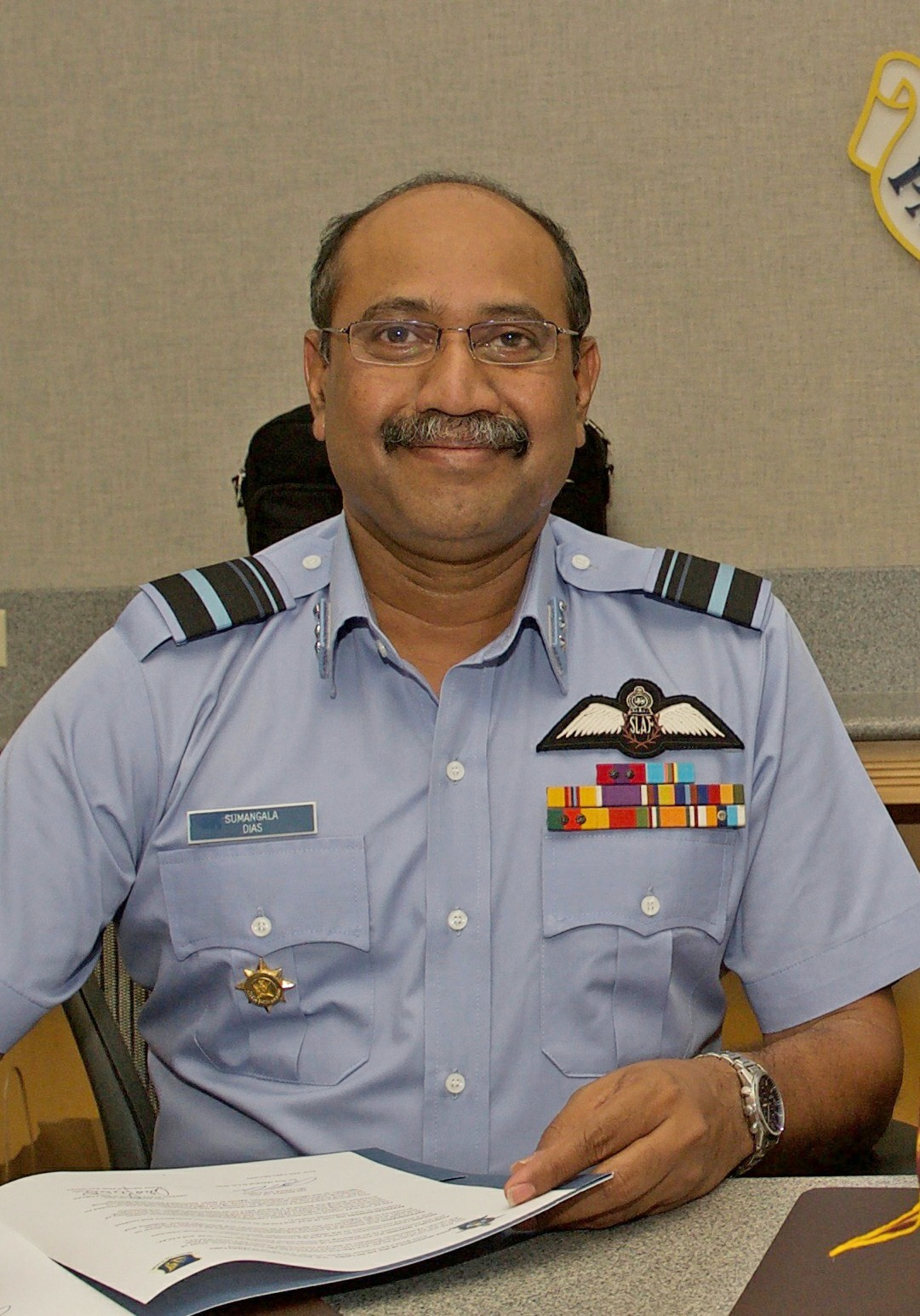
SLAF officer displaying ribbon bars in order of precedence.

Ribbon	Award	Postnominals	Established
	Parama Weera Vibhushanaya	PWV	1981
	Weerodara Vibhushanaya	WV	1981
	Weera Wickrama Vibhushanaya	WWV	1981
	Rana Wickrama Padakkama	RWP	1981
	Rana Sura Padakkama	RSP	1981
	Vishista Seva Vibhushanaya	VSV	1981
	Uththama Seva Padakkama	USP	1981
	Videsha Seva Padakkama	-	1981
	Republic of Sri Lanka Armed Services Medal	-	1972
	Sri Lanka Air Force 25th Anniversary Medal	-	1976
	Sri Lanka Air Force 50th Anniversary Medal	-	2001
	Queen Elizabeth II Coronation Medal	-	1953
	Ceylon Armed Services Long Service Medal (Replaced by the Sri Lanka Armed Services Long Service Medal)	-	1968
	Sri Lanka Armed Services Long Service Medal	-	1979
	President's Inauguration Medal	-	1978
	50th Independence Anniversary Commemoration Medal	-	1998
	75th Independence Day Commemoration Medal	-	2023
	Desha Puthra Sammanaya	-	1972
	Sewabhimani Padakkama	-	2019
	Sewa Padakkama	-	2019
	Eastern Humanitarian Operations Medal	-	2010
	Northern Humanitarian Operations Medal	-	2010
	Purna Bhumi Padakkama	-	1977
	North and East Operations Medal	-	1983
	Vadamarachchi Operation Medal	-	1983
	Riviresa Campaign Services Medal	-	1996
	Ceylon Armed Services Inauguration Medal	-	1955
	United Nations Medals	-	Various

== See also ==
- Sri Lankan campaign medals
- Awards and decorations of the Sri Lanka Police
- Orders, decorations, and medals of Sri Lanka
