= Shavendra Silva =

Sri Lanka Army general

General Shavendra Silva WWV, RWP, RSP, VSV, USP
- Born: 22 June 1964 (age 62); Matale, Sri Lanka
- Spouse: Sujeewa Nelson
- Children: Two (daughters)
- Military career
- Allegiance: Sri Lanka
- Branch: Sri Lanka Army
- Service years: 1985 – 2025
- Rank: General
- Unit: Gajaba Regiment
- Commands: Chief of Defence Staff; Commander of the Army; Chief of Staff of the Army; Adjutant General; 58 Division
- Conflicts: Eelam War IV; Sri Lankan Civil War; 1987–1989 JVP insurrection Www
- Awards: Weera Wickrama Vibhushanaya; Rana Wickrama Padakkama; Rana Sura Padakkama; Vishista Seva Vibhushanaya; Uttama Seva Padakkama; Desha Putra Sammanaya

General L H Shavendra C Silva, WWV, RWP, RSP, VSV, USP (Sinhala: ශවේන්ද්‍ර සිල්වා, Tamil: ஷவேந்திர சில்வா) is a retired Sri Lanka Army officer who served as Chief of Defence Staff, the head of the Sri Lanka Armed Forces from 1 January 2020 to 31 December 2024. He also served as the Commander of the Sri Lanka Army from 19 August 2019 to 31 May 2022. His other important appointments include, Chief of Staff of the army, Adjutant General and Director of Operations of the Army. During the Sri Lankan civil war he gained fame as the General Officer Commanding of the elite 58 Division. He had also served as the Deputy Permanent Representative to the United Nations Headquarters.

== Early life and education ==
Shavendra Silva was born on 22 June 1964 in Matale, the son of Creasy de Silva, former Chairman, Sri Lanka Transport Board and Sumana Bandu Silva, an English teacher. He had three siblings that included Lakshman de Silva who became CEO of the DFCC Bank and Ajantha de Silva, who is a retired Air Vice-Marshal. He was educated at Vijaya College, Matale; St Thomas' College, Matale and St Joseph's College, Anuradhapura. He became the head prefect, captained the first XI cricket team, was a sergeant of the cadet platoon and became the band leader of the western band.

== Early military career ==
He joined the Sri Lanka Army on 5 March 1984 through its 19th Officer Cadet Intake (long course) at the Sri Lanka Military Academy in Diyatalawa. On completion of his basic officer training, he was commissioned as a Second Lieutenant in the Gajaba Regiment on 16 November 1985 as one of the first officers to be commissioned directly into the newly formed infantry regiment under the command of Lieutenant Colonel Vijaya Wimalaratne. Attached to the 1st Battalion, Gajaba Regiment (1st Gajaba), he was made platoon commander in the Special Service Group that later developed into the Rapid Deployment Force a precursor to the Special Forces Regiment. He later transferred to the Commando Regiment following commando training. In 1987, he took part in the Operation Liberation in Vadamarachi as the adjutant of the 1st Gajaba under the command of Major Gotabaya Rajapaksa. He was wounded in the operation and later served as the head of the Presidential Security Army Unit at the President's House, Colombo. In 1989, Captain Silva served as a company commander in the 1st Gajaba under the command of Lieutenant Colonel Gotabaya Rajapaksa when it was deployed to the Matale District at the height of the 1987–1989 JVP insurrection undertaking counter insurgency operations in the district. He was thereafter an officer instructor at the Sri Lanka Military Academy and served as the course officer of regular intake 37, which included the first batch of foreign officer cadets in 1991.

== Field command and staff appointments ==
Major Silva was appointed commanding officer of the 8th battalion, Gajaba Regiment in August 1995 and served till January 1996. He was the youngest commanding officer to command an infantry battalion, during the Operation Riviresa. In July 1996, he was appointed commanding officer of the 5th (Volunteer) battalion, Gajaba Regiment and served till September 1996, when he was appointed commanding officer of the 1st battalion, Gajaba Regiment and served till September 1998 having been promoted to Lieutenant Colonel.

Having graduated from Defence Services Command and Staff College gaining his psc qualification, he had served as a staff officer in the Military Secretary's Branch at Army Headquarters and as a general staff officer-1 (G1) (Plans) in the Directorate of Plans; G1 (Training) Directorate of Training and G1 (Operations) at the Security Forces Headquarters – Jaffna. During 2002–2004 peace talks he took part in negotiations to open the A-9 Main Supply Route (MSR). In 2005, he was transferred to the Sri Lanka Military Academy as the commanding officer of the officer cadet wing.

== Eelam War IV ==
With the resumption of hostilities he became the Brigade Commander of the Air Mobile Brigade, in August 2006 he was instrumental in the capture of the forward defense lines in Muhamalai. Thereafter, he took command of the 58 Division, playing a key role in the military capturing several former LTTE strongholds including the Mannar Rice Bowl, Vedithalathivu, Nachchikuda, Mulangavil, Devils Point, Pooneryn, Kilinochchi, Paranthan, Elephant Pass, Dharmapuram, Vishvamadu, Suvandipuram, Thevipuram Puthukudirippu, Puthumathalan, Wellamullu vaikkal and the last stretch of LTTE held Karayamulli vaikkal in the mangroves of Nanthikandal lagoon in the Mullaithivu district. After the end of the war he was appointed as Director of Operations at Army Headquarters and promoted to the rank of Major General, the youngest officer to reach that rank. He then served as the General Officer Commanding, 53 Division which served as the country's Reserve Strike Force.

== United Nations ==
In 2010, he took up position as Sri Lanka Deputy Permanent Representative to the United Nations Headquarters with the rank of Ambassador in 2010, serving till December 2014. At the time he was the only serving army officer to hold such a diplomatic post. He was also the alternative representative of Sri Lanka to the Special Committee on Decolonization from 2010 to 2015 and served as an advisor of the Sri Lankan delegation to the United Nations General Assembly Third Committee. He led initiatives to increase Sri Lankan contribution to United Nations Peacekeeping operations, including the deployment of air units of the Sri Lanka Air Force and a military hospital for the United Nations Missions in Central African Republic and South Sudan. He attended a course on National and International Security at the Harvard University and had undergone psychological operations training in the US. He had served as a visiting lecturer at the Marine Corps War College in Quantico.

== Higher command ==
In 2015, Silva attended the National Security and Strategic Study course at the National Defence College.

On his return from India in 2016, he was appointed Adjutant General (AG) of Sri Lanka Army in the General Staff at Army Headquarters. In January 2019, he was appointed Chief of Staff of the army.

== Commander of Sri Lanka Army ==
On 21 August 2019, he was appointed Commander of Sri Lanka Army and promoted to the rank of Lieutenant General by President Maithripala Sirisena, succeeding General Mahesh Senanayake. He became the first officer of the Gajaba Regiment to take command of the army. He is the Regimental Colonel of the Gajaba Regiment and the Sri Lanka Army Special Forces Regiment and was the Regimental Colonel of the Commando Regiment. His term as Army Commander ended on 31 May 2022 succeeded by Lt. Gen. Vikum Liyanage.

== Chief of Defence Staff ==
In January 2020, General Silva was appointed Acting Chief of Defence Staff, while concurrently serving as Army Commander. He succeeded Admiral Ravindra Wijegunaratne. He was promoted to the rank of General in December 2020. With his term as Army Commander ending on 31 May 2022, General Silva was confirmed as Chief of Defence Staff with effect from 1 June 2022.

=== Allegations of human rights violations and sanctions ===
On 14 February 2020, The United States State Department imposed sanctions in the form of a travel ban preventing General Silva and his family from entering the United States having found him accountable through command responsibility for what it stated as "gross violations of human rights, namely extrajudicial killings, by the 58th division of the Sri Lanka army" at the final stages of the war against the LTTE in 2009, when up to 70,000 Tamil civilians were killed. The Government of Sri Lanka has strongly opposed the measure.

Following submissions by International Truth and Justice Project, in March 2025, the Government of the United Kingdom imposed travel sanctions, former Commander of the Army Shavendra Silva and Jagath Jayasuriya, former Commander of the Navy Wasantha Karannagoda and ex-LTTE Vinayagamoorthy Muralitharan, aka Karuna Amman as part of what the Foreign office called "UK travel bans and asset freezes, target individuals responsible for a range of violations and abuses, such as extrajudicial killings, during the civil war". The Ministry of Foreign Affairs said that this was a unilateral action taken by the UK government and such action does not assist but serve to complicate the national reconciliation process underway in Sri Lanka and went on to say human rights violations in the past need to handle by domestic accountability mechanisms. The Wartime President Mahinda Rajapaksa rejected UK governments allegations of human rights violations, stating "We waged war only against the LTTE and not against the Tamil people".

=== National Operation Centre for Prevention of COVID 19 Outbreak ===
With the outbreak of the COVID-19 pandemic, Lieutenant General Shavendra Silva was appointed by President Gotabaya Rajapaksa to head the National Operation Centre for Prevention of COVID-19 Outbreak (NOCPCO) a Presidential Task Force tasked with containing the COVID-19 pandemic in Sri Lanka.

== Awards and decorations ==
General Shavendra Silva is the most decorated soldier in Sri Lankan army history with over 20 medals to his name. He has received some of the highest awards in the Sri Lankan armed forces, which include the Weera Wickrama Vibhushanaya, Rana Wickrama Padakkama, Uttama Seva Padakkama and the Rana Sura Padakkama at once, a first in the Sri Lankan military history.

| Weera Wickrama Vibhushanaya (with bar) | Rana Wickrama Padakkama | Rana Sura Padakkama (with bar) | Vishista Seva Vibhushanaya |
| Uttama Seva Padakkama | Desha Putra Sammanaya | Eastern Humanitarian Operations Medal (with clasp) | Northern Humanitarian Operations Medal (with clasp) |
| Purna Bhumi Padakkama | North and East Operations Medal | Vadamarachchi Operation Medal | Riviresa Campaign Services Medal (with clasp) |
| 50th Independence Anniversary Commemoration Medal | Sri Lanka Army 50th Anniversary Medal | 75th Independence Day Commemoration Medal | Sri Lanka Armed Services Long Service Medal |
| Sewabhimani Padakkama | Sewa Padakkama | Videsha Seva Padakkama | United Nations Medal (MINUSTAH) |

His badges include: Commando Tab, the Infantry Badge, Air Mobile Brigade Training School Badge, Advance PTI (Officer) Badge, Parachute Badge, Air Assault Badge, Tracker Badge and the Qualified in Command and Staff Course Badge

== Recognition from Civil Society ==
In recognition of the services rendered to the Nation and the devotion to preserve the sovereignty and the territorial integrity of the motherland, he has been awarded with the 'Sri Lankeshwara Aparadha Meheyum Visharadha Jothikadhaja Veeraprathapa Deshamanya Jathika Gourawanama Sammana Upadhi Sannas Pathraya', the 'Weera Gajendra Sangramashuri Jathika Gourawanama Sannas Pathraya' and the 'Weera Wickrama Deshabhimani Vishwa Keerthi Sri Ranashura' which is the most prestigious awards that a lay-person could receive by the tri-sects of the Sri Lankan Buddhist order for true. Also, in 2019 he was honoured with the 'Vishwakeerthi Sri Mahathala Weera Puthra' honorary title. At the pinnacle General Shavendra Silva was awarded many honorary titles from the venerated Buddhist Tri-Nikaya, and in pinnacle he has been awarded with Buddhist Honorary Title 'Mahamannya Prathapadhikeshwara'; the highest Buddhist accolade that is bestowed to any lay personality by the Asgiriya and Malwatta Chapters of Siyam Nikaya in the year 2022.

== Contribution to the Sports Development ==
General Shavendra has been contributing to the advancement of the Sri Lankan Sports Sector as the Chairman of the National Sports Selection Committee (NSSC) appointed by the Ministry of Sports from the year 2018. He has been instrumental in uplifting the Sri Lankan Sports to perform well in Olympic Games and Paralympic Games during his service. Under his initiative, he has integrated the sports facilities of the Sri Lanka Army with the national sports to produce better results in the Field. In addition, he is the present Chairman of the Defence Services Hockey Committee & Army Hockey Committee.

== Personal life ==
General Silva is married to Sujeewa Nelson, daughter of H. G. P. Nelson, former Cabinet Minister of the United National Party.

== Retirement ==
Silva retired from the army on 1 January 2025.

== See also ==
- St. Thomas' College, Matale
- Sri Lankan Non Career Diplomats
- Eelam War IV
- Sri Lankan civil war

Military offices
| Preceded by Ravindra Wijegunaratne | Chief of the Defence Staff; June 2022 - Present | Incumbent |
| Preceded by Mahesh Senanayake | Commander of the Army; August 2019 - May 2022 | Succeeded by Vikum Liyanage |
| Preceded by Dampath Fernando | Chief of Staff of the Army; July 2017 - August 2019 | Succeeded by Sathyapriya Liyanage |
