= Nilantha Premaratne =

Commander of the Sri Lanka Army since 2026

Lieutenant General Nilantha Premaratne RSP VSV USP
- Education: University of Kelaniya; Naval Postgraduate School; Sri Lanka Military Academy; St. Servatius' College
- Spouse: Vindya Premaratne
- Children: 2
- Military career
- Allegiance: Sri Lanka
- Branch: Sri Lanka Army
- Service years: 1990–present
- Rank: Lieutenant General
- Unit: Sri Lanka Artillery
- Commands: Commander of the Army; Chief of Staff of the Army; Deputy Chief of Staff of the Army; Commandant, Sri Lanka Army Volunteer Force; Commander, Security Forces (East); General Officer Commanding, 23 Infantry Division; Commander, 551 Infantry Brigade; Commanding Officer, 16th Regiment, Sri Lanka Artillery; Battery Commander, 6th Field Regiment, Sri Lanka Artillery
- Awards: Rana Sura Padakkama (2); Vishista Seva Vibhushanaya; Uttama Seva Padakkama

Lieutenant General K. V. Nilantha P. Premaratne, RSP & bar, VSV, USP is a Sri Lankan army officer who has served as the 26th Commander of the Army since 1 August 2026. He also served as the 69th Chief of Staff. His command includes battery commander of the 6th filed regiment, Sri Lanka Artillery. Second in command 16th regiment, Sri Lanka Artillery. Commander 551 infantry brigade. General officer commanding 23rd infantry division. Commander security force-east. Commandment Sri Lanka Army volunteer force.

== Career ==
Premaratne is an alumnus of St. Servatius' College, Matara. He joined the Sri Lanka Army as an officer cadet of the Regular Intake 34 on 14 July 1990, completed his basic training at the Sri Lanka Military Academy in Diyatalawa, and was commissioned as a second lieutenant on 6 June 1992.

Premaratne has represented Sri Lanka in international military undertakings, serving as a United Nations Military Observer (UNMO) with the United Nations Mission for the Referendum in Western Sahara (MINURSO).

He holds a Master of Arts degree in Security Studies (Counterterrorism: Policy and Strategies) from the Naval Postgraduate School, Monterey, California, United States, and a Master of Defence Studies degree from the University of Kelaniya.

Premaratne was appointed the 69th Chief of Staff of the Sri Lanka Army on 1 June 2026 and served in that role until 1 August.

== Commander of the Army ==
On 31 July 2026, Premaratne was appointed the 26th Commander of Sri Lanka Army with effect from 1 August 2026 by President Anura Kumara Dissanayake, and was promoted to the rank of lieutenant general. He succeeded General Lasantha Rodrigo who retired on 31 July.

== Personal life ==
Premaratne is married to Vindya Premaratne and they have two children.

== Awards and decorations ==

Rana Sura Padakkama (with two bars)	Vishista Seva Vibhushanaya	Uttama Seva Padakkama	Eastern Humanitarian Operations Medal
Northern Humanitarian Operations Medal	Purna Bhumi Padakkama	North and East Operations Medal	Riviresa Campaign Services Medal
50th Independence Anniversary Commemoration Medal	75th Independence Day Commemoration Medal	Sri Lanka Army 50th Anniversary Medal	Sri Lanka Armed Services Long Service Medal
Sewabhimani Padakkama	Sewa Padakkama	Videsha Seva Padakkama	

== See also ==
- Ministry of Defence
- Sri Lanka Armed Forces
- Sri Lanka Navy
- Sri Lanka Air Force

== Notes ==
- "Commander of the Army: Lieutenant General Nilantha Premaratne RSP USP nps psc". Sri Lanka Army. Archived from the original on 1 August 2026.

Military offices
Preceded by Lasantha Rodrigo	Commander of the Army; 2026–present	Succeeded by incumbent
