= Damian C. Fernando =

Commander of the Sri Lanka Navy since 2026

Vice Admiral Damian Fernando RSP VSV USP

27th Commander of the Navy
- Incumbent
- Assumed office 1 July 2026
- President: Anura Kumara Dissanayake
- Preceded by: Kanchana Banagoda

Chief of Staff of the Navy
- In office 31 December 2024 – 1 July 2026
- Commander of the Navy: Kanchana Banagoda
- Preceded by: Kanchana Banagoda

Personal details
- Born: K. D. Damian C. Fernando
- Spouse: Kaushalya Opatha Fernando
- Children: 3
- Education: Naval War College; Bandaranaike International Diplomatic Training Institute; Nautical Institute; Asia-Pacific Center for Security Studies; King's College London (MA); General Sir John Kotelawala Defence University (MSc); Royal College of Defence Studies; INS Dronacharya; Naval and Maritime Academy
- Alma mater: Joseph Vaz College

Military service
- Allegiance: Sri Lanka
- Branch/service: Sri Lanka Navy
- Years of service: 1991–present
- Rank: Vice Admiral
- Commands: Commander, Eastern Naval Area; Commander, North Central Naval Area; Director General Personnel at Naval Headquarters; Commandant, Naval and Maritime Academy; Commander, 4th Fast Attack Craft Flotilla
- Battles/wars: Sri Lankan Civil War
- Awards: Rana Sura Padakkama; Vishista Seva Vibhushanaya; Uttama Seva Padakkama

Vice Admiral K. D. Damian C. Fernando, RSP, VSV, USP, is a Sri Lankan naval officer who has served as the 27th Commander of the Navy since 1 July 2026.

== Naval career ==
Fernando is an alumnus of Joseph Vaz College, Wennappuwa. He joined the Sri Lanka Navy as an officer cadet of the 21st Intake on 12 September 1991, completed his basic training at the Naval and Maritime Academy in Trincomalee, and was commissioned as an acting sub lieutenant on 12 September 1993.

He is a graduate of Royal College of Defence Studies, earning the post-nominal letters rcds. He holds an MSc in Management (Defence Studies) from General Sir John Kotelawala Defence University and an MA in International Security and Strategy from King's College London.

He has also received training and gained specialisation at several institutions, including gunnery and missiles at INS Dronacharya; the Naval Gun Maintenance Engineer Course in China; alumnus of the Asia-Pacific Center for Security Studies in Honolulu, Hawaii, US; Associate Fellow (AFNI) at the Nautical Institute in London, UK; the Defence Attaché Course at the Bandaranaike International Diplomatic Training Institute; and the United States Navy's Flag Level Combined Force Maritime Component Commander Course, conducted by the Naval War College at Naval Station Newport in Newport, Rhode Island, US.

Fernando was appointed Chief of Staff of the Sri Lanka Navy on 31 December 2024 and served in that role until 1 July 2026.

=== Commander of the Navy ===
On 30 June 2026, Fernando was appointed the 27th Commander of Sri Lanka Navy with effect from 1 July 2026 by President Anura Kumara Dissanayake, and was promoted to the rank of vice admiral. He succeeded Admiral Kanchana Banagoda who retired on the same date.

== Personal life ==
Fernando is married to Kaushalya Opatha Fernando and they have three children.

== Awards and decorations ==

| Rana Sura Padakkama | Vishista Seva Vibhushanaya | Uththama Seva Padakkama | Sri Lanka Navy 50th Anniversary Medal |
| Sri Lanka Armed Services Long Service Medal | 50th Independence Anniversary Commemoration Medal | 75th Independence Day Commemoration Medal | Sewabhimani Padakkama |
| Sewa Padakkama | Eastern Humanitarian Operations Medal | Northern Humanitarian Operations Medal | Purna Bhumi Padakkama |
| | North and East Operations Medal | Riviresa Campaign Services Medal | |

== Notes ==
- "Biography: Vice Admiral Damian Fernando RSP, USP, rcds, MA in International Security & Strategy (UK), MSc (DS) Mgt, AFNI, JP (WI)". Sri Lanka Navy. 1 July 2026. Archived from the original on 3 July 2026.
