= Kanchana Banagoda =

Commander of the Sri Lanka Navy (2024–2026)

Admiral Kanchana Banagoda RSP USP
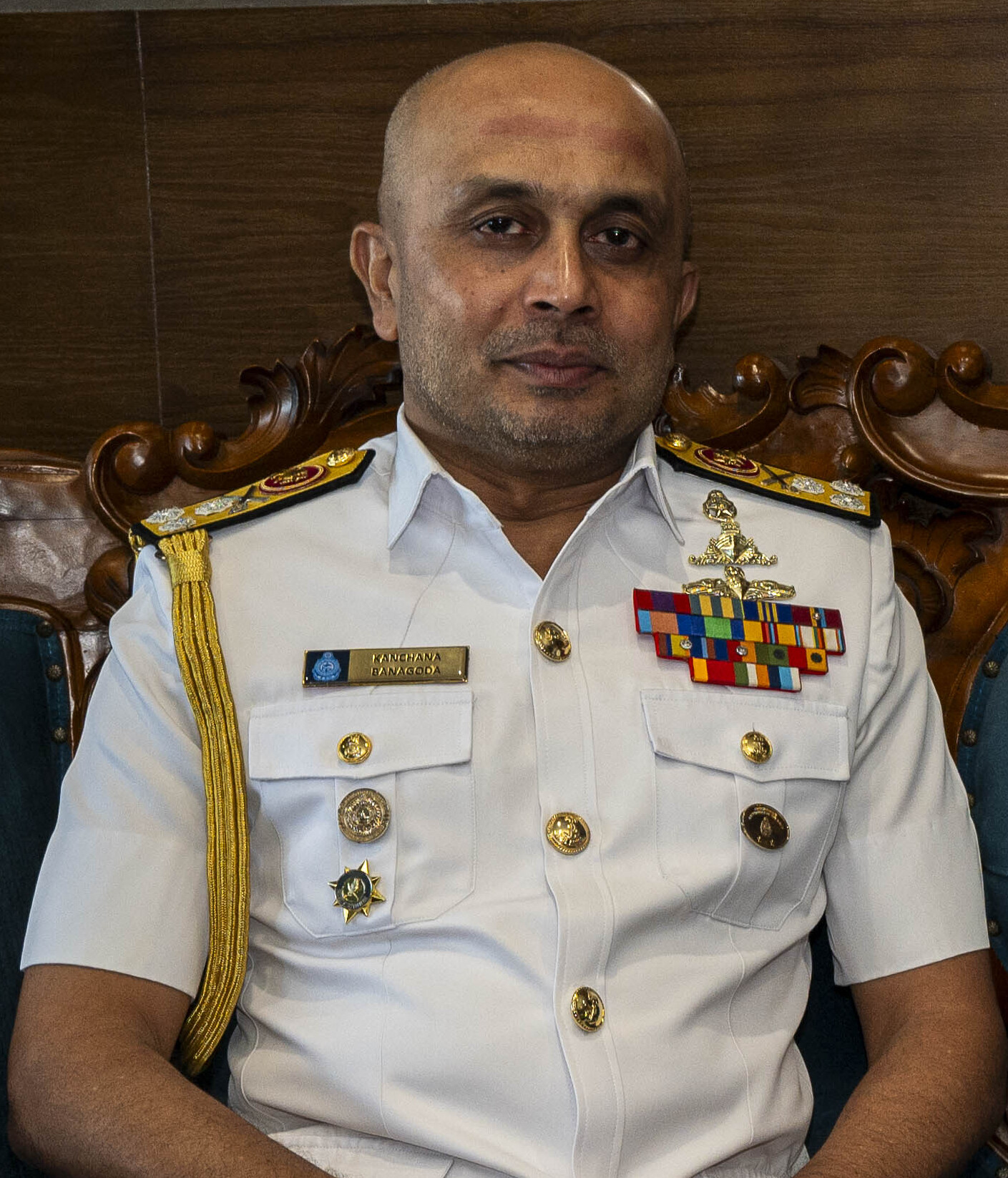
- Banagoda in 2025

26th Commander of the Navy
- In office 31 December 2024 – 1 July 2026
- President: Anura Kumara Dissanayake
- Preceded by: Priyantha Perera
- Succeeded by: Damian Fernando

Chief of Staff of the Navy
- In office 16 August 2024 – 31 August 2024
- Commander of the Navy: Priyantha Perera
- Preceded by: Pradeep Rathnayake
- Succeeded by: Damian Fernando

Personal details
- Spouse: Anusha Banagoda
- Education: University of Wollongong; Open University of Sri Lanka; Defence Services Command and Staff College; Britannia Royal Naval College; Naval and Maritime Academy; S. Thomas' College, Bandarawela

Military service
- Allegiance: Sri Lanka
- Branch/service: Sri Lanka Navy
- Years of service: 1989–2026
- Rank: Admiral
- Commands: Director Naval Training; Commander Southeastern Naval Area (SENA); Commander North Central Naval Area (NCNA); Commander Northern Naval Area (NNA)
- Battles/wars: Sri Lankan Civil War; Operation Yukthiya
- Awards: Rana Sura Padakkama; Uttama Seva Padakkama

Admiral Kanchana Banagoda, RSP, USP, is a Sri Lankan retired naval officer, who served as the 26th Commander of the Navy from 31 December 2024 till 1 July 2026.

== Naval career ==
Banagoda is an alumnus of Bandarawela Central College and S. Thomas' College, Bandarawela. He joined the Sri Lanka Navy on 15 September 1989 as an officer cadet in the 19th intake of the executive branch. After completing basic training at the Naval and Maritime Academy in Trincomalee, he attended Britannia Royal Naval College in Dartmouth, United Kingdom and was commissioned in 1991 as a Sub-lieutenant.

He completed the 'Sub Lieutenant Technical Course' at the Naval and Maritime Academy in 1994 and the Anti-Submarine Warfare (ASW) course at INS Venduruthy, Kochi, India, in 2000. He also completed a staff course at the Defence Services Command and Staff College (DSCSC) in Dhaka, Bangladesh.

Banagoda was appointed Chief of Staff of the Sri Lanka Navy on 16 August 2024 and served in that role until his appointment as Commander of the Sri Lanka Navy on 31 December 2024.

=== Commander of the Navy ===
Banagoda was promoted to the rank of vice admiral and appointed the 26th Commander of the Navy on 31 December 2026 by President Anura Kumara Dissanayake. He was promoted admiral on 30 June 2026 and retired from services with effect from 1 July 2026. Damian Fernando succeeded him as the 27th Commander of the Navy.

== Awards and decorations ==

Rana Sura Padakkama	Uththama Seva Padakkama	Sri Lanka Navy 50th Anniversary Medal	Sri Lanka Armed Services Long Service Medal
50th Independence Anniversary Commemoration Medal	75th Independence Day Commemoration Medal	Sewabhimani Padakkama	Sewa Padakkama
Eastern Humanitarian Operations Medal	Northern Humanitarian Operations Medal		Purna Bhumi Padakkama
	North and East Operations Medal	Riviresa Campaign Services Medal	

== Notes ==
- "Biography: Admiral Kanchana Banagoda, RSP, USP, ndc, psc". Sri Lanka Navy. Archived from the original on 30 June 2026.
