= Vikum Liyanage =

Sri Lankan general

General Vikum Liyanage විකුම් ලියනගේ RWP, RSP
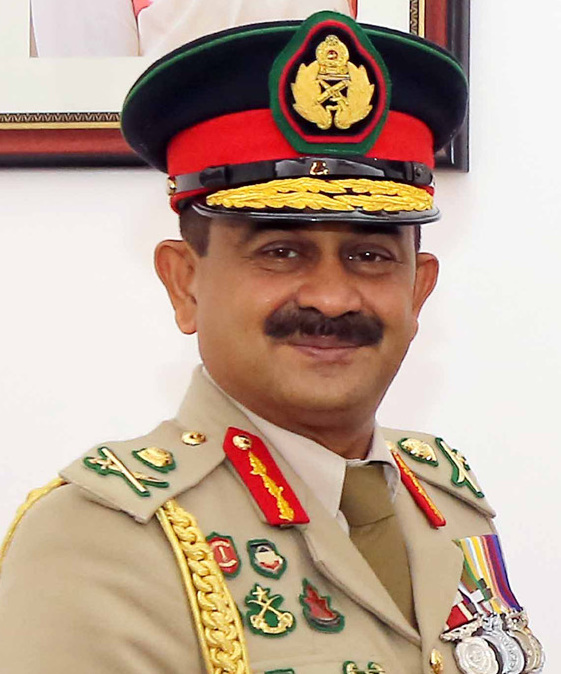
- Liyanage at New Delhi in December 2023
- Spouse: Janaki Liyanage
- Children: A daughter and a son.
- Military career
- Allegiance: Sri Lanka
- Branch: Sri Lanka Army
- Service years: 1987–2024
- Rank: General
- Unit: Gajaba Regiment
- Commands: Commander of the Army; Chief of Staff of the Army; Sri Lanka Army Volunteer Force; Security Forces Headquarters - West; Security Forces Headquarters - Central; 21 Division; 215 Brigade; 623 Brigade; 8 Gajaba Regiment
- Conflicts: Eelam War IV; Sri Lankan Civil War
- Awards: Rana Wickrama Padakkama; Rana Sura Padakkama; Desha Puthra Sammanaya

General H.L.V.M. Liyanage, widely known as Vikum Liyanage, is a retired Sri Lanka Army officer. He was the Commander of the Sri Lanka Army from 1 June 2022 to 31 December 2024. Prior to become the army commander, he was the 59th Chief of Staff of the Army. On 1 June 2022, Liyanage assumed as the 24th Commander of Sri Lanka Army. Earlier, he served as the Commandant, Sri Lanka Army Volunteer Force.

== Early life ==
Liyanage attended Vijaya College, Matale, where he was reported to excel in athletics and hockey, and was described as a bright student, earning accolades for his college.

== Military career ==
Liyanage as an Officer Cadet joined the Regular Force of the Sri Lanka Army on 27 October 1986 in the Regular Intake - 26 and followed basic military training at the prestigious Sri Lanka Military Academy at Diyatalawa and subsequently at the Pakistan Military Academy at Kakul. After successful completion of training, he was commissioned as a Second Lieutenant in the Gajaba Regiment of the Sri Lanka Army on 23 July 1987.

He served as the second-in-command of the 10 Gajaba Regiment; he was the commanding officer of 8 Gajaba Regiment. He served as the sector commander of Operations Command (Colombo), acting brigade commanders of 225 and 553 Infantry Brigades; he served as the brigade commanders of 215, 542, 224, 221 and 623 infantry brigades. He was the division commander of 21 Division and also the commanders of the Security Forces Headquarters - West and Security Forces Headquarters - Central and later he served as the commandant of the Sri Lanka Army Volunteer Force.

He has also served as director - psychological operations, director (doctrine and training) and director (operations and systems) in the Office of the Chief of Defence Staff (OCDS); adjutant - General Sir John Kotelawala Defence University, staff officer - 2 (admin) - regimental centre of the Gajaba Regiment and staff officer 2 - directorate of staff duties at the Army HQ.

== Personal life ==
Liyanage is a past pupil of Vijaya College, Matale. He is married to Janaki and the couple is blessed with a daughter and a son.

== Awards and decorations ==
He has received some of the highest awards in the Sri Lankan armed forces, which include the Rana Wickrama Padakkama and the Rana Sura Padakkama.

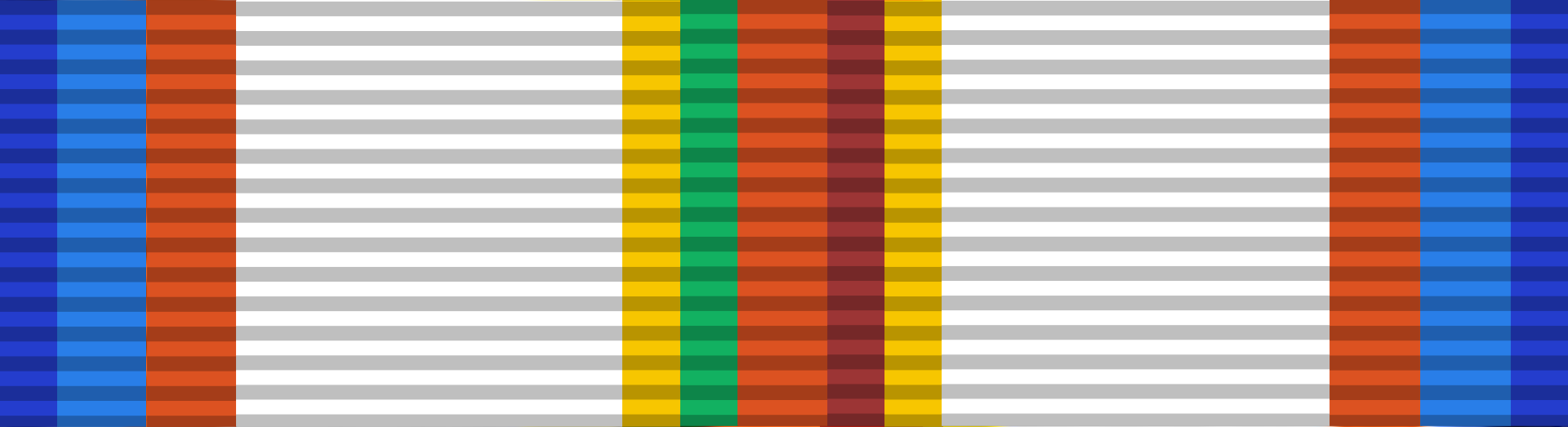

Rana Wickrama Padakkama (with two bars)	Rana Sura Padakkama (with bar)		
Desha Putra Sammanaya	Eastern Humanitarian Operations Medal (with clasp)	Northern Humanitarian Operations Medal (with clasp)	Purna Bhumi Padakkama
North and East Operations Medal (with clasp)	Riviresa Campaign Services Medal (with clasp)	50th Independence Anniversary Commemoration Medal	75th Independence Day Commemoration Medal
Sri Lanka Army 50th Anniversary Medal	Sri Lanka Armed Services Long Service Medal	Sewabhimani Padakkama	Sewa Padakkama

Military offices
Preceded by Shavendra Silva	Commander of the Army; 1 June 2022 - 31 Dec 2024	Succeeded by Lasantha Rodrigo
Preceded by Priyantha Perera	Chief of Staff of the Army; 7 December 2021 - 30 May 2022	Succeeded by Jagath Kodithuwakku
