= Lionel Balagalle =

Sri Lankan army general (1947–2023)

General Lionel P. Balagalle ලයනල් බලගල්ල RWP, RSP, VSV, USP, VSP
- Born: 15 June 1947; Colombo, British Ceylon
- Died: 26 October 2023 (aged 76); Army Hospital, Narahenpita, Colombo, Sri Lanka
- Military career
- Allegiance: Sri Lanka
- Branch: Sri Lanka Army
- Service years: 1967–2005
- Rank: General
- Unit: Sri Lanka Artillery
- Commands: Commander of the Sri Lankan Army
- Awards: Rana Wickrama Padakkama; Rana Sura Padakkama; Vishista Seva Vibhushanaya; Uttama Seva Padakkama

General Lionel Piyananda Balagalle, RWP, RSP, VSV, USP (15 June 1947 – 26 October 2023), was a senior Sri Lanka Army officer, who served as the Commander of the Sri Lanka Army and the Chief of the Defence Staff. He is known for formalising military intelligence operations within the Sri Lanka Army, having founded the Directorate of Military Intelligence and the Military Intelligence Corps.

== Early life and education ==
Born in Colombo, both Balagalle's parents were teachers. Having received his primary education in a rural school in Ratnapura, he attended Ananda College for his secondary education. He excelled in sports winning college colours. He was a senior school prefect and a cadet.

== Military career ==
=== Artillery officer ===
Balagalle studied medicine before he joined the Ceylon Army as an Officer Cadet on 5 April 1965. Receiving his basic training at the Army Training Centre, Diyatalawa, he was commissioned as a second lieutenant in the 4th Regiment, Ceylon Artillery on 5 April 1967 and was promoted to the rank of lieutenant February 1969. As a troop commander, he took part in counterinsurgency operations in the 1971 JVP Insurrection and later attended the Indian Army School of Artillery in Deolali from September 1971 to February 1972 for the Artillery Young Officers Course (Field/CB), having been promoted to the rank of captain in October 1971.

=== Staff officer ===
Captain Balagalle served as the adjutant of the 3rd(V) Battalion, Gemunu Watch, before serving as a general staff officer (grade 3) at the Army Headquarters in operations and training. He then served as general staff officer (Grade 2) at HQ Jaffna; staff officer (Grade 2) admin at Sri Lanka Army Volunteer Force HQ and SO2 logistics at Special Force HQ. He attended the Intelligence Staff Officers Course in Pune from August 1975 to October 1975, then returned to Deolali from August 1977 to September 1978 for the Long Gunnery Staff Officers Course (Field) qualifying as an instructor gunnery (IG) and was promoted to the rank of major in October 1978. He attended the Senior Officers Artillery Implementation Course in Pakistan.

=== Military intelligence ===
Having transferred to the Joint Operations Command (JOC) as the GSO 2 operations, he was promoted to lieutenant colonel in December 1985 and then served as GSO 1, where he was tasked with the military intelligence operations of the JOC, playing a major role in planning the Vadamarachchi Operation. Promoted to colonel in December 1988, he served as the colonel general staff of the JOC, directing intelligence gathering in subduing the 1987–1989 JVP insurrection. Major General Sarath Munasinghe mentions in his book A Soldier's Version, that he and Colonel Balagalle were present at the HQ Operation Combine during the interrogation of the JVP leader Rohana Wijeweera on 12 November 1989 following his capture and subsequent disappearance. He attended the Intelligence Security Course and the Intelligence Security Command Course in the United Kingdom in September 1989. Colonel Balagalle became the first director of military intelligence and commanding officer of the Military Intelligence Corps, serving from 1990 to 1994, having been promoted to the rank of brigadier in April 1991. In 1993, Brigadier Balagalle was found at fault along with several other senior officers for their failure to prevent a major attack by the LTTE by a military court of inquiry following the Battle of Pooneryn.

=== Higher command ===
Balagalle had served as brigade commander of the 4 Brigade and the Artillery Brigade as well as Area Headquarters Wanni (1994). From January 1996 to December 1996, he attended the National Security and Strategic Studies Course at the National Defence College and was promoted to the rank of major general in April 1996. Balagalle served as general officer commanding, Task Force 2 (for Elephant Pass, Pooneryn, Mullaitivu and Vavuniya areas), 51 Division. He then served as commander Security Forces Headquarters – Jaffna and Commander Security Forces Headquarters – Wanni. In latter role, he conducted several offensive operations code-named Rivibala (1998) and Ranagosha 1-4 (1999). Returning to Army Headquarters, he served as deputy chief of staff and thereafter Chief of Staff of the Army. He was also the colonel commandant of the Military Intelligence Corps (1997–1998).

=== Commander of the Army and CDS ===
On 24 August 2000, he succeeded General Srilal Weerasooriya as Commander of the Sri Lankan Army and was promoted to the rank of lieutenant general. He was the first officer cadet to be trained locally at the Army Training Centre to become the commander of the army. During his tenure, the army began deploying troops for United Nations peace keeping operations and established the Institute of Peace Support Operations Training in Kukuleganga in conjunction with the US Army Pacific Command. On Army Day, 10 October 2003, he received concurrent appointment as Chief of the Defence Staff (CDS). He was the first serving Army Commander in the country to hold the post of CDS. During his tenure, he was the first foreign military chief to visit the line of control after the ceasefire agreement between Pakistan and India was signed and as well attended the sixth Chiefs of Defence Staff Conference in Hawaii and the fifth Chiefs of Defence Conference in Singapore. He was succeeded by Lieutenant General Shantha Kottegoda on 30 June 2004 as commander of the Army. He continued as CDS until his retirement on 1 September 2005, with the rank of general.

== Personal life ==
General Balagalle married his wife Gnana Balagalle and they had three children. His son Lakmal Balagalle was also an artillery officer.

== Death ==
He died on 26 October 2023 at the Army Hospital, Narahenpita due to a brief illness at the age of 75. His funeral was held on 28 October 2023 at the Borella General Cemetery with full military honours.

== Decorations ==
His military decorations included the Rana Wickrama Padakkama (RWP) and the Rana Sura Padakkama (RSP) for gallantry; the distinguished service medals, Vishista Seva Vibhushanaya (VSV), Uttama Seva Padakkama (USP), Videsha Seva Padakkama and the Sri Lanka Armed Services Long Service Medal and Clasp; campaign medals Vadamarachchi Operation Medal, Riviresa Campaign Services Medal, Purna Bhumi Padakkama, and the North and East Operations Medal with Clasp. He also received the President's Inauguration Medal, 50th Independence Anniversary Commemoration Medal, Sri Lanka Army 50th Anniversary Medal, Sri Lanka Army Volunteer Force Centenary Medal.

His badges include: Sri Lanka Artillery Regimental Identification Badge, Instructor in Gunnery Badge and the Sri Lanka Artillery Training School Badge.

Military offices
Preceded by Lieutenant General Srilal Weerasooriya	Commander of the Sri Lankan Army; 2000–2004	Succeeded by Lieutenant General Shantha Kottegoda
Preceded by Major General Patrick Fernando	Chief of Staff of the Sri Lankan Army; 1999–2000	Succeeded by Major General Janaka Perera
