= Priyantha Perera (admiral) =

Sri Lankan admiral

Admiral Priyantha Perera RSP, USP
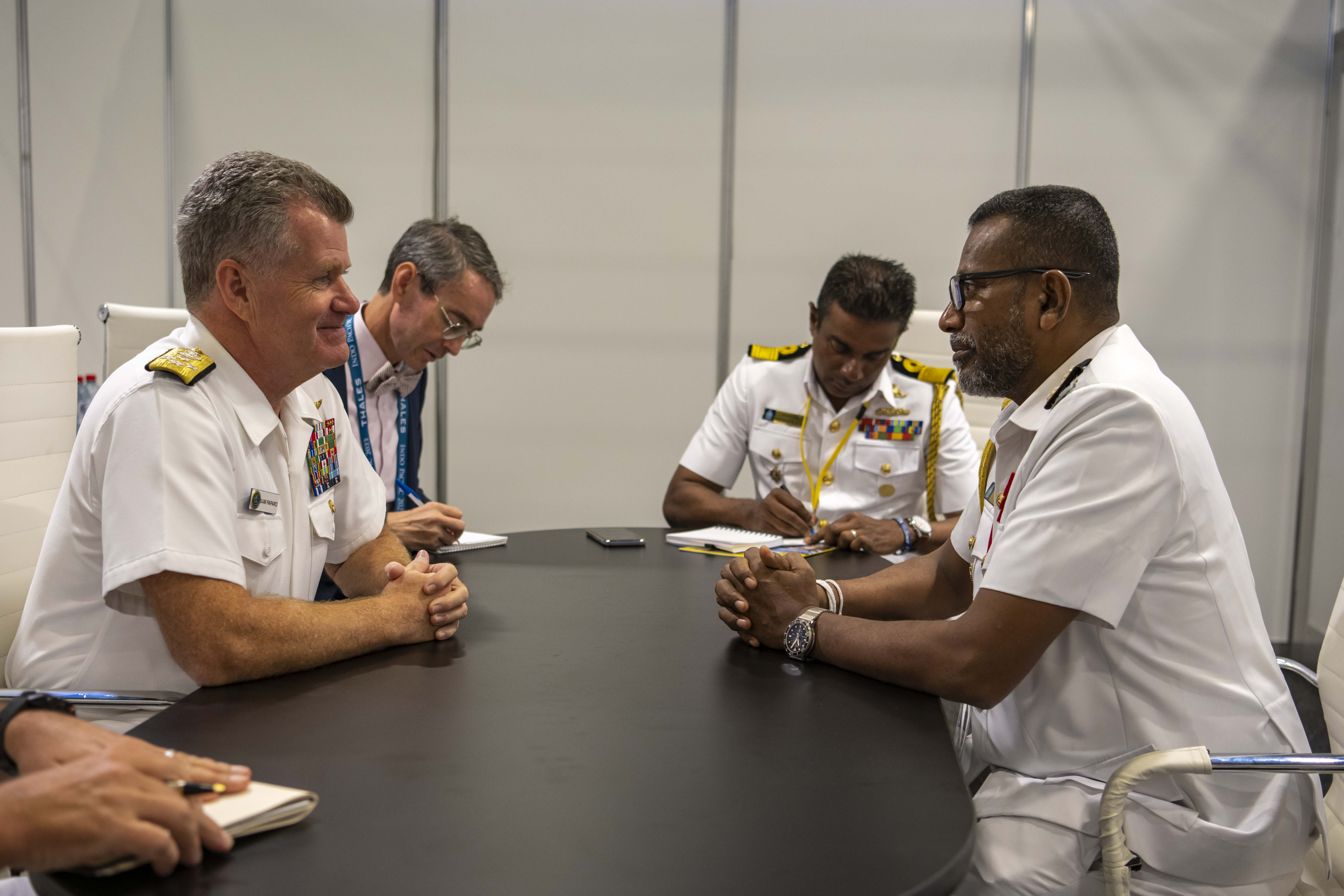
- Military career
- Allegiance: Sri Lanka
- Branch: Sri Lanka Navy
- Service years: 1989–2024
- Rank: Admiral
- Commands: Commander of the Sri Lanka Navy
- Awards: Rana Sura Padakkama; Uttama Seva Padakkama

Admiral Priyantha Perera, RSP and Bar, USP is a Sri Lankan retired naval officer. He was the 25th Commander of the Navy of the Sri Lanka Navy.

== Naval career ==
Educated at Royal College, Colombo, Perera joined the Sri Lanka Navy in the executive branch in 1987 as an Officer Cadet of the 5th intake of the General Sir John Kotelawala Defence University. He was commissioned as a Sub Lieutenant in 1989 following his training at the General Sir John Kotalawala Defence University and Naval and Maritime Academy, Trincomalee. He completed the Sub Lieutenant Technical Course at Naval and Maritime Academy in 1992 and specialized in Clearance Diving from the Indian Naval Diving Training School in 1994. He holds a Masters in Science Degree (Defence Studies) in Management from General Sir John Kotalawala Defence University and a Master’s Degree of Maritime Policy with Distinctions from University of Wollongong. He is a graduate of the US Naval War College, having passed the US Naval Staff Course in 2004 and the Defence and Strategic Studies Course at People's Liberation Army National Defence University in 2018. He become the Commander of the Sri Lanka Navy on 18 December 2022, after being elevated him to the rank of three-star Admiral.

== Honors ==
His decorations include Rana Sura Padakkama thrice for gallantry (with two Bars); Uttama Seva Padakkama for meritorious service. Other medals he has gained over the years include, the Sri Lanka Armed Services Long Service Medal, the Sri Lanka Navy 50th Anniversary Medal, the Sewabhimani Padakkama, the Sewa Padakkama, the 50th Independence Anniversary Commemoration Medal, 75th Independence Day Commemoration Medal, the Eastern Humanitarian Operations Medal, the Northern Humanitarian Operations Medal (with clasp), the North and East Operations Medal (with two clasps), the Purna Bhumi Padakkama, and the Riviresa Campaign Services Medal.

His badges include: the Fast Attack Craft (FAC) Squadron Pin, the Surface Warfare Badge, Diving Badge, Commendation Badge and the Qualified in Command and Staff Course Badge.

== Personal life ==
He is married to Commander Mala Lamahewa, a lady officer of Sri Lankan Navy. The couple is blessed with two sons.

Military offices
Preceded by Nishantha Ulugetenne	Commander of the Sri Lanka Navy; 19 December 2022 - 31 December 2024	Succeeded by Kanchana Banagoda
