= Janaka Perera =

Sri Lankan politician

Major General Janaka Perera, ජානක පෙරේරා RWP, RSP, VSV, USP
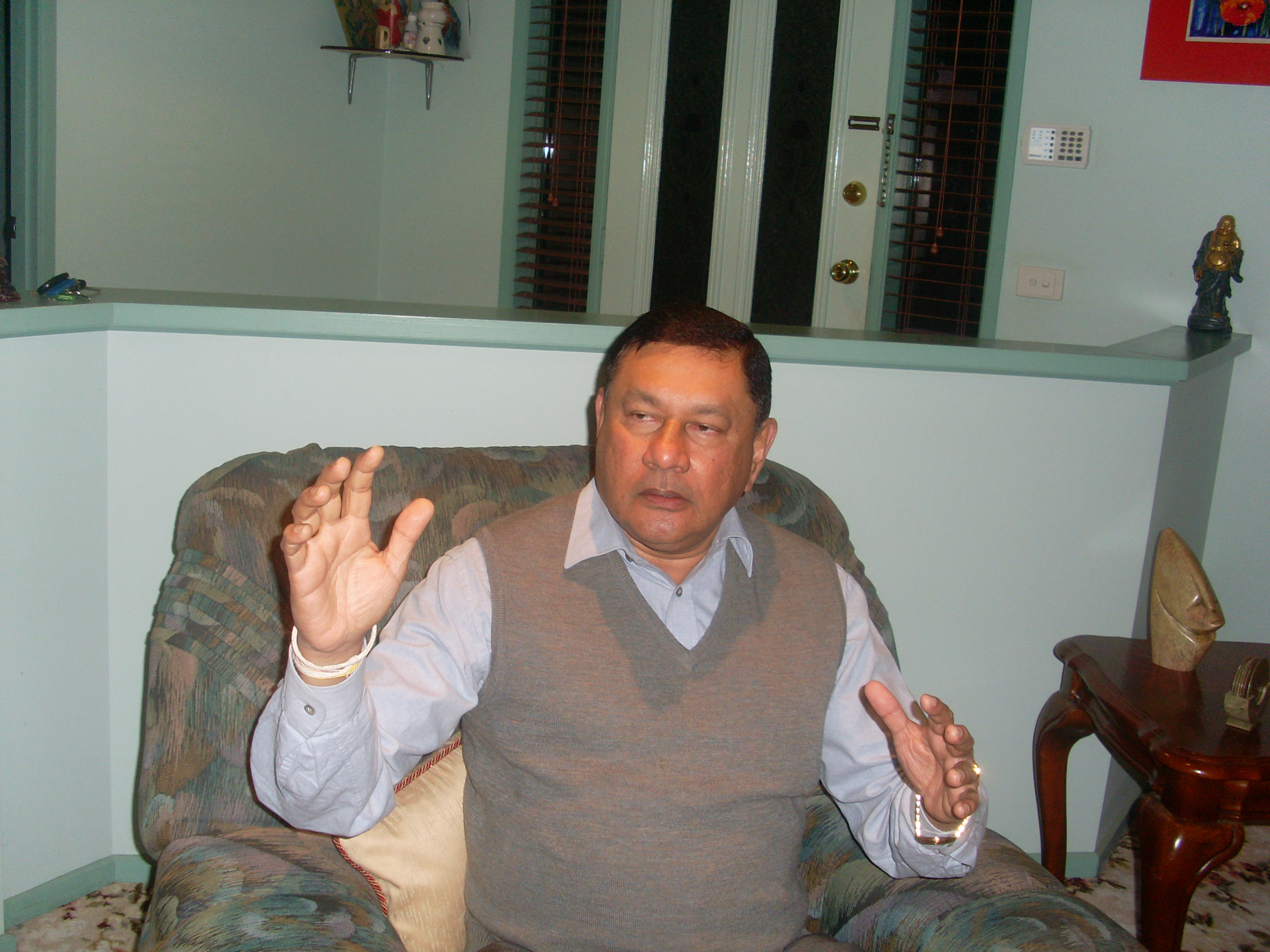

Personal details
- Born: 1 February 1946
- Died: 6 October 2008 (aged 62) Anuradhapura, Sri Lanka
- Party: United National Party
- Occupation: Military Officer, politician
- Profession: Military

Military service
- Allegiance: Sri Lanka
- Branch/service: Sri Lanka Army
- Years of service: 1966–2001 (35 years)
- Rank: Major General
- Unit: Commando Regiment, Sri Lanka Engineers
- Commands: Chief of Staff of the Sri Lanka Army, Overall Operations Commander Northern Sector, General Officer Commanding (GOC) of the 53 Division
- Battles/wars: 1971 JVP Insurrection, Insurrection 1987-89, Sri Lankan Civil War
- Awards: Rana Wickrama Padakkama; Rana Sura Padakkama, Vishista Seva Vibhushanaya; Uttama Seva Padakkama; Videsha Seva Padakkama

Major General Janaka Perera, RWP, RSP, VSV, USP, VSP (1 February 1946 – 6 October 2008) was a Sri Lankan General and politician. He served as the Chief of Staff of the Sri Lanka Army and is considered one of the most distinguished generals in Sri Lankan history. After retiring from the army he served as a Sri Lankan High Commissioner to Australia and Ambassador to Indonesia. He was the opposition leader of the North Central Provincial Council until he and his wife were killed on 6 October 2008 by a suicide bomber. The LTTE have been blamed for the bombing by Sri Lankan president Mahinda Rajapaksa.

== Education ==
General Perera was educated at St. John's College, Panadura and after St. Joseph's College, Colombo.He was accepted to University of Ceylon to study geology at the Peradeniya campus before quitting to join the Sri Lanka Army in 1966 as an Officer Cadet. He received his training at the Royal Military Academy Sandhurst in England. After completing his training he was commissioned as a second lieutenant in the 1st Field Engineer Regiment, Ceylon Engineers. Later, he transferred to the newly formed Commando Regiment. Major General Perera is a graduate of the Defence Services Staff College and the Royal College of Defence Studies.

== Military career ==
He first saw action during the 1971 JVP Insurrection as lieutenant and was promoted to captain in 1973. He was promoted to major in 1977, lieutenant colonel in 1986 and colonel in 1988; serving as the commanding officer, 5 Field Engineer Regiment; Chief Instructor, Sri Lanka Military Academy and military liaison officer, Ministry of Defence.

=== Second JVP insurrection ===
As a colonel, Janaka Perera took a significant role in suppressing the 1987–1989 JVP insurrection. He was the provincial commander of the North-Western Province as well as being in charge of the special operations of the Operation Combine in Colombo which led to the capture of the JVP leader Rohana Wijeweera. He was promoted to brigadier in 1989. He went on to command the 24 Brigade. He got parachute qualified in 1990.

=== Weli Oya ===
In 1995, Brigadier Perera was brigade commander of the Independent "Special Forces" Brigade when he was transferred to Weli Oya as the brigade commander, 6th Brigade in May 1995. He preparation and command of the brigade during the Battle of Weli Oya in July 1995 resulted in a major victory for the army, killing over 300 LTTE carders while losing only 2 soldiers; at the time of the battle 6 Brigade was made up of mostly reservists from volunteer regiments. Soon after the victory, he was transferred to command the elite Reserve Strike Force (RSF), which consisted of special forces, commando and air mobile units in Jaffna.

=== Operation Riviresa ===
A few months later in late 1995, Brigadier Perera played a major role during Operation Riviresa which led to the liberation of the Jaffna Peninsula, during which he commanded the elite 53 Division which consisted of the Independent Brigade, Air Mobile Brigade, Armored Brigade and an Infantry Brigade.

=== Higher command ===
In 1996, he was promoted to the rank of major general. He served as general officer commanding of the 53 Division, 51 Division, 23 Division. Later he was promoted to the post of deputy chief of staff and functioned as commandant, Sri Lanka Army Command and Staff College.

=== Defense of Jaffna ===
Following the Second Battle of Elephant Pass in April 2000 which forced the Sri Lankan Army units in Jaffna to fall back due to lack of fixed defence positions, Perera was appointed Overall Operations Commander (North) and was tasked with countering the LTTE offensive, along with Major General (later Field Marshal) Sarath Fonseka who was appointed Security Forces Commander, Jaffna. During this time there were fears in Colombo that the 40,000 troops in the Jaffna peninsula would be cut off, trapped, and overrun. President Chandrika Bandaranaike Kumaratunga negotiated with the Indian government for ships to evacuate troops from the peninsula due to the lack of transport ships in the Navy. However, the Indian government refused to provide ships. Launching several effective counter-offensives that halted the LTTE advance, removing the threat to the Jaffna peninsula and succeeded in established the defence line in the Jaffna peninsula, which remained in place till the last days of the war.

=== Chief of Staff ===
Major General Janaka Perera was appointed as Chief of Staff of the army in 2000 but retired in 2001 when he was overlooked for promotion to Army Commander, causing him to retire in 2001. He had the unique distinction of being the colonel commandant of the Commando Regiment, Special Forces Regiment and the Corps of Sri Lanka Engineers.

=== Decorations ===

Rana Wickrama Padakkama		Rana Sura Padakkama	
Vishista Seva Vibhushanaya	Uttama Seva Padakkama	Purna Bhumi Padakkama	North and East Operations Medal
Vadamarachchi Operation Medal	Riviresa Campaign Services Medal	Republic of Sri Lanka Armed Services Medal	50th Independence Anniversary Commemoration Medal
Sri Lanka Army 50th Anniversary Medal	Sri Lanka Armed Services Long Service Medal	President's Inauguration Medal	Videsha Seva Padakkama

Major General Janaka Perera had been awarded the gallantry medals Rana Wickrama Padakkama and Rana Sura Padakkama, the distinguished service medal the Vishista Seva Vibhushanaya, long service medals Uttama Seva Padakkama, Sri Lanka Armed Services Long Service Medal, foreign service medal Videsha Seva Padakkama, combat service medals Purna Bhumi Padakkama, North and East Operations Medal the campaign medals Vadamarachchi Operation Medal and the Riviresa Campaign Services Medal and also the Republic of Sri Lanka Armed Services Medal, 50th Independence Anniversary Medal 1998, Sri Lanka Army 50th Anniversary Medal and President's Inauguration Medal.

== Diplomatic career ==
Following his retirement he was made Sri Lanka's high commissioner to Australia and later Sri Lanka's ambassador to Indonesia, but was recalled before his term ended.

Accusation of war crime

After he was appointed Sri Lanka's high commissioner to Australia, the Tamil community there accused him of being responsible for hundreds of deaths and the torture of Tamils in the Jaffna Peninsula when he was in command. About 300 Tamils protested outside the Australian parliament accusing General Perera of war crimes. The human rights group Amnesty International raised similar concerns. However, no formal charges were ever brought against General Perera and he served his full four years as Sri Lankan High Commissioner in Australia, after which he was Sri Lankan Ambassador to Indonesia.

== Political career ==
Since his retirement from his diplomatic career, General Perera took up active politics as a member and an organizer of the United National Party (UNP).

=== North Central Provincial Council ===
During the 2008 North Central Provincial Council election, which he claimed to be marred by violence, he was as the UNP candidate for the post of Chief Minister for the North Central Province, although he gained the most preferential votes his party failed to gain a majority in the council, therefore became the Leader of the Opposition of the North Central Provincial Council.

== Family ==
Janaka Perera married Vajira de Silva, who was one of the first six officers to join the Sri Lanka Army Women's Corps in 1982. Vajira trained at the Women's Royal Army Corps College in 1980 and had reached the rank of major before her retirement from the army. Her brother Lieutenant Upul de Silva, who had also joined the army was killed in action. Janaka and Vajira Perera had three children together: Janukshi, Shehara and Ashanka.

== Assassination ==
Janaka Perera and his wife were killed by a suspected suicide bomb blast on 6 October 2008 in Anuradhapura. The bombing which occurred at the United National Party office near the Old Bus Stand in Anuradhapura, killed about 27 civilians and politicians while injuring 90 more. The dead included 4 UNP provincial councillors and former Sri Lankan Ambassador and UNP party manager in Anuradhapura Dr Rajah Johnpullé and his wife. The government blamed the attack on the Liberation Tigers of Tamil Eelam. The UNP and opposition leader Ranil Wickremesinghe has asked for an international investigation on the death of Janaka Perera and numerous others.

=== Request for security ===
The government has been blamed by Wikremesinghe and others for not providing adequate security for General Perera, who had to ask the Supreme Court for protection during the provincial council election when the government candidate was given security and he was not. Two weeks prior to the assassination, Janaka Perera had complaint to the Superintendent of Police - Anuradhapura for security having received information on a threat to his life. He had cited that he had received a detail of seven police officers prior to the provincial elections on a Supreme Court order and had been withdrawn by the government. His lawyers had been preparing a fundamental rights petition in the Supreme Court the week he was assassinated.

=== Funeral ===
After laying in Anuradhapura for the public to pay their respects, the coffins of Major General Janaka Perera and his wife Vajira Perera were transported to Colombo to their residence in Kirullapone. On 11 October 2008, the coffins were taken by procession to the Colombo General Cemetery, where the coffin of Major General Janaka Perera was transfers to a gun carriage of the Sri Lanka Artillery and final rites carried out with full military honors.

=== Aftermath ===
On 5 September 2014, the Anuradhapura High Court sentenced the first accused in the bombing, Sanmuganathan Sudhaharan who was linked to the LTTE suicide wing to a twenty year rigorous imprisonment having been found guilty on two counts of conspiring and abetment to suicide bombing. The accused had pleaded guilty on 22 August 2014. The second accused, Hameer Umar was sentenced to life in prison by the Anuradhapura Special High Court. Umar had pleaded not guilty to the charges and the case was transferred to the Anuradhapura Special High Court in September 2015 on a directive by the chief justice.

== See also ==
- Sri Lankan Non Career Diplomats

Military offices
Preceded by Major General Lionel Balagalle	Chief of Staff of the Sri Lanka Army; 2000–2001	Succeeded by Major General Shantha Kottegoda
