= Sri Lankan campaign medals =

Military decorations of Sri Lanka

Prior to 1956 the Sri Lankan armed forces received honours of the United Kingdom, including military decorations and campaign medals. Since 1981, Sri Lanka has introduced its own honours system. This has resulted in a new system of Sri Lankan honours, military and police awards, and campaign medals.

== 19th century ==
- Capture of Ceylon Medal
- Ceylon Medal

== South African War ==
- Queen's South Africa Medal
- King's South Africa Medal

== World War I ==
- 1914 Star
- 1914–15 Star
- British War Medal
- Victory Medal

== World War II ==
- 1939–1945 Star
- Air Crew Europe Star
- Africa Star
- Burma Star
- Italy Star
- France and Germany Star
- Defence Medal
- War Medal 1939–1945

== Post World War II ==
- General Service Medal 1918–62 (Malaya clasp)
- Purna Bhumi Padakkama
- North and East Operations Medal
- Vadamarachchi Operation Medal
- Riviresa Campaign Services Medal
- Eastern Humanitarian Operations Medal
- Northern Humanitarian Operations Medal

== See also ==
- Military awards and decorations of Sri Lanka
- Orders, decorations, and medals of Sri Lanka
