= Athula Jayawardane =

Sri Lanka Army general

- Military career
- Branch: Sri Lanka Army
- Service years: 1980–2011
- Rank: Major General
- Unit: Sri Lanka Artillery
- Commands: Commander Security Forces Headquarters – Mullaittivu, Commander Security Forces Headquarters - Kilinochchi, 21 Division
- Conflicts: Sri Lankan Civil War, Insurrection 1987–89
- Awards: Rana Sura Padakkama, Uttama Seva Padakkama

Major General Athula Jayawardane, RSP, USP, ndc, SLA was a Sri Lankan army general, who was the former Commander Security Forces Headquarters – Mullaitivu (SFHQ-MLT); Commander Security Forces Headquarters - Kilinochchi (SFHQ-KLN); Director General Rehabilitation; Master-General of the Ordnance; Director Operations, General Staff; GOC, 21 Division; Brigade Commander, Artillery Brigade, 551 Infantry Brigade and 215 Infantry Brigade. He was also the military attaché to the Sri Lankan Embassy in Washington, D.C.

Educated at Royal College, Colombo, Jayawardane joined the army in 1980, undergoing basic training at the Sri Lanka Military Academy. He was commissioned into the Sri Lanka Artillery in 1981 as a Second Lieutenant. He went on to become the commanding officer the 4th Field Artillery Regiment, SLA.

He holds an MSc in Defence and Strategic Studies from the PLA National Defense University, Beijing and has undergone the Senior Command Course of the Indian Army.

General Jayawardane has received the Rana Sura Padakkama (RSP) for bravery and the service medals Uttama Seva Padakkama (USP) and the Sri Lanka Armed Services Long Service Medal. He has received the Desha Putra Sammanaya for sustaining wounds in combat and gained the campaign medals Riviresa Campaign Services Medal, the Purna Bhumi Padakkama, the North and East Operations Medal, Humanitarian Operations Medal (East) and the Humanitarian Operations Medal (North).
