= Udaya Nanayakkara =

Sri Lankan general

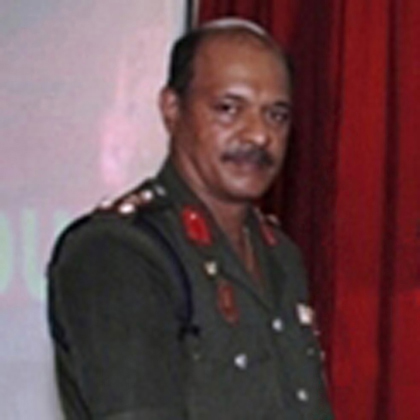
- As a Brig.
- Military career
- Branch: Sri Lanka Army
- Service years: 1981 – 2015
- Rank: Major General
- Unit: Sri Lanka Engineers
- Commands: Chief Field Engineer, Sri Lanka Army, Brigade Commander 55-2 "Muhamale" Brigade, Brigade Commander 21-4 "Paryanakulam " Brigade
- Conflicts: Sri Lankan Civil War, Insurrection 1987-89
- Awards: Uttama Seva Padakkama
- Other work: Chairman of the Urban Development Authority

Major General V. Udaya B. Nanayakkara, USP was a Sri Lankan military engineer. The Chairman of the Ministry of Urban Development, he was the former Chief Field Engineer of the Sri Lanka Army, Brigade Commander 55-2 "Muhamale" Brigade and 21-4 "Paryanakulam " Brigade. He was also the former Military Spokesman, Director, Directorate of Media and Director, Directorate of Psychological Operations.

Educated at the Royal College, Colombo after completing his education he joined the Sri Lanka Army in 1981 as Officer Cadet. Following basic training at the Sri Lanka Military Academy, he was commissioned into the Sri Lanka Engineers in as a Second Lieutenant. He is a graduate of the College of Defence Management and the National Defence University, Pakistan. During his military service he had served as Commander Area Headquarters, Kandy; Director, Directorate of Psychological Operations; Centre Commandant Regimental Headquarters, Sri Lanka Engineers; Brigade Commander, 552 "Muhamale" Brigade; Brigade Commander, 214 "Paryanakulam " Brigade.

General Nanayakkara has received the Uttama Seva Padakkama (USP), the Sri Lanka Armed Services Long Service Medal, the Riviresa Campaign Services Medal, the Purna Bhumi Padakkama, the North and East Operations Medal and the 50th Independence Anniversary Commemoration Medal.

Following his retirement, he served as the Director General of Urban Housing Development Authority of Sri Lanka and was appointed Chairman of the Urban Development Authority. He had served as the Honorary Consul of the Republic of Serbia in Sri Lanka, as of January 2021.

Military offices
Preceded by N/A	Chief Field Engineer, Sri Lanka Army; 2010 -	Succeeded by
