= Chandana Welikala =

- Military career
- Allegiance: Sri Lanka
- Branch: Sri Lanka Air Force
- Rank: Air Vice Marshal
- Commands: Director Administration
- Awards: USP

Air Vice Marshal Chandana Welikala (also known as Chandana Prabath Welikala) USP is the Director of Administration for the Sri Lanka Air Force.

== Early life ==
Born in 1963, Chandana initially schooled at Mahanama College Colombo and later attended Nalanda College, Colombo, where he excelled in studies and sports. He captained the Nalanda Athletics Team and was a Nalanda Junior Athletic captain.

== Career ==
Chandana joined the Sri Lanka Air Force as an officer cadet in April 1983 and was commissioned as a pilot officer in 1984. He has also been the Commander of the SLAF Wirawila Station, and was Deputy Director of Personnel Services prior to his appointment as Command Provost Marshal.

Chandana is a recipient of service medals and decorations including Uttama Seva Padakkama for Meritorious Service, Purna Bhumi Padakkama, Riviresa Campaign Services Medal, Northern Humanitarian Operations Medal, and the Eastern Humanitarian Operations Medal.
