= Jagath Kodithuwakku =

Sri Lankan general

Major General Jagath Kodithuwakku
- Born: 26 November 1967 (age 58); Galle, Sri Lanka
- Military career
- Allegiance: Sri Lankan
- Branch: Sri Lanka Army
- Service years: 1986–2022
- Rank: Major General
- Unit: Sri Lanka Light Infantry
- Awards: Rana Wickrama Padakkama (RWP); Rana Sura Padakkama (RSP); 25px Purna Bhumi Padakkama; Eastern Humanitarian Operations Medal; North and East Operations Medal; Riviresa Campaign Services Medal; Sri Lanka Army 50th Anniversary Medal

Jagath Kodithuwakku, RWP RSP ndu is a retired Sri Lankan general. He was the 60th Chief of Staff of the Sri Lanka Army(CoS) and former Deputy Chief of Staff of Sri Lanka Army. He also served as the Colonel of the Regiment of Sri Lanka Light Infantry.

== Early life and education ==
Jagath Kodithuwakku received his education from St. Aloysius College Galle. General Kodithuwakku completed his graduation from the University of Colombo. He received his MS degree in Human Resource Management and a Post Graduate Diploma in Human Resource Advancement. He also completed another Postgraduate Diploma in Conflict Resolution and Security Studies from the University of Bradford in UK. He is also a distinguished graduate of Asia Pacific Centre for Security Studies USA.

== Military career ==
He enlisted in the Sri Lanka Army on 27 October 1986 to the Intake 26 and completed the basic training at the Sri Lanka Military Academy. After completion of officer training at Sri Lanka Military Academy (SLMA) and Pakistan Military Academy(PMA), Kodithuwakku was commissioned as a second lieutenant in the 3rd Battalion Sri Lanka Light Infantry. He served as the Commander Security Force - Jaffna before he joined at Deputy Chief office. He retired in November 2022 from the post "Chief of staff of the Army, Sri Lanka".
