= Chief of Staff of the Sri Lanka Army =

Chief of Staff of the Army
- Incumbent; Major General Sampath Fernando
- Sri Lanka Army
- Type: Seconed in Command of the Sri Lanka Army, Deputy to the Commander of the Army
- Status: Two star general
- Abbreviation: COS
- Reports to: Commander of the Army
- Residence: Colombo
- Seat: Army HQ
- Nominator: President of Sri Lanka
- Appointer: President of Sri Lanka
- Term length: Not fixed
- Precursor: Chief of General Staff
- Formation: 1949
- First holder: Lt. Col. Anton Muttukumaru
- Deputy: Deputy Chief of Staff

Chief of Staff of the Army (CoSA) has been the title of the second in command of the Sri Lanka Army. The post is held by a regular officer of the rank of major general and is the second senior position in the army. Chief of staff is charged with assisting the Army Commander in both operational and administrative aspects, functioning as the Acting Army Commander in his absences or incantation. Chief of staff is assisted by the Deputy Chief of Staff of the Army.

== History ==
The post was established in 1949, when Lieutenant Colonel Anton Muttukumaru was appointed as chief of staff to Brigadier the Earl of Caithness, the first Army Commander when the Ceylon Army was formed. The post was thereafter held by one of the senior most officers in the Ceylon Army, usually of the rank of colonel. In 1955, Colonel Gerard Wijeyekoon held the post and served as Acting Army Commander, while Brigadier Muttukumaru attend Imperial Defence College. On his return in 1956 Brigadier Muttukumaru assumed command of the army and Colonel Wijeyekoon was transferred to the newly created post of Commandant of the Volunteer Force which became the second most senior post in the army. Since 1966, it became the third-ranking after that of Army Commander. In the 1970s the post became a Brigadier's posting In the early 1990s the post of Deputy Chief of Staff was created. The post of chief of staff has become a Major General's posting since the early 1980s.

== List of chiefs of staff ==
No	Chief of Staff	Took office	Left office	Unit of commission	Notes
1	Lieutenant Colonel Anton Muttukumaru OBE, ED	10 October 1949	31 December 1953	Ceylon Light Infantry	Later Lieutenant ColonelAnton Muttukumaru was appointed as 3rd Commander of the Army and promoted to Major General.
2	Lieutenant Colonel H.W.G. Wijeyekoon OBE, ED	1 January 1954	09 February 1955	Ceylon Light Infantry	Later Lieutenant Colonel H. W. G. Wijeyekoon was appointed as 4th Commander of the Army and promoted to Major General.
3	Colonel Maurice de Mel	10 February 1955	13 November 1959	Ceylon Garrison Artillery	
4	Colonel Bertram Heyn	13 November 1959	1 December 1962	Ceylon Light Infantry	Later Colonel Bertram Heyn was appointed as 6th Commander of the Army and promoted to Brigadier. Later he was promoted to Major General.
5	Colonel Richard Udugama MBE	1 December 1962	14 November 1963	Ceylon Light Infantry	Later Colonel Richard Udugama was appointed as 5th Commander of the Army and promoted to Brigadier. He was later promoted to the rank of Major General.
6	Colonel Sepala Attygalle LVO	21 March 1964	22 September 1967	Ceylon Light Infantry	Later Colonel Sepala Attygalle was appointed as 7th Commander of the Army and promoted to General on his retirement.
7	Colonel P. D. Ramayanayake	26 March 1966	5 January 1967	Ceylon Engineers	Officiated while Colonel Sepala Attygalle following his Imperial Defence College course in London.
8	Brigadier M. A. Jayaweera	1 February 1969	1 February 1974	Ceylon Light Infantry	
9	Brigadier E. T. De Z Abeysekera	1 February 1974	3 May 1976	Ceylon Light Infantry	
10	Brigadier C. T. Caldera	3 May 1976	1 April 1977	Ceylon Light Infantry	
11	Brigadier Denis Perera VSV	5 August 1977	13 October 1977	Ceylon Engineers	Later Brigadier Denis Perera was appointed as 8th Commander of the Army and promoted to Major General. On his retirement he was promoted to Lieutenant General. In 2007 he was promoted to General.
12	Brigadier T. S. B. Sally	1 December 1977	15 March 1979	Ceylon Light Infantry	On two occasions (18 February 1978 and 16 October 1978) Brig Sally was acting Commander of the Army when the Commander was overseas on assignments. He was the last officer from the Ceylon Defence Force to leave active service.
13	Brigadier Tissa Weerathunga VSV	18 March 1979	14 October 1981	Ceylon Light Infantry	Later Brigadier Tissa Weerathunga was appointed as 9th Commander of the Army and promoted to Major General. On his retirement he was promoted to Lieutenant General and appointed as first General Officer Commanding of the Joint Operation Command.
14	Brigadier Cyril Ranatunga VSV	15 February 1982	4 February 1983	Ceylon Light Infantry	He retired as COS and later was recalled from retirement in September 1985 and promoted to the rank of Lieutenant General, to serve as the General Officer Commanding, Joint Operations Command (JOC).
15	Brigadier Mano Madawela	18 August 1983	24 September 1986	Gemunu Watch	After Brigadier Cyril Ranatunga's retirement, post of Chief of Staff was vacant for around 8 months before Brigadier Mano Madawala's appointment.
16	Brigadier E. G. Thevanayagam	1 October 1986	10 January 1987	Ceylon Light Infantry	
17	Brigadier J. G. Balthazar	10 January 1987	5 December 1987	Ceylon Light Infantry	
18	Major General C. A. M. N. Silva	15 December 1987	4 July 1988	Ceylon Light Infantry	
19	Major General Hamilton Wanasinghe	15 July 1988	16 August 1988	Ceylon Artillery	Later Major General Hamilton Wanasinghe was appointed as 11th Commander of the Army and promoted to Lieutenant General. On his retirement he was promoted to General and appointed as the general officer commanding (GOC) of the Joint Operations Headquarters (JOH) serving from 1991 to 1993.
20	Major General S.M.A. Jayawardena	16 August 1988	18 March 1989	Ceylon Light Infantry	
21	Major General Cecil Waidyaratne	23 March 1989	16 November 1991	Ceylon Armoured Corps	Later Major General Cecil Waidyaratne was appointed as 12th Commander of the Army and promoted to Lieutenant General. On his retirement he was promoted to General.
22	Major General J. R. S de Silva	16 November 1991	10 June 1992	Ceylon Engineers	
23	Major General Y. Balaretnarajah	10 June 1992	30 September 1992	Ceylon Armoured Corps	
24	Major General G. H. de Silva	23 October 1992	1 January 1994	Ceylon Sinha Regiment	Later Major General G. H. De Silva was appointed as 13th Commander of the Army and promoted to Lieutenant General. On his retirement he was promoted to General.
25	Major General Lakshman Algama	1 January 1994	2 April 1995	Gemunu Watch	
26	Major General Rohan Daluwatte	2 June 1995	1 May 1996	Ceylon Armoured Corps	Later Major General Rohan Daluwatte was appointed as 14th Commander of the Army and promoted to Lieutenant General. On his retirement he was promoted to General. After his retirement, he was appointed Chairman of the newly created Joint Operations Bureau, however he was reinstated to active service with the formation of the post of Chief of Defence Staff.
27	Major General A.M.U. Seneviratne	1 May 1996	10 December 1996	Ceylon Light Infantry	
28	Major General H.S. Hapuarachchi VSV, USP	11 December 1996	22 February 1998	Ceylon Sinha Regiment	
29	Major General Srilal Weerasooriya RWP, RSP, VSV, USP	23 February 1998	16 December 1998	Ceylon Artillery	Later Major General Srilal Weerasooriya was appointed as 15th Commander of the Army and promoted to Lieutenant General. On his retirement he was promoted to General.
30	Major General Patrick Fernando	16 December 1998	2 April 1999	Gemunu Watch	
31	Major General Lionel Balagalle RWP, RSP, VSV, USP	2 April 1999	24 August 2000	Ceylon Artillery	Later Major General Lionel Balagalle was appointed as 16th Commander of the Army and promoted to Lieutenant General. On 10 October 2003, he was appointed as Chief of the Defence Staff (CDS) as serving army commander.
32	Major General Janaka Perera RWP, RSP, VSV, USP, VSP	15 June 2000	31 January 2001	Ceylon Engineers	
33	Major General Neil Dias VSV	1 February 2001	13 April 2002	Ceylon Armoured Corps	
34	Major General Lohan Gunawardena RWP, RSP	13 April 2002	22 November 2003	Gemunu Watch	
35	Major General Shantha KottegodaWWV, RWP, RSP, VSV, USP	23 November 2003	30 June 2004	Ceylon Light Infantry	Later Major General Shantha Kottegoda was appointed as 17th Commander of the Army and promoted to Lieutenant General. On his retirement he was promoted to General.
36	Major General Chula Seneviratne USP	1 July 2004	9 December 2004	Ceylon Signals Corps	
37	Major General Sarath FonsekaRWP, RSP, VSV, USP	9 December 2004	6 December 2005	Ceylon Sinha Regiment	Later Major General Sarath Fonseka was appointed as 18th Commander of the Army and promoted to Lieutenant General. At the end of the war he was promoted to General, becoming the first army commander to hold a full General rank. On 15 July 2009 he was the first person appointed CDS under the newly approved Chief of Defence Staff Act. On On 22 March 2015, he was promoted to Field Marshal.
38	Major General Nanda Mallawaarachchi	6 December 2005	3 February 2007	Sri Lanka Light Infantry	
39	Major General U.B.L. Fernando	3 February 2007	5 February 2008	Gajaba Regiment	
40	Major General N Wijesinghe	5 February 2008	2 March 2009	Sri Lanka Artillery	
41	Major General G.A. Chandrasiri	1 March 2009	12 July 2009	Sri Lanka Armoured Corps	
42	Major General Mendaka Samarasinghe	24 July 2009	29 January 2010	Sri Lanka Engineers	
43	Major General Daya Ratnayake	January 2010	30 July 2013	Sri Lanka Light Infantry	Later Major General Daya Ratnayake was appointed as 20th Commander of the Army and promoted to Lieutenant General. On his retirement he was promoted to General.
44	Major General A.W.J.C. De Silva	5 September 2013	16 June 2014	Sri Lanka Engineers	Later Major General Crishantha de Silva was appointed as 21st Commander of the Army and promoted to Lieutenant General. In June 2017 he was promoted to General and appointed as Chief of Defence Staff.
45	Major General Prasad Samarasinghe	17 May 2014	6 May 2015	Sri Lanka Signals Corps	
46	Major General Jagath Dias	7 May 2015	26 December 2015	Vijayabahu Infantry Regiment	
47	Major General Milinda Peiris	12 February 2016	11 August 2016	Sri Lanka Armoured Corps	
48	Major General Ubaya Madawela	1 November 2016	2 December 2016	Sri Lanka Armoured Corps	
49	Major General Channa Gunathilaka	14 December 2016	March 2017	Sri Lanka Engineers	
50	Major General Mahesh Senanayake RWP, RSP, USP	22 March 2017	3 July 2017	Sri Lanka Engineers	Later Major General Mahesh Senanayake was appointed as 22nd Commander of the Army and promoted to Lieutenant General. On his retirement he was promoted to General.
51	Major General Amal KarunasekaraRWP, RSP, VSV, USP	22 July 2017	13 March 2018	Sri Lanka Light Infantry	
52	Major General Dampath FernandoRWP, RSP, VSV, USP	27 April 2018	December 2018	Gemunu Watch	
53	Major General Shavendra SilvaWWV, RWP, RSP, VSV, USP	9 January 2019	18 August 2019	Gajaba Regiment	Later Major General Shavendra Silva was appointed as 23rd Commander of the Army and promoted to Lieutenant General. In January 2020, General Silva was appointed as Acting Chief of Defence Staff, while serving as Army Commander. He was promoted to the rank of General on 28 December 2020. On his retirement on 1 June 2022, he was confirmed as Chief of Defence Staff.
54	Major General Sathyapriya Liyanage WWV, RWP, VSV, USP	23 August 2019	1 June 2020	Sri Lanka Armoured Corps	
55	Major General Jagath GunawardenaRSP, VSV, USP	2 June 2020	15 December 2020	Sri Lanka Engineers	
56	Major General Prabath Dematanpitiya	16 December 2020	17 January 2021	Sri Lanka Signals Corps	
57	Major General Senarath Bandara RWP, RSP	18 January 2021	16 July 2021	Gemunu Watch	
58	Major General Priyantha Perera RWP, RSP	17 July 2021	6 December 2021	Gemunu Watch	
59	Major General Vikum Liyanage RWP, RSP	7 December 2021	30 May 2022	Gajaba Regiment	Later Major General Vikum Liyanage was appointed as 24th Commander of the Army and promoted to Lieutenant General.
60	Major General Jagath Kodithuwakku RWP, RSP	8 June 2022	26 November 2022	Sri Lanka Light Infantry	
61	Major General Channa WeerasuriyaRWP, RSP	29 November 2022	14 July 2023	Sri Lanka Light Infantry	
62	Major General Sanjaya Wanasinghe RSP, VSV, USP, VSP	15 July 2023	13 October 2023	Sri Lanka Artillery	He is the eldest son of 11th commander of Sri Lanka Army, General Hamilton Wanasinghe.
63	Major General W.H.K.S Peiris RWP, RSP, VSV, USP	16 December 2023	03 June 2024	Gajaba Regiment	
64	Major General S.R.B. Aluvihare RWP, RSP	20 June 2023	11 September 2024	Vijayabahu Infantry Regiment	
65	Major General Dinesh Nanayakkara RSP, VSV, USP	13 September 2024	8 February 2025	Sri Lanka Sinha Regiment	
66	Major General Chandana Wickramasinghe RWP, RSP	9 February 2025	25 June 2025	Gajaba Regiment	
67	Major General D.K.S.K Dolage USP	26 June 2025	2 April 2026	Sri Lanka Engineers	
68	Major General Y.A.B.M Yahampath RWP, RSP	2 April 2026	27 May 2026	Sri Lanka Light Infantry	
69	Major General K.V.N.P. Premaratne RSP, USP	1 June 2026	31 July 2026	Sri Lanka Artillery	Later Major General K.V.N.P. Premaratne was appointed as 36th Commander of the Army and promoted to Lieutenant General.
70	Major General U.K.D.D.P. Udugama RWP, RSP, VSV, USP	4 August 2026	16 October 2026	Gajaba Regiment	
71	Major General Sampath Fernando USP	27 October 2026	Todate	Sri Lanka Artillery	
