= Priyantha Perera =

Priyantha Perera may refer to:

- Niroshan Perera, Sri Lankan politician
- Priyantha Perera (naval officer), Sri Lankan naval officer
