= Vikum =

Vikum is a given name. Notable people with the name include:

- Vikum Liyanage, Sri Lanka Army general
- Vikum Sanjaya (born 1992), Sri Lankan cricketer
