= Prabath Dematanpitiya =

Sri Lankan army general

- Military career
- Allegiance: Sri Lanka
- Branch: Sri Lanka Army
- Service years: 1985 –
- Rank: Major General
- Commands: Chief of Staff of Sri Lanka Army
- Conflicts: Sri Lankan Civil War

Major General Prabath Dematanpitiya (also known as D.A.P.N Dematanpitiya) was the Chief of Staff of Sri Lanka Army.

He was also former General Officer Commanding, 56 Division Wanni (SFHQ-W) of the Sri Lanka Army.

== Early life ==
Dematanpitiya was educated at Nalanda College Colombo and also a MSc Degree graduate of National Defence University, Pakistan in National Security and War Studies.
