= Karyakshama Seva Padakkama =

- Type: Service medal
- Awarded for: Dedication to duty with at least 15 years of continuous service with perfect disciplinary and service record.
- Description: Suspended from a plain suspension bar
- Presented by: Sri Lanka
- Eligibility: All ranks of the Sri Lanka Army Volunteer Force
- Post-nominals: KSP
- Clasps: None
- Status: Currently awarded
- Established: 1986
- Ribbon bar

Precedence
- Next (higher): Karyakshama Seva Vibhushanaya
- Equivalent: Prashansaniya Seva Padakkama (Sri Lanka Navy)
- Next (lower): Ceylon Armed Services Inauguration Medal

The Karyakshama Seva Padakkama (KSP, Efficient Service Medal) (Sinhala: කාර්යක්ෂම සේවා පදක්කම kāryakṣama sēvā padakkama) is a service medal awarded by the Military of Sri Lanka to all servicepersons of the Sri Lanka Army Volunteer Force in recognition of "...long, meritorious, loyal and valuable service of proven capacity". Established on 7 January 1986, the medal does not confer any individual precedence.

== History ==
Warrant officers, non-commissioned officers and men of the Ceylon Volunteer Force were awarded the Efficiency Medal until 1972 when Sri Lanka became a republic. The Karyakshama Seva Padakkama was established in 1986 as a replacement for the Efficiency Medal, with personnel of the rank of Warrant Officer and below, who had completed 18 years of service with an excellent record on or after 22 May 1972 were eligible for the medal. Since 2020, the medal has been open to all ranks of the Sri Lanka Army Volunteer Force, including commissioned officers making it the volunteer force equivalent to the Uttama Seva Padakkama.

== Award process ==
All Sri Lanka Army Volunteer Force servicepersons at the rank of Warrant Officer and below who, by or after 22 May 1972, have completed 18 years of service with an excellent record are eligible for award of the medal until 2020. Since 2020, awarded to all ranks of the Sri Lanka Army Volunteer Force for dedication to duty with at least 15 years of continuous service with perfect disciplinary and service record. Recipients are entitled to use the post-nominal letters "KSP".
