= Prashansaniya Seva Padakkama =

- Type: Service medal
- Awarded for: 18 years of service with an exceptional record
- Description: Suspended from a plain suspension bar
- Presented by: Sri Lanka
- Eligibility: Petty Officers, Leading Seamen and Seamen of the Sri Lanka Volunteer Naval Force
- Post-nominals: PSP
- Clasps: None
- Status: Currently awarded
- Established: 2000
- Ribbon bar

Precedence
- Next (higher): Prashansaniya Seva Vibhushanaya
- Equivalent: Karyakshama Seva Padakkama (Sri Lanka Army)
- Next (lower): Ceylon Armed Services Inauguration Medal

The Prashansaniya Seva Padakkama (PSP, Good Conduct Medal) (Sinhala: ප්‍රසංශනීය සේවා පදක්කම prasanṣanīya sēvā padakkama) is a medal awarded by the Military of Sri Lanka to all noncommissioned officers and seamen of the Sri Lanka Volunteer Naval Force in recognition of "long, meritorious, loyal, valuable, service and unblemished conduct". It was established on 31 January 2000, and does not confer any individual precedence. Other ranks of the Ceylon Royal Naval Volunteer Reserve had been awarded the Royal Naval Volunteer Reserve Long Service and Good Conduct Medal from 1938 to 1950.

== Award process ==
Ranks of Petty Officers and below are eligible for the award who, by or after 22 May 1972, have completed 18 years qualifying service. Recipients are entitled to use the post-nominal letters "PSP".

== See also ==
- Karyakshama Seva Padakkama
- Prashansaniya Seva Vibhushanaya
