= Capture of Ceylon Medal =

East India Company medal for 1795 invasion of Ceylon

- Obverse and reverse of a silver medal
- Type: Campaign medal
- Description: Circular medal, struck in gold and silver
- Presented by: East India Company
- Eligibility: Bengal Army artillerymen
- Campaign: Invasion of Ceylon
- Established: 15 May 1807

Highlights
- Total: 123 (2 gold, 121 silver)
- Worn round the neck on a yellow cord

The Capture of Ceylon Medal was a campaign medal awarded by the East India Company to Bengal Army artillerymen who took part in the British invasion of Ceylon in 1795.

== Criteria ==
The medal was instituted on 15 May 1807 by an Order in Council at Fort William, India. It was awarded to surviving members of the Bengal Army's artillery units who served under the command of the East India Company during the British invasion of Ceylon, which lasted from 21 July 1795 to 16 February 1796. The medals were finally completed and distributed in 1811.

Two medals were cast in gold for award to officers, probably captains Barton and Clarke but possibly to two native officers, with 121 being cast in silver for Indian non-commissioned officers and enlisted men (known as Gun Lascars) of the artillery units.

Other participants of the invasion, including other East India Company troops and British Armed Forces personnel, did not receive a medal.

== Description ==
The medal was struck at the Calcutta Mint in gold and in silver. Both types were 2 inches (51 mm) in diameter. They were of a plain design, with both sides of the medal having only an inscription:
The obverse has the English wording: For Services on the Island of Ceylon A.D. 1795/6.
The reverse has a Persian inscription that translates as: This medal was given by way of acknowledgment of services in Ceylon in the year of the Hijrah 1209-1210.
The medal was issued unnamed.
The original suspension was a flattened loop, riveted at the base, and was intended to be worn round the neck with a yellow cord; the EIC would not award medals with ribbons proper until 1826 with the award of the Burma Medal.

== See also ==
- Ceylon Medal
- Military awards and decorations of Sri Lanka
