= Prashansaniya Seva Vibhushanaya =

- Type: Service medal
- Awarded for: 18 years of service with an exceptional record
- Description: Suspended from a plain suspension bar
- Presented by: Sri Lanka
- Eligibility: Commissioned officers of the Sri Lanka Volunteer Naval Force
- Post-nominals: PSV
- Clasps: None
- Status: Currently awarded
- Established: 2000
- Ribbon bar

Precedence
- Next (higher): Riviresa Campaign Services Medal
- Equivalent: Karyakshama Seva Vibhushanaya (Sri Lanka Army)
- Next (lower): Prashansaniya Seva Padakkama

The Prashansaniya Seva Vibhushanaya (PSV, Commendable Service Order) (Sinhala: ප්‍රසංශනීය සේවා විභූෂණය prasanṣanīya sēvā vibhūṣaṇaya) is a military decoration awarded to officers of the Sri Lanka Volunteer Naval Force in recognition of excellent service. Inaugurated on 31 January 2000, the medal does not confer any individual precedence. It is equivalent to the Reserve Decoration of the Royal Navy, volunteer officers of the Ceylon Royal Naval Volunteer Reserve had been awarded the Decoration for Officers of the Royal Naval Volunteer Reserve from 1938 to 1950.

== Award process ==
All commissioned officers of the SLNVF are eligible for this award, provided they have completed 18 years of "long, meritorious, loyal, valuable, service and unblemished conduct" by or after 22 May 1972.

Recipients are entitled to use the post-nominal letters "PSV".

== See also ==
- Karyakshama Seva Vibhushanaya
- Prashansaniya Seva Padakkama
