= Ceylon Armed Services Inauguration Medal =

Service award

- Type: Commemorative medal
- Awarded for: Service
- Presented by: Ceylon
- Eligibility: All ranks of the Ceylon armed services in active service during the 1949-1951 period
- Clasps: None
- Status: No longer awarded
- Established: July 1955
- First award: 1955
- Ribbon bar

Precedence
- Next (higher): Karyakshama Seva Vibhushanaya; Prashansaniya Seva Padakkama (Sri Lanka); Pakistan Medal (United Kingdom)
- Next (lower): Sri Lanka Army Volunteer Force Centenary Medal (Sri Lanka); Ceylon Police Independence Medal (United Kingdom)

The Ceylon Armed Services Inauguration Medal was awarded to members of the Ceylon armed services who served within their specific service branch during periods in 1949-1951 when their service branch was established:

- Ceylon Army (10 October 1949)
- Royal Ceylon Navy (9 December 1950)
- Royal Ceylon Air Force (2 March 1951).
