= Sri Lanka Army Volunteer Force Centenary Medal =

- Medal, obverse (left) and reverse (right)
- Type: Commemorative medal
- Awarded for: Service during the SLAVF centenary
- Description: Suspended from a plain suspension bar
- Presented by: Sri Lanka
- Eligibility: All ranks of the Sri Lanka Army Volunteer Force
- Status: No longer awarded
- Established: 1981
- First award: 1981
- Final award: 1981
- Ribbon bar

Precedence
- Next (higher): Ceylon Armed Services Inauguration Medal
- Next (lower): United Nations Medal (UN)

The Sri Lanka Army Volunteer Force Centenary Medal was a commemorative medal awarded to all ranks of the Sri Lanka Army Volunteer Force in active service during the centenary of the force's establishment, in 1981.
