= President's Inauguration Medal =

- Type: Commemorative medal
- Awarded for: Service
- Description: Suspended from a plain suspension bar
- Presented by: Sri Lanka
- Eligibility: All regular ranks of the Sri Lanka Army, Sri Lanka Navy and Sri Lanka Air Force
- Clasps: None
- Status: No longer awarded
- Established: 1978
- First award: 1978
- Final award: 1978
- Ribbon bar

Precedence
- Next (higher): Sri Lanka Armed Services Long Service Medal
- Next (lower): 50th Independence Anniversary Commemoration Medal

The President's Inauguration Medal (Sinhala: ජනාධිපති ධූරප්‍රාප්ත පදක්කම janādhipathi dhūraprāptha padakkama) was a decoration of the Military of Sri Lanka, granted to all regular servicepersons of the country's armed services in service on 4 February 1978, following a formal recommendation by the tri-service commanders. The decoration commemorated the inauguration of the first executive president of Sri Lanka, J. R. Jayewardene.
