= Desha Puthra Sammanaya =

- Medal, reverse
- Type: Wound Medal
- Awarded for: Being wounded- classified as being 'moderately severe'- in action against the enemy, and/or death through such injury
- Description: Suspended from a plain suspension bar
- Presented by: Sri Lanka
- Eligibility: All ranks of the regular and volunteer servicepersons of the Military of Sri Lanka
- Clasps: None
- Status: Currently awarded
- First award: 1972
- Ribbon bar

Precedence
- Next (higher): 50th Independence Anniversary Commemoration Medal
- Next (lower): Sewabhimani Padakkama
- Related: Desha Puthra Padakkama

The Desha Puthra Sammanaya (Sinhala: දේශ පුත්‍ර සම්මානය dēśa putra sammānaya; Son of the Nation Award) is a military decoration awarded as a wound medal to servicepersons of the Military of Sri Lanka, equivalent to the United States Purple Heart. The Sri Lanka Police awards an equivalent, related award for its service personnel.

== Award process ==
All servicepersons of the regular and volunteer armed forces of Sri Lanka are eligible for the award, provided they have been wounded in a manner that is classified 'moderately severe' in action against the enemy, or died as a result of such an injury. Individuals must be formally recommended by their service commander, and the decoration is awarded following a review process.
