= Vadamarachchi Operation Medal =

- Medal, obverse
- Type: Campaign medal
- Awarded for: Active involvement in the Vadamarachchi Operation
- Description: Suspended from a plain suspension bar
- Presented by: Sri Lanka
- Eligibility: All ranks of the regular and volunteer forces of the Military of Sri Lanka, and civilians
- Campaign: Vadamarachchi Operation
- Clasps: None
- Status: No longer awarded
- Established: 1987
- Ribbon bar

Precedence
- Next (higher): Purna Bhumi Padakkama
- Next (lower): Riviresa Campaign Services Medal

The Vadamarachchi Operation Medal (Sinhala: වඩමාරච්චි මෙහෙයුම් පදක්කම vadamārachchi meheyum padakkama) was a campaign medal presented to all ranks of the regular and volunteer forces of the Military of Sri Lanka that served in the Vadamarachchi Operation (26 May 1987 to June 1987), the last major campaign carried out by the Sri Lankan military as part of Eelam War I before the arrival of the Indian Peace Keeping Force in Sri Lanka. The award was also awarded to civilians that aided in the operation.

== Award process ==
The decoration was presented by the President, following recommendations from field- and service commanders. Eligibility criteria for the award were:

- active involvement in military operations in the Vadamarachchi area,
- active involvement in the administration of the operation, assisting troops in the forward battle areas, regardless of the location from which these duties were carried out,
- contributions by military personnel outside the Vadamarachchi operational area to the operation,
- active involvement (military or civil) in the planning of the operation present in the Jaffna Peninsula during the course of the operation,
- provision of medical support and care to casualties of the operation during the operational period (military or civil).
