= Videsha Seva Padakkama =

- Medal, reverse
- Type: Service medal
- Awarded for: Active sanctioned service in territories outside Sri Lanka
- Description: Suspended from a plain suspension bar
- Presented by: Sri Lanka
- Eligibility: All regular and volunteer ranks of the tri-services
- Clasps: None
- Status: Currently awarded
- Established: 1981
- Ribbon bar

Precedence
- Next (higher): Uththama Seva Padakkama
- Next (lower): Republic of Sri Lanka Armed Services Medal

The Videsha Seva Padakkama (VSP, Foreign Service Medal) (Sinhala: විදේශ සේවා පදක්කම vidēsha sevā padakkama) is awarded for:

...active service outside the territorial limits of the Island provided such service is connected with active service in a Foreign Military Mission or Campaign or in the defence of Sri Lanka or for service connected with military or peace keeping operations conducted under the auspices of the United Nations Organization...

—
