= Sewabhimani Padakkama =

Sri Lankan military Meritorious Service Medal

- Medal, obverse (left) and reverse (right)
- Type: Service medal
- Awarded for: Service to the nation following the end of the Sri Lankan Civil War
- Description: Suspended from a plain suspension bar
- Presented by: Sri Lanka
- Eligibility: All ranks of the regular and volunteer servicepersons of the Military of Sri Lanka, including civilian staff. All ranks of the Sri Lanka Police
- Clasps: None
- Status: Currently awarded
- First award: 2019
- Ribbon bar

Precedence
- Next (higher): Desha Putra Sammanaya
- Next (lower): Sewa Padakkama

The Sewabhimani Padakkama (Sinhala: සේවාභිමානී පදක්කම; Meritorious Service Medal) is a service medal awarded to servicepersons of the Military of Sri Lanka, for services to the nation and its development following the conclusion of the Sri Lankan Civil War in May 2009.

== Award process ==
All servicepersons of the regular and volunteer armed forces of Sri Lanka (including civilian staffers) and police service are eligible for the award, provided they have served for an uninterrupted period of at least six years from 19 May 2009, excluding the basic training period with a good conduct.

It is ordained that the medal shall be granted to the Minister of Defence, the State Minister of Defence, the Secretary of Defence of the Democratic Socialist Republic of Sri Lanka and all Ranks of the Regular and Volunteer Forces of the Army, Navy and Air Force of the Democratic Socialist Republic of Sri Lanka, and members of the Sri Lanka Police, for the valuable contribution made since 19.05.2009 for the post-war activities, count not less than Six years of aggregate service excluding the basic training period with a good conduct and the permanent civil staff members with Six Years of aggregate service in Armed Services and Affiliates of the Sri Lanka Police subject to the regulations hereinafter made.
