= 75th Independence Day Commemoration Medal =

- Type: Commemorative medal
- Awarded for: Service
- Presented by: Sri Lanka
- Eligibility: All regular and volunteer ranks of the Sri Lanka Armed Forces and officers of the National Cadet Corps in active service on 1 February 2023
- Clasps: None
- Status: No longer awarded
- Established: 2023
- First award: 2023
- Final award: 2023
- Ribbon bar

Precedence
- Next (higher): Sri Lanka Army 50th Anniversary Medal
- Next (lower): Ceylon Armed Services Long Service Medal

The 75th Independence Day Commemoration Medal was a commemorative medal awarded to the servicepersons of all actively serving ranks (including those undergoing basic training) on 1 February 2023 in both the regular and volunteer forces in the Sri Lanka Armed Forces and officers of the National Cadet Corps to commemorate the 75th anniversary of Sri Lanka's Independence from the United Kingdom, on the 4 February 2023. A formal recommendation from service commanders was required for the award of the medal.

== See also ==
- 50th Independence Anniversary Commemoration Medal
