= Northern Humanitarian Operations Medal =

- Type: Campaign medal
- Awarded for: Involvement in operations on the Northern Theatre of Eelam War IV
- Description: Suspended from a plain suspension bar
- Presented by: Sri Lanka
- Eligibility: All ranks of the regular and volunteer forces of the Military of Sri Lanka and Sri Lanka Police, and civilians
- Campaign: Eelam War IV
- Clasps: One
- Status: No longer awarded
- Established: 2010
- Ribbon bar

Precedence
- Next (higher): Eastern Humanitarian Operations Medal
- Next (lower): North and East Operations Medal

The Northern Humanitarian Operations Medal was a Sri Lankan campaign medal for action during Eelam War IV, presented to:

- The Minister of Defence, the Deputy Minister of Defence, the Defence Secretary, Service Commanders and the Inspector General of Police, by virtue of their appointments,
- All service personnel on active service during the period covering 26 February 2007 – 18 May 2009 and had been formally recommended by their service commanders,
- All police personnel who served in the Eastern theatre of operations during the specified period and formally recommended by the Inspector General of Police,
- Civilians employed by the armed services who served in the Eastern theatre during the specified period and formally recommended by the relevant authority, and
- Civilian medical staff employed by the armed services who were physically present in the Eastern theatre for a minimum period of seven days during the specified period and had been formally recommended by the relevant authority.

A clasp was awarded to:

- The Minister of Defence, the Deputy Minister of Defence, the Defence Secretary, Service Commanders and the Inspector General of Police, by virtue of their appointments,
- All service personnel that took part in combat, fire support, logistics, medical services, planning, direction or other related activities during the military actions in the Eastern theatre for a minimum of 90 days during the period specified. The 90-day minimum was waived for Army, Navy and Air Force personnel that sustained casualties during the 90-day period, and
- Air Force and Navy personnel not physically present in the Eastern theatre (restricted to combat or logistics-related activities, with a service period decided on by their service commanders).

The clasp is denoted by a silver color disk on the ribbon bar.

== See also ==
- Eastern Humanitarian Operations Medal
