= 50th Independence Anniversary Commemoration Medal =

- Medal, obverse
- Type: Commemorative medal
- Awarded for: Service
- Presented by: Sri Lanka
- Eligibility: All regular and volunteer ranks of the Military of Sri Lanka in active service on 4 February 1998
- Clasps: None
- Status: No longer awarded
- Established: 1998
- First award: 1998
- Final award: 1998
- Ribbon bar

Precedence
- Next (higher): President's Inauguration Medal
- Next (lower): Desha Putra Sammanaya

The 50th Independence Anniversary Commemoration Medal (Sinhala: ස්වර්ණ ජයන්ති පදක්කම swarna jayanthi padakkama) was a military decoration awarded by the Military of Sri Lanka to servicepersons of all actively serving ranks in both the regular and volunteer forces in commemoration of the 50th anniversary of Sri Lanka's Independence from the United Kingdom, on the 4 February 1998. A formal recommendation from service commanders was required for the award of the medal.

== See also ==
- 75th Independence Day Commemoration Medal
