= Sri Lanka Armed Services Long Service Medal =

- Medal, obverse
- Type: Service medal
- Awarded for: 12 years of continuous service with impeccable character and discipline
- Description: Suspended from a plain suspension bar
- Presented by: Sri Lanka
- Eligibility: All ranks of the Sri Lanka Army, Sri Lanka Navy and Sri Lanka Air Force.
- Clasps: Awarded to service personnel on 20 years of service
- Status: Currently awarded
- Established: 1979 (Superseded the Ceylon Armed Services Long Service Medal)
- Ribbon bar

Precedence
- Next (higher): Ceylon Armed Services Long Service Medal
- Next (lower): President's Inauguration Medal

The Sri Lanka Armed Services Long Service Medal (Sinhala: ශ්‍රී ලංකා සන්නද්ධ සේවා දීර්ඝ සේවා පදක්කම Śrī Laṃkā ārakśaka sēvā dhīrgha sēvā padakkama) is a service award presented to all ranks of the tri-forces of Sri Lanka. Service personnel are eligible for the award on the completion of 12 years' continuous (desertion or absence without leave act as disqualifiers) service with perfect character and discipline.

== Criteria ==
General officers commanding/area commanders/commanding officers forward recommendations to service commanders. Reserve- or volunteer forces may qualify for this award provided that their service periods add up to 12 years. This award replaced the Ceylon Armed Services Long Service Medal in 1979 when Sri Lanka became a republic.

== Sri Lanka Armed Services Long Service Clasp (1979) ==
A clasp is awarded to service personnel on completing 20 years' continuous service with the same character quality and disciplinary record required for award of the medal. The clasp is denoted by a silver color disk on the ribbon bar.
