= Uththama Seva Padakkama =

Uttama Seva Padakkama
- Medal, obverse
- Type: Service medal
- Awarded for: Dedication to duty with at least 15 years of continuous service with perfect disciplinary and service record
- Description: Suspended from a plain suspension bar
- Presented by: Sri Lanka
- Eligibility: All regular ranks of the Military of Sri Lanka
- Post-nominals: USP
- Clasps: None
- Status: Currently awarded
- Established: 1981
- Ribbon bar

Precedence
- Next (higher): Vishista Seva Vibhushanaya
- Next (lower): Videsha Seva Padakkama

The Uttama Seva Padakkama (USP, Meritorious Service Medal) (Sinhala: උත්තම සේවා පදක්කම uṭṭama sēvā padakkama) is presented to all ranks of the regular forces of the Sri Lankan military for:

...valuable service and devotion to duty marked by exceptional ability, merit and exemplary conduct provided they count not less than 15 years continuous and uninterrupted service and possess and unblemished record of moral and military conduct...

—

== Award process ==
The decoration is awarded at the National Day parade by the President after a recommendation and review process. Recipients can use the post-nominal letters "USP".

== See also ==
- Karyakshama Seva Padakkama
