= North and East Operations Medal =

- Medal, reverse
- Type: Military decoration
- Awarded for: Service
- Description: Suspended from a plain suspension bar
- Presented by: Sri Lanka
- Eligibility: All ranks of the regular and volunteer forces of the Military of Sri Lanka and Sri Lanka Police
- Clasps: Maximum of 2
- Status: Currently awarded
- Established: 1983
- Ribbon bar

Precedence
- Next (higher): Northern Humanitarian Operations Medal
- Next (lower): Purna Bhumi Padakkama

The North and East Operations Medal (Sinhala: උතුරු නැගෙනහිර සංග්‍රාමික පදක්කම uthuru nægenahira sangrāmika padakkama) was a decoration presented to servicepersons of the Military of Sri Lanka and Sri Lanka Police for service in the country's Northern and Eastern provinces during the course of the Sri Lankan Civil War between 23 July 1982 and 1 January 2010.

== Eligibility ==
General requirements for eligibility, particularly applicable to members of the Sri Lanka Air Force and Sri Lanka Police, were 3 years of cumulative service in the two provinces between the 23 July 1982 and 1 January 2010. Army personnel are subject to a more specific set of rules, requiring 3 years of cumulative service in:

- Districts of Jaffna, Vavuniya, Kilinochchi, Mullaitivu, Mannar, Batticaloa, Trincomalee and Ampara,
- Divisional secretarial divisions of Nochchiyagama, Nuwaragampalatha (Central) and Wilachchiya of Anuradhapura District,
- Divisional secretarial divisions of Kalpitiya, Wanathawilluwa and Karuwalagaswewa of Puttalam District,
- Divisional secretarial divisions of Dimbulagala ana Kankapura of Polonnaruwa District

to be considered eligible. Similarly, naval personnel are required to have served in:

- Eastern Naval Area,
- Northern Naval Area,
- North Central Naval Area,
- SLNS Vijaya (since 1 January 1997)

to be eligible for the award.

As with other Sri Lankan military decorations, individuals required a formal recommendation from their immediate superiors and service commander to be considered for award. Shorter service (180 days) in these operational areas allowed for the grant of the Purna Bhumi Padakkama.

=== Clasps ===
A maximum of two clasps could also be awarded with the first for a cumulative 5-year service period and a second for a cumulative 10-year service period, subject to the rules of the service branch in question. Each clasp is denoted by a silver color disk on the ribbon bar.
