= Purna Bhumi Padakkama =

- Medal, reverse
- Type: Military decoration
- Awarded for: Service
- Description: Suspended from a plain suspension bar
- Presented by: Sri Lanka
- Eligibility: All ranks of the regular- and volunteer forces of the Military of Sri Lanka and service personnel of the Sri Lanka Police
- Status: Currently awarded
- Established: 1983
- Final award: 1 January 2010
- Ribbon bar

Precedence
- Next (higher): North and East Operations Medal
- Next (lower): Vadamarachchi Operation Medal

The Purna Bhumi Padakkama (Sinhala: පූර්ණ භූමි පදක්කම pūrna bhūmi padakkama) was a service medal awarded by the Military of Sri Lanka (regular and volunteer) and Sri Lanka Police to all ranks of its forces in recognition of service in various districts that were regarded as theaters of the Sri Lankan Civil War between 22 July 1977 to 1 January 2010.

== Eligibility ==
All ranks of the Army, Navy, Air Force and Police who had served at least 180 days in the following districts were eligible for the award.

- Jaffna District (since 22 July 1977), or
- Vavuniya District, Kilinochchi District, Mullaitivu District, Mannar District, Batticaloa District, Trincomalee District or Ampara District (since 16 September 1983).

Longer duration of service in operational areas were recognized by the North and East Operations Medal.
