= Riviresa Campaign Services Medal =

- Medal, obverse
- Type: Campaign medal
- Awarded for: Active involvement in Operation Riviresa
- Description: Suspended from a plain suspension bar
- Presented by: Sri Lanka
- Eligibility: All ranks of the regular and volunteer forces of the Military of Sri Lanka, Sri Lanka Police, and civilians
- Campaign: Operation Riviresa
- Clasps: None
- Status: No longer awarded
- Established: 1996
- Ribbon bar

Precedence
- Next (higher): Vadamarachchi Operation Medal
- Next (lower): Karyakshama Seva Vibhushanaya (Army Volunteers); Prashansaniya Seva Vibhushanaya (Navy Volunteers)

The Riviresa Campaign Services Medal (Sinhala: රිවිරැස මෙහෙයුම් පදක්කම riviræsa meheyum padakkama) was a campaign medal presented to all ranks of the regular and volunteer forces of the Military of Sri Lanka, Sri Lanka Police, as well as civilians that were involved in planning or assisting Operation Riviresa (17 October 1995 - 5 December 1995), one of the most notable successes of the Sri Lankan forces during Eelam War III.

This medal is one among few awarded to a serving senior political appointee, having been awarded to the Deputy Minister of Defence at the time, Col. (later Gen. Anuruddha Ratwatte.

== Award process ==
The decoration was presented by the President, following recommendations from field- and service commanders. All actively serving military and police servicepersons, military- and civilian medical staff and civilians employed by the armed forces in any non-military capacity (involved in planning the Operation and present in the Jaffna Peninsula during the Operation, for instance) were all eligible to receive the award. In addition, the Deputy Minister of Defence, Service Commanders and the Inspector General of Police were awarded the decoration, by virtue of their appointments.

A clasp was awarded to all ranks of the tri-services that participated in combat, fire support, logistics, medical support, planning, direction or other related services during the operation within their given operational location for a minimum of 25 days. The 25-day minimum was waived if the serviceperson was a combat casualty during the course of the operation. The clasp was also awarded to the Deputy Minister of Defence, Service Commanders and the Inspector General of Police, by virtue of their appointments.
