= K. G. Shantha =

Sri Lanka navy Chief Petty Officer

Chief Petty Officer K. G. Shantha † PWV
- කේ. ජී. ශාන්ත
- Born: August 4, 1979
- Died: 1 November 2008 (aged 29); Point Pedro, Sri Lanka
- Military career
- Allegiance: Sri Lanka
- Branch: Sri Lanka Navy
- Service years: Unknown – 2008
- Rank: Chief Petty Officer
- Service number: XX 31243
- Unit: Special Boat Squadron
- Awards: Parama Weera Vibhushanaya

K. G. Shantha (Sinhala: කේ. ජී. ශාන්ත; 4 August 1979 – 1 November 2008) was a senior non-commissioned officer in the Sri Lanka Navy. He was killed in a sea battle against the Sea Tigers, the naval wing of the Liberation Tigers of Tamil Eelam, in the seas of northern Sri Lanka. He was posthumously awarded the Parama Weera Vibhushanaya, the country's highest honour for gallantry, and is the second recipient of the medal from the navy.

== Personal life ==
Shantha was born to K. G. Gunathilaka and R. M. Dollienona, and resided in Norwood, Hatton. He was married at the time of his death, to R. M. S. R. Dissanayake. Shantha joined Sri Lanka navy in 2002.

== Action on 1 November 2008 ==
The battle took place off the coast of Point Pedro.

On the dawn of 1 November 2008 at approximately 5.45 am, a battle erupted between the navy and a group of Sea Tiger boats off the coast between Point Pedro and Nagar Kovil, near the northern tip of Sri Lanka. At the time, Shantha was a Petty Officer in the navy's elite Special Boat Squadron (SBS). He was in command of the Arrow-class patrol boat Z-142, which was armed with a 23-mm autocannon and two machine guns, and was part of the navy group engaged in the battle.

Shantha and his crew engaged the Sea Tiger vessels, using the high maneuverability of the Z-142 to their advantage. However, all three gunners were eventually incapacitated, and Shantha was left unable to attack the enemy boats now approaching the navy's larger vessels. A Sea Tiger suicide boat was heading towards the P-164, a Colombo-Class fast attack craft of the 4th Fast Attack Flotilla carrying 10 sailors. Seeing this, Shantha maneuvered the Z-142 into the path of the suicide boat and rammed it. He was killed in the resulting explosion which obliterated the suicide boat and the Z-142 with it, but the P-164 and its crew were spared.

The outcome of the battle is unclear, as both sides claimed victory. The Sea Tigers claimed that they had sunk two navy vessels and forced them to retreat, while the navy claimed that they successfully repelled the attack and destroyed at least four Sea Tiger vessels with the assistance of the air force.

== Recognition ==
Shantha was promoted posthumously to the rank of Chief Petty Officer. On 16 December 2011, a house was donated to his family, which was constructed by the Naval Engineering Division with funding from First Lady Shiranthi Rajapaksa.

He was recommended for the Parama Weera Vibhushanaya, the country's highest military award for gallantry, for his actions on 1 November 2008. The decision to award the medal to Shantha and 14 others was announced in The Sri Lanka Gazette on 16 May 2012. The award was presented to his next-of-kin three days later, on 19 May 2012, by Mahinda Rajapaksa, the President of Sri Lanka, at a ceremony held at the celebrations marking the third anniversary of the end of the war. The citation for Shantha's Parama Weera Vibhushanaya commends him as a "bold sailor [who] commanded his craft in the midst of danger, using his instinct and wisdom, encouraging his fellow sailors, disregarding the risk to own life and security, with the objective of safeguarding thereby the lives of his comrades."

Shantha was the second recipient of the Parama Weera Vibhushanaya from the navy, after Lieutenant Commander Jude Wijethunge who received it posthumously for similar actions in 1996.
