= Thisara Samarasinghe =

Sri Lankan navy admiral

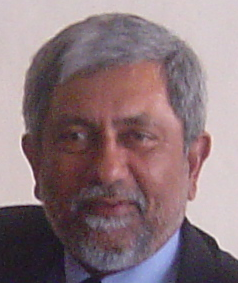
- Admiral Thisara Samarasinghe
- Born: 16 July 1955 (age 71)
- Military career
- Allegiance: Sri Lanka
- Branch: Sri Lanka Navy
- Service years: 1973 - 2011
- Rank: Admiral
- Service number: NRX 0075
- Unit: 4th Fast Attack Flotilla
- Commands: Commander of the Sri Lanka Navy; Chief of Naval Staff
- Conflicts: Sri Lankan Civil War
- Awards: Rana Sura Padakkama; Vishista Seva Vibhushanaya; Uttama Seva Padakkama
- Other work: Sri Lankan High Commissioner to Australia

Admiral Thisara Sugeeshwara Gunasekara Samarasinghe RSP, VSV, USP, ndc, psc, DISS, MNI, SLN (born: 16 July 1955) is Sri Lankan retired navy admiral and was the Commander of the Sri Lankan Navy from 15 July 2008 to 15 January 2011. He had a distinguished 36-year career in the Sri Lankan Navy. His career included a wide range of key appointments at sea and ashore, including training in the United Kingdom, India and the United States.

Samarasinghe is currently serving as Sri Lanka’s High Commissioner to Australia, a position he has held since 28 July 2011.

== Personal life and education ==
Born to Francis Samarasinghe a civil servant and Umawathie Samarasinghe a teacher, Samarasinghe was educated at the Royal College, Colombo.

He won Royal College Colours in Athletics as a sprinter. In 1970, at Cadetting, he had the distinction of being lance corporal in Royal Platoon 1 that won the prestigious Herman Loos Trophy. He achieved the highest position of regimental sergeant major (RSM) of the National Cadet Corps (Sri Lanka) in 1973. He also won the Best Commander’s Prize in 1972 receiving the award from Prime Minister Sirimavo Bandaranaike. Finally Samarasinghe was selected as a senior prefect of Royal College. On leaving school, Samarasinghe joined Lever Brothers as a Trainee Executive. Three months later he left the Company and joined the Sri Lanka Navy as an officer cadet and thus began a voyage that brought him to the pinnacle.

Samarasinghe is married to Malathie, an educationist, with a daughter Nadeesha and a son Harith.

== Naval career ==
=== Career outline ===
Samarasinghe joined the Sri Lanka Navy after completing school as an Officer Cadet winning the Sword of Honour in the 4th intake at the Naval & Maritime Academy, Trincomalee in 1974. He went on to complete his basic training at Britannia Royal Naval College, Dartmouth as a Midshipmen and graduated in 1976 winning the Best International Midshipman Award along with appointment as Divisional Sub Lieutenant. On his return he specialized as a navigator, attending Navigation and Direction School, INS Venduruthy in India where he graduated securing the 1st place in order of merit.

He had served on board Short Patrol Craft, Long Patrol Craft and in command of one of the first two Dvora - Mk I Fast Attack Crafts in 1985 that would later make up the 4th Fast Attack Flotilla. Thereafter he served on board Fast Gun Boats of the 3rd Fast Gun Boats Squadron and the Surveillance Command Tender and Surveillance Command Ship (then the Flagship) of the 7th Surveillance Command Squadron. During this time he counted seven years of service at sea, out which four and half was in command at sea.

In 1991, he graduated with distinction from the Naval Staff College (Class 38) at the Naval War College Newport, Rhode Island, USA. There after he went on to hold several shore commands that included a naval base in the northern naval area and of two training establishments. He had also served in several Staff and Deputy Director/Director appointments at Naval Headquarters. In 1998 he was the Aide de Camp (ADC) to HRH Prince of Wales, a fellow graduate of Britannia Royal Naval College, during his state visit to Sri Lanka for 50th Anniversary Independence Day Celebrations.

As a commodore he was posted as the deputy area commander of the Northern Naval Area, Eastern Naval Area and Southern Naval Area, before he was appointed commander of the Southern Naval Area in 2002. He was appointed as the first director of general services in 2004 while concurrently holding the appointments of director of naval projects and plans; naval assistant to Commander of the Navy and principal staff officer of the Joint Operations Headquarters under the Chief of Defence Staff.

In 2005, he graduated from the prestigious Indian National Defence College, New Delhi (45th Course). His thesis was on “Strategy to Defeat Maritime Terrorism”, and he wrote the seminar paper on Indo - Sri Lanka “Sustainable Cooperative Security Challenges and Options” at National Maritime Foundation.

Promoted to rear admiral in December 2005, he was appointed as acting commander of Northern Naval Area, before he was appointed as the director general naval operations in 2006 overseeing the anti arms smuggling operations that led to the distraction of several LTTE gun-running ships in the Indian Ocean. Thereafter in 2007 he served as commander of the Eastern Naval Area during Eastern operations and in 2008, commander of the Northern Naval Area during Northern offensive.

Samarasinghe has led naval delegations to India, Russia, Israel and the US on bilateral issues. He was also selected to be a member of presidential and prime ministerial delegations on state visits to Indonesia (2006) and Libya (2008) respectively.

In May 2008, Samarasinghe was appointed Chief of Staff of the Navy. On July 15, 2008, he was made commander of the navy and promoted to the rank of vice admiral.

On January 12, 2011, he was promoted to the rank of admiral and retired three days later.

=== Speaker at the 19th Seapower Symposium ===
While serving as the Commander of the Sri Lankan Navy, Samarasinghe was invited by the United States Navy Chief, Admiral Gary Roughead to participate at the 19th International Seapower Symposium conducted by the United States Navy at the Naval War College, Newport, Rhode Island, held from 6 to 9 October 2009. Samarasinghe, who was incidentally a distinguished graduate of the same Naval War College, having attended the Naval Staff Course in 1991, was further recognized and honoured when he was invited by the United States Navy Chief to address the forum attended by 96 heads of navies and naval delegates of 20 countries.

This was the first time that such a rare honour has been bestowed to Sri Lanka in general and the Sri Lanka Navy in particular. Samarasinghe's address earned high praise by the Chief of the United States Navy and all others present at the symposium, where he encapsulated the way ahead for 'Leveraging Cooperative Effort to Enhance Maritime Security Operations' by using a seven-step approach.

=== Organising 60th-anniversary celebration of the navy ===
Sri Lanka Navy under the leadership of Samarasinghe created history when 19 navies around the globe, including 5 permanent members of United Nations, visited Sri Lanka at the invitation of Samarasinghe to participate at the 60th-anniversary celebration of the Sri Lanka Navy 7 to 11 December 2010 honouring Sri Lanka. Naval chiefs of Australia, Bangladesh, India, Pakistan and UAE were on the same platform in Colombo for three days during the three main events attended by Mahinda Rajapaksa the President of Sri Lanka. The presidential fleet review too was represented by large warships of Bangladesh, China, India, Iran, Pakistan, Russia and Thailand showcasing that Sri Lanka’s port of Colombo was a comfortable venue for such diversified representation, which is considered an unprecedented achievement.

=== Awards and commendations ===
Samarasinghe was awarded Rana Sura Padakkama (RSP) for gallantry in combat, the service medals Vishista Seva Vibhushanaya (VSV) in recognition of his devotion and dedication to the country with and unblemished career record, Uttama Seva Padakkama (USP) for meritorious and distinguished service, the Sri Lanka Armed Services Long Service Medal and other medals that include the Purna Bhumi Padakkama and the North and East Operations Medal. Samarasinghe is a recipient of 5 commendation letters from four commanders of the navy for his outstanding performance throughout the long career.

As director general for operations, at the Navy HQ, Samarasinghe successfully completed medical evacuations by sea that took place on 10 and 12 February 2009. This complex naval operation was performed during the final phase of the war and helped to save many people’s lives. In a letter dated 14 February 2009, Paul Castella the head of the International Committee of Red Cross (ICRC) in Sri Lanka, commended the efforts of director general for operations and his team. The letter stated, ‘Your men, either at sea or on land, succeeded in an exemplary manner to carry out their essential task to protect the State and its citizen and simultaneously to care for the sick and wounded. They displayed a strict discipline and respect of rules of engagement and at the same time very respectful and kind attitudes to help those in need.’

In July 2010, Samarasinghe was presented with a certificate of appreciation of the Government of Australia for the support and assistance rendered by efficient methods adopted to prevent human smuggling from the shore of Sri Lanka.

== Diplomatic service ==
In May 2011, Samarasinghe was appointed as Sri Lanka's High Commissioner to Australia and commenced official duties from 28 July 2011.

On 5 September 2011, speaking at the Australian Institute of International Affairs (AIIA), High Commissioner Samarasinghe stated that despite allegations made by various parties regarding the denial of humanitarian assistance to the people of the North of Sri Lanka during the last phase of the conflict, he was personally involved in coordinating the delivery of humanitarian assistance during that period. Mr Ian Dudgeon, President of AIIA (ACT) said that the High Commissioner was an officer with a distinguished naval career and has received commendations for his conduct from international agencies such as the ICRC during the final offensives against the Tamil Tigers.

In October 2011, while serving as High Commissioner to Australia, Samarasinghe was accused of war crimes by the International Commission of Jurists for his role in the final offensives against the Tamil Tigers. However, the Australian Federal Police dismissed these war crimes allegations. On 18 July 2012, a spokeswomen for the Federal Police stated the International Commission of Jurists was advised of this decision on March 3, 2012.

== See also ==
- List of Sri Lankan non-career diplomats

Military offices
Preceded by Wasantha Karannagoda	Commander of the Sri Lankan Navy; July 15, 2008–January 15, 2011	Succeeded by D. W. A. S. Dissanayake
