= Rohan Amarasinghe =

Sri Lankan rear admiral (born 1959)

Rear Admiral AR Amarasinghe
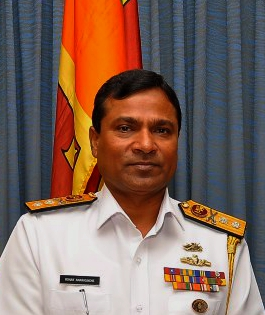
- Born: 17 November 1959 (age 66)
- Education: De Mazenod College
- Military career
- Allegiance: Sri Lanka
- Branch: Sri Lanka Navy
- Service years: 1980-2014
- Rank: Rear Admiral
- Service number: NRX 0183
- Commands: Commander Eastern Naval Area, Commander Western Naval Area, Commandant Volunteer Naval Force, Commander North Central Naval Area, Director General Personnel and Training, Commander Southern Naval Area, Director Naval Operations, Director Naval Rapid Action Boat Squadron, Director Naval Intelligence, Director Naval Land Operations, Director Naval Weapons, Commanding Officer SLNS Sayura, Naval Media Spokesman
- Conflicts: Sri Lankan Civil War Operation Thrividha Balaya
- Awards: Rana Sura Padakkama, Vishista Seva Vibhushanaya, Uttama Seva Padakkama

Anthony Rohan Amarasinghe, RSP, VSV, USP, psc, MNI, SLN is a retired Sri Lankan admiral. He served as the Director of Naval Rapid Action Boat Squadron, Director Naval Operations, Commander Southern Naval Area (ComSouth), Director General Personnel and Training, Commander North Central Naval Area (ComNorCen), Commander Western Naval Area (ComWest) and Commander Eastern Naval Area (ComEast). He retired from active service in 2014 upon reaching the mandatory retirement age of 55 for Sri Lankan Armed Forces personnel. At the time of his retirement, he was the third most senior executive officer behind Commander of the Navy and the Chief of Staff.

== Naval career ==
Rear Admiral Anthony Rohan Amarasinghe joined the Sri Lanka Navy on 1 November 1980 as an officer cadet of the 9th Intake at the Naval & Maritime Academy Trincomalee. He followed his basic training at Naval & Maritime Academy Trincomalee from 1980 to 1983 and Sub Lieutenant Technical course at INS Venduruthy, India in 1983/84 with outstanding performances in Academics as well as in sports. Rear Admiral Rohan Amarasinghe is a specialized gunner, graduated from gunnery school of INS Dronacharya at Kochi (1989), India securing higher place in order of merit. He followed International Principal Warfare Officer (IPWO) Course at the School of Maritime Operations, HMS Dryad in United Kingdom (1988). He successfully completed the Naval Intelligence International Officer Practical Course at the Fleet Intelligence Training Center Pacific and International Combat Information Officer Course at the Expeditionary Warfare Training Group Pacific, San Diego in United States of America in 2002. He has been conferred with two diplomas in International Relations and Conflict resolution from the Bandaranaike International Diplomatic Training Institute. He represented the Commander of the Navy at the RAN Seapower Conference 2013 & International Fleet Review in Sydney organized by the Royal Australian Navy and was a guest speaker at the Offshore Patrol Vessels conference (2014) in Dublin, organized by the Defence Forces of Ireland. He is also an alumnus of Near East Asia Center for Strategic Studies and of Army War College, Mhow.

He held most important staff and Command appointments of Sri Lanka Navy both afloat and ashore. He served as the Officer In charge of Fast Attack Crafts P 453 and P 465, Commanding Officer of SLNS Ranadheera (Commissioning Commanding Officer), SLNS Pabbatha and the former flagship of the Sri Lanka Navy, SLNS Sayura. Under his command, SLNS Sayura took part in IMDEX Asia 2005 expo held in Singapore. He was also the Commanding Officer of the shore establishments SLNS Gajaba, SLNS Dakshina, SLNS Parakrama, SLNS Rangalla, SLN Dockyard. In addition, he held the posts of Naval Media Spokesman, Director Naval Weapons, Director Naval Land Operations, Director Naval Intelligence, Deputy Area Commander of Northern Naval Area, Director Naval Rapid Action Boat Squadron, Director Naval Operations, Commander Southern Naval Area, Director General Personnel and Training, Commander North Central Naval Area and Commander Western Naval Area prior to his final appointment as the Commander Eastern Naval Area.

== Operation Thrivida Balaya ==
During the joint mission by the Sri Lankan Armed forces to break the siege at the Jaffna Fort on 13 September 1990, Lt. Rohan Amarasinghe led a team of 6 officers and 60 sailors along with 20 fibreglass dinghies to transport 240 troops across the Jaffna lagoon in Operation Thrividha Balaya. His team consisted of sub-lieutenants Noel Kalubowila, U S R Perera, H R P Gunawardena, W D E M Sudarshana, Pujitha Vithana and A S L Gamage. Lt. Chanaka Rupasinghe (injured during the operation) was occupying an FDG with a specialist diving team. The LTTE had fortified heavy weapons on both sides of the besieged Jaffna fort and the Gurunagar Jetty. In preparation for the mission, the Air Force continued bombing these areas using SIAI Marchetti SF.260's and fast attack craft (FAC) of the Navy kept hovering around Gurunagar Jetty to create a diversion.

The operation was carried out in 2 waves, 10 boats comprising 120 troops each, with the break of dawn under the cover of Heavy weaponry located from Mandativ island. Under heavy RPG, Five Zero and Mortar fire from the LTTE the Navy transported troops to within 50m of beach. Although the casualties were high, the Sri Lankan troops managed to break the siege at the Jaffna Fort and rescue the troops stranded inside. Despite the valor shown at the face of the enemy in a daring operation, the Navy officers and the sailors who took part were not recommended for a Gallantry medal by the Navy hierarchy citing said actions were a part of their job.

== Role during humanitarian operations ==
During 2005 to 2009, he held the appointments of Director Naval Land Operations, Commander Southern Naval Area (Appointed aftermath of the LTTE attack on Galle harbour), Director Naval Weapons, Director Naval RABS, Director Naval Operations and Deputy Area Commander Northern Naval Area. He was also a part of the team that signed the MOU for the refit of SLNS Sagara when it was transferred from the Indian Coast Guard.

He was the deputy area commander of Northern Naval Area during a decisive period of humanitarian operations (2007-2009), and as Director Naval Operations he gave enormous support to the Command while intense fighting was going on. He became the first director of Rapid Action Boat Squadron, with the beginning of the humanitarian operations to liberate the East and North. The then Commodore Amarasinghe was a pioneer member who introduced the small boats concept and raised the Sri Lanka Navy Rapid Action Boat Squadron (RABS) unit in October 2006 to conduct amphibious and small boats operations which was instrumental in eliminating the LTTE sea tigers (suicide) operations. He held this position in addition to his other appointments at the time till March 2009 developing RABS in to a deadly force. The Rapid Action Boat Squadron was one of the decisive factors that turned tables for the Sri Lanka Navy at Sea. At the time the war ended, he was serving as the Director Naval Operations & Director Naval Weapons at the Navy Headquarters. He was promoted to the rank of rear admiral in September 2009 with the end of War.

== Decorations and medals ==
He is a recipient of Rana Sura Padakkama (RSP) for gallantry at sea, Vishista Seva Vibhushanaya (VSV) for unblemished service, Uttama Seva Padakkama (USP) for meritorious and distinguished service. He is also awarded with service and campaign medals such as Sri Lanka Navy 50th Anniversary Medal & Clasp, Sri Lanka Armed Services Long Service Medal & Clasp, 50th Independence Anniversary Commemoration Medal, Eastern Humanitarian Operations Medal, Northern Humanitarian Operations Medal & Clasp, North and East Operations Medal and Clasp, Purna Bhumi Padakkama, Vadamarachchi Operation Medal and the Riviresa Campaign Services Medal & Clasp. He is a recipient of thirteen commendations letters from Commander of the Navy.

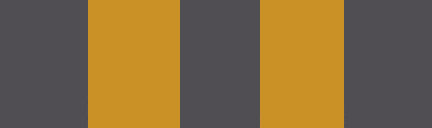

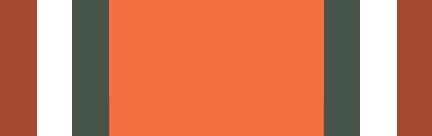

== Victimization within navy ==
While Admiral Amarasing was able to retire gracefully in 2014 from the Sri Lanka Navy, he was victimised by a high ranking naval official in 2009-2011 by wrongly accusing him of being a supporter of Sarath Fonseka & the UNP during 2010 Sri Lankan presidential elections. At the time he was Commander Western Naval Area and he was appointed as the Commander North Central Naval Area later. Although his innocence was proven later, this accusation deprived him the opportunity to attend prestigious National Defence College, New Delhi.

== Education and sports career ==
He is an Old Boy of St. Mary's College Negombo and De Mazenod College Kandana with outstanding performances in sports as well as academics. He represented his schools in soccer, athletics and basketball. He is a distinguished sportsman who represented Sri Lanka schools in soccer, as a member of the national team (1978-1979) and the Sri Lanka Navy team (1980-1985). He also represented Sri Lanka Navy in tennis (1984-2005). He was the Sri Lanka Navy tennis champion from 1986 to 1989. He is a recipient of Navy and Defense Services colors in Tennis. Under his direction the Sri Lanka Navy football team achieved success in the years 2010 and 2012, winning the FA Cup.

== Family ==
He is the son of late Quintin Amarasinghe, a retired civil servant of Ministry of Defence, and Dorathi Amarasinghe. He is married to Chandrika and they have two daughters, Kaushalya and Ruvithra.

== See also ==
- Sri Lanka Navy
- Rapid Action Boat Squadron
