= Rapid Action Boat Squadron =

Force element squadron of Sri Lanka Navy

The Rapid Action Boat Squadron (RABS) (Sinhala: ක්ෂණික ක්‍රියාකාරී යාත්‍රා බලඝණය, romanized: kṣaṇika kriyākāri yātrā balagaṇaya) is a force element squadron of the Sri Lanka Navy that provides expertise in small boat operations in support of littoral operations, amphibious and riverine activities. The unit is equipped with Inshore Patrol Crafts (IPC)s and Arrow speed boats that provide high degree of firepower along with high speed and maneuverability.

== History ==
The unit was formed in 2007 under a directive from the then commander of the Navy, Vice Admiral Wasantha Karannagoda with Commodore Rohan Amarasinghe as its first director to counter light fibreglass attack boats used by the Sea Tigers in the coastal waters of Sri Lanka during the Sri Lankan Civil War. The unit also carried out amphibious raids on sea tigers coastal outposts.

== Organisation ==
They operate with IPCs in groups of four craft with some groups totaling 25–30 craft combine to form IPC units, which are based at strategically important locations around the island. The IPC squadrons are organised for rapid-reaction interception operations, because the Sea Tiger cadres are able to remain hidden until they decide to confront the SLN. To maximise the amount of firepower each squadron can bring to a battle, an IPC unit would speed towards the enemy using strategies that echo infantry tactics: an arrowhead formation is used to expand each boat's arc of fire in an attack manoeuvre, or boats are arranged in three adjacent columns in single file so as to mask their numbers and increase the SLN's element of surprise.
