= Fast Attack Flotilla =

The 4th Fast Attack Flotilla (aka Dvora Squadron) is a force element flotilla of the Sri Lanka Navy. The flotilla's mission is to provide heavily armed and fast patrol boat (called fast attack craft or FACs) capability to counter sea tiger movements along the coast and to protect naval and civilian shipping from sea tiger suicide crafts.

== History ==
In 1985, the first Dvora-class fast patrol boats were introduced into the Sri Lanka Navy to counter LTTE gun running in the Palk Strait from India. The 4th Fast Attack Squadron was formed on 14 September 1988 and became known as the Dvora Squadron. With escalation of the Sri Lankan Civil War the Sea Tigers began to pose a threat to the patrol boats of the Navy, with use of small fibreglass boats armed with machine guns. The flotilla was used as the primary offensive unit to counter these boats. When the Sea Tigers started to use boats for suicide bomber attacks on ships the unit was used for defensive operations too, such as escorting larger naval ships and civilian ships in coastal waters off the northern and eastern provinces of the country. Able to reach speeds of 45 knots (83 km/h; 52 mph) these fast attack craft (FACs) operate in pairs to counter sea tiger wolf pack tactics and also to defend each other against small suicide craft that try ram them.

Between 1993 and 2009, twenty FAC have been sunk, becoming naval unit to suffer the highest number of casualties during the war. The flotilla was involved in an operation in 2010 that took out 11 LTTE boats and killed 70 LTTE guerrillas.

In 2019, the 4th Fast Attack Squadron was commissioned as the 4th Fast Attack Flotilla.

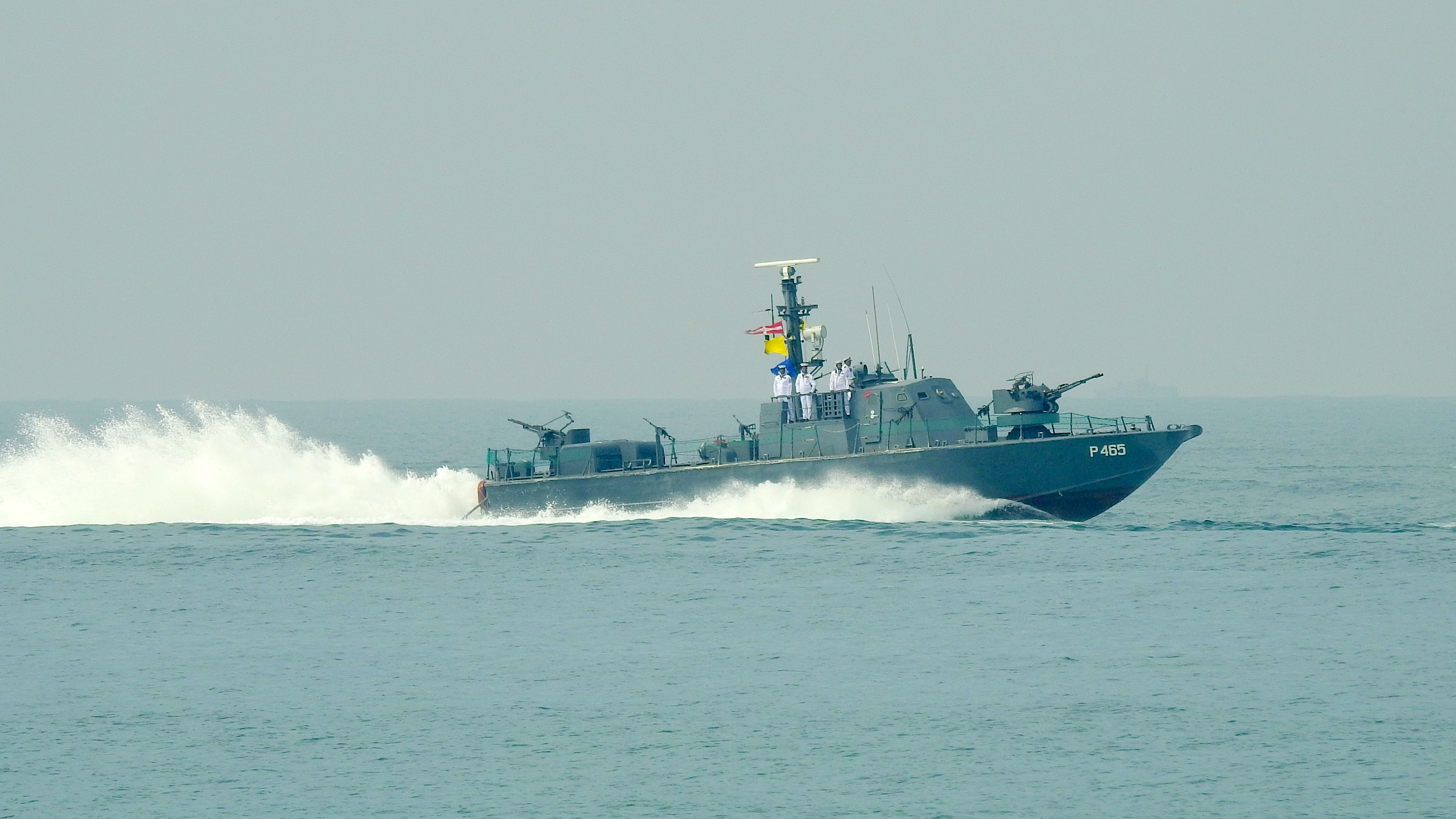
SLN fast attack craft

== Armament ==
Early Dvoras were armed with two to three machine guns as most patrol boats in other navies do. However, during the progress of the war the armament on board FACs were increased considerably due to the increase of arms carried on sea tiger boats that ranges from heavy anti-aircraft machine guns to rocket launchers. All FACs have Typhoon 25-30 mm stabilized cannon installed as their primary armament, which can be slaved to state-of the art mast-mounted, day and night all weather long range electro-optic systems. This enables FACs to locate and target sea tiger boats at a greater distance, in all weather at high speeds.

Newer FACs, specially Colombo-class series III FACs are equipped with Elop MSIS optronic director and Typhoon GFCS as its own weapons control system. Also these crafts use surface search Furuno FR 8250 or Corden Mk 2; I-band as its radar. In addition to their main armament they carry additional weapon systems such as DS30 30 mm twin gun, Oerlikon 30 mm twin cannon, Oerlikon 20 mm cannons, automatic grenade launchers, Type 80 machine guns, W85 heavy machine gun and Type 63 multiple rocket launchers, including 12.7 mm and 7.62 mm machine guns. These act as both offensive and point defense weapons to protect the FAC from suicide craft, by destroying them before they could ram or explode close to the FAC. Therefore, compared with similar patrol boats of other navies, Sri Lanka Navy FACs are more heavily armed and faster.

== Organization ==
The flotilla is based at SLN Dockyard, Trincomalee, however boats operate out of all major harbors. Individual units come under the direct command of the flag officer commanding that particular naval area it is assigned to.

== FAC Squadron Pin ==
The FAC Squadron Pin is award to:

- Temporary award:
  - Commanding Officer (FAF 4), Squadron Commanders and Training Commander.
  - All officers/sailors who are attached to FACs.
  - All officers/sailors who are attached to FAF4 training team.
  - Any officer/sailor who is attached to FAF 4 Staff and recommended by Commanding Officer (FAF 4)
- Permanent award:
  - Naval personnel who have served over one year on board operational FACs.
  - Officer or salor, who have been wounded in action while serving on FAC and unable to serve in FAC due to wounds sustained.

== Boat classes ==
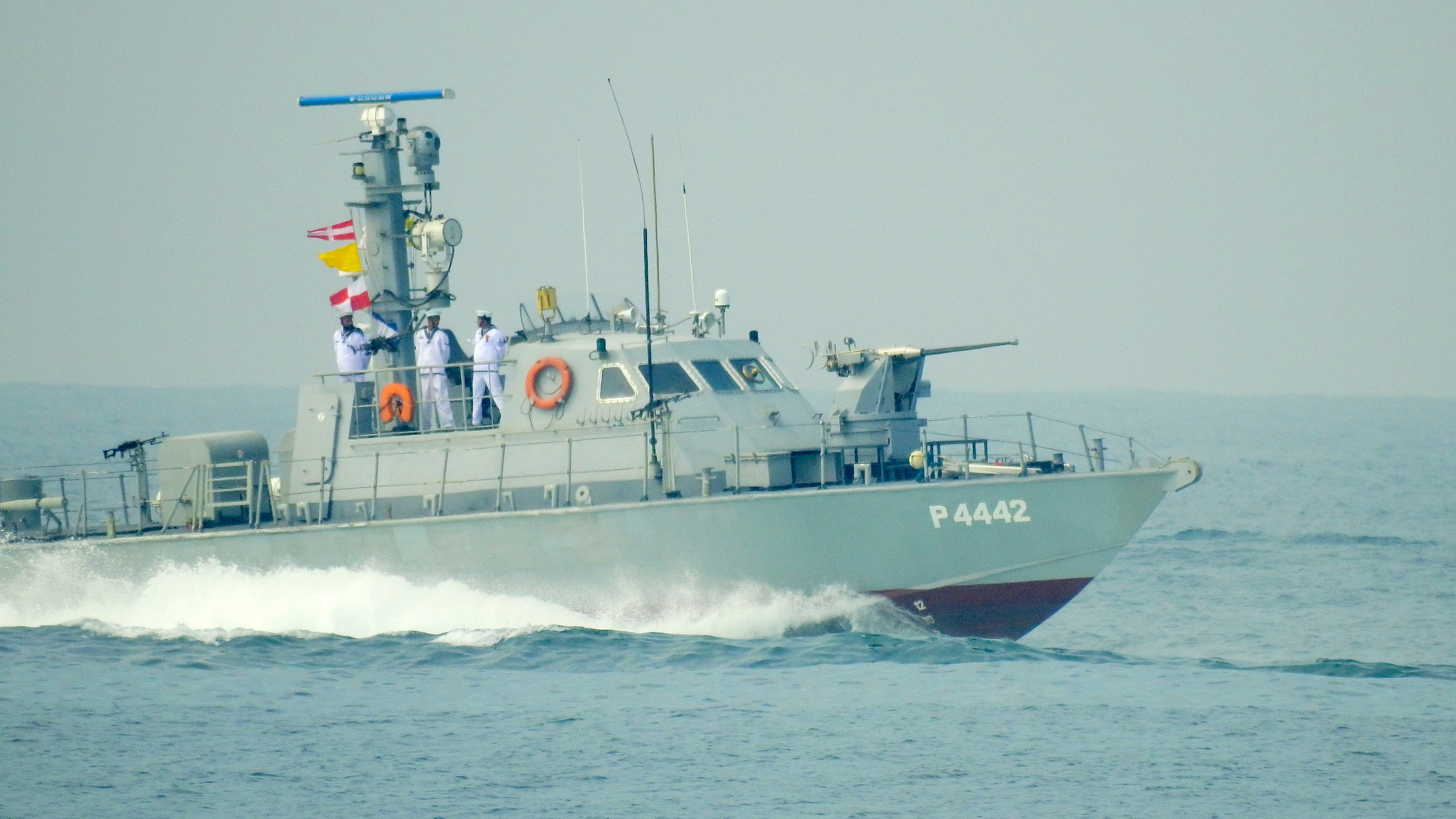
Super Dvora Mk III-class FAC of 4th Fast Attack Flotilla

- Super Dvora Mk III
- Super Dvora - Mk II
- Shaldag class
- Colombo class (Locally built)
- Dvora - Mk I
- Simonneau class
- Chevron class
- Trinity Marine class
- Killer class

== Recipient of the Parama Weera Vibhushanaya ==
- Lieutenant-Commander Jude Wijethunge †

== Notable members ==
- Rear Admiral SR Samaratunga, RSP, VSV, USP, psc, MNI, SLN -
- Admiral Thisara Samarasinghe, RSP, VSV, USP, ndc, psc, DISS, MNI, SLN - former Commander of the Sri Lankan Navy
- Vice Admiral Piyal De Silva - Commander of the Sri Lankan Navy
- Rear Admiral Y. N. Jayarathna - Commandant of the Naval and Maritime Academy
- Lieutenant Commander Yoshitha Rajapaksa - Chief of Staff to the Prime Minister of Sri Lanka
