= Battle off the coast of Jaffna =

Naval battle between Sri Lanka and Tamil Tigers

Coordinates: 9°40′N 80°00′E

The Battle off the coast of Jaffna was a naval battle fought between the Navy of Sri Lanka and Tamil Tiger ships. According to Sri Lankan sources, it took place on Saturday 1 November 2008 in the northern territorial waters of Sri Lanka off the coast of Jaffna during the Sri Lankan Civil War. A Sri Lankan government customs officer, D.K.P. Dassangayake, reported that the battle begun as the Navy met the rebel ships and exchanged fire.
