= Jude Wijethunge =

Sri Lankan Navy officer (died 1996)

Lieutenant Commander Jude Lakmal De Silva Wijethunge † PWV
- ජූඩ් ලක්මාල් ද සිල්වා විජේතුංග
- Born: Jude Lakmal De Silva Wijethunge; 3 February 1967; Elpitiya, Galle
- Died: 30 March 1996 (aged 29); Chalai Lagoon, Mullaithivu
- Military career
- Allegiance: Sri Lanka
- Branch: Sri Lanka Navy
- Service years: Unknown – 1996
- Rank: Lieutenant Commander
- Service number: NRX 0517
- Unit: 4th Fast Attack Flotilla
- Commands: Dvora-class fast patrol boat P458 of the 4th Fast Attack Flotilla
- Awards: Parama Weera Vibhushanaya

Lieutenant Commander Jude Lakmal De Silva Wijethunge (Sinhala: ජූඩ් ලක්මාල් ද සිල්වා විජේතුංග, died 30 March 1996) was an officer in the Sri Lanka Navy. He was a proud product of Ananda Central College Elpitiya. As a Lieutenant, he commanded the Dvora-class fast patrol boat P458 of the 4th Fast Attack Flotilla. He was posthumously awarded the Parama Weera Vibhushanaya, Sri Lanka's highest military award for gallantry, for his actions on 30 March 1996 in defending a Navy transport from a Sea Tiger attack. As part of an escort to the transport vessel MV Ngarome, Wijethunge fought off repeated attacks until his craft had suffered severe damage including to its engines, and all his crew were incapacitated. Noticing a Sea Tiger suicide boat, Wijethunge maneuvered the P458 to intercept it causing the suicide boat to ram into his vessel. The resulting explosion destroyed both vessels, thereby saving the transport vessel which was the target of the suicide boat. Two members of his crew were later rescued from the waters. He was posthumously promoted to the rank of Lieutenant Commander in addition to receiving the Parama Weera Vibhushanaya, and is Sri Lanka's first naval officer to receive the award.

Wijethunge is one of only two navy recipients of the Parama Weera Vibhushanaya, the other being Chief Petty Officer K. G. Shantha.
