= Naval Boat Building Yard (Sri Lanka) =

Coordinates: 7.0179°N 79.9029°E

- Ragama in Sri Lanka
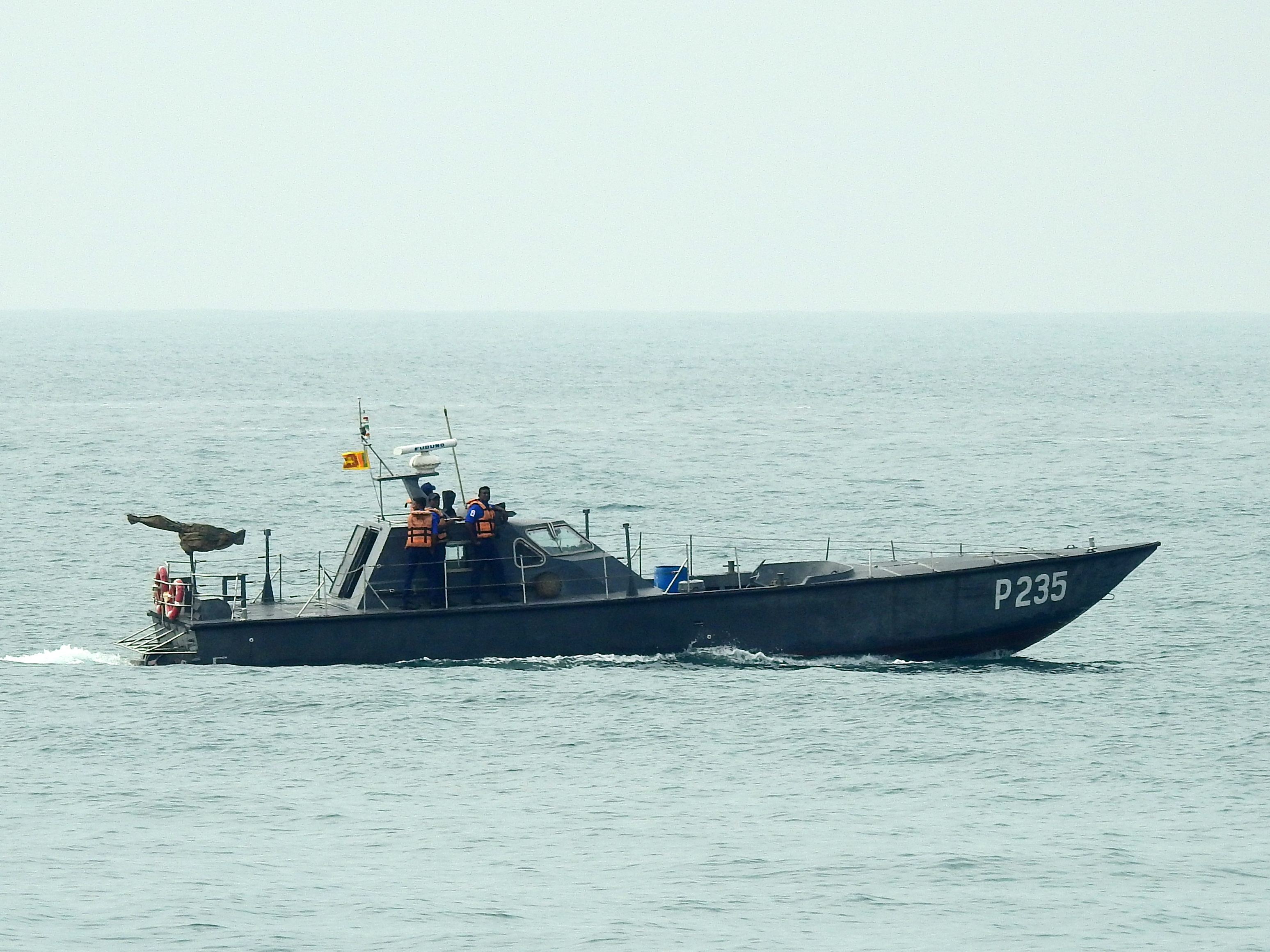
- Wave Rider Class patrol boat produced by Naval Boat Building Yard

Site information
- Type: Shipyard
- Controlled by: Sri Lanka Navy
- Website: https://www.navy.lk/naval-boat-building-yard.html

Site history
- Built: 2000
- In use: 2000- Present

Naval Boat Building Yard (NBBY) is a shipyard of the Sri Lanka Navy situated in Welisara that produce small and specialist watercraft for the Sri Lanka Armed Forces, state institutions and civilians.

== History ==
The Boatyard was originally founded in 2000 as the Inshore Patrol Craft Construction Project (IPCCP) for the fabrication of small attack boats including swarm boats to combat the terrorist activities in North and East during the Sri Lankan Civil War. Sea Tigers during its battles against the Sri Lankan Navy used swarming tactics with explosive suicide boats mixed in swarms of speed boats which was effective against larger vessels which were rammed by suicide boats while occupied by swarms. However with the Naval Boat Building Yard introducing the Arrow-class the asymmetric tactics of the Sea Tigers were no longer effective. In 2006, Navy confronted LTTE 21 times and in 2007 12 times and by 2008 (up-to-date) only 04 times as the Sea Tigers lost cadres and fighting platforms.

With the end of the war the NBBY has further expanded and have also exported boats to foreign militaries such as Nigeria and Seychelles. Further they have also begun production of civilian-use crafts for government projects and private use.

== Products ==
This list includes notable watercraft built by the boat building yard.

- Wave Rider-class patrol boat
- Cedric-class patrol boat
- Landing Craft Utility (L 801)
- Fast Landing Craft Utility (L 802)
- Passenger Ferry
- Fire Rescue boat Sri Lanka Coast Guard (CG 80)
- Kayaks
- Admiral Barge luxury passenger craft
- Fiberglass dinghy
- Lagoon craft passenger boat
- Dolphin craft -whale/dolphin watching boat
- Enterprise Class sailing boat
- Catamaran-type floating cafeteria
- Passenger crafts
- Research Crafts
- Fireboats
- Ambulance craft
- Rigid Hull Inflatable Boat
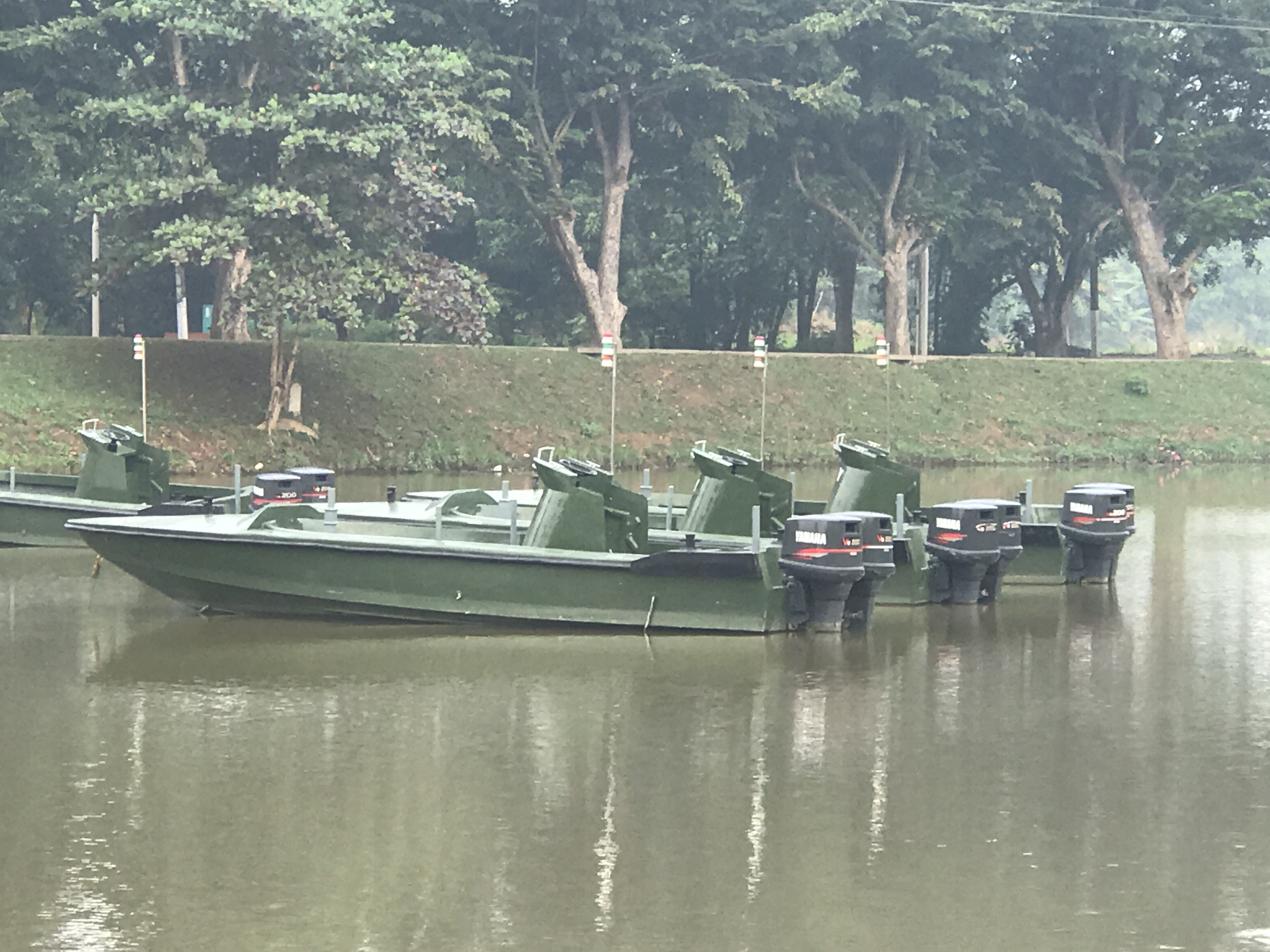
Cedric-Class Patrol Boats

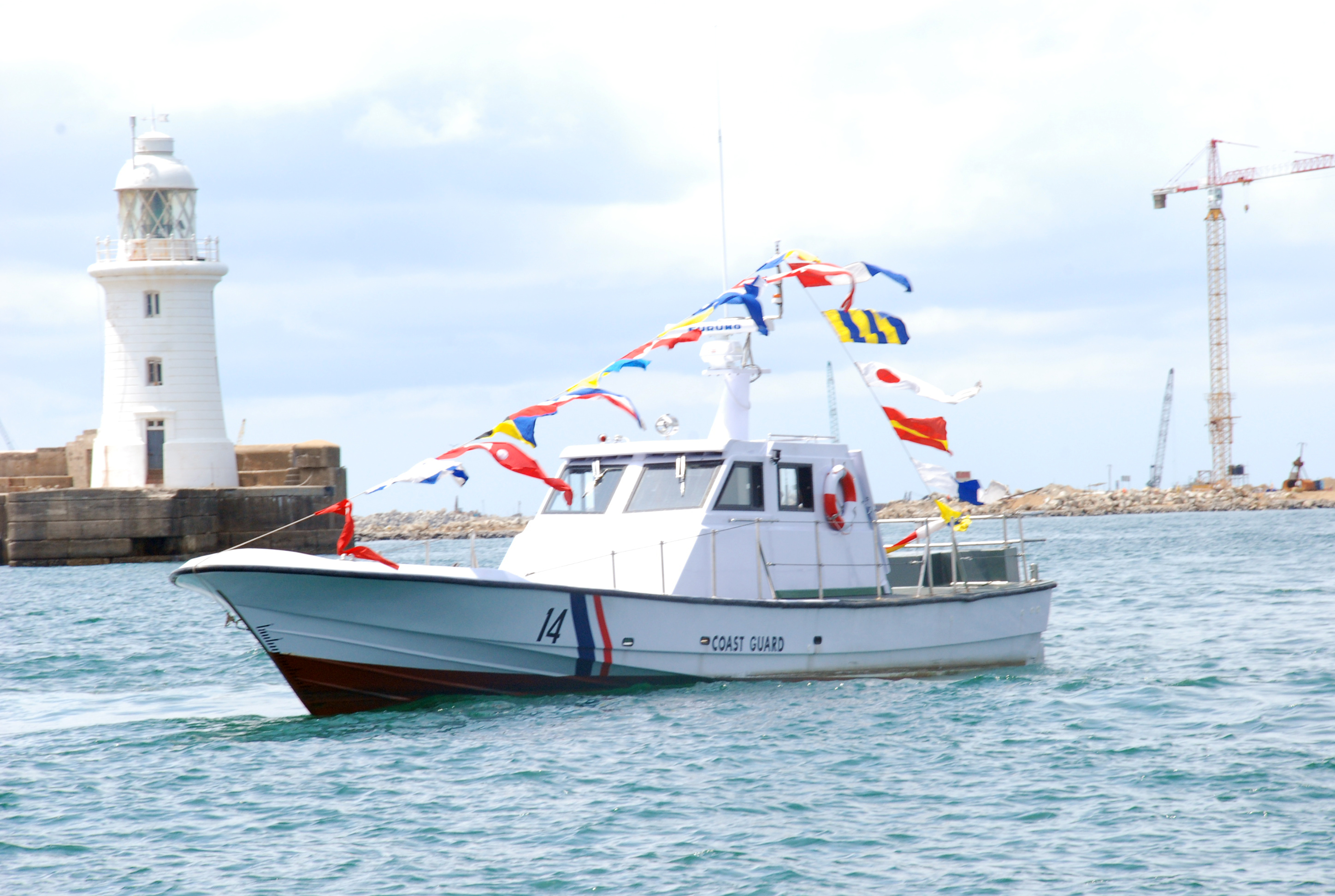
Sri Lanka Coast Guard Accommodation Type Wave Rider

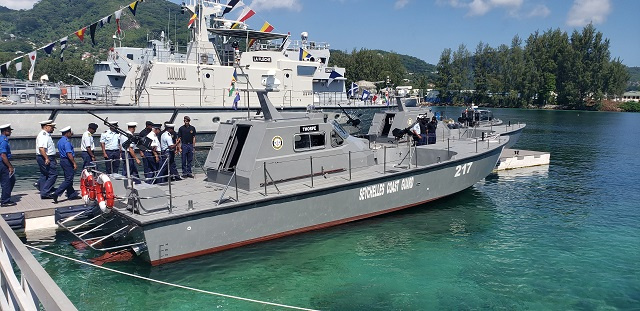
Wave Rider Class patrol boat which donated to Seychelles Coast Guard
