= Operation Thrividha Balaya =

1990 Sri Lankan military operation

- Part of Sri Lankan Civil War
| Date | 13 September 1990 |
| Location | Jaffna, Sri Lanka |
| Result | Sri Lankan victory: the Sri Lankan Army breaks the siege at Jaffna fort |

Belligerents
| Sri Lanka | Liberation Tigers of Tamil Eelam |

Commanders and leaders
| Maj. Gen Denzil Kobbekaduwa; Lt. Col. Gotabaya Rajapaksa; Lt. Col. Sarath Fonseka; Captain A. F. Lafir; Captain A.H.M. Razeek; Lieutenant Rohan Amarasinghe; Sub Lieutenant Noyel Kalubowila; Wg. Cdr. Sunil Cabraal | Vellupillai Prabhakaran |

Units involved
| Sri Lanka Armed Forces; Sri Lanka Army; Gajaba Regiment; 1st Battalion; Sinha Regiment; 1st Battalion; Special Forces Regiment; Sri Lanka Navy; Sri Lanka Air Force | Liberation Tigers of Tamil Eelam |

Operation Thrividha Balaya was a combined military operation, the first of its kind, launched by the Sri Lankan Military in Jaffna. The operation was carried out to break the siege of the Sri Lanka Army garrison of the old Dutch Jaffna Fort in Jaffna.

== Background ==
After the Liberation Tigers of Tamil Eelam broke off the peace negotiations with the government with the 1990 massacre of Sri Lankan Police officers, they took over police stations and launched an offensive against unprepared military units in the North-East, taking over large swathes of territory from undermanned army units consisting of volunteers while professional troops were sent to the south to quell the JVP uprising. The LTTE captured Jaffna but the garrison of the Jaffna fort of 172 men mostly from the police managed to hold out despite lacking the numbers necessary to man such a large fortification against numerically superior enemies. The defenders also managed to evacuate cash and valuables stored in the Jaffna banks to the fort. Harbin Y-12, guarded by two SF-260TPs, provided intermittent air drops. The SF-260TPs also strafed the perimeter of the fort at night despite being severely under-armed.

President Ranasinghe Premadasa approved the launch of Thrivida Balaya, the first combined arms offensive launched by the government since the Eelam War 2 started to lift the siege and retake the Jaffna town. Plans were laid out by Maj. Gen Denzil Kobbekaduwa to rescue the troops 6 SLSR & Police led by Lt.Jayantha Fernando of the besieged Jaffna Fort and to liberate the town of Jaffna with the combined strength of the Army, Navy & the Air Force. Troops of 1GR led by Lt. Col Gotabaya Rajapaksa and 1 SLSR led by Lt.Col Sarath Fonseka were tasked with breaking the siege at Jaffna Fort and regaining the town of Jaffna under government control. Captain A.H.M Razeek, Commander Northern Naval area planned the landings of the troops. Northern Zonal Sri Lankan Army Forces Commander, Wg. Cdr. Sunil Cabral was in charge of the air operations.

== Operation ==
The operation started with Sri Lankan Army securing Kayts Island in late August, 1990 with a combined amphibious and airbone force. The First Battalion of the Gajaba Regiment (1 GR) and the First Battalion of the Sri Lanka Sinha Regiment (1 SLSR) commanded by the Lieutenant Colonels Gotabhaya Rajapaksa and Sarath Fonseka, respectively, cleared the Kayts Island and them jumped to the Mandaitivu Island, killing over 80 members of the LTTE. State Minister for Defence Ranjan Wijeratne flew to the frontlines to congratulate those involved in the operation. Mandaitivu was to be used as the launching pad for the first phase of the offensive.

While a causeway linked Mandaitivu with the Jaffna peninsula as the causeway could be heavily mined, fiberglass dinghies were to be used despite the Navy at that time lacking any experience in major amphibious assaults using small boats under high intensity fire. The operation to transport troops across the lagoon commenced in the early hours of 13 September with use of Sri Lanka Navy fibreglass dinghies under heavy fire by the LTTE. The contingent of Navy dinghies was led by Lieutenant Rohan Amarasinghe. The first wave of troops consisted of the Alpha Company of 1 GR led by Captain Udaya Perera and Delta company of 1 SLSR led by Captain Boniface Perera. Sri Lanka Navy, under heavy fire transported more than 200 troops across the lagoon. The troops successfully managed to break the siege at the Jaffna Fort. The 1 GR was to then capture the Pannai police quarters while the 1 SLSR was to capture the telecommunications building but neither could achieve their objectives and a SF-260TP was lost after the pilot lost control after being hit by 50 caliber fire. Gotabhaya Rajapaksa later commented that the Sri Lankan Army would have succeeded in its efforts if troops had crossed the lagoon immediately after securing Mandaitivu Island but delaying the crossing by over two weeks resulted in the failure to exploit an opportunity created by the disarray in LTTE forces due to the fall of Mandaitivu.

Food and supplies were brought to the Fort for the operation by the troops of the 1 Special Forces led by Captain Fazly Laphir in a mission dubbed "Suicide Express". The Navy managed to evacuate the troops from Jaffna under heavy fire. During the last day of the evacuations the boats loaded with cash and jewelry were nearly left behind and Sub Lieutenant, Noyel Kalubowila and two policemen had to turn back and retrieve the boats which they successfully carried out.

== Aftermath ==
The operation was called off by the Army headquarters after about 2 weeks of its commencement.

Lt. Jayantha Fernando was personally recommended for Weerodara Vibhushanaya by Lt. Gen Denzil Kobekaduwa, but was only awarded Rana Wickrama Padakkama which he did not accept as it was not awarded to the other 2 soldiers who had volunteered with him to support the troops inside the fort.

Lt. Rohan Amarasinghe, who led the Navy contingent, was denied a gallantry medal by the Command Operations Officer.

Many other Army officers such as Kamal Gunaratne, Mahesh Senanayake, Shavendra Silva who made large contributions during the final phase of the Sri Lankan civil war also took part in the operation in different capacities.
