= Small boat operations =

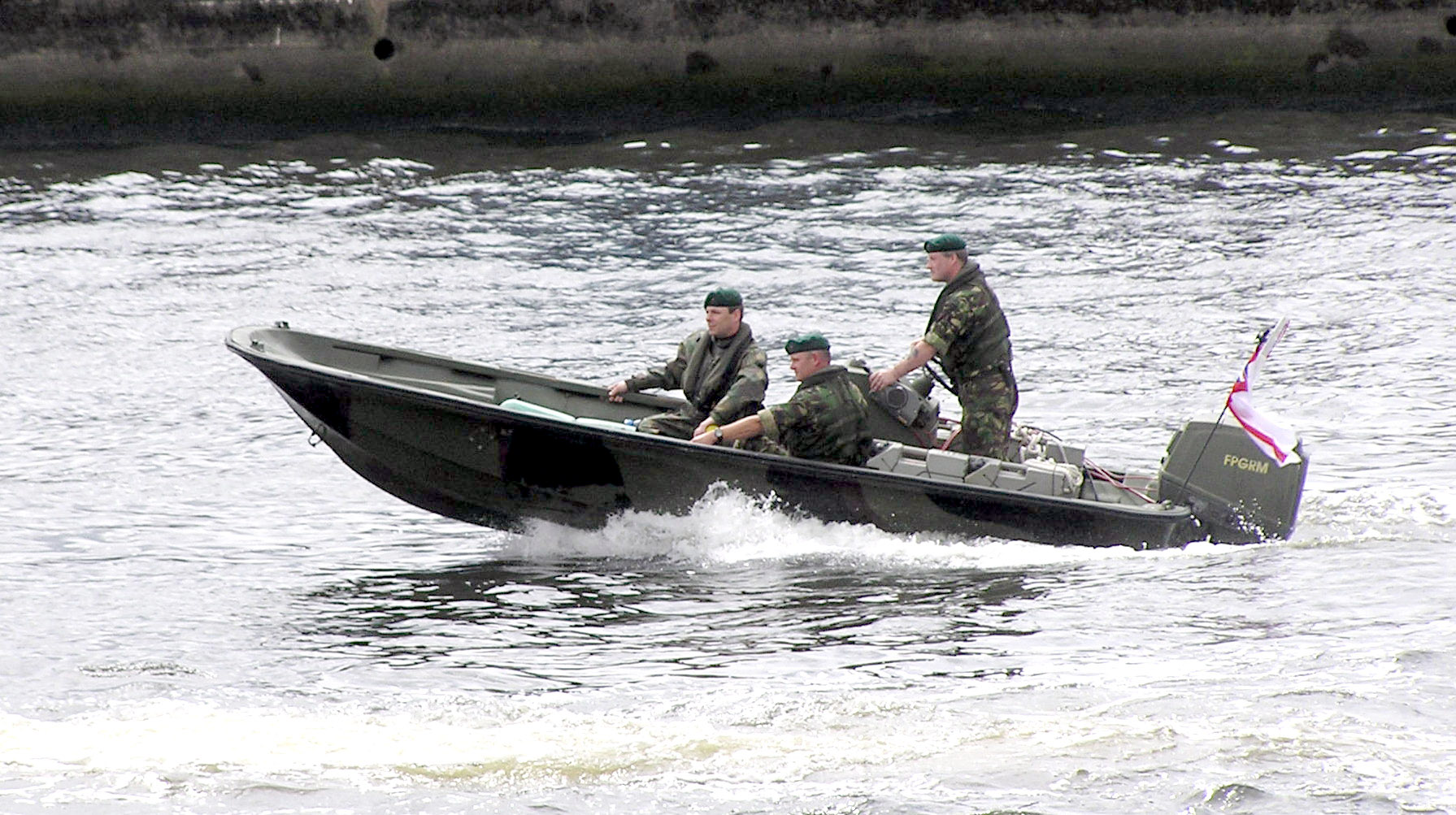
Royal Marines in a Rigid Raider assault watercraft.

Small boat operations in military and naval warfare refers to operations in and around the littoral zone, within a certain distance of shore, carried out by small, fast and highly maneuverable craft. In recent years, research has been conducted into the use of autonomous small boats for use in military contexts.

== History ==
The role of these types of operations has been both offensive and defensive. Conventional navies have used small torpedo craft for hit-and-run type attacks and raids on coastal and shoreline targets as far back as the late 1800s. Prior to the use of modern small boat operations and torpedoes in warfare, large naval vessels were generally used to contain enemy ports without a large risk of sustaining damage from the vessels in port, though the advancement of small boats has changed this calculus. By the 20th century, the use of small boats in coastal operations had become a standard part of naval defense strategies.

Following suicide attacks on warships by terrorists such as in the Sri Lankan Civil War and the USS Cole bombing, navies have adapted specialized craft to maintain port security, patrol coastal and river line areas.

== Craft types ==
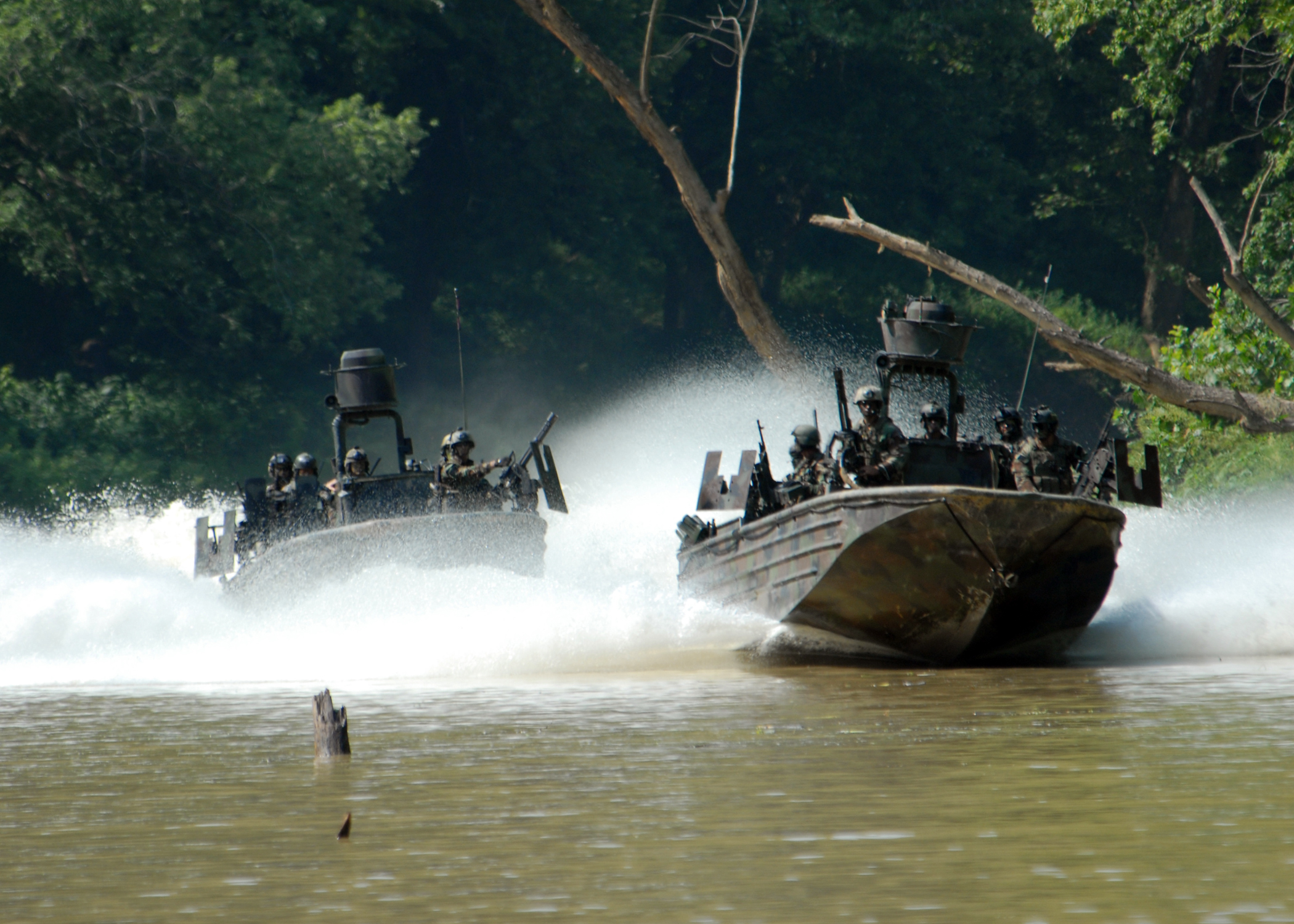
Special Boat Team 22 in SOC-R boats

- Rigid Raider
- Arrow boat
- SOC-R boat

== Units ==
- 1 Assault Group Royal Marines
- Rapid Action Boat Squadron
- Special Warfare Combatant-craft Crewmen

== See also ==
- Amphibious warfare
