= Cedric-class patrol boat =

Class of speed boats for the Sri Lanka Navy

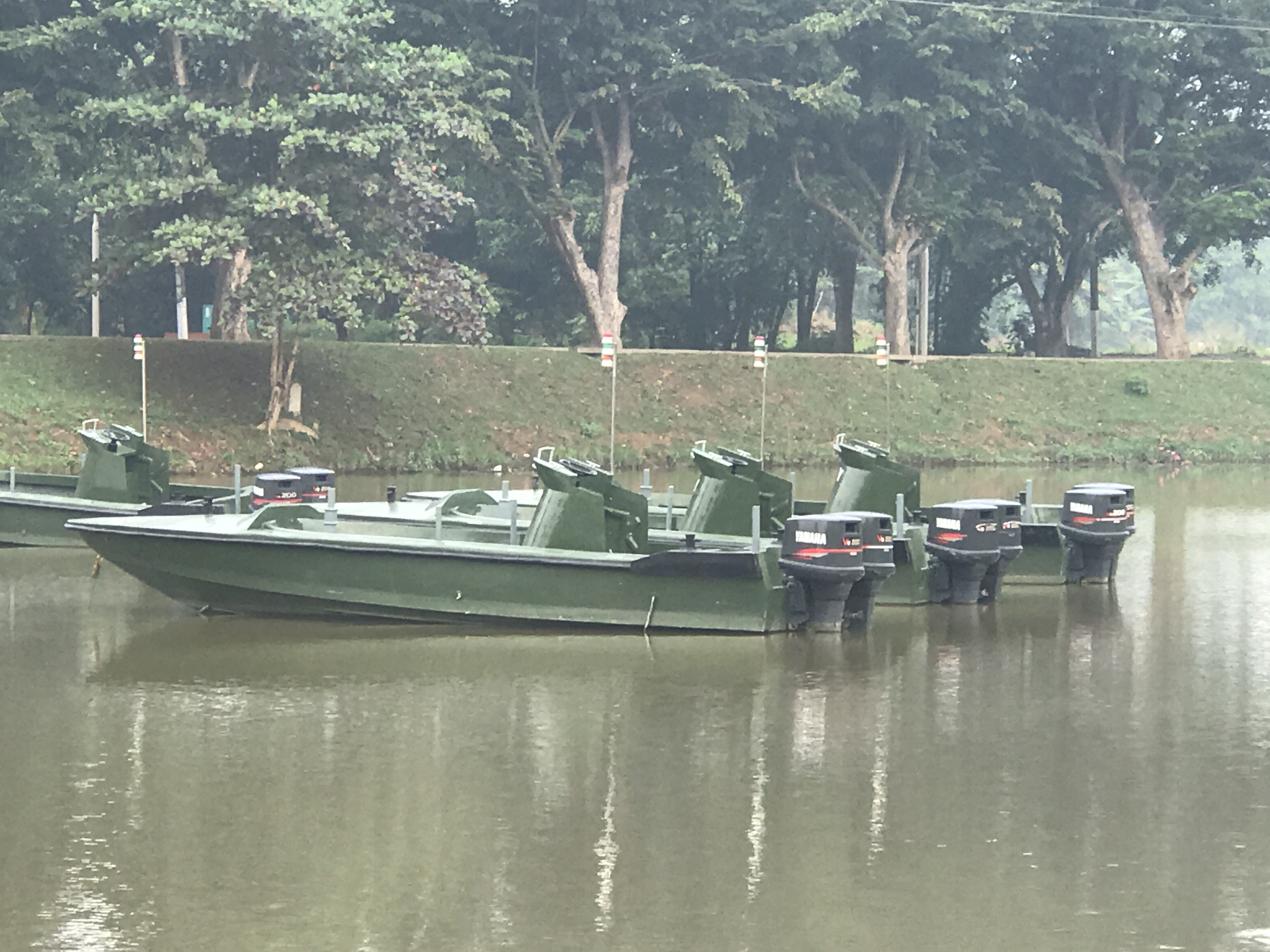

Class overview
- Name: Arrow /Cedric
- Builders: Naval Boat Building Yard
- Operators: See Operators
- Cost: Rs. 1.7 million (US$ 17,000)
- Built: 2005-2006
- In service: 2006 onwards
- In commission: 2006
- Completed: 150+
- Active: 150+
- Lost: 1 (according to SL Military)

General characteristics
- Type: Patrol boat
- Length: 23.6 ft (7.2 m)
- Beam: 2.3 m
- Propulsion: 2 x 200 bhp (150 kW) outboard motor
- Speed: 30-35 knots
- Crew: 3-5
- Armament: 23 mm autocannon; PKM 7.62 mm machine guns; 12.7 mm ZPU-1

The Cedric class, formerly known as Arrow class, is a series of fast patrol/assault speed boats constructed by the Sri Lanka Navy for use by its littoral warfare units, the elite Special Boat Squadron (SBS) and the Rapid Action Boat Squadron (RABS).

The boat is capable of achieving high speeds and is highly maneuverable, meeting the requirements of these units in small boat operations. Armed with a high caliber gun or automatic grenade launcher as its primary weapon system and with multiple machine guns, the Arrow boats provides relatively high firepower despite its small size. It is also used by the navy for inshore monitoring operations.

== History ==
The Arrow boat has been in service with the Sri Lanka Navy’s Special Boat Squadron since its development as part of the Inshore Patrol Craft Project. From mid 2008, it has also been issued to the newly created Rapid Action Boat Squadron. The Arrow boat was widely used by the Sri Lanka Navy against the LTTE’s Sea Tigers during the last phase of the Sri Lankan Civil War, known as the Eelam War IV.

The 100th Arrow boat was launched by the Sri Lanka Navy on 11 September 2008. A ceremony was held at the navy base SLNS Gemunu at Welisara to mark this event, presided over by the Secretary of the Ministry of Defence, Gotabhaya Rajapaksa.

== Development ==
Designed under Commander Cedric Martenstyn according to the requirements of its elite unit, the Special Boats Squadron for a fast and maneuverable boat with high firepower, the navy developed the first prototype of the Arrow in 1994 and the boats were first used in combat in 2006. The navy produces the Arrow at a unit cost of Rs. 1.7 million (US$17,000).

In 2006, the navy located a Sea Tigers boat manufacturing yard in Trincomale, during a SBS operation, led by LCDR Mudiyanselage Bandula Dissanayake and was used to base SLN’s first 16-foot Arrow Boat and went in to service that year. With the guidance and encouragement of then-SLN Commander VADM Wasantha Karannagoda, Navy engineers continued to experiment with different configurations of this base model. The SBS also developed a specific tactical formation for using these Arrow Boats, the Rapid Action Boat Squadron.

=== Design ===
The Arrow boat is powered by a single 200 bhp (150 kW) outboard motor. Another variant of the boat, fitted with two outboard motors has also been developed. The hull is made of strengthened fiberglass. The boat is 23.6 feet (7.2 m) long. No armour is provided, with the intention of keeping the boat light enough to meet the primary requirements of speed and maneuverability.

The experiments yielded two more versions of the Arrow Boat, the 18-footer and the highly successful 23-foot model, which went into mass production. The 23-footer was crewed by four people: a coxswain, main gunner, stern gunner, and side gunner.

=== Armament ===
23 foot, the mass produced one, could be fitted with a 12.7 mm, 23 mm, or 30 mm main gun (some even were equipped with twin cannon versions); a 12.7 mm or automatic grenade launcher stern gun; and two 7.62 mm Chinese multi-purpose machine guns at the sides. Powered by two 250-horsepower engines, the boat boasted speeds of up to 35 knots.

== Operators ==
- Nigeria
  - Nigerian Navy - 9 boats
- Seychelles
  - Seychelles Coast Guard
- Sri Lanka
  - Sri Lanka Navy - 100+ boats
