= Sri Lanka Navy =

Naval component of the Sri Lanka Armed Forces

- ශ්‍රී ලංකා නාවික හමුදාව (Sinhala) இலங்கை கடற்படை (Tamil)
- Emblem of Sri Lanka Navy
- Founded: 1938
- Country: Sri Lanka
- Type: Navy
- Role: Naval warfare
- Size: 40,000 personnel
- Part of: Sri Lanka Armed Forces
- Headquarters: SLNS Parakrama, Colombo
- Mottos: Sinhala: රට වට බැඳි රන් ‍වැට; Rata Wata Baņdi Ran Wéta; English: "The golden fence around the country"
- Colours: Navy blue and white
- Anniversaries: Navy Day: 9 December
- Equipment: 5 Patrol Frigates; 4 Offshore Patrol Vessels; 2 Missile boats; 9 Fast Gun Boats; 45 Fast attack crafts; 200+ Fast Inshore Patrol Boats; 5 Amphibious warfare ships; 3 Auxiliary vessels
- Engagements: World War II; 1971 JVP Insurrection; Insurrection 1987–89; Sri Lankan Civil War; Operation Prosperity Guardian
- Decorations: Military awards and decorations of Sri Lanka
- Website: www.navy.lk

Commanders
- Commander-in-Chief: President Anura Kumara Dissanayake
- Commander of the Navy: Vice Admiral Damian Fernando
- Chief of staff: Vacant
- Deputy Chief of Staff: Rear Admiral Chinthaka Kumarasinghe
- Notable commanders: Admiral of the Fleet Wasantha Karannagoda; Admiral Daya Sandagiri; Admiral Clancy Fernando †; Admiral Thisara Samarasinghe; Admiral Ravindra Wijegunaratne

Insignia
- Naval ensign

- Naval jack

The Sri Lanka Navy (SLN) (Sinhala: ශ්‍රී ලංකා නාවික හමුදාව, romanised: Śrī Laṃkā nāvika hamudāva; Tamil: இலங்கை கடற்படை, romanised: Ilaṅkai kaṭaṟpaṭai) is the naval arm of the Sri Lanka Armed Forces and is classed as the country's most vital defence force due to its island geography. It is responsible for defending the maritime borders and interests of the Sri Lankan nation. The role of the Sri Lanka Navy is to conduct operations at sea for the defence of the nation and its interests and conduct prompt and sustainable combat operations at sea in accordance with the national policies.

Sri Lanka, situated in the middle of major sea lanes passing through the Indian Ocean, was always a magnet for seafarers and has a long history of naval campaigns. The current Sri Lankan Navy was established on 9 December 1950 when the Navy Act was passed for the formation of the Royal Ceylon Navy. The roots of the modern Sri Lankan Navy date back to 1938 when the Ceylon Naval Volunteer Force was established, which was renamed and absorbed into the Royal Navy as the Ceylon Royal Naval Volunteer Reserve during World War II. The current name, Sri Lanka Navy, was constituted in 1972 when Sri Lanka became a republic and with the introduction of new constitution.

It played a key role in the Sri Lankan Civil War, conducting surveillance and patrol, amphibious and supply operations. During the war, the navy moved from a small force focused on coastal patrols to a large combat force concentrating on asymmetric naval warfare capable of amphibious and land operations in support of counter-insurgency operations that progressed into engagements of a new form of littoral zone warfare. It carried out expeditionary deployments in the Indian Ocean in order to intercept rogue arm shipments on the high seas. The navy has its own elite special forces unit, the Special Boat Squadron.

The professional head of the navy is the Commander of the Navy, currently Vice Admiral Damian Fernando. The commander-in-chief of the Sri Lanka Armed Forces is the President of Sri Lanka, who heads the National Security Council; the Ministry of Defence is the organisation where ship buying policies are made for the navy. The Sri Lanka Navy has five Advanced Offshore Patrol Vessels (equivalent to a traditional patrol frigate), three Offshore Patrol Vessels, two missile boats, 40 fast attack crafts, more than 200 patrol boats, seven landing ships/craft, along with six auxiliary vessels.

== History ==
=== The beginning and World War II ===
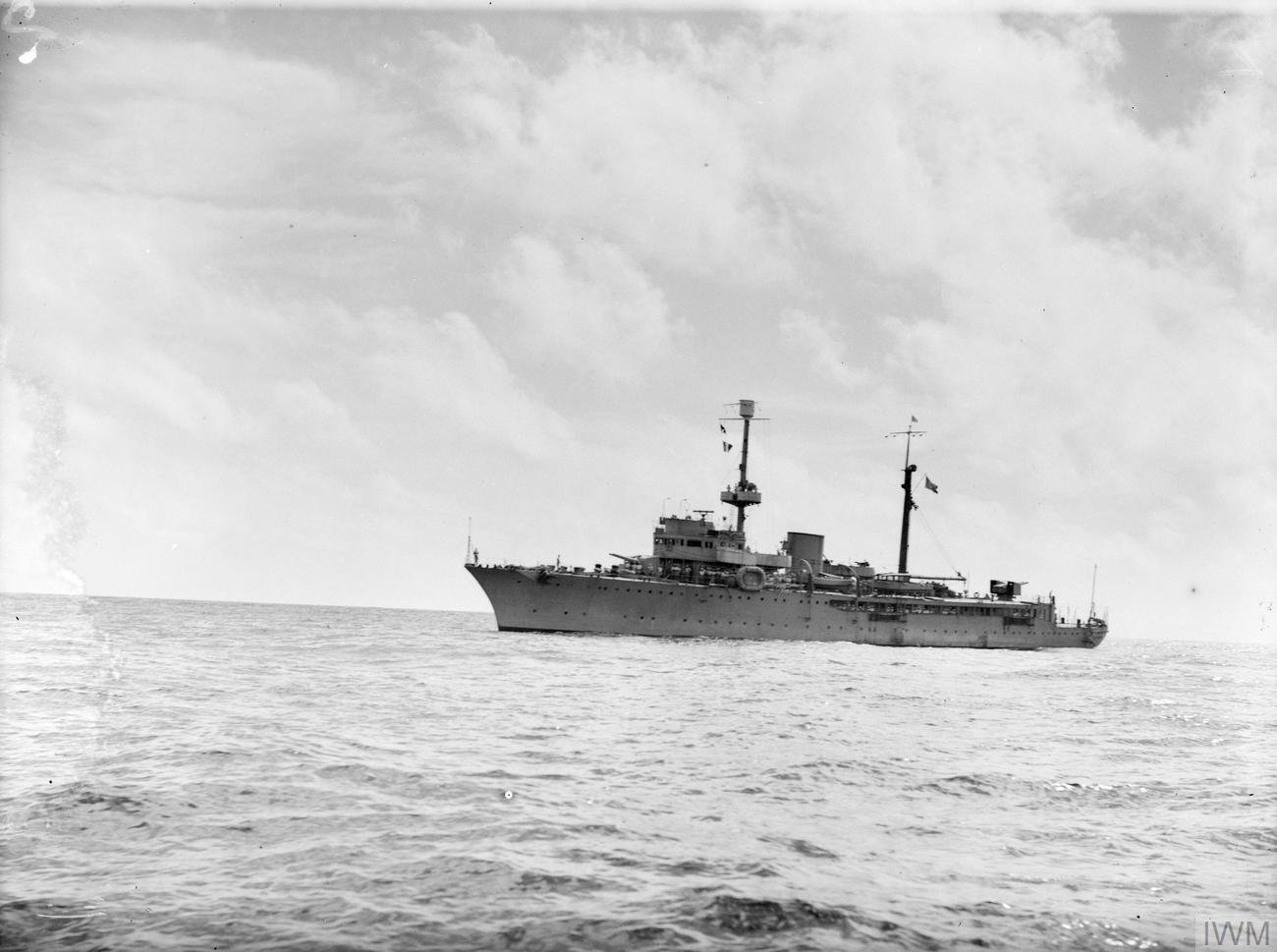
Eritrea, 14 September 1943 entering Port of Colombo to surrender following interception by HMS Overdale Wyke of the Ceylon Naval Volunteer Force.

In January 1938 the Ceylon Naval Volunteer Force (CNVF) was created with Commander W.G. Beauchamp as Commanding Officer under ordinance No I of 1937. On 31 August 1939 at the outset of World War II, the CNVF was mobilised for war duties. It took part in action during the Easter Sunday Raid. Three years later, the CNVF was offered to, and accepted by the Royal Navy (RN) as a Volunteer Reserve, the Ceylon Royal Naval Volunteer Reserve (CRNVR). It continued under Royal Navy operational and administrative command until March 1946. With the end of the war, it reverted to Ceylon Government control, though yet CRNVR in name. In the 1939–1946 period, the CRNVR carried out several operational duties, mainly at sea. Cutting its teeth on the Port Commission tugs Samson and Goliath, it later crewed and operated trawlers and Antarctic whalers converted as minesweepers and fitted out with guns, submarine detection equipment and anti-submarine weaponry. They were HMS Overdale Wyke (the first ship to be purchased by the Government of Ceylon), HMS Okapi, HMS Semla, HMS Sambhur, HMS Hoxa, HMS Balta and HM Tugs Barnet and C 405. In addition the CRNVR crewed nned several Motor Fishing Vessels (MFV), Harbour Defence Motor Launch (HDML) and miscellaneous auxiliary vessels. All were crewed exclusively by CRNVR personnel. These ships were meant to sweep and guard the approaches the harbours but were often used on extended missions outside Ceylon waters. In the course of these operations, the ships came under enemy fire, recovered essential information from Imperial Japanese aircraft that were shot down, sailed to Akyab (modern Sittwe) after the Burma front was opened in two FMVs for harbour duties, and were called upon to accept the surrender of the Italian sloop Eritrea and escort her to the Colombo port with a prize crew on board.

=== Royal Ceylon Navy ===
Naval Ensign of the Royal Ceylon Navy (1950–1972).

==== Formation ====
With Ceylon gaining self-rule from the British in 1948, the Parliament of Ceylon passed the Navy Act, No. 34 of 1950 which established the Royal Ceylon Navy (RCyN) on 9 December 1950. The CRNVR served as a source of officers and sailors for the newly established RCyN as one hundred were selected and transferred to the regular naval force. Under the Navy Act, the CRNVR became the volunteer naval force on 9 January 1951 as the Royal Ceylon Volunteer Naval Force (RCVNF). The first warship of the RCyN was commissioned in 1951 as HMCyS Vijaya, an Algerine-class minesweeper, ex-HMS Flying Fish along with other patrol boats and tugs. It was the policy of His Majesties Government of Ceylon to build a strong navy to be the first line of defence of the island country. As such the fleet was expanded with the addition of, HMCyS Parakrama, another Algerine-class minesweeper (ex-HMS Pickle), two Canadian-built "River" class frigates HMCyS Mahasena (ex-HMCS Orkney, Violetta and ex-Israeli ship Mivtach), HMCyS Gajabahu (ex-HMCS Hallowell, ex-Israeli Misnak) and an oceangoing tug (ex-HMS Adept). The RCyN took part in several joint naval exercises and a goodwill missions. Commodore Royce de Mel became the first Ceylonese to head the navy as he was appointed Captain of the RCyN in 1955. In 1959, the navy took over the strategic Royal Naval Dockyard, Trincomalee as the last of the British forces in Ceylon withdrew. In 1960, flexing its blue water capability a naval fleet undertook a deployment to the far east. Its return resulted in scandal as a search for contraband took place. A Commission of Inquiry into the incident resulted in the dismissal of several officers (with commissions withdrawn and others retired) and the compulsory retirement of Rear Admiral de Mel, who was thereafter implicated in an attempt military coup d'état in 1962.

==== Stagnation ====
In the aftermath of the attempted coup, the armed forces saw major budget cuts that dramatically halted the expansion it enjoyed in the 1950s. Under N. Q. Dias, the Ministry of External Affairs and Defence changed its defence policy taking steps to prevent a further coup attempts. Joint operations among armed services were stopped, with the army to focused on internal security and the role of the navy was scaled down. As a result, several of its ships were sold off and its size reduced by the stoppage of recruitment of officers cadets and sailors for over seven years, the loss of important bases and barracks and the stoppage of training in the United Kingdom. Two batches of 300 ratings were recruited in 1966 and 1969.

=== Insurrection ===
As a result, in 1971 the navy was poorly equipped and short of personnel when the 1971 JVP Insurrection broke out. RCyN had only one warship, HMCyS Gajabahu which was not put to sea as its crew were dispatched with other naval personnel for shore duty. RCyN initially mounted the defence of ports and thereafter carryout offensive counterinsurgency operations against the insurgents. During the insurrection navy suffered its first combat casualties and went on to man detention centres to rehabilitate surrendered insurgents after it was crushed in a few months. Ceylon, however, had to rely on the Indian Navy to established an exclusion zone around the island.

With the JVP insurrection, the Government felt the limitations of the RCyN and the need to strengthen the navy. The People's Republic of China gifted two Type 062-class gunboat and these were commissioned in February 1972, while three more were ordered.

=== Navy of the Republic ===
Sri Lanka Navy Ensign.

In July 1972 the "Dominion of Ceylon" became the "Democratic Socialist Republic of Sri Lanka" and the Royal Ceylon Navy became the Sri Lanka Navy. The ensign, along with the Flag Officers' flags, were redesigned. The term "Captain of the Navy", introduced in the Navy Act, was changed to "Commander of the Navy", in keeping with the terminology adopted by the other two services. Finally, "Her Majesty's Ceylon Ships" (HMCyS) became "Sri Lankan Naval Ships" (SLNS).

SLN received three more Type 062-class gunboats in December 1972, while the USSR gifted a Shershen-class torpedo boat in 1975. These gunboats allowed the SLN to carry out effective coastal patrolling and several cruises to regional ports. New bases were established to counter smuggling operations in the coastal areas. Five inshore patrol crafts were ordered from Cheverton, while six coastal patrol craft were built by the Colombo Dockyards.

=== Civil war ===
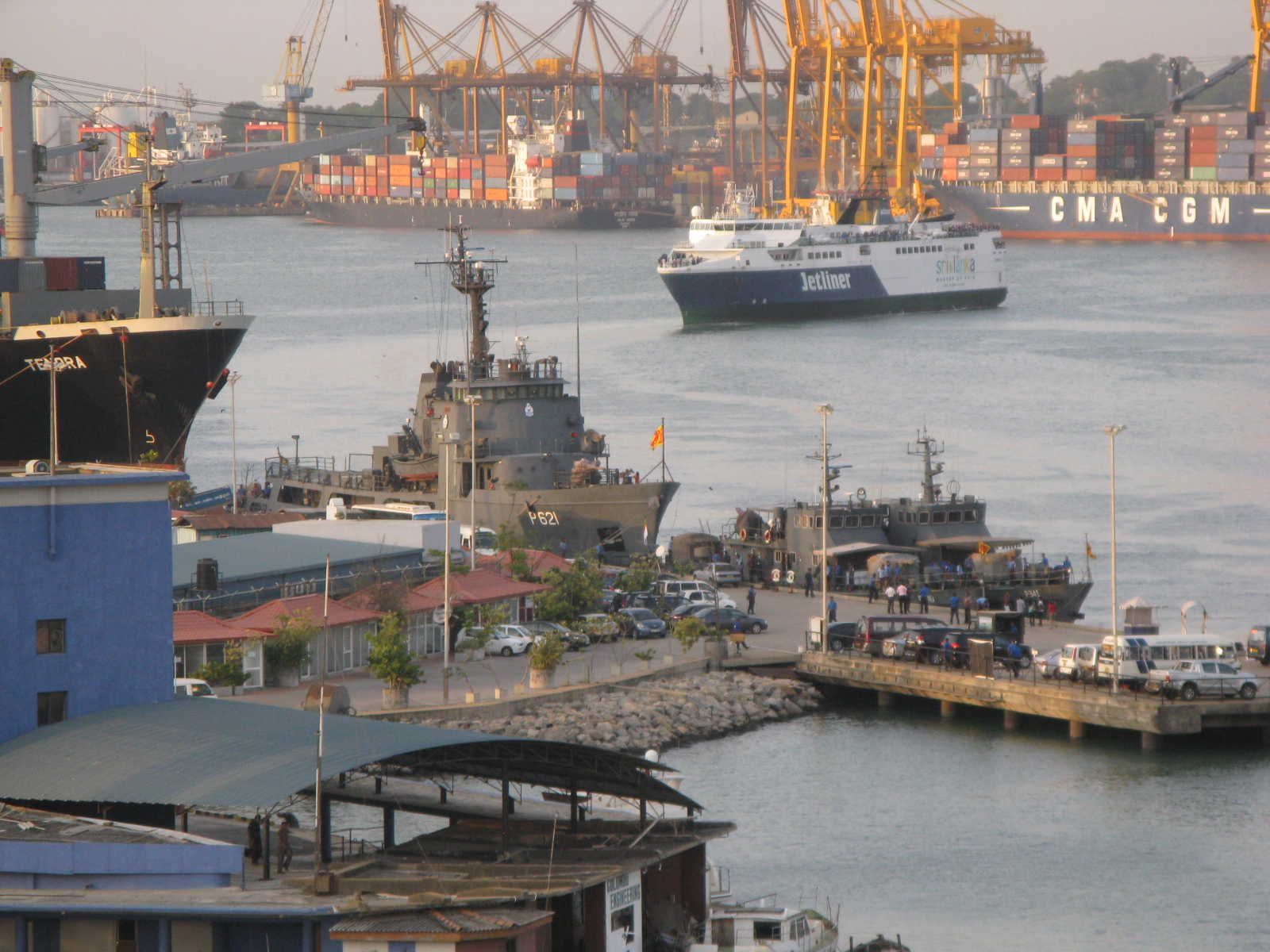
SLNS Samudura, fast gun boats and troopship JetLiner in the Colombo harbour.

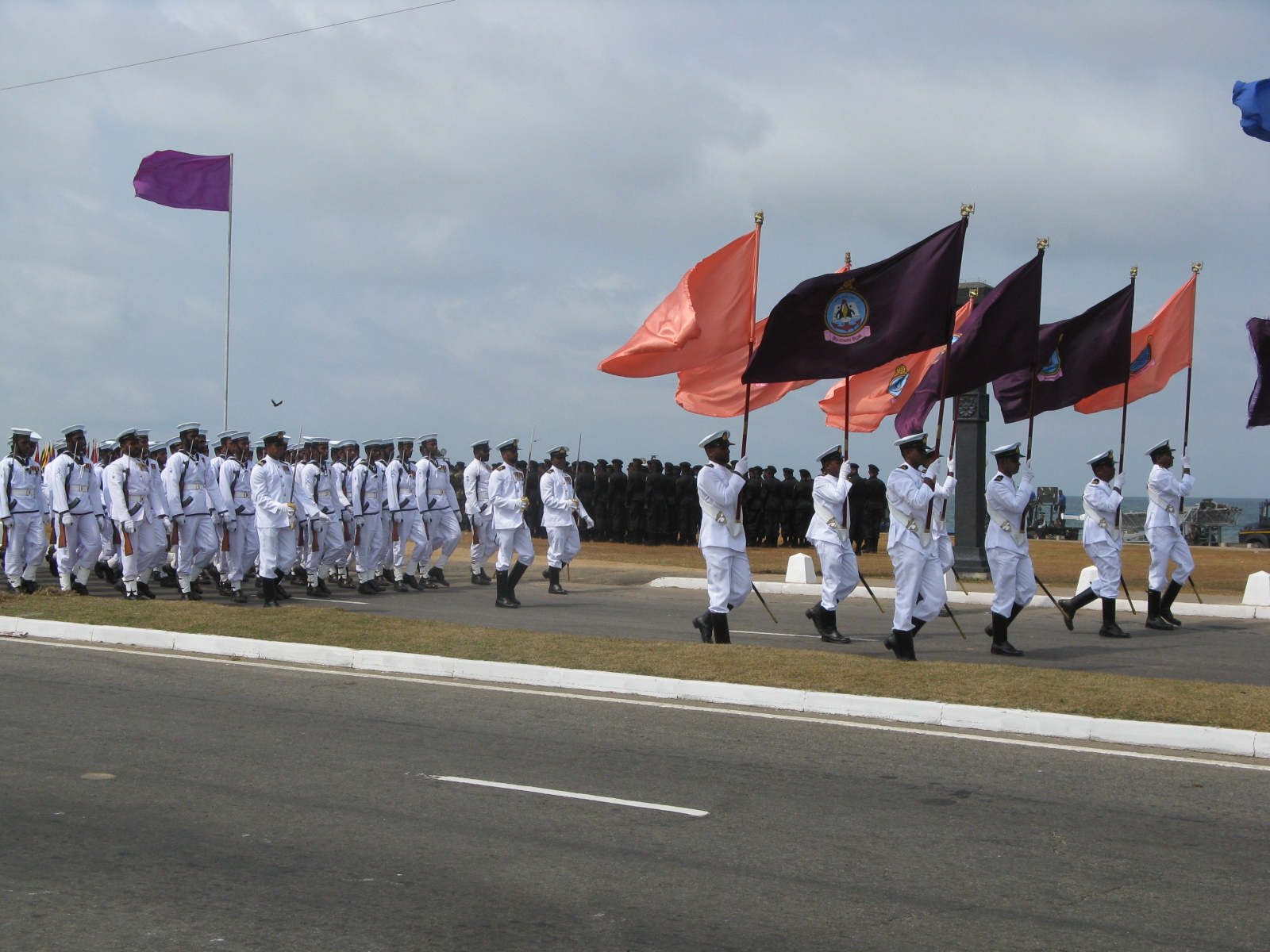
Sri Lanka Navy personnel on Independence Day parade.

At the begin of the civil war in the 1980s the navy found itself poorly equipped to face the new threats the LTTE created. It found itself engaging in anti-smuggling operations to counter LTTE gun running between India and Sri Lanka. As the larger gun boats proved ineffective against faster small boats used by the LTTE with outboard motors, the navy began deploying small boats with waterjets and inshore patrol boats armed with machine guns to police its waters. The LTTE responded with mounting machine guns and attacking the navy boats. This began an asymmetric war at sea, taking place primarily in the coastal waters among small boats of the navy and the LTTE naval arm the Sea Tigers. The decades long conflict saw the escalation of the size, firepower and speed of the boats with new techniques deployed by both sides. The Sea Tigers mastered the art of using sophisticated suicide crafts against naval vessels both small and large. The navy acquired in the late 1980s Israeli Dvora-class fast patrol boats which it designated as Fast Attack Crafts (FAC). The FACs of the Fast Attack Flotilla became the workhorses of the navy's offensive and defensive operations against the Sea Tigers. In the 1990s and 2000s Super Dvora class boats were added and a locally built Colombo class was introduced in larger numbers. These proved highly successful in limiting the LTTE's use of the seas.

During the war the navy increased its fleet of larger vessels by introducing two locally built Jayasagara class offshore patrol vessels and purchasing several more Type 062-class gunboats. The navy lost several ships in the 1990s to Sea Tiger attacks by suicide crafts such as in the sinking of SLNS Sagarawardena and SLNS Ranaviru and the use of suicide frogmen such as in the bombing of SLNS Sooraya and SLNS Ranasuru. Due to the threat posed by the Sea Tigers, the navy had to undertake convoy duty to escort shipping to the Jaffna peninsula to which all land routes were controlled by the LTTE. In order keep supply lines open to Jaffna, the navy employed several auxiliary ships. It also deployed auxiliary ships to support FACs.

In the early 1980s a land combat force named Naval Patrolmen was created which at first limited itself to base defence and, as its numbers increased, took part in offensive operations against the LTTE along with the Sri Lankan Army. An elite naval special forces unit called the Special Boat Squadron was created in the late 1980s based on the British Special Boat Service.

In order to support ground operations of the army, landing ships and boats were acquired. In early 1990s the SLN carried out in conjunction with the army its first amphibious operation code named Operation Sea Breeze followed by the larger Operation Balavegaya a year later and on the seas it began an aggressive clamp down on LTTE actives including gunrunning. In 1992, Admiral W.W.E. Clancy Fernando, the commander of the navy was assassinated by a suicide bomb attack by the LTTE.

The mid-1990s saw a slow expansion of larger fleet assets with addition of newer Type 062-class gun boats and a Haiqing class submarine chaser being added to the fleet to intercept arms shipments destined for the Tigers within Sri Lankan territorial waters. In 2000 the Navy started a fleet air arm (FAA) by acquiring a HAL Chetak from India to expand its surveillance capability by operating from newly acquired Offshore Patrol Vessels. During the same time conventional warfare capability was increased by the addition of Sa'ar 4-class missile boats. In 2004, the navy received a Reliance-class cutter from the United States Excess Defense Articles (EDA) program.

Following the resumption of hostilities between the government of Sri Lanka and the LTTE since early 2006, the navy took up an active role in limiting the LTTE's use of the seas. This resulted in several major sea battles occurring during the course of 2006, 2007 and 2009. Most significant of the events during this time was the interception and sinking of several large cargo ships that were bringing illegal arms shipments to the LTTE in the Indian Ocean in international waters (Sri Lanka Navy anti arms smuggling operations). These naval operations have proven the blue water capability of the Sri Lankan Navy.

During the war the navy, along with the army, developed its own weapons development programmes to produce and maintain weapon systems suited for indigenous requirements in collaboration with Colombo Dockyard which included the Jayasagara class, Colombo class and the Ranavijaya class; while the navy designed and developed the Arrow class.

==== Major operations ====
Apart from continued deployments at sea the navy has played a significant role in supporting all major operations carried out by the Army including several amphibious operations.

- 1971 JVP Insurrection (1971–1972)
- Eelam War I (1976–1987)
  - Vadamarachchi Operation
- JVP Uprising (1987–1990)
- Eelam War II (1990–1995)
  - Operation Sea Breeze (Sri Lanka)
  - Operation Thrividha Balaya
  - Operation Balavegaya I, II
- Eelam War III (1995–2002)
  - Operation Riviresa
  - Operation Thrivida Pahara
  - Operation Jayasikurui
  - Operation Kinihira I, II, III/IV, V/VI, VII, VIII, IX
- Eelam War IV (2006–2009)
  - Eastern Theatre
  - Northern Theatre
  - Anti arms smuggling operations in the Indian Ocean
- After 2015
  - Operation Prosperity Guardian (2024)
  - Sinking of IRIS Dena

=== After the war ===
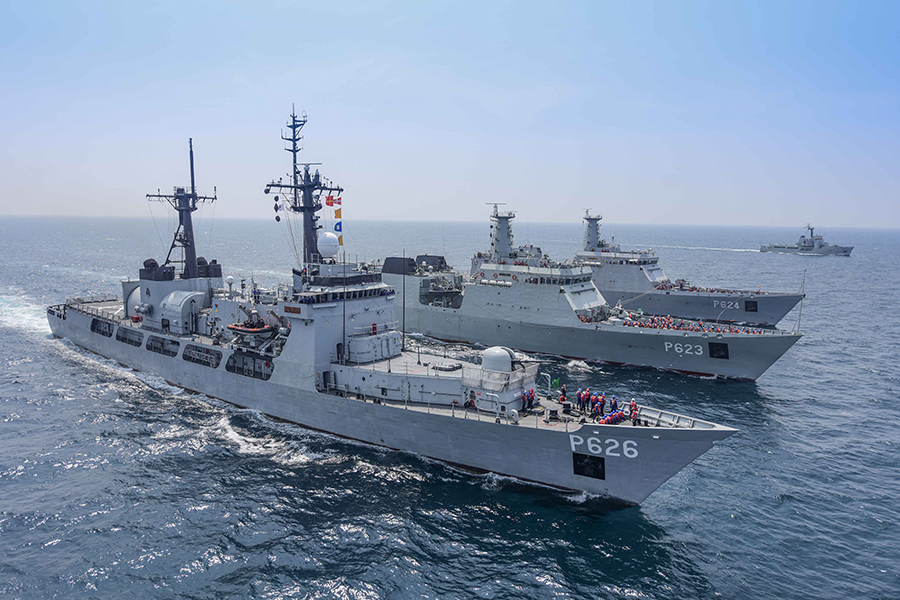
SLNS Gajabahu (P626), SLNS Sayurala (P623) and SLNS Sindurala (P624) during 2022 Colombo Naval Exercise. SLNS Samudura (P261) also visible in the distance.

With the end of the civil war, the navy has begun reorienting itself for the future defence of the island. This has led to force redeployment, training exercises and transfer of certain duties to the newly formed Sri Lanka Coast Guard. In the post war years the navy has expanded its maritime operations to fisheries control and to counter human trafficking. Operations to counter illegal poaching by Tamil Nadu fishermen have led to allegations that personnel from the Sri Lanka Navy have attacked more than twelve fishermen, two of whom have died, in a series of disputes. Australia transferred two Bay-class patrol boats to the Sri Lanka Navy, following its Prime Minister's visit to the island for the Commonwealth Heads of Government Meeting in November 2013. The first of these vessels was delivered in April 2014.

==== Blue water navy ====
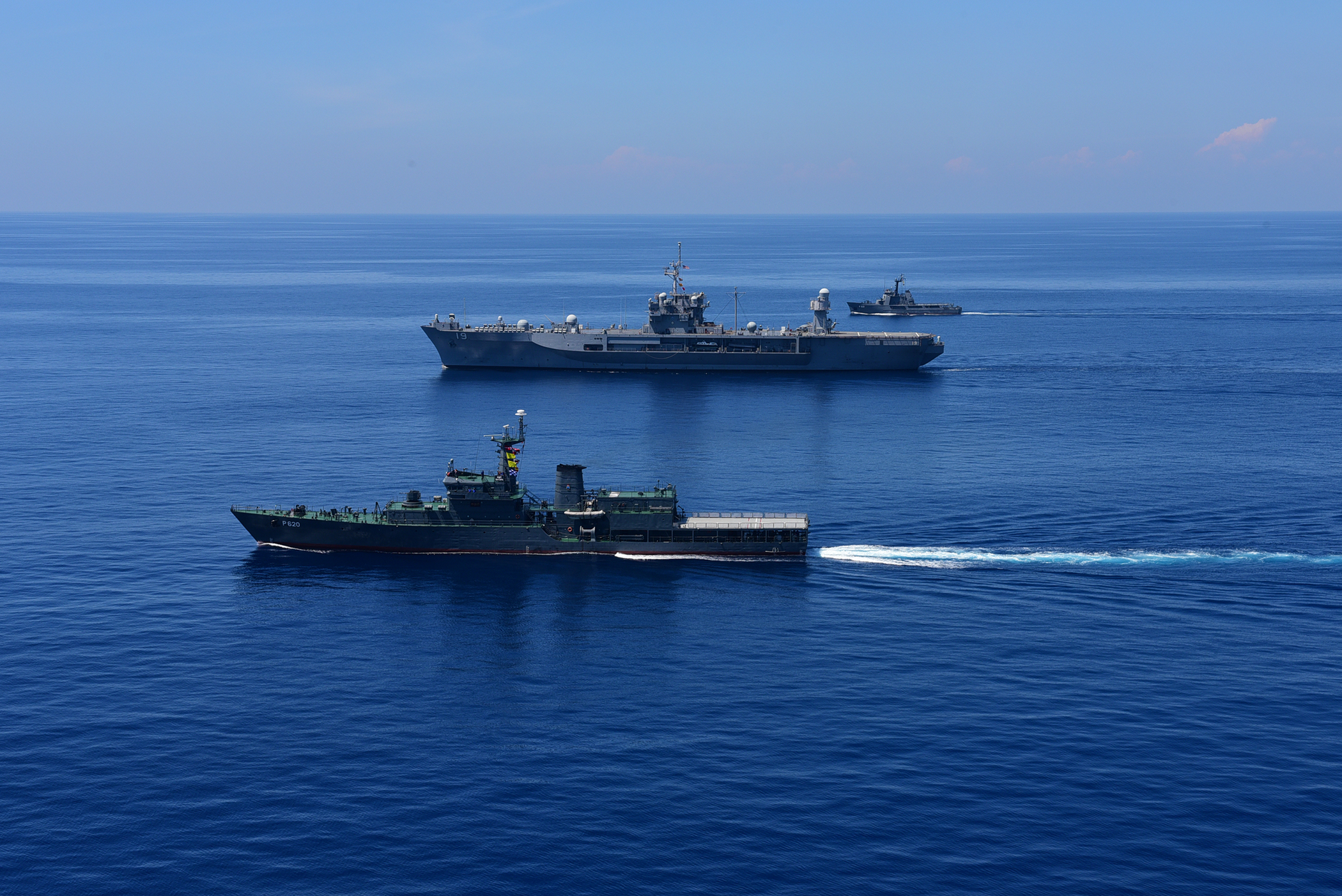
The U.S. 7th Fleet flagship USS Blue Ridge manoeuvres into formation with SLNS Sayura and SLNS Samudura.

Expanding its blue water capability the navy began commissioning larger fleet assets equivalent to Patrol frigates, which it termed as Advanced Offshore Patrol Vessels. In April and August 2018 two 105m long vessels of the Saryu-class were commissioned. Built by Goa Shipyard on order to the Sri Lanka navy, these were the largest purpose built ships for the Sri Lanka Navy.

In 2017, SLNS Sayurala took part in Southeast Asian Nations (ASEAN) International Fleet Review 2017 in Thailand. This is the longest foreign tour (21 days) an SLN Ship undertook after the year 1965 with 127 sailors including 18 officers. This followed in 2018 by SLNS Sagara which sailed to Indonesia to attend the Multilateral Naval Exercise “Komodo” and “International Fleet Review” (IFR) 2018, while SLNS Samudura and SLNS Suranimala sailed to India to take part in Milan. The navy participated in Exercise RIMPAC for the first time in 2018, sending a contingent of marines to the international maritime exercise.

In August 2018, the navy took over a Hamilton-class high endurance cutter which was transferred to the Navy from United States under the EDA program. Commissioned in June 2019 as an Advanced Offshore Patrol Vessel, it became the largest combat vessel in the Sri Lankan navy at 3250 tonnes and second former United States cutter in its service.

In June 2019, the navy took over a Type 053H2G frigate which was transferred to the Navy from China. It will be armed with dual Type 79 100 mm naval guns and two Type 76A dual-37 mm anti-aircraft guns to function as an Advanced Offshore Patrol Vessel.

In August 2021, the navy dispatched its Landing Ship, Tank SLNS Shakthi to sail to the Port of Chennai to sealift urgently needed medical grade oxygen needed for the COVID-19 situation in the island. On 26 October 2021, the navy formally took over the second Hamilton-class high endurance cutter transferred from the United States at the USCG Station Seattle under the EDA program. It reached its home port in 2022, following a seven-month refit in Seattle.

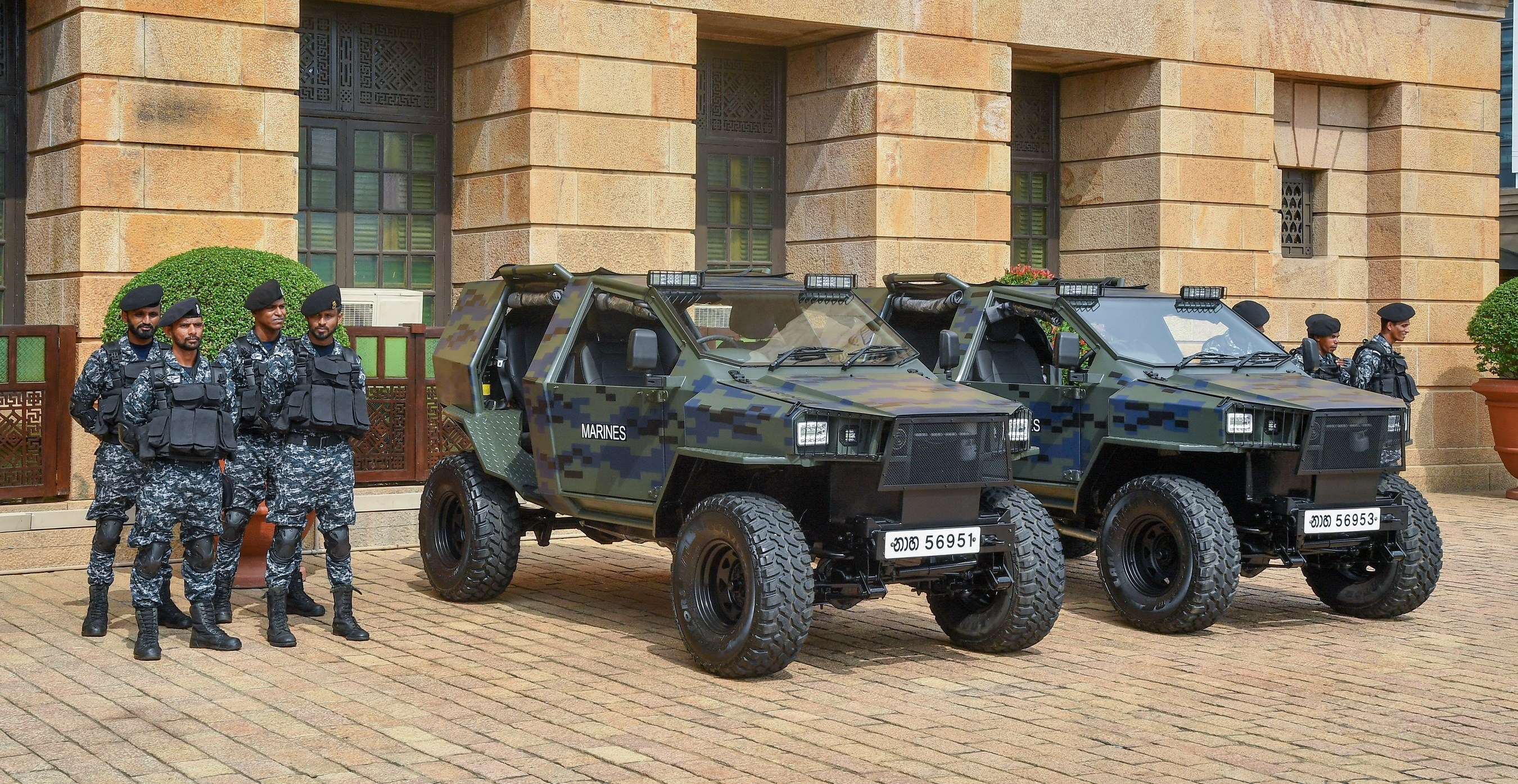
Sri Lanka Navy Marines new locally made Combat All-Terrain Vehicles (CATVs)

In March 2022, the Government of Sri Lanka signed several defence agreements with the Government of India which included the establishment of a Maritime Rescue Coordinating Centre on an Indian grant as well as the acquisition of Dornier 228 maritime reconnaissance aircraft to the Sri Lanka Air Force to operate with naval personnel. A 4,000 ton floating dock constructed by Goa Shipyard was also acquired as part of a grant from India, to facilitate repair and maintenance of larger fleet units based at Trincomalee instead of having to depend dry dock facilities in Colombo.

In January 2024, the President of Sri Lanka announced plans to deploy a navy ship to the Red Sea to join the maritime coalition defending shipping against increased attacks by Houthi rebels in Yemen. The navy has deployed one of its five Advanced Offshore Patrol Vessels to the Red Sea as part of Operation Prosperity Guardian.

The navy responded to the distress call issued in the Sinking of IRIS Dena off the Sri Lankan southern coast in the early hours of 4 March 2026, deploying two vessels rescuing 32 survivors.

== Current deployments ==
As of present, most of the Sri Lankan Navy is deployed for domestic defence with the end of combat operations, while foreign deployments are carried out from time to time.

=== Domestic ===
Due to the Sri Lankan Civil War the navy has been on a constant mobilised (including reservist) state since the 1980s (except for a brief period from 2002 to 2005). The majority of the naval units both at sea and ground-based are deployed in the North and Eastern provinces of the country, as well as in other parts of the country. The security of all major ports of the country is the responsibility of the navy, due to terrorist activity. Fisheries protection in the territorial waters and the Exclusive economic zone of Sri Lanka.

=== Foreign ===
- Haiti - Since 2004 navy personnel have been attached to the Sri Lankan contingent of the United Nations Stabilization Mission in Haiti.
- Red Sea - Since January 2024, the navy has deployed a ship as part of the Operation Prosperity Guardian.

== Command, control and organisation ==
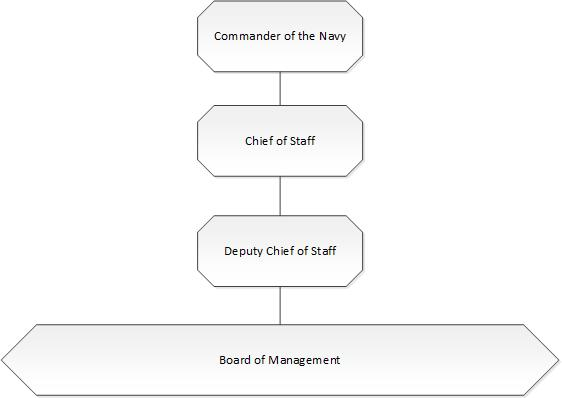
Command structure of the Sri Lanka Navy.

The professional head of the navy is the Commander of the Navy (C of N) who reports directly to the Minister of Defence. The Commander of the Navy exercises operational and administrative control of the Navy from Naval Headquarters in SLNS Parakrama, Colombo. He is assisted by the Chief of Staff (C of S); who along with Directors General and Directors comprise the Board of Management (BOM) and Board of Directors (BOD) of the Sri Lanka Navy.

=== Leadership ===
Post	Rank	Incumbent
Commander of the Navy	Vice Admiral	Kanchana Banagoda
Chief of Staff	Rear Admiral	KDDC Fernando
Deputy Chief of Staff	Rear Admiral	WDCU Kumarasinghe

=== Board of Management ===
The following posts make up the Board of Management:

- Director General Operations
- Director General Health Services
- Director General Logistics
- Commandant Volunteer Naval Force
- Director General Budget & Finance
- Director General Personnel
- Director General Administration
- Director General Electrical and Electronic Engineering
- Director General Training
- Director General Engineering
- Director General Civil Engineering
- Director General Services
- Commandant Naval Infantry
- Secretary to Commander of the Navy and Naval Secretary
- Naval Assistant to The Commander of The Navy

=== Commands ===
The Naval Areas of Operations. Note that the Southern and Eastern areas overlap (stripes).

The Navy has seven commands known as Naval Area Commands, each under the control of a flag officer for effective command and administrative control. This is in order to efficiently maintain all ships, crafts and vehicles; and to ensure the operational readiness of commands and units each area shall have its own harbour/ base, repair and refitting facilities, signal centres, logistic, civil engineering and medical facilities.

Seven Naval Area Commands (see image to the right)

- Northern Naval Area (NNA)
- North Central Naval Area (NCNA)
- North Western Naval Area (NWNA)
- Western Naval Area (WNA)
- Southern Naval Area (SNA)
- Eastern Naval Area (ENA)
- South Eastern Naval Area (SENA)

=== Units ===
- 3rd Fast Gun Boats Squadron (3 FGS)
- 4th Fast Attack Flotilla (4 FAF)
- 7th Surveillance Command Squadron
- Special Boat Squadron
- Rapid Action Boat Squadron
- Sri Lanka Marine Corps
- Naval Boat Building Yard

=== Branches ===
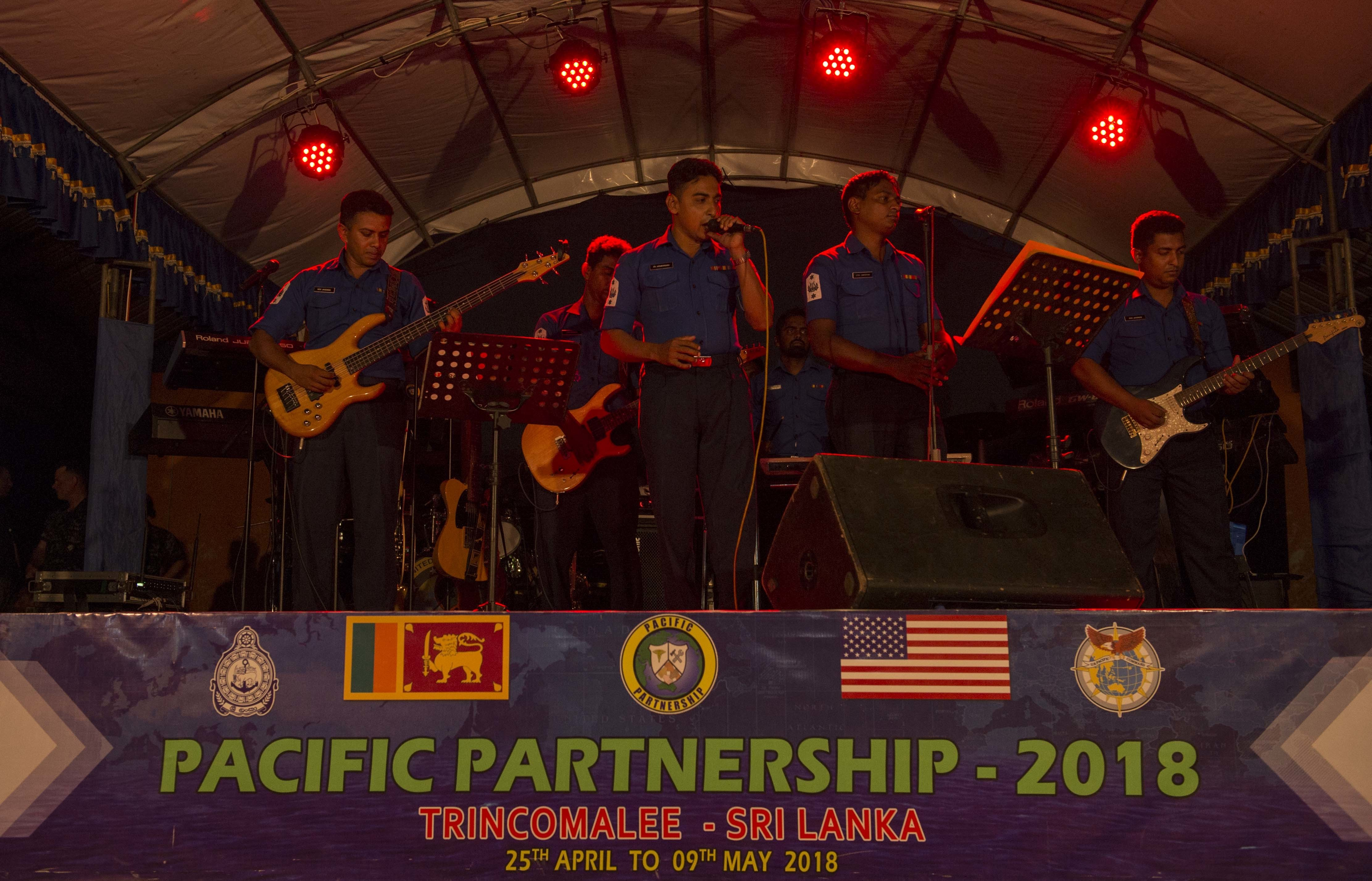
Members of the Sri Lanka Navy Band perform at Mattur Public Grounds during a community relations event in 2018.

Sri Lanka Navy consists following branches to which personnel are attached to;

- Executive Branch
  - Navigation and Direction
  - Communications
  - Gunnery
  - Missiles
  - Anti-Submarine Warfare (ASW)
  - Diving
  - Hydrography
- Engineering Branch
- Medical Branch
- Logistics Branch
- Electrical & Electronics Engineering Branch
- Naval Patrolman Branch
- Information Technology Branch
- Musical Branch
- Legal Branch
- Provost Branch

== Training ==
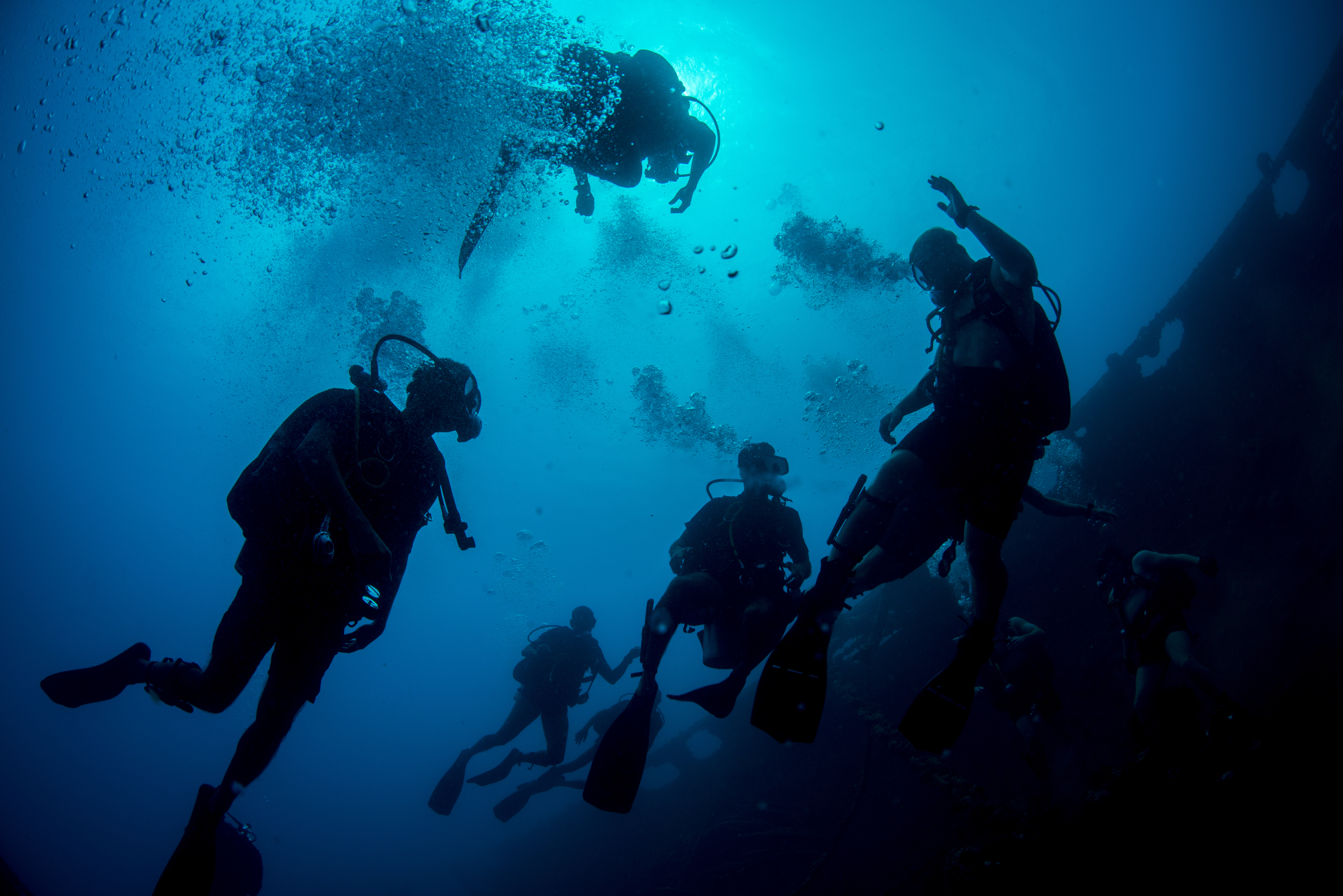
Sri Lankan Navy divers and their US counterparts during a joint diving exercise in the Apra Harbor off the coast of Guam

At the formation of the Royal Ceylon Navy in 1950, it looked to the Royal Navy to its training in the formational years. Naval rating training was initiated locally with Royal Navy instructors at Royal Naval Dockyard, Trincomalee while officer cadets and specialist training took place in the United Kingdom. Initial batches of officer cadets were sent to Britannia Royal Naval College, along with specialised training at trade schools of the Royal Navy, while senior officers were sent to the Royal Naval College, Greenwich and to the Royal College of Defence Studies. Following the resuspension of recruitment following the suspension from 1962 to 1967, the Naval and Maritime Academy was established for basic officer training. With the rapid expansion of the Sri Lankan armed forces in the 1980s and 1990s saw the establishment of local specialist and trade schools in the navy, along with staff colleges and a defence university. At present the Director General Training directs all naval training establishments.

All pre-commissioning training for officers are carried out at the Naval and Maritime Academy (NMA) at the SLN Dockyard in Trincomalee and short/specialised officer training is conducted at the SLNS Gemunu, Welisara. This training includes theoretical aspects covered at the training institute followed by a practical exposure on board the Sri Lanka Navy fleet at sea. The Naval & Maritime Academy also has specialist schools for training areas such as ASW, diving, medicine, combat, NBCD and sniper. It also conducts the Sub Lieutenant Technical Course for newly commissioned officers, the Junior Naval Staff Course for staff officers and the Long Logistics Management Course (LLMC) for logistics officers of the navy. The General Sir John Kotelawala Defence University (KDU) formed in 1981 and situated in Ratmalana, fourteen kilometres south of Colombo, is Sri Lanka's only university specialising in defence studies. Apart from postgraduate defence studies each year, approximately fifty cadets from all three services are admitted to the university (aged 18–22) to participate in a three-year programme of under graduate studies.

Senior officers of the ranks of Lieutenant Commander and Commander follow the Command and Staff Course at the Defence Services Command and Staff College (DSCSC) at Batalanda, Makola which allows officers to gain a Masters Of Science (Defence Studies) degree from the KDU. Senior officers destined for flag rank attend the prestigious National Defence College (NDC) in Colombo which is the highest level of training leading to a Master of Philosophy from the KDU. The navy continuous to send its senior officers for overseas training.

Basic training for new recruits (approximately six months) are conducted at Advanced Naval Training Centre, SLNS 'Nipuna'; Naval Institute of Technology, SLNS 'Thakshila', Welisara; and at Naval Recruit Training Centres at several shore establishments. This basic training will be followed by on-the-job training on-board fleet units and at shore establishments. Combat Training School at SLNS 'Pandukabaya' conducts combat training for Naval Patrolmen.

Additional training is carried out in UK, India, Pakistan and Australia.

Main training establishments

- Naval & Maritime Academy - SLN Dockyard
- Advanced Naval Training Centre - SLNS Nipuna
- Naval Artificer Training Institute - SLNS Thakshila
- Naval Recruit Training Centre - SLNS Shiksha
- Naval Recruit Training Centre/Combat Training School - SLNS Pandukabaya

== Current fleet ==
The Sri Lankan Naval fleet consists of above 250 combat, support ships and inshore patrol craft, with most originating from the United States, China, India, Israel. While Naval Boat Building Yard, Colombo Dockyard provide locally.

=== Ships ===
Type	Vessels	Image
Advanced Offshore Patrol Vessels equivalent to traditional patrol frigates	SLNS Gajabahu; SLNS Sayurala; SLNS Sindurala; SLNS Parakramabahu; SLNS Vijayabahu	
Offshore Patrol Vessels; Deployed on the high seas to carry out surveillance and interception of illegal arms smuggling and to monitor naval activity within the EEZ.	SLNS Sayura; SLNS Samudura; SLNS Sagara; SLNS Samudravijaya	
Fast Missile Vessels Provide a multi-role platform for different operations undertaken by the navy.	First added to the SLN in 2001 when two Israeli Saar 4 class missile boats were acquired. These vessels, which are referred to as the Nandimithra class and are equipped with Gabriel II anti-ship missiles, increasing the SLN's conventional warfare capability.	
Fast Gun Boats (FGB) Used to carry out a multi-role missions from coastal patrols to shore bombardment in support of amphibious operations.	FGBs consist of ships from the Chinese Lushun class, Haizhui class and Shanghai II class.	-
Patrol Boats	Bay-class patrol boats are the latest type of craft to be added to the fleet. They were given to Sri Lanka by the Australian government in 2013, to help the Sri Lanka Navy's efforts to reduce smuggling and other illegal trafficking. The first of these was delivered in April 2014. They were commissioned in July 2014 as SLNS Rathnadeepa and SLNS Mihikatha.	
Fast Attack Craft	They are primarily deployed in offensive operations for the denial of sea, they were also used for defensive operations to prevent Sea Tiger suicide craft from attacking both naval and civilian ships by operating as escorts. There are several classes of FACs in SL Navy.: Super Dvora Mk III; Super Dvora Mk II; Dvora - Mk I; Shaldag class; Colombo class	
Inshore Patrol Craft	Inshore Patrol Craft are small vessels (14 metres long) which are capable of operating inshore as well as for beaching. They are capable of speeds in excess of 30 knots and are used for small boat operations, harbour defence and amphibious operations.	
Littoral Attack Craft Littoral Warfare Craft have a high degree of firepower for vessels their size. Introduced in 2006, these boats are manufactured by the SLN's own boatyard and used by the elite Special Boat Squadron (SBS) and the Rapid Action Boat Squadron (RABS) for small boat operations.	Littoral Warfare Craft are small (7 metres long) and highly manoeuvrable Arrow class attack speedboats.	-
Amphibious Warfare Vessels	The SLN has several vessels to support amphibious operations it carries out. These include Yuhai class Tank landing ship SLNS Shathi; Ranavijaya class utility landing crafts (Locally built); Yunnan class mechanised landing crafts and an ABS M-10 Utility craft air cushion.	
Auxiliary Vessels Fast personnel carriers are catamarans which were used for both troop and civilian transport, running the gauntlet of LTTE suicide craft. SLNs fleet of non-commissioned underway replenishment ships have been used recently for replenishment at sea in international waters.	The Navy also has several auxiliary vessels such as fast personnel carriers and replenishment ships.	
Floating Dock	4,000-tonne category being acquired from Goa Shipyard. Was launched on 19 February 2026.	

=== Main Naval Weapons Systems ===
- Gabriel - Anti-ship missile
- Oto Melara 76 mm naval artillery
- PJ33A 100 mm dual gun naval artillery
- Typhoon - Naval Optronic Stabilized Weapon Platforms
- M242 Bushmaster - 25 mm (25x137mm) chain-fed autocannon
- Naval variant of a locally developed guided missile and 40-barrel and 20-barrel MRLS to be soon installed on naval vessels

== Naval exercises ==
Sri Lanka often conducts and participates in naval exercises with other friendly forces and countries designed to increase naval cooperation and also to strengthen cooperative security relationships.

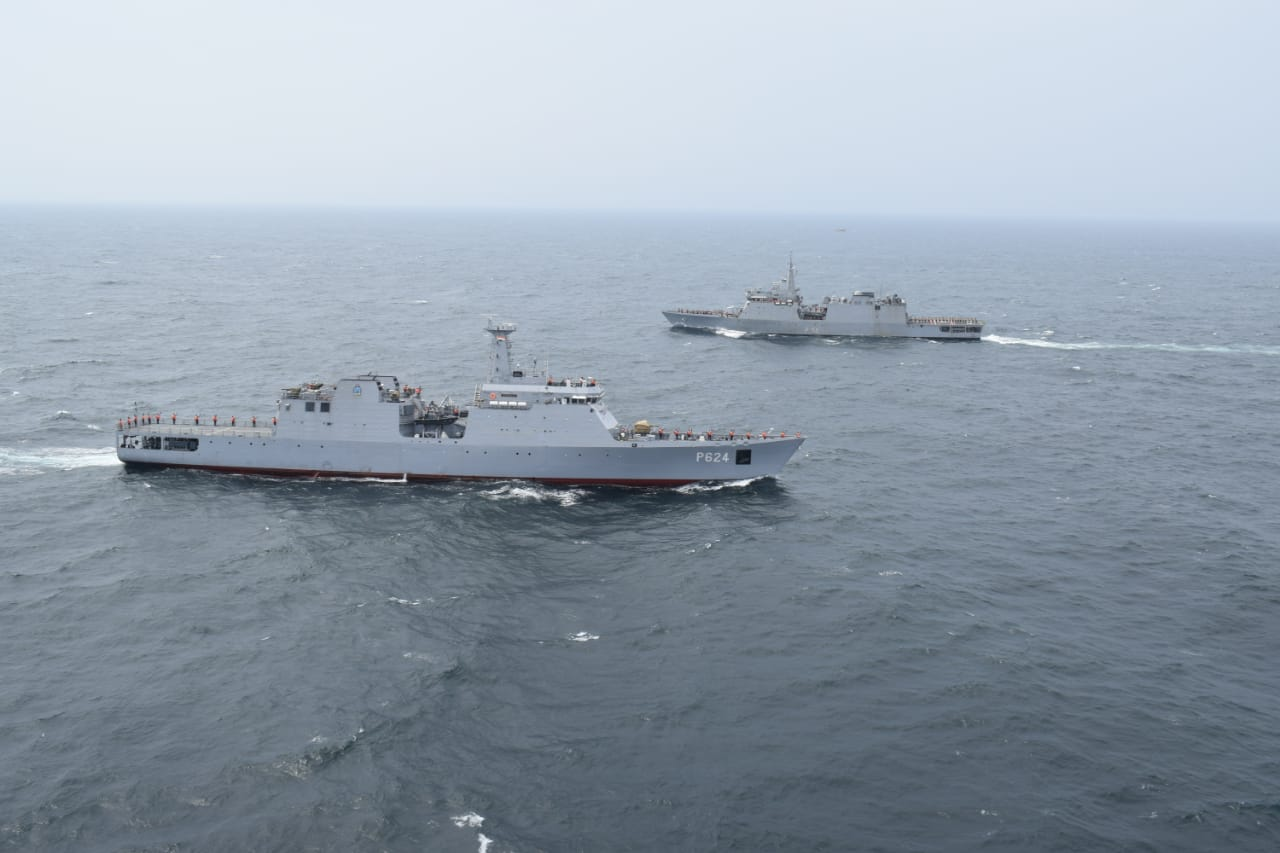
SLNS Sindurala and INS Sumedha during SLINEX 2019

Exercise	Navy/Navies/Air Forces	First Edition	Last Edition	Total Editions	Notes/ References
CONEX	Sri Lanka Coast Guard, Sri Lanka Air Force	2019	2023	5	
SLINEX	Indian Navy	2012	2022	9	
Exercise Dosti	Indian Coast Guard, Maldives National Defence Force		2024	16	

== Marine battalion ==
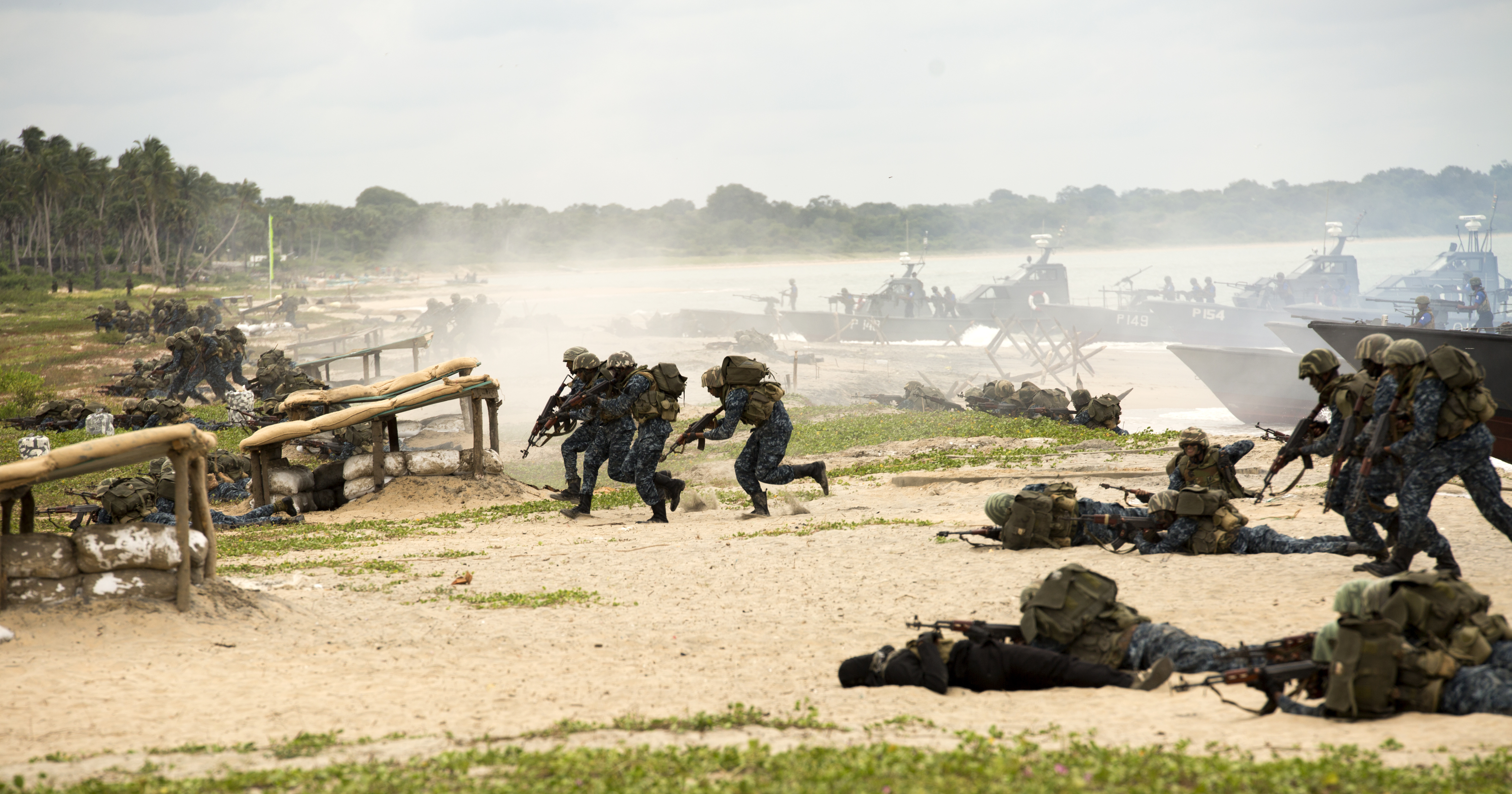
Sri Lankan Marines in an amphibious capabilities demonstration during the Sri Lanka Marine Corps Boot Camp graduation at Sri Lankan Naval Station Barana in Mullikulum, Sri Lanka, Feb. 27, 2017.

In 2016, the Sri Lanka Navy formed its first battalion of Marines specialising in amphibious warfare. The unit started training under the assistance of the 11th Marine Expeditionary Unit of the United States Marine Corps in November 2016 and received further training from the Commando Regiment of Sri Lanka Army.

The first group consisting of 164 Marines, consisting of 6 officers and 158 sailors, passed out on 27 February 2017 from Naval Base SLNS Barana in Mullikulam in a ceremony attended by the President Maithripala Sirisena, and the Commander of the Navy Vice Admiral Ravindra Wijegunaratne alongside the tri-force Commanders and other senior officers. On July 29, 2017, Vice Admiral Wijegunarathna opened the new Marine Headquarters, SLNS Vidura in Sampoor, Trincomalee.

== Notable personnel ==
=== Parama Weera Vibhushanaya recipients ===
The Parama Weera Vibhushanaya is the highest award for valour awarded in the Sri Lankan armed forces. Navy recipients include;

- Lieutenant Commander Jude Lakmal Wijethunge †
- Chief Petty Officer K. G. Shantha †

=== Notable fallen members ===
Over 23,790 Sri Lankan armed forces personnel were killed since the start of the civil war in 1981 to its end in 2009, this includes 2 admirals killed in active duty or assassinated. 659 service personnel were killed due to the second JVP insurrection from 1987 to 1990. 53 service personnel were killed and 323 were wounded in the first JVP insurrection from 1971 to 1972. Notable fallen members includes;

- Admiral W.W.E. Clancy Fernando † - Commander of the Navy
- Rear admiral Mohan Jayamaha † - Commander, Northern Naval Area

== Women in the Sri Lanka Navy ==
Women in the Sri Lanka Navy were taken for the first time in 1985; For women in the Sri Lanka Navy, there is no separate branch or department. Women can join both as officers and sailors.

Today women are recruited to both the regular and volunteer forces. At first limited to the medical branch, currently females are able to join all branches of the navy. In 2007, the navy appointed its first-ever female Commodore, Surgeon Commodore Indranee Y. Amarasinghe.

== Ranks ==
The following tables present the military ranks and insignia of the Sri Lanka Navy. These ranks generally correspond with those of Royal Navy, and reflect those of the British ratings and officer ranks. Sri Lanka does have an Admiral rank, but it was usually only awarded to the Chief of Defence Staff (CDS) and the navy commander on the day of his retirement.

Officers

Rank group	General / flag officers					Senior officers			Junior officers
Sri Lanka Navy
Sri Lanka Navy	Admiral of the fleet	Admiral	Vice admiral	Rear admiral	Commodore	Captain	Commander	Lieutenant commander	Lieutenant	Sub-lieutenant	Midshipman

Other ranks

Rank group	Senior NCOs				Junior NCOs		Enlisted
Sri Lanka Navy						No insignia	No insignia
Sri Lanka Navy	Master chief petty officer	Fleet chief petty officer	Chief petty officer	Petty officer	Leading seaman	Able seaman	Seaman recruit

== Future of Sri Lanka Navy ==
The Sri Lanka Navy set a medium-term fleet expansion goal targeting ten new vessels in its 'Sri Lanka Navy 2025' plan as part of its expansion of blue water operations.

According to the Maritime Doctrine of Sri Lanka (MDSL) published in 2020, the establishment of Naval Aviation consisting of helicopters and drones have been proposed and initial steps have been taken.

Naval variant of a locally developed guided missile and 40-barrel and 20-barrel MRLS to be soon installed on naval vessels.

The Navy planned to purchase a locally constructed 110m OPV and 10 45m Fast Patrol Boats from the Colombo Dockyard PLC, alongside a 95.6m corvette from China. However, the plans were suspended in 2022 due to the lack of funds and instead the navy decided to obtain similar vessels for free from friendly countries. In January 2024 the United States deputy secretary of state for management and resources Richard R. Verma stated that the US will provide another Offshore Patrol Vessel to the Sri Lanka Navy.

== See also ==
- Military of Sri Lanka
- Commander of the Navy (Sri Lanka)
- Military ranks and insignia of the Sri Lanka Navy
- Fast Attack Flotilla
- Special Boat Squadron (Sri Lanka)
- Rapid Action Boat Squadron
- Naval and Maritime Academy
- Hoods Tower Museum
- Sri Lankan Civil War
