= Sri Lanka Navy anti arms smuggling operations =

- Part of Eelam War IV of the Sri Lankan Civil War
Date	September 2006 – October 2007
Location	Indian Ocean (from south of Sri Lanka to near Indonesia and Australia)
Result	Decisive Sri Lanka Navy victory: Sinking of 6 LTTE floating armoury merchant vessels; Sinking of 11 LTTE supply trawlers; Major disruption to LTTE logistics and hardware supply

Belligerents
Sri Lanka	Liberation Tigers of Tamil Eelam

Commanders and leaders
Wasantha Karannagoda (Commander of the Navy)	Velupillai Prabhakaran; Soosai

Units involved
Sri Lanka Armed Forces; Sri Lanka Navy	Liberation Tigers of Tamil Eelam; Sea Tigers

Strength
Deep-sea task forces (Offshore Patrol Vessels, Fast Missile Vessels)	6 rogue merchant ships 11 supply trawlers

Casualties and losses
None reported	6 merchant vessels destroyed 11 trawlers destroyed ~10,000,000 kg of military hardware lost

The Anti-arms smuggling operations conducted by the Sri Lanka Navy between September 2006 and October 2007 involved six successful interceptions in the Indian Ocean of rogue merchant ships transporting arms and ammunition to the LTTE.

With the onset of the Eelam War IV, the Sri Lanka Navy began intercepting LTTE arms shipments to Sri Lanka. The navy destroyed 11 LTTE trawlers carrying artillery shells, mortar bombs, and other military hardware to the south of Mannar. Intelligence from these operations revealed that the weapons were being sourced from cargo vessels in Indonesian waters, approximately 3,000 kilometres from Sri Lanka. To address this, the navy targeted these vessels, which served as floating armouries, rather than just intercepting the trawlers carrying smaller quantities of military hardware.

After nearly a year of intelligence gathering and planning, the navy launched a deep-sea operation in 2007. Initial attempts were unsuccessful, but detailed analysis led to a breakthrough on 28 February 2007 when the first LTTE floating armoury was detected approximately 360 km south of Sri Lanka and subsequently destroyed. Two more ships were located and sunk on 18 March 2007, 1,400 km southeast of Sri Lanka near Indonesia. Another three vessels were destroyed on 10 and 11 September 2007, within 24 hours, 3,000 km southeast of Sri Lanka near Australia. The final ship was located and destroyed on 7 October 2007, 2,900 km from Sri Lanka near Indonesia.

The navy claims to have destroyed close to 10 million kg of military hardware, including:

- 80,000 shells for 152 mm and 130 mm artillery
- Over 100,000 mortar bombs for 81 mm and 120 mm mortars
- Three disassembled aircraft
- Swimmer delivery vehicles
- Jet skis
- Diver delivery vehicles
- Diving scooters
- Torpedoes
- Explosives
- Electronics
- Various outboard motors used by Sea Tiger attack crafts
- Night vision equipment
- Radar

These losses dealt a significant setback to the LTTE in the ground war.
