= Nautical Institute =

- Abbreviation: NI
- Formation: 1971
- Type: Professional Body
- Headquarters: London, SE1; United Kingdom
- Members: 7,000
- Official language: English
- Website: http://www.nautinst.org

The Nautical Institute (NI) is an international professional organisation for maritime professionals, based in the United Kingdom. It was established in 1971 and has the status of a company limited by guarantee and is registered with the Charity Commission. It has over 7,000 members in over 110 countries. It publishes a members' newsletter "Seaways" and organizes meetings.

There are four levels of membership for qualified maritime professionals;

- Fellow (FNI)
- Associate Fellow (AFNI)
- Member (MNI)
- Associate Member (AMNI)
