= List of shipwrecks in 2006 =

The list of shipwrecks in 2006 includes ships sunk, foundered, grounded, or otherwise lost during 2006.

table of contents
2006
Jan	Feb	Mar	Apr
May	Jun	Jul	Aug
Sep	Oct	Nov	Dec
Unknown date

== January ==
=== 16 January ===
List of shipwrecks: 16 January 2006
Ship	State	Description
Horizon	United States	The 30-gross ton, 42-foot (12.8 m) longline fishing vessel sank in the Gulf of Alaska 12 nautical miles (22 km; 14 mi) southeast of Sitkalidak Island in Alaska′s Kodiak Archipelago. The fishing vessels Competition and Last One (both United States) rescued her crew of three. Her wreck was later seen washed up on the beach on the coast of Sitkalidak Island at Ocean Bay (57.0827778°N 153.1769444°W).

=== 28 January ===
List of shipwrecks: 28 January 2006
Ship	State	Description
Snug Harbor	United States	The retired 65-foot (19.8 m) fishing trawler was scuttled as an artificial reef in the North Atlantic Ocean 2 nautical miles (3.7 km; 2.3 mi) off Mantoloking, New Jersey, in 80 feet (24 m) of water at 40°03.452′N 073°59.985′W.

=== 31 January ===
List of shipwrecks: 31 January 2006
Ship	State	Description
Hermes II	United States	The 44.1-foot (13.4 m) fishing trawler sank in Table Bay (56°00′10″N 134°08′00″W) in Southeast Alaska 5 nautical miles (9.3 km; 5.8 mi) northeast of Cape Decision after a large wave struck her and damaged her hull. A United States Coast Guard helicopter rescued the only person aboard.

== February ==
=== 1 February ===
List of shipwrecks: 1 February 2006
Ship	State	Description
Ece	Marshall Islands	The tanker sank while under tow toward Le Havre, France, after colliding with the cargo ship General Grot-Rowecki (Malta) in the English Channel about 50 kilometres (27 nmi; 31 mi) northwest of Guernsey. Ece sank near the site of the collision, in 70 metres (230 ft) of water, 90 kilometres (49 nmi; 56 mi) west of Cap de La Hague, France.

=== 2 February ===
List of shipwrecks: 1 February 2006
Ship	State	Description
Fjordbuen	Norway	The cargo ship sank at the quay at Stamnes, Norway. The wreck has since become a popular diving site.

=== 3 February ===
List of shipwrecks: 3 February 2006
Ship	State	Description
al-Salam Boccaccio 98	Egypt	The passenger ferry caught fire and sank in the Red Sea killing at least 846 people. A total of 426 people were rescued.

=== 9 February ===
List of shipwrecks: 9 February 2006
Ship	State	Description
USS O'Brien	United States Navy	The decommissioned Spruance-class destroyer was sunk as a target in the Pacific Ocean off Kauai, Hawaii, by the guided-missile cruiser USS Lake Erie and two P-3 Orion aircraft (all United States Navy) and the frigate HMCS Vancouver (Canadian Forces Maritime Command).

=== 18 February ===
List of shipwrecks: 18 February 2006
Ship	State	Description
Impressive	United States	The 28-foot (8.5 m) dive boat sank at Bees Rocks (54°51′N 131°34′W) in Clarence Strait near Hassler Reef (54.8575°N 131.5888889°W) and Duke Island in the Gravina Islands of the Alexander Archipelago in Southeast Alaska after a wave broke over her stern and flooded her lazarette. The vessel Formula I (United States) rescued all three people aboard.

=== 23 February ===
List of shipwrecks: 23 February 2006
Ship	State	Description
Northern Dawn	United States	The 50-foot (15.2 m) crab-fishing vessel disappeared with the loss of both men on board in the Bering Sea near Cape Kovrizhka (53°50′40″N 167°09′00″W) on the northwest coast of Unalaska Island in the Aleutian Islands.

== March ==
=== 5 March ===
List of shipwrecks: 5 March 2006
Ship	State	Description
Runner 4	Dominica	Carrying aluminium, the cargo ship sank in the Gulf of Finland when the cargo ship Svyatitel Apostol Andrey (Russia) ran into her from behind while both were in a convoy escorted by the icebreaker Kapitan Sorokin (Russia).

=== 9 March ===
List of shipwrecks: 9 March 2006
Ship	State	Description
Teklivka	Malta	Cargo ship sunk in the Mediterranean near Port Said, Egypt in a storm. Three crew were lost, but the other 12 were rescued by Searose G.

=== 12 March ===
List of shipwrecks: 12 March 2006
Ship	State	Description
Slayer	United States	During a voyage from Kake to Sitka, Alaska, the 32-foot (9.8 m) troller sank after sending a distress signal 4.5 nautical miles (8.3 km; 5.2 mi) south of Point Gardner (57°01′N 134°37′W) in Southeast Alaska. Both men aboard her were lost.

=== 21 March ===
List of shipwrecks: 21 March 2006
Ship	State	Description
Hyundai Fortune	South Korea	The Hyundai Group container ship was damaged by fire in the Gulf of Aden near Yemen. She later was towed to port. She was repaired and returned to service.

=== 22 March ===
List of shipwrecks: 22 March 2006
Ship	State	Description
Queen of the North	Canada	Large passenger ferry which sank off the north coast of British Columbia, Canada after running aground. Two passengers drowned.

=== 23 March ===
List of shipwrecks: 23 March 2006
Ship	State	Description
Pong Su	Tuvalu	Confiscated by the Government of Australia after being seized for smuggling heroin in 2003, the formerly North Korea-owned cargo ship was sunk as a target by two GBU-10 Paveway II laser-guided bombs dropped by Royal Australian Air Force (RAAF) General Dynamics F-111C aircraft during a joint RAAF-Royal Australian Navy exercise off Australia.
Unidentified passenger boat	flag unknown	The passenger boat sank in the Atlantic Ocean off the coast of Cameroon near the port of Kribi with the loss of at least 127 lives.

=== 26 March ===
List of shipwrecks: 26 March 2006
Ship	State	Description
Orion	Mexico	The tanker sank in the Gulf of Mexico near Yucatán.

=== 30 March ===
List of shipwrecks: 30 March 2006
Ship	State	Description
Al-Dana	Bahrain	Passenger dhow which sank in the Persian Gulf near Bahrain.

== April ==
=== 27 April ===
List of shipwrecks: 27 April 2006
Ship	State	Description
HDMS SKA 11	Royal Danish Navy	The survey ship ran aground in the Arsuk Fjord, Greenland. Her crew were rescued by HDMS SKA 12 (Royal Danish Navy). HDMS SKA 11 sank on 3 May.

== May ==
=== 4 May ===
List of shipwrecks: 4 May 2006
Ship	State	Description
NRP Limpopo	Portuguese Navy	The decommissioned patrol vessel was sunk as a target in the Atlantic Ocean by three hits by RIM-7M Sea Sparrow missiles fired by the frigate NRP Vasco da Gama (Portuguese Navy) and the frigate German frigate Mecklenburg-Vorpommern (German Navy) and two hits by Standard SM-1 missiles fired by the frigate Canarias (Spanish Navy).

=== 6 May ===
List of shipwrecks: 6 May 2006
Ship	State	Description
Calico Dog	United States	The 10-gross ton, 32-foot (9.8 m) cod-fishing vessel capsized with the loss of one life off Priest Rock (54°00′32″N 166°22′30″W) near the entrance to Unalaska Bay on the coast of Unalaska Island in the Aleutian Islands after a series of large waves struck her. Her sole survivor clung to her overturned hull for 12 hours before the Alaska State Trooper vessel Stimpson (United States) rescued him. Calico Dog later was salvaged.

=== 12 May ===
List of shipwrecks: 12 May 2006
Ship	State	Description
Five unidentified boats	Sri Lanka Liberation Tigers of Tamil Eelam	Sri Lankan Civil War: Battle of Point Pedro: Sri Lanka Navy warships sank the boats – either explosive motorboats, assault boats, or a mix thereof – off Point Pedro, Sri Lanka. Between four and 30 people were killed.
SLNS P-418	Sri Lanka Navy	Sri Lankan Civil War: Battle of Point Pedro: The patrol boat was sunk by a Liberation Tigers of Tamil Eelam explosive motorboat off Point Pedro, Sri Lanka. 18 crewmen were killed.

=== 17 May ===
List of shipwrecks: 17 May 2006
Ship	State	Description
USS Oriskany	United States Navy	The decommissioned Essex-class aircraft carrier was sunk in the Gulf of Mexico off Florida to create an artificial reef.

=== 29 May ===
List of shipwrecks: 29 May 2006
Ship	State	Description
Nearchos	Hellenic Navy	The decommissioned Charles F. Adams-class guided missile destroyer was sunk as a target.

== June ==
=== 7 June ===
List of shipwrecks: 7 June 2006
Ship	State	Description
USS Comte de Grasse	United States Navy	The decommissioned Spruance-class destroyer was sunk as a target in the Atlantic Ocean about 275 nautical miles (509 km; 316 mi) off the coast of North Carolina.
USS Stump	United States Navy	The decommissioned Spruance-class destroyer was sunk as a target in the Atlantic Ocean off the coast of North Carolina.

=== 12 June ===
List of shipwrecks: 12 June 2006
Ship	State	Description
HDMS SKA 12	Royal Danish Navy	The survey ship ran aground off Maniitsoq, Greenland.. Subsequently refloated, repaired and returned to service

=== 26 June ===
List of shipwrecks: 12 June 2006
Ship	State	Description
Safmarine Agulhas	Liberia	The container ship ran aground near at sandbank in East London. Her crew members were rescued. The ship broke in two in August 2006 and later scrapped in October 2006.

== July ==
=== 7 July ===
List of shipwrecks: 7 July 2006
Ship	State	Description
Stella	United States	After her operator fell asleep at the helm, the 58-foot (18 m) seiner was wrecked on Gull Island (58°30′10″N 134°52′00″W) in Southeast Alaska near Juneau, Alaska. The Alaska Marine Highway motor ferry Taku (United States) rescued her entire crew of three from a life raft.

=== 13 July ===
List of shipwrecks: 13 July 2006
Ship	State	Description
USS Belleau Wood	United States Navy	USS Belleau Wood sinking. The decommissioned Tarawa-class amphibious assault ship was sunk as a target in the Pacific Ocean off Hawaii as part of the RIMPAC 06 exercise.

=== 15 July ===
List of shipwrecks: 15 July 2006
Ship	State	Description
USNS Mars	United States Navy	The inactivated Mars-class combat stores ship was sunk as a torpedo target in the Pacific Ocean 54 nautical miles (100 km; 62 mi) off the coast of Hawaii as part of the RIMPAC 06 exercise.

=== 18 July ===
List of shipwrecks: 18 July 2006
Ship	State	Description
Heavy Metal	United States	The retired 30-foot (9.1 m) tow boat was scuttled as an artificial reef in the North Atlantic Ocean off Townsends Inlet, New Jersey, at 39°06.306′N 074°36.471′W.

=== 22 July ===
List of shipwrecks: 22 July 2006
Ship	State	Description
USS Thorn	United States Navy	The decommissioned Spruance-class destroyer was sunk as a target.

=== 26 July ===
List of shipwrecks: 26 July 2006
Ship	State	Description
AC Wescoat 2	United States	The retired 60-foot (18.3 m) barge was scuttled as an artificial reef in the North Atlantic Ocean 4.5 nautical miles (8.3 km; 5.2 mi) off Ocean City, New Jersey, at 39°09.891′N 074°34.310′W.

=== Unknown date ===
List of shipwrecks: Unknown date July 2006
Ship	State	Description
ROCS Liao Yang	Republic of China Navy	The decommissioned Gearing-class guided missile destroyer was sunk as a target in the South China Sea.

== August ==
=== 1 August ===
List of shipwrecks: 1 August 2006
Ship	State	Description
Natalia	United States	The 45-foot (13.7 m) salmon seiner was destroyed in Bristol Bay off the coast of Alaska 16 nautical miles (30 km; 18 mi) north of the Ugashik River by a stack fire that went out of control. Her crew of three escaped in a life raft and was rescued by the fishing vessel Belina (United States).

=== 3 August ===
List of shipwrecks: 3 August 2006
Ship	State	Description
Echo	United States	The 64-foot (19.5 m) fishing vessel sank in the Shelikof Strait outside Uyak Bay (57°48′N 154°04′W) on the coast of Alaska′s Kodiak Island after water coming over her bow flooded her through an open hatch cover. Her crew of three abandoned ship in a skiff and survived.

=== 11 August ===
List of shipwrecks: 11 August 2006
Ship	State	Description
Solar I	Philippines	Guimaras oil spill: The oil tanker sank off the coast off Guimaras province.

=== 12 August ===
List of shipwrecks: 12 August 2006
Ship	State	Description
Cominoland	Malta	The former Gozo ferry was scuttled in the Mediterranean Sea off Xatt l-Aħmar, Gozo as an artificial reef.
Karwela	Malta	The former Captain Morgan ferry boat was scuttled in the Mediterranean Sea off Xatt l-Aħmar, Gozo as an artificial reef.

=== 28 August ===
List of shipwrecks: 28 August 2006
Ship	State	Description
Prince William	United States	The 44-foot (13.4 m) seiner was wrecked on Applegate Rock (60°21′20″N 147°23′30″W) in Montague Strait on the south-central coast of Alaska. Her crew of five was rescued from a skiff by the fishing vessel Orion (United States).

== September ==
=== 6 September ===
List of shipwrecks: 6 September 2006
Ship	State	Description
China B	United States	The 46.2-foot (14.1 m) longline halibut-fishing vessel capsized and sank in the Bering Sea approximately 30 nautical miles (56 km; 35 mi) north of Saint Paul Island in less than five minutes after a series of large waves broke over her stern. The fishing vessel Golden Chalice (United States) rescued all five members of her crew from a life raft.

=== 17 September ===
List of shipwrecks: 17 September 2006
Ship	State	Description
Unnamed supply ship	Sri Lanka Liberation Tigers of Tamil Eelam	Sri Lankan Civil War: The Liberation Tigers of Tamil Eelam supply ship was sunk off Kalmunai by the Sri Lanka Navy.

== October ==
=== 3 October ===
List of shipwrecks: 3 October 2006
Ship	State	Description
Cleanwater 12	United States	The retired 178-foot (54.3 m) tanker barge was scuttled as an artificial reef in the North Atlantic Ocean 2 nautical miles (3.7 km; 2.3 mi) off Mantoloking, New Jersey, in 80 feet (24 m) of water at 40°03.689′N 073°59.165′W. Her wreck is known as "MRMTC 9."
Unidentified barge	United States	The retired 90-foot (27.4 m) barge was scuttled as an artificial reef in the North Atlantic Ocean 2 nautical miles (3.7 km; 2.3 mi) off Mantoloking, New Jersey, in 80 feet (24 m) of water at 40°03.387′N 073°59.386′W. Her wreck is known as "MRMTC 8."

=== 9 October ===
List of shipwrecks: 18 October 2006
Ship	State	Description
Five unidentified boats	Sri Lanka Liberation Tigers of Tamil Eelam	Sri Lankan Civil War: Attack on Galle Harbour: Sri Lanka Navy warships sank three of the explosive motorboats outside of Galle, Sri Lanka. Two more detonated on or near the submarine chaser SLNS Parakramabahu (Sri Lanka Navy).
SLNS Parakramabahu	Sri Lanka Navy	Sri Lankan Civil War: Attack on Galle Harbour: The submarine chaser was heavily damaged, or possibly sunk, by Liberation Tigers of Tamil Eelam explosive motorboats at Galle, Sri Lanka. The vessel was declared a total loss.

=== 10 October ===
List of shipwrecks: 10 October 2006
Ship	State	Description
Siritara Ocean Queen	flag unknown	The cruise ship capsized at Bangkok, Thailand due to river flooding. Nobody was on board the ship.

=== 19 October ===
List of shipwrecks: 19 October 2006
Ship	State	Description
Ocean Challenger	United States	The 50-foot (15.2 m) fishing vessel capsized in bad weather in the North Pacific Ocean approximately 60 nautical miles (110 km; 69 mi) south of Sand Point, Alaska. Three of her four crewmen were lost.

=== 24 October ===
List of shipwrecks: 24 October 2006
Ship	State	Description
Rokia Delmas	Sweden	The ro-ro ship ran aground off La Rochelle, Charente-Maritime, France. She was declared a total loss and scrapped in situ.

== November ==
=== 1 November ===
List of shipwrecks: 1 November 2006
Ship	State	Description
Finnbirch	Sweden	The ro-ro ferry capsized and sank off the coast of Sweden with the loss of two crew.

=== 2 November ===
List of shipwrecks: 2 November 2006
Ship	State	Description
USS Valley Forge	United States Navy	The decommissioned Ticonderoga-class guided missile cruiser was sunk as a target in the Pacific Ocean near Kauai, Hawaii.

=== 4 November ===
List of shipwrecks: 4 November 2006
Ship	State	Description
Hail Mary II	United States	The retired 65-foot (19.8 m), 79-gross register ton fishing trawler was scuttled as an artificial reef in the North Atlantic Ocean 2 nautical miles (3.7 km; 2.3 mi) off Mantoloking, New Jersey, at 40°02.641′N 073°59.218′W.

=== 8 November ===
List of shipwrecks: 8 November 2006
Ship	State	Description
Hoheweg	Germany	The 26.6-metre (87 ft 3 in) fishing vessel sank of Weser River, Germany (53°55′N 08°02′E) with the loss of all four crew. The wreck was raised and scrapped.

=== 28 November ===
List of shipwrecks: 28 November 2006
Ship	State	Description
Unidentified barge	United States	The retired 40-foot (12.2 m) barge was scuttled as an artificial reef in the North Atlantic Ocean 3.1 nautical miles (5.7 km; 3.6 mi) off Barnegat, New Jersey, at 39°45.078′N 074°01.146′W.
Unidentified barge	United States	The retired 40-foot (12.2 m) barge was scuttled as an artificial reef in the North Atlantic Ocean 3.1 nautical miles (5.7 km; 3.6 mi) off Barnegat, New Jersey, at 39°45.079′N 074°01.445′W.

== December ==
=== 8 December ===
List of shipwrecks: 8 December 2006
Ship	State	Description
USS Spruance	United States Navy	The decommissioned Spruance-class destroyer was sunk as a target by aircraft-launched Harpoon missiles.

=== 30 December ===
List of shipwrecks: 30 December 2006
Ship	State	Description
Senopati Nusantara	Indonesia	The ferry sank off Mandalika Island with over 500 people killed.

== Unknown date ==
List of shipwrecks: Unknown date 2006
Ship	State	Description
Ipiros	Hellenic Navy	The decommissioned Knox-class frigate was sunk as a target.
