= Battle of Point Pedro (2007) =

2007 battle of the Eelam War IV

- Part of Eelam War IV
Date	June 19, 2007
Location	Off Point Pedro, Indian Ocean
Result	Sri Lankan victory

Belligerents
Sri Lanka	Liberation Tigers of Tamil Eelam

Commanders and leaders
Admiral of the Fleet Wasantha Karannagoda	(Liberation Tigers of Tamil Eelam) Colonel Soosai

Units involved
Sri Lanka Armed Forces; Sri Lanka Navy; 4th Fast Attack Flotilla; Sri Lanka Air Force	Liberation Tigers of Tamil Eelam; Sea Tigers

Strength
Several patrol boats and helicopter gunships	24 patrol boats

Casualties and losses
None	40 killed (alleged); 9 patrol boats sunk (alleged)

The Battle of Point Pedro was fought on June 19, 2007 off Point Pedro during Eelam War IV, the final state of the Sri Lankan civil war. Several Sri Lankan Navy patrol boats were attacked by 24 patrol boats of the Liberation Tigers of Tamil Eelam's (LTTE) Sea Tigers, but with the help of Mil Mi-24 gunships of the Sri Lanka Air Force the attackers were driven off with the purported loss of 9 patrol boats and 40 LTTE members.

== Background ==
The Sea Tigers were the naval wing of the Liberation Tigers of Tamil Eelam (LTTE), who fought against the Sri Lankan government for an independent Tamil state until 2009. Both sides had fought multiple open water skirmishes over the duration of the war, the most notable clashes taking place in water corridor between Point Pedro and Trincomalee, as the Sea Tigers were in control of the city at one point in the war and used the route to conduct attacks on the Sri Lanka Navy, such as the bombing of SLNS Sooraya and SLNS Ranasuru.

A previous battle at Point Pedro took place when Sri Lankan patrol boats escorting a troopship with 700 men on it came under attack by LTTE patrol boats and a suicide vessel, aimed at sinking the troopship. The attack was eventually repelled through Lieutenant Commander Edirisinghe ramming the suicide craft with his Super Dvora Mk III-class patrol boat, destroying both vessels and causing the remaining LTTE ships to retreat.

== Battle ==
The battle began when the Sri Lanka Navy attempted to recover a patrol boat that had drifted out into LTTE-controlled waters. Fighting erupted when 24 Sea Tiger patrol boats ambushed the government forces as they reached the drifting boat. The Sri Lanka Navy repelled the attack through the help of Mil Mi-24 helicopter gunships of the Sri Lanka Air Force. The Sri Lankan government estimated LTTE losses at 40 men killed and nine patrol boats destroyed.

== Aftermath ==
The following year on 1 November 2008, Sri Lankan Chief Petty Officer K. G. Shantha was killed in action after he rammed his Arrow-class patrol boat against a LTTE suicide craft that had aimed to detonate when in proximity of a group of naval vessels off the shore of Point Pedro. Sri Lankan officials described Shantha's actions as successfully thwarting the attack, and he was posthumouslywas awarded the highest Sri Lankan military award, the Parama Weera Vibhushanaya. Disputing these claims, the LTTE claimed to have successfully sunk two Sri Lankan warships.
