= Battle of Mullaitivu (1997) =

Naval battle

Battle off the coast of Mullaitivu
- Part of Eelam War III and the Sri Lankan Civil War
Date	23 March 1997
Location	20-30 nautical miles of Mullaitivu, Sri Lanka
Result	Sri Lanka Navy victory

Belligerents
Sri Lanka	Liberation Tigers of Tamil Eelam

Commanders and leaders
Vice Admiral Cecil Tissera; Commander Nawan Tennekoon	V. Prabhakaran; Colonel Soosai

Units involved
Sri Lanka Armed Forces; Sri Lanka Navy; SLNS Parakramabahu; SLNS Jagatha; SLNS Ranadheera; P 460; P 452; P 441; P 422; P 440; P 443	Liberation Tigers of Tamil Eelam; Sea Tigers

Strength
1 gun corvette, 2 fast gun boats and 6 fast attack craft	20 boats of various types

Casualties and losses
1 killed, 7 wounded (MoD claim)	7 boats sunk, 80–100 killed, 50–70 wounded (MoD claim) 8 boats sunk, 30 confirmed killed

The Battle off the coast of Mullaitivu was a naval battle fought between the Sri Lanka Navy and Sea Tigers on 23 March 1997, off the coast of town of Mullaitivu which has been under control of the LTTE since the Battle of Mullaitivu in 1996.

== Prelude ==
The LTTE had developed its Sea Tiger arm with suicide units called "Black Sea Tigers" on the lines of their Black Tigers equipped with small high speed crafts packed with explosives that would be rammed into their targets. This tactic had been used with devastating effect during the Battle of Mullaitivu in July 1996, in which the Sri Lankan Navy fast gun board SLNS Ranaviru was sunk off the cost of Mullaitivu by two suicide crafts. Since then, using the naval radars seized from Mullaitivu and Nagathevanthurai (in November 1993) the LTTE had been tracking and attacking naval traffic between Trincomalee and Jaffna, which had been the key life line to the Sri Lankan military located in Jaffna.

To reduce the risk LTTE attacks, the navy began sailing troop transports and cargo vessels under naval convoy further out to sea, with the expectation that the smaller LTTE crafts will not operate in the high seas. On 19 March, while providing close air support for naval units engaged with Sea Tiger crafts off the coast of Trincomalee, a Sri Lanka Air Force (SLAF) Mil Mi-24 helicopter gunship went missing. Following this incident the SLAF had grounded its fleet as fears of sabotage was rife.

== Battle ==
On the 22 March 1997, the flagship of the navy SLNS Parakramabahu a Type 037 corvette sailed into the Trincomalee harbour from Galle. SLNS Parakramabahu was under the command of Commander Nawan Tennekoon and was leading a flotilla that was now forming east of the Trincomalee harbour under the overall command of the Eastern Naval Command Headquarters. SLNS Parakramabahu was joined by the Type 062 fast gun boats, SLNS Jagatha, commanded by Lt. Commander C.H. Liyanage and SLNS Ranadheera, commanded by Lt. Commander S. Rozairo having sailed out of the inner harbour, along with the Dvora fast attack craft P 460, P 452, P 441 and P 422. Their mission was to sail north and await instructions from Commander, Northern Naval Area (Comnorth), Rear Admiral Daya Sandagiri. The flotilla set sail at 6 PM on an easterly course to reach the high seas and then changed direction to sail north cruising 20 nautical miles from shore.

Around 1:30 AM on 23 March, larger units of the flotilla were off the coast of Mullaitivu, when SLNS Jagatha radioed that it has spotted two groups of boats of four to five heading in their direction. The four Dvoras were some distance behind. The LTTE boats included radar equipped water jets it has captured from the navy, large boats the navy personnel called "the bus" and smaller suicide crafts crewed by two to three suicide cadre. SLNS Parakramabahu engaged the attacking group with its two 37 mm guns and the two 14.5 mm guns and destroyed a suicide craft. One of its gun crew, Able Seaman G.A.K. Dimbulatenna was killed.

Having increased their speed Dvoras reached the battle, with the first Dvora reaching the area engaged the second group of Sea Tiger boats that had been heading towards to rear of the group of gunboats. One of the suicide crafts were destroyed and the other three Dvoras engaged in the ensuing sea battle. The gunboats headed to sea, giving more room for the faster Dvoras to maneuver. The next two hours saw a moving sea battle that shifted from 20 nautical miles to 30 nautical miles off shore. With the gunboats bring their larger gun armaments' to bare with that of Dvoras, Sea Tiger boats were hit by naval gun fire and some began to sick. Soon Sea Tiger boats began to withdraw towards Mullaitivu with their wounded and survivors that they had picked up from the sea, while other boats withdraw re-grouped and returned continue the battle. By this time the navy had also sustained casualties with seven naval personnel wounded and requiring medical treatment. On receiving a radio signal from SLNS Parakramabahu, Comnorth dispatched two Dvoras P 440 and P 443 for casualty evacuation. These were intercepted by two groups of four to five Sea Tiger boats. One Dvora able to sink of these boats while to other Dvoras successfully carried out the casualty evacuation. By 3:30 AM, the Sri Lanka Navy had gained a decisive edge. One navy Dvora had been hit by gun fire and lost engine control. The remaining Dvora chased the Sea Tiger boats as they withdrew to the Mullaitivu coast to within 3 miles of the coast. The sea tiger boats unloaded their dead and wounded along the Mullaitivu coast. While the wounded were transported inland on tractors for treatment, the boats were berthed and moved inland for concealment. Apart from the Dvora that was disabled by enemy action, one developed engine trouble and all had sustained battle damage to some extent. The naval flotilla of three gunboats and six Dvoras returned to SLN Dockyard by 11AM.

== Aftermath ==
Ministry of Defence, claimed that 80 to 100 Sea Tigers had been killed and 50 to 70 wounded, while LTTE radio communications indicated 30 carders killed and eight boats sunk. The following day P 440 and P 443 returned north to Jaffna accompanied by SLNS Parakramabahu. Navy suspected that the LTTE spotters from Kattaiparichchan to Foul Point had observed the convoy leaving in Trincomalee as it was the first convoy in eight weeks. According to journalist Iqbal Athas, in the past, the OP HQ of the MOD is known to give high enemy casualties. In fact, if the figures were added together, it would exceed LTTE strength and represent a sizable portion of the Jaffna peninsula's population. For the entire duration of the Eelam War.

== See also ==
- SLNS Ranaviru
