= 1996 attack on Colombo Harbour =

Suicide attack in Sri Lanka

Coordinates: 6.940°N 79.846°E

Attack on Colombo Harbour
- Part of the Sri Lankan civil war
Date	12 April 1996
Location	Colombo, Sri Lanka
Result	Sri Lanka Navy victory

Belligerents
Sri Lanka Navy	Liberation Tigers of Tamil Eelam

Commanders and leaders
L.R.N.A. Wijetunga	Unknown

Strength
1 fast attack craft, 1 inshore patrol craft, 2 small patrol boats	6 in 1 suicide craft

Casualties and losses
4 merchant ships damage (according to the Sri Lankan media); 3 Fast Attack Craft and 3 supply vessels destroyed (according to the LTTE)	1 boat exploded, 6 Black Tigers killed (according to the SL Military)

On 12 April 1996 a suicide attack was carried out by six Sea Tigers of the Liberation Tigers of Tamil Eelam (LTTE) on Colombo Harbour, which is the primary commercial port in Sri Lanka.

== Background ==
The LTTE ended a short-lived Norwegian-backed peace negotiation when frogmen of its Black Sea Tigers unit carried out a raid on the SLN Dockyard on 19 April 1995 sinking SLNS Sooraya and SLNS Ranasuru that set off Eelam War III. In the days that followed, the LTTE shot down two Sri Lanka Air Force (SLAF) Avro 748 transports over SLAF Palaly by SA-7 MANPADS acquired from the Mujahedeen resulting in the deaths of over 100 service personal in a few days. Responding government of President Chandrika Kumaratunga, moved to suppress the LTTE by capturing the Jaffna Peninsula from the Operation Riviresa in December 1995. Having lost Jaffna, the LTTE withdrew to jungles of the Vanni region. On 30 March 1996, the Dvora fast attack craft P-458 was destroyed when it intercepted and struck an LTTE suicide craft attacking a navy troop transport off the coast of Northern Sri Lanka, its commanding officer Lieutenant Jude Wijethunge was posthumously awarded the Parama Weera Vibhushanaya, the highest medal for gallantry in Sri Lanka.

== Prelude ==
After months of reconnaissance by LTTE intelligence wing, the LTTE carried out a raid on the 12 April 1996, when the country was celebrating the Sinhalese New Year. The night before, the 7:40 pm the Command Operations Room of the Western Naval Area of SLNS Ranagala received an anonymous call stating that a merchant ship outside the Colombo harbour was being boarded by sea pirates. The call was received by the duty officer, who alerted the duty staff officer (DSO) (West) and deployed two inshore patrol craft (IPC) to the two entrances to the Colombo harbour suspecting a possible LTTE infiltration. The Sri Lanka cargo ship MV Lanka Asitha was expected arrive with a cargo of four IAI Kfir jet fighters for the SLAF to be unloaded at the Jaya Container Terminal, along with MV Mercs Hendala with a military cargo for unloading at the Bandaranaike quay. The Sri Lanka Navy's Landing Ship Tank, SLNS Shakthi was being loaded at the Rangala pier number 1 with military cargo, while another ship was unloading LP gas near the guide pier. By dawn, one of the IPCs had withdrawn.

== The attack ==
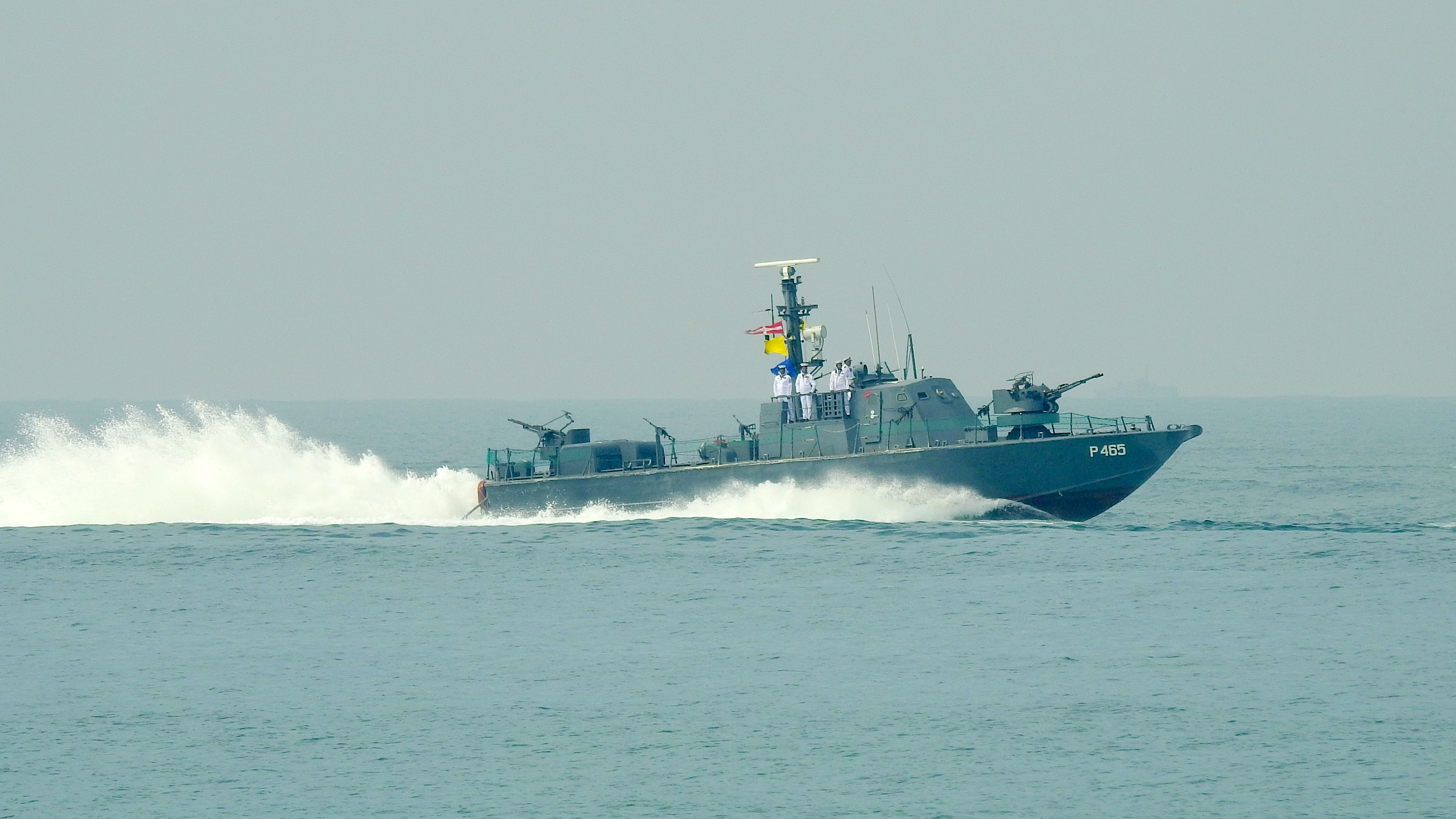
SLN fast attack craft

At 5:45 am a naval sentry at the pilot station detected underwater movement and called it in. The Sri Lanka Ports Authority later claimed that two of its boatmen had made the initial detection off the Jaya Container Terminal Stage One. At this time, none of the senior officers of SLNS Rangala: Commodore H.R. Amaraweera, Commander Western Naval Area; Captain S.P.F. Wijeratne, Deputy Area Commander; Commanding Officer, SLNS Rangala and Executive Officer, SLNS Rangala were available, leaving Lieutenant Commander L.R.N.A. Wijetunga, DSO West the senior most officer. As the alert was received at the Command Operations Room at SLNS Ranagala, the duty officer at the Operations Room, Lieutenant Siriwardhana, ordered two small patrol craft to proceed to investigate and notified the DSO. One of the patrol craft confirmed the presence of a frogman to the Operations Room and engaged him with explosives. As the underwater threat was eliminated, the naval sentry at the radar point reported an unauthorised boat was attempting to enter the harbour. Siriwardhana ordered the two small patrol craft to intercept, even though only one of the craft had a main armament. As the two boats and the sentry engaged the unauthorised boat, the Black Sea Tigers fired rocket-propelled grenades (RPGs). At this point the Dvora fast attack craft P-441 engaged the LTTE craft without direction from the Command Operations Room. P-441 of the Fast Attack Flotilla, had been moored at the Rangala pier and had been taken out under the command of Lieutenant D.K.P. Dassanayake, Staff Officer, Harbour Defence in the absence of its Commanding Officer Lieutenant Commander Manoj Jayasuriya with DSO West Lieutenant Commander Wijetunga who had come on board. A salvo from P-441 blew up the LTTE craft that the navy suspected to have been laden with high explosives and contained five persons.

== Aftermath ==
Following the raid the navy claimed six LTTE cadres were killed, including two frogmen, while several merchant ships were damaged by LTTE RPG fire, which included the oil tanker Arma moored at the North Pier, the car carrier Singha Ace moored at the Guide Pier, the Sea Land Endeavour docked at the Jaya Container Terminal 1 Pier and the Nedloyed Obridjan berthed the Queen Elisabeth Quay. The LTTE International Secretariat in London issued two statements on 13 April 1996 claiming that Black Sea Tigers had carried out the raid and had destroyed three fast attack craft and three supply vessels in Colombo harbour. Following the attack, the Sri Lankan government increased security around its harbours and banned fishing close to the harbour to prevent the LTTE from mingling with the fishing boats.

Following the attack, M. H. M. Ashraff, the Minister for Port and Shipping stated that newly installed sonar detected two LTTE frogmen entering the harbour around 5:45 am, sentries fired at the frogmen and dropped depth charges killing the two, followed by a fishing boat that entered the harbour firing machine guns and RPG. Ashraff stated that the port would return to normal operations that afternoon, however the attack highlighted the risk LTTE posed to the Sri Lankan economy. In January 1996, the LTTE Black Tigers carried out a suicide attack on the Central Bank in Colombo's business district killing 150 people and injuring thousands during the morning rush hour badly effecting tourism in Sri Lanka. Ravi Karunanayake, then managing director of Rotonvander Freighting said that the attack could result in increased insurance costs as the Colombo harbour would be perceived as a terrorism-prone port. In 1998, the navy awarded the Rana Wickrama Padakkama to Lieutenant Commander L.R.N.A. Wijetunga. In January 2007, the LTTE attempted another attack on the Colombo harbour with three boats.

== See also ==
- 2007 attack on Colombo Harbour
- Attack on Galle Harbour (2006)
