= Battle of Point Pedro =

Battle of Point Pedro may refer to:

- Battle of Point Pedro (2006)
- Battle of Point Pedro (2007)
