= 2007 attack on Colombo Harbour =

Suicide attack in Sri Lanka

Coordinates: 6.951°N 79.846°E

Attack on Colombo Harbour
- Part of the Sri Lankan civil war
Date	27 January 2007
Location	Colombo, Sri Lanka
Result	Sri Lanka Navy victory

Belligerents
Sri Lanka Navy	Liberation Tigers of Tamil Eelam

Commanders and leaders
Unknown	Unknown

Strength
	3 suicide craft

Casualties and losses
	3 boats exploded

On 27 January 2007 a suicide attack was carried out by three Sea Tiger suicide craft of the Liberation Tigers of Tamil Eelam (LTTE) on Colombo Harbour, which is the primary commercial port in Sri Lanka.

== See also ==
- 1996 attack on Colombo Harbour
- Attack on Galle Harbour
