= Polikandy =

Polikandy பொலிகண்டி පොලිකණ්ඩි
- Town
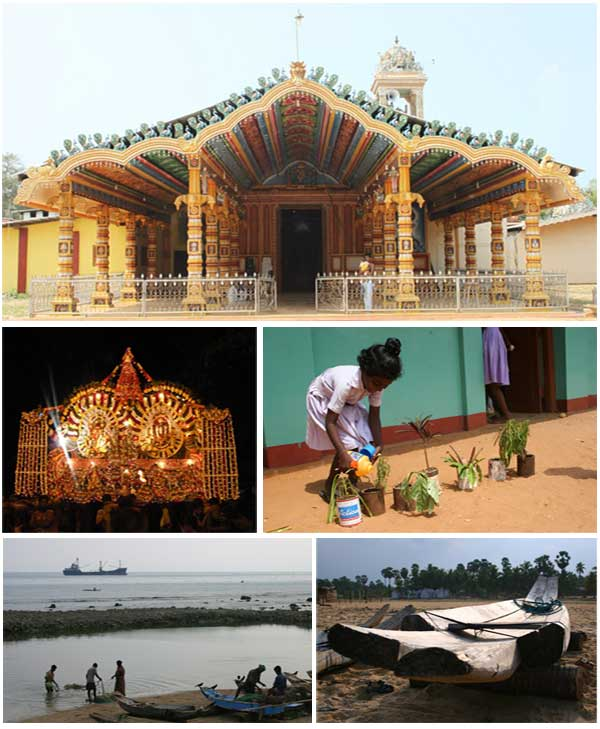
- Clockwise from top: Murugan/Kanthavanam Temple; Polikandy Hindu Tamil Mixed School; Kattumaram at PK beach: Polikandy fishing activity; Sri Pathira Kali Amman Temple

- Location within Northern Province
- Coordinates: 9°49′25″N 80°11′15″E
- Country: Sri Lanka
- Province: Northern
- District: Jaffna
- DS Division: Vadamarachchi North

Population
  - Total: 5,843
- Time zone: UTC+5:30 (Sri Lanka Standard Time Zone)

Polikandy is a town located in Jaffna District, Northern Province, Sri Lanka, governed by an Urban Council. Cities, towns. Places near Polikandy include Point Pedro (which is an extreme point of Sri Lanka), Valvettithurai, Karanavai and Karanavai North. Polikandy has three divisions: Polikandy East, Polikandy West and Polikandy South.

This legendary town is well known for being the birthplace of Thillaiyambalam Sivanesan Soosai, the Chief Commander of the Sea Tigers of the Liberation Tigers of Tamil Eelam or the Sea Tigers, a Tamil nationalist militant group that waged a war for independence in the North and East of Sri Lanka. This town is also the place of birth of the leaders of the Liberation Tigers of Tamil Eelam, Lieutenant Colonel David, Castro (Manivannan) and Kadaapi (Athavan). Polikandy was the first town to introduce the Sea Tigers.

This town of the Northern Province has seen many battles between the Sri Lankan Army vs. LTTE during the early 1990 till 2005, especially during the 1990s for a short period of time under the control of LTTE however under government control since 2005 where the Sri Lankan Army recaptured it from the LTTE.

Polikandy has various temples for gods of the Hindu pantheon, especially the one for the Murugan/ Kanthavanam temple, Sri Pathira Kaali Amman temple, Ilupai Mulai Pillayaar Temple, and Polikandy west Kulathady Vairavar/Bhairava temple. These are the four largest compared to the smaller temples in the vicinity. Most of the temples have a rich history of at least a century.

During the civil war, between 1990 and 1995, people from the Valikamam North area — including Palaly, Kankesanthurai, Myliddy, Tellippalai and Keerimalai have internally displaced to the shores of Polikandy whose livelihood was fishing.

Schools include the Polikandy Hindu Tamil Mixed School and American Mission Tamil Mixed School.

Primary industry is agriculture / farming and fishing.

== See also ==
- Jaffna Peninsula
- Extreme points of Sri Lanka
