= Galle Harbour =

Port of Galle
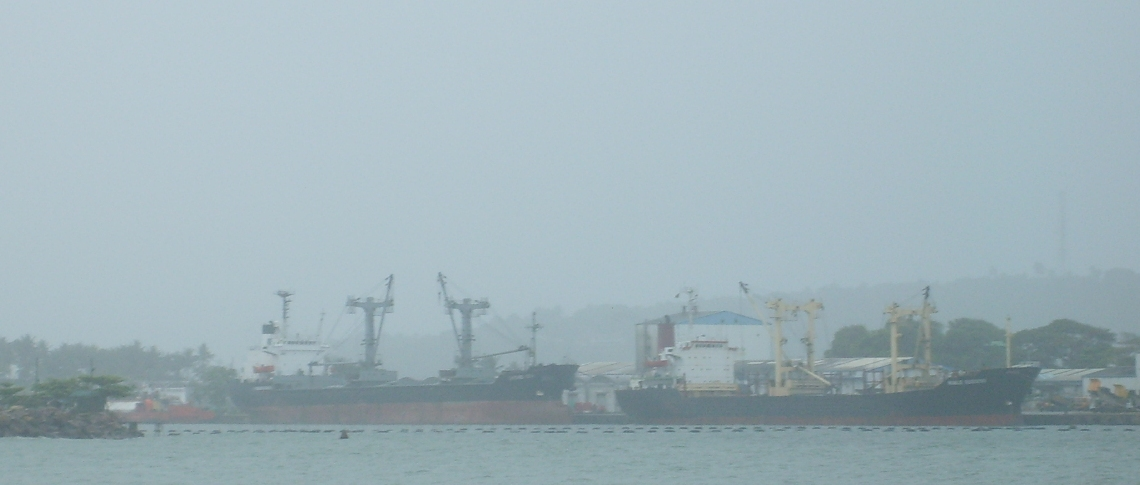
- Interactive map of Port of Galle

Location
- Country: Sri Lanka
- Location: Galle
- Coordinates: 06°02′08″N 80°12′54″E
- UN/LOCODE: LKGAL

Details
- Opened: Ancient
- Operated by: Sri Lanka Ports Authority
- Type of Harbor: Coastal breakwater
- Size: Small

Statistics
- Website http://www.slpa.lk/

Galle Harbour is a natural harbour, located in Galle, on the south-western coast of Sri Lanka. Currently Galle port serves as one of the most active regional ports in the country. It is also the only Sri Lankan port that provides facilities for pleasure yachts. International yacht societies have recognised Galle Harbour as one of the world's best attractions for yachting.

== History ==
Galle Harbour was a major harbour in the country, which was in use even during the pre-Christian times, and gained importance after the 12th century. By the 14th century, Galle Harbour was the most important harbour in Sri Lanka, and retained its importance until 1873 when an artificial harbour was built in Colombo.

Harbour of Galle Loan Act 1869 (Note: Section 1.)
- Act of Parliament
- Parliament of the United Kingdom
- Long title: An Act for empowering the Public Works Loan Commissioners to advance a sum not exceeding two hundred and fifty thousand pounds for the improvement of the harbour of Galle in the colony of Ceylon.
- Citation: 32 & 33 Vict. c. 105
- Territorial extent: United Kingdom

Dates
- Royal assent: 11 August 1869
- Commencement: 11 August 1869 (Note: The Acts of Parliament (Commencement) Act 1793.)
- Repealed: 30 June 1874
Other legislation
| Repealed by | Harbour of Colombo Loan Act 1874 |

Status: Repealed

Text of statute as originally enacted

After the construction of Galle Fort in the 17th century, Galle Port was a major port in the Indian Ocean for more than 200 years, which was an important anchorage for boats and ships traveling between Europe and Asia. When the British colonial government constructed breakwaters in Colombo Harbour in the late 19th century, much international marine traffic shifted to Colombo from Galle. Thereafter, Galle Port became a secondary port of the country, though it still handles some ships and boats.

Old harbour in 1867

== Development project ==
The Sri Lanka Ports Authority has planned to develop the existing Port of Galle to accommodate the increasing demand for freight handling for Sri Lanka as well as an international regional destination. This is planned with the construction of a deep water passenger vessel terminal and breakwaters, dredging of entrance channel and basin, and other facilities at the port of Galle to contribute to the economic development of the country.

Some of the facilities provided at Galle Port were damaged during the 2004 Indian Ocean tsunami. The proposed development also expects to provide a fully fledged yacht marina for the Galle Port to facilitate the calling yachts, as well as to attract more yachts.

SLPA expects to provide berthing facilities to passenger vessels of 300 m (980 ft) in length and cargo vessels of 200 m (660 ft) in length which have a depth of 10 m (33 ft) and 10.9 m (36 ft) respectively with this project. This will be achieved by constructing breakwaters to cover the effects of waves in the Galle bay area.

== Maritime archaeology ==
Galle Harbour is a popular site among the local and foreign maritime archaeologists who are doing research about the ancient naval transportation. Many ship wrecks during the colonial rule of Portuguese, Dutch and English can be seen in the sites around the bay of Galle situated near Galle Harbour. Notable ship wrecks in the area includes "The East Indiaman Avondster" (1659), the VOC shipwreck Hercules (1661), Dolfijn (1663), Barbesteijn (1735) and the Geinwens (1776). The marine archaeologists of the Maritime Archaeology Unit (MAU) of Central Cultural Fund (CCF) established in Galle has been conducting many archaeological explorations in the Galle harbour area.

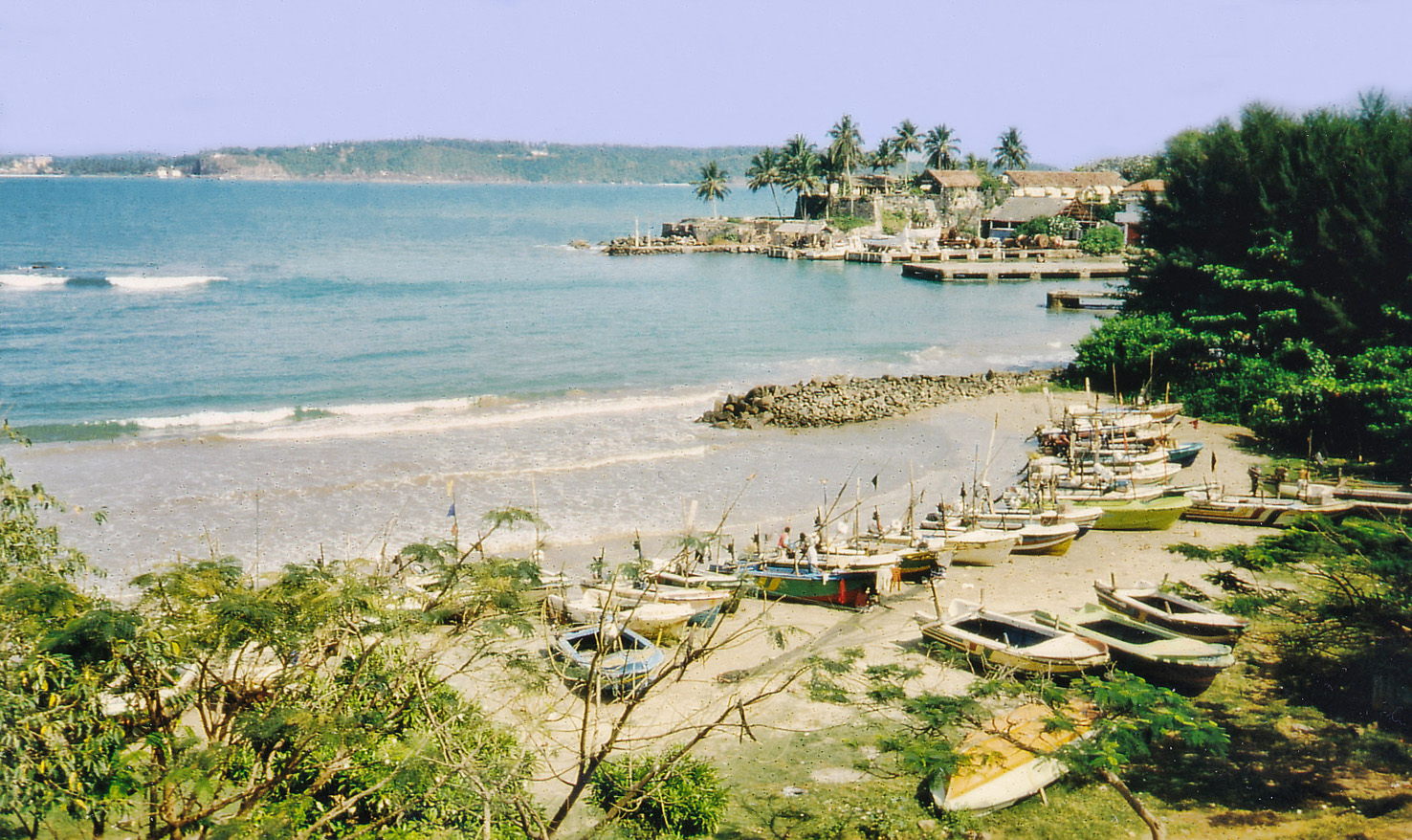
Old harbour of Galle

Sri Lanka's first underwater museum is also located at a depth of around 15 m (49 ft) in the Galle Harbour area providing a unique sightseeing experience for the marine archaeology enthusiasts. It was established by Sri Lanka Navy in June, 2020. The sculptures in this museum is expected to form an artificial coral reef over time, which would enhance the marine life of the Galle harbour area.

== See also ==
- Siege of Galle (1640)
- Attack on Galle Harbour
