= Violent non-state actors at sea =

Violent non-state actors at sea includes all violent non-state actors that engage in naval, amphibious or littoral violence or warfare.

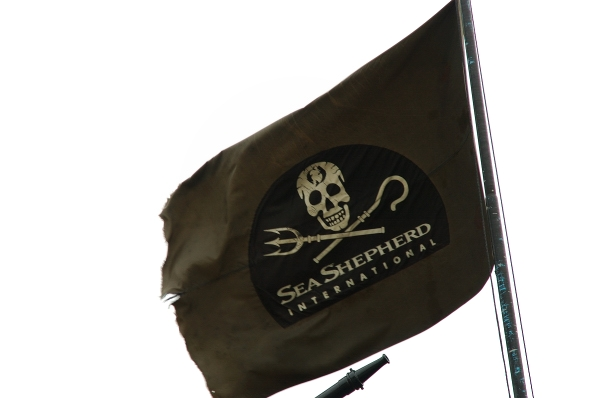
Sea Shepherds fleet of ships, Neptune's Navy, has a history of ramming whaling ships as a form of direct action

These include:

- Actual navies, such as the Sea Tigers, one of the most successful non-state navies in the 20th century;
- Other actors, such as pirates that play a navy-like role in place of a failed state, and
- Non-malicious actors such as Neptune's Navy. This is an example of a non-armed, violent non-state actor at sea, as they nevertheless have engaged in violence.

Both Neptune's Navy and pirates are also examples of non-state actors whose role is a matter of perspective. Neptune's Navy believe themselves to be environmentalist, while the ICRW and the Japanese government have labeled them terrorists. And pirates off the coast of Somalia claim to be "freedom fighters", defending Somali waters from pollution and foreign access.

== Terrorist non-state actors at sea ==
Some authors in maritime security point to the bombing of the USS Cole in 2000 as a pivotal moment of maritime terrorism. This bombing preceded the 9/11 attacks as an example of a direct malicious attack against a state by a non-state actor. The bombings also became crucial for private security companies: in the wake of the attack, Blackwater (now Academi) signed its first contract with US military. Terrorist non-state actors at sea have also been linked with pirates. NATO concluded in 2010 that terrorism could be linked with piracy and illegal fishing. This has been criticized however, by other authors, who believe a relation between pirates and terrorists brings no mutual benefits.

== Private military companies at sea ==
Actors such as Academi have been, or are in possession of, vessels such as the NOAAS McArthur, but most provide services that deliver armed personnel on board cargo ships. Some authors argue that because private security companies are composed largely of retired military personnel from industrialized/western countries, and because they also collaborate with the same countries, they are perceived as merely an extension tool for liberal governments to get involved in conflicts, or at the very least, they function on a basis of legitimacy borrowed from their partnered countries. This might imply that while they are technically non-state actors, they benefit from being perceived as directly related to a state.

== See also ==
- Privateer
