= MV Farah III =

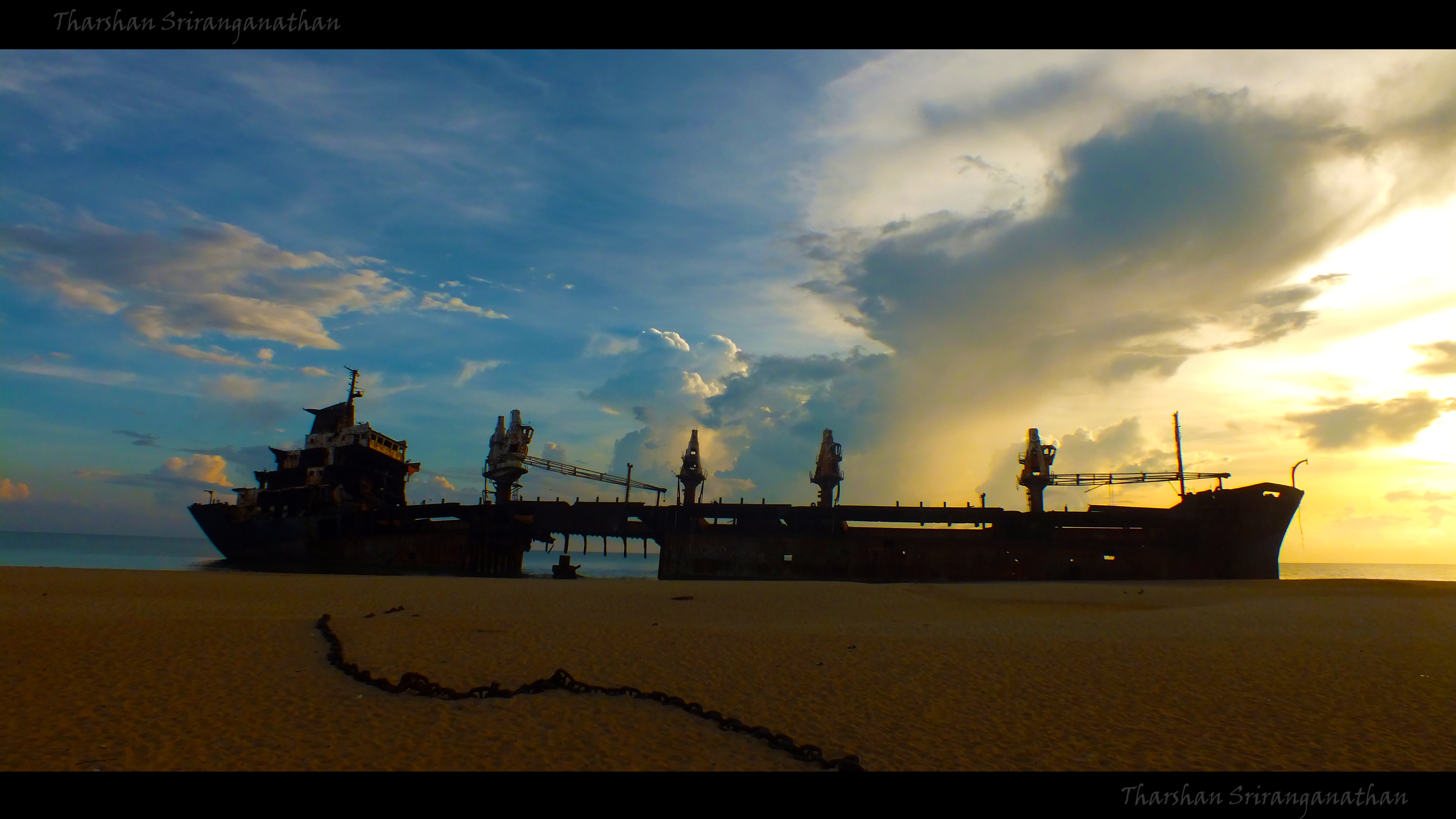
- Farah-3 3 May 2013

History

Jordan
- Name: Farah III (2004-2006); Kawkab (1997-2004); Zerva (1995-1997); Zervos (1990-1995); Renoir (1988-1990); Anny Pateras (1987-1988); Arao (1981-1987)
- Owner: Salam International Transport & Trading Co
- Port of registry: Jordan
- Builder: Navantia Carenas Ferrol, Ferrol, Spain
- Completed: 1981
- Identification: IMO number: 7602390; Call sign: JYA17
- Captured: December 2006
- Fate: Ran aground 09°18′52″N 80°47′29″E

General characteristics
- Type: General cargo ship
- Tonnage: 9,123 GT; 14,827 DWT
- Length: 149.33 m (489 ft 11 in)
- Depth: 12.40 m (40 ft 8 in)

MV Farah III was a general cargo ship built in 1981. She was registered in Jordan and owned by Salam International Transport & Trading Co.

== Fate ==
In December 2006, Farah III was en route from India to South Africa with a cargo of rice when she suffered engine trouble off the east coast of Sri Lanka. The crew sent out a distress signal and dropped anchor near the town of Mullaitivu, an area held by the militant rebel faction Liberation Tigers of Tamil Eelam (LTTE). On December 23, the ship was boarded by members of LTTE's naval wing, the Sea Tigers. According to the crew, the rebels ordered them to raise the anchor, after trying and failing to blow up the anchor cable, then forced them into smaller boats. The Tigers later denied this account, insisting that were only helping the crew, who were delivered safely to the Red Cross. However, the drifting ship subsequently ran aground, and its owner, Salam International, reported some months later that the Farah III had been stripped bare by the LTTE; not only had 14,000 metric tons of rice been taken, but also equipment such as lights and generators. Salam International also reported that they had been unable to secure safe passage for the insurance company and surveyors to visit the ship.

== Capture by LTTE and rescue by the Sri Lanka Army ==
On May 14, 2009, just days before government forces declared victory over the rebels and an end to the Sri Lankan Civil War, troops of the 58 Division captured the grounded ship, which was being used by the Sea Tigers as their operational centre.
