= Manil Mendis =

- Military career
- Allegiance: Sri Lanka
- Branch: Sri Lanka Navy
- Rank: Rear Admiral
- Commands: Director Naval Training, Commander Southern Naval Area
- Conflicts: Sri Lankan Civil War

Rear Admiral Manil Mendis was a Sri Lankan admiral. He is the former director of naval training and former commander of the Southern Naval Area. He was promoted to the rank of rear admiral in 2015, after a committee appointed by Maithripala Sirisena, the president of Sri Lanka found that he was politically victimized in 2010.

Educated at the Royal College Colombo, he joined the Sri Lanka Navy as an officer cadet in the executive branch, graduated top of his batch in officer training as a midshipman at the Naval & Maritime Academy, and completed his training at Britannia Royal Naval College after which he was commissioned as a sub-lieutenant. He thereafter complete the Sub Lieutenant Technical Course in the Indian Navy in 1982 and the Long Navigation & Direction Course in the Pakistan Navy in 1985. In 1992, he attended the Defence Services Staff College in Wellington, India gaining the psc qualification and a Masters in Defence Studies, from the University of Madras.

He held several postings that included Deputy Area Commander of South, North, West & East; Commandant, Naval & Maritime Academy; Director Naval Administration and Welfare and Flag Officer Commanding Naval Fleet. Reaching the rank of commodore, he was appointed to the post of director of naval training, after which he was appointed commander of the Southern Naval Area.

He was commander of the Southern Naval Area, when the LTTE launched a surprise suicide attack on Galle Harbour and the adjacent naval shore establishment SLNS Dakshina the Southern Naval Command HQ on October 18, 2006. It resulted in the death of one sailor and one civilian; 12 sailors, 14 civilians wounded and damage to three naval gun boats. However it caused much humiliation to the government as Galle was the provincial capital of the Southern Province, the home province of President Mahinda Rajapaksa. Relieved of command, Commodore Mendis was court-martialed three months later on January 28, 2007. He was the most senior military officer to be court-martialed since the start of the northern insurgency in 1981, even though there were several larger military setbacks in the past such as the Bandaranaike Airport attack, first Battle of Mullaitivu and Second Battle of Elephant Pass or after as the Raid on Anuradhapura Air Force Base no commanding officers were court-martialed, even though they resulted in more deaths and economic effects. In February 2007, he was found guilty of two counts. The first count was "failing to take adequate precautions and countermeasures with due care for the protection of the Naval base, ships and craft and personnel at the Galle Harbour from terrorist attacks despite the availability of prior reliable information and repeated instructions from Naval Headquarters, an act prejudicial to good order and naval discipline". The second count - "failing to obtain approval from the Navy Commander prior to leaving SLNS Dakshin despite specific instructions by the Commander for him to proceed and stay at SLNS Dakshin due to a possible terrorist attack on the Galle harbour, an act prejudicial to good order and naval discipline". He was reduced in seniority by ten months and retired shortly with his rank.

Commodore Mendis has been awarded the service medal Sri Lanka Armed Services Long Service Medal.

== See also ==
- Sri Lanka Navy
