= Attack on Galle Harbour =

Suicide attack in Sri Lanka

- Part of the Sri Lankan civil war
Date	18 October 2006
Location	Galle, Sri Lanka
Result	Disputed

Belligerents
Sri Lanka	Liberation Tigers of Tamil Eelam

Commanders and leaders
Commodore Manil Mendis	Unknown

Units involved
Sri Lanka Armed Forces; Sri Lanka Navy	Liberation Tigers of Tamil Eelam; Sea Tigers

Strength
Unknown	15 in 5 boats

Casualties and losses
3 Naval vessels damaged 1 sailor and 1 civilian killed, 12 sailors, 14 civilians wounded (according to the Sri Lanka Navy) 3 Naval gun boats destroyed (according to the South Asia Analysis Group)	5 boats (3 exploded), 9+ killed (according to the SL Military)

On 18 October 2006 a suicide attack was carried out by 15 Sea Tigers of the Liberation Tigers of Tamil Eelam (LTTE) on the commercial Galle Harbour and Sri Lanka Navy base SLNS Dakshina in the tourist town of Galle in southern Sri Lanka.

== Attack ==
The Navy claimed that at 7:45 a.m. on 18 October 2006, five "sea tiger" suicide boats, disguised as fishing boats, attempted to attack Dakshina; the Navy destroyed three, and the other two detonated at the entrance of Galle Harbour. One sailor was killed, eleven were injured, and another sailor was missing in action.

The pro-rebel TamilNet claimed that a 15-member team entered SLNS Dakshina in five vessels and attacked four Sri Lankan naval vessels and installations. At least three explosive-laden attack vessels attacked naval crafts, including a tsunami damaged sub chaser, SLNS Parakramabahu and destroyed a Fast Attack Craft and two water jet inshore patrol vessels anchored in the port base. However these have not been substantiated or excepted by the Sri Lankan defence ministry.

There were no Sea Tiger bases close by, so it was believed the attackers must have travelled a long distance to get to Galle. A number of the attackers died in the attack, whilst others escaped into the town, their fate was unknown despite the navy carrying out search operations.

The defence ministry said two people had been killed, one of them a sailor, with at least 26 others wounded, including civilians.

== Aftermath ==
The Sri Lankan government responded with airstrikes in rebel territory. Commodore Manil Mendis, commander of the Southern Naval Area, was court-martialled and found guilty of two counts of not taking adequate precautions and counter-measures relating to the incident.

== See also ==
- 1996 attack on Colombo Harbour
- 2007 attack on Colombo Harbour
