= SLNS Ranaviru =

Gunboat of the Sri Lankan Nav

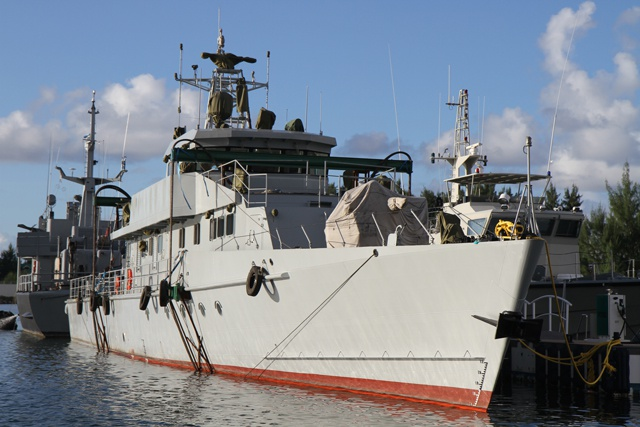
- A Type 062 gunboat similar to Ranaviru

History

Sri Lanka
- Commissioned: 1991
- Decommissioned: 1996
- Fate: Sunk

SLNS Ranaviru (Ranaviru, in Sinhalese: Warrior) was a Type 062 gunboat of the Sri Lanka Navy. Commissioned into the 3rd Fast Gun Boats Squadron in 1991, she was sunk by two Sea Tiger suicide crafts off the coast of Mullaitivu in 1996. On 19 July 1996, Ranaviru, under the command of Lieutenant Commander Parakrama Samaraweera, was dispatched to the seas off the coast of Mullaitivu where a Sri Lanka Army base was under siege as part of the Battle of Mullaitivu. She led the naval force that included Ranaviru, six Dvora-class fast patrol boats and the landing ship SLNS Shakthi, tasked with attempting an amphibious landing of a relief force to break the siege. Ranaviru was tasked with providing naval gun fire to cover the landing. Due to stiff resistance by coastal and sea units of the LTTE, the landing attempt was abandoned and landing ships began to withdraw.

Ranaviru began covering the withdrawal when it was hit by a Sea Tiger suicide craft which inflicted serious damage and disabled its propulsion. Samaraweera and the crew continued firing her guns and small arms until the disabled ship was hit by a second suicide craft resulting in a massive explosion that sank her. Of her crew of 36, only two survived to be rescued by other Sri Lanka Navy ships. Seven bodies were recovered amidst the sea battle. Samaraweera, last seen on the bridge firing a rifle, was listed as missing in action; his body was never recovered and presumed that he went down with his ship. He was posthumously awarded the Weera Wickrama Vibhushanaya for his gallantry and promoted to the rank of commander.

== See also ==
- Bombing of SLNS Sooraya and SLNS Ranasuru
- USS Cole bombing
- Battle of Mullaitivu (1997)
