= SLNS Parakramabahu (P351) =

Sri Lankan navy corvette class submarine chaser

History

Sri Lanka
- Builder: Quigdao SY
- Commissioned: 1996
- Status: Inactive

General characteristics
- Type: Submarine chaser
- Displacement: 478 tonnes (470 long tons)
- Length: 62.8 m
- Beam: 7.2 m
- Draught: 2.4 m
- Propulsion: 4 × Chinese PR 230ZC diesel engines, 4 shafts
- Speed: 28 knots (52 km/h; 32 mph)
- Complement: 71
- Sensors & processing systems: 1 × Type 723 surface search radar
- Electronic warfare & decoys: Chinese copy of French Thomson-Sintra medium frequency SS-12 VDS sonar.
- Armament: 4 × Type 76A 37 mm gun (2 × 2); 4 × Type 69 14.5 mm heavy machine guns (2 × 2); 1 × Type 87 6-tubed ASW mortar; additional armaments.
- Aircraft carried: none
- Aviation facilities: none

SLNS Parakramabahu (P351) was a Type 037 corvette class submarine chaser of the Sri Lanka Navy. The ship was named after King Parakramabahu I with warrior king of the ancient Sri Lankan Kingdom of Polonnaruwa. Purchased from the People's Liberation Army Navy, she served as the flagship of the fleet from 1996 to 2000.

== Operational history ==
Since joining the Sri Lankan fleet in 1996 with the objective of enhancing the blue water capability of the navy, she served as the flagship of the navy from 1996 to 2000, and was deployed for patrolling the coastal waters around Sri Lanka to counter gunrunning by the LTTE. Due to this she was attached to the 7th Surveillance Command Squadron. During the Sri Lankan Civil War, Parakramabahu was involved in anti arms smuggling patrols and maritime surveillance. During the war she was involved in several sea battles with the LTTE Sea Tigers, including the 1997 battle of the coast of Mullaitivu. However, its operations were greatly limited due to frequent breakdowns and the requirement of an escort of crafts from the Fast Attack Flotilla, and found itself spending much time in port and in non operational areas.

Since early 2000, it was based at SLNS Dakshina in Galle, without going to sea due to breakdowns and SLNS Sayura took over as the flagship in late 2000. She capsized and sank at her moorings at SLNS Dakshina when she was hit by the 2004 Indian Ocean tsunami. She was later re-floated by the Navy. She was damaged when the LTTE attacked SLNS Dakshina in 2006.
