= SLNS Parakramabahu =

Two ships operated by the Sri Lanka Navy have had the name SLNS Parakramabahu.

- SLNS Parakramabahu (P351), a Chinese-built Type 037 submarine chaser which was in service since 1996 and was damaged in 2006
- SLNS Parakramabahu (P625), a Chinese-built Type 053H2G frigate which was commissioned in 2019
