= Bombing of SLNS Sooraya and SLNS Ranasuru =

1995 suicide bomb attack in Sri Lanka

- Part of the Sri Lankan Civil War
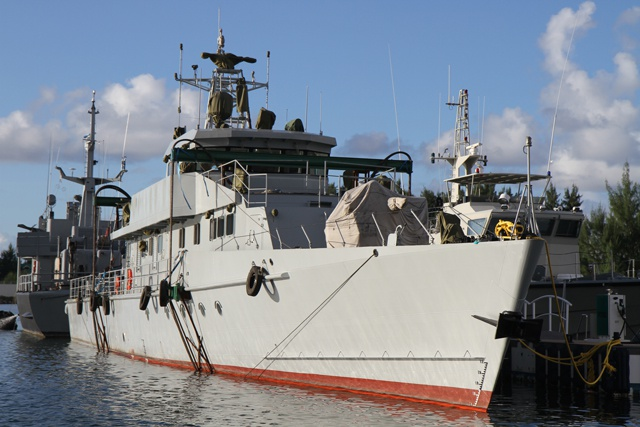
- Type 062 gunboat
- Type: Suicide attack
- Location: Trincomalee, Sri Lanka
- Planned by: LTTE
- Target: SLNS Sooraya and SLNS Ranasuru
- Date: 19 April 1995
- Executed by: Sea Tigers
- Casualties: 16 (plus four attackers) killed 21 injured

The bombing of SLNS Sooraya and SLNS Ranasuru was an attack carried out on 19 April 1995 by LTTE suicide frogmen of the Sea Tigers, who attacked and sank two Sri Lanka Navy gun boats moored in the harbor of Trincomalee, Sri Lanka by planting explosives on them.

The attack effectively ended the peace talks between the Government of Sri Lanka and the LTTE, resulting in the start of the Eelam War III, the third phase of the Sri Lankan Civil War.

== Background ==
In the 1994 parliamentary elections the ruling United National Party was defeated and the People's Alliance government was formed under the newly elected President Chandrika Kumaratunga. A cease-fire was agreed to on 8 January 1995 and peace talks between the government of Sri Lanka and the LTTE commenced. By April negotiations have failed and several incidents of violations had taken place. On 19 April 1995, LTTE leader Velupillai Prabhakaran sent a letter to the government announcing that the cease fire was effectively over.

President Kumaratunga immediately convened a meeting of her cabinet and armed forces island wide were placed on high alert.

== Attack ==
Hours after the armed forces were put on alert, a large explosion engulfed two Shanghai II class gun boats, SLNS Sooraya and SLNS Ranasuru of the 3rd Fast Gun Boats Squadron which were moored to at the gun boat pier of in the SLN Dockyard at the Trincomalee harbor.

Following the explosion both ships sank at their moorings. Frogmen of the LTTE Sea Tigers had penetrated the Trincomalee harbor, planted explosives on the two ships, and detonated them. Navy divers recovered bodies of 11 sailors and four Sea Tigers, which included two females. 22 naval personnel were wounded, with one later dying.

Most of the casualties were reported from Ranasuru. The objective of the attack was to disable the larger fleet units of the navy, thereby limiting its ability to effectively patrol the coastal waters around areas controlled by the LTTE, allowing them to smuggle arms and ammunition from the international waters of the Indian Ocean.

== Aftermath ==
The attack effectively ended all hopes of peace between the government and the LTTE, starting the third phase of the Sri Lankan Civil War. Kumaratunga's government launched major offensives in the Jaffna Peninsula, which included Operation Riviresa that recaptured the Jaffna Peninsula from the LTTE. The ships were later salvaged, but never repaired. The loss of two of its larger fleet units affected the navy's long range patrols and support of amphibious operations until replacement ships were purchased.

The navy enhanced its harbor defenses and also acquired a sub chaser SLNS Parakramabahu in 1996 suspecting LTTE use of submersibles.

== See also ==
- SLNS Ranaviru
- USS Cole bombing
