= General Grot-Rowecki =

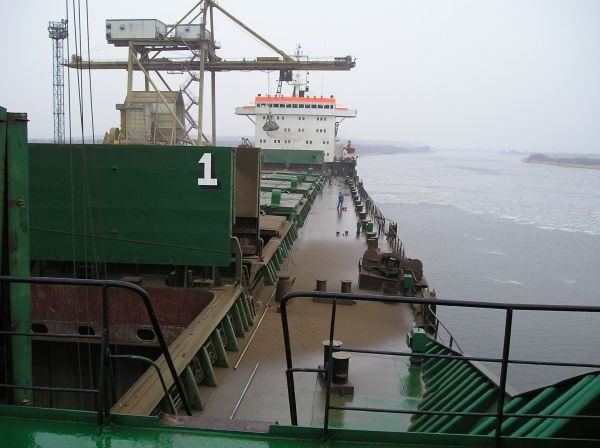
- General Grot-Rowecki

History
- Name: General Grot-Rowecki
- Namesake: Stefan Rowecki
- Operator: Polish Steamship Company
- Builder: Georgi Dimitrov Shipyard, Varna, Bulgaria
- Launched: 27 June 1985
- Identification: IMO number: 8417754; MMSI number: 207135000
- Fate: Scrapped 2013

General characteristics
- Type: Handymax bulk carrier
- Tonnage: 23,409 GT; 38,498 DWT
- Length: 199 m (652 ft 11 in)
- Beam: 28 m (91 ft 10 in)
- Draught: 11 m (36 ft 1 in)
- Propulsion: Sulzer engine, 7,943 kW (10,652 hp)
- Speed: 11 knots (20 km/h; 13 mph)
- Crew: 21

General Grot-Rowecki (IMO 8417754) was a 23,000-tonne, 198 metres (649 ft 7 in), freighter. Built in 1985, she was named after Stefan Grot-Rowecki, a Polish general in the Second World War. In 2010 she was renamed Baltic Star and was scrapped in 2013.

== Ship history ==
On 13 November 2005 the General Grot-Rowecki collided with the 20,700-tonne Swedish RO-RO passenger ferry MS Finnsailor while south-east of Gedser, Denmark, in the Baltic Sea. Both ships sustained damage and had to return to port for repairs.

On 31 January 2006 she collided with the French chemical tanker Ece in the English Channel. At the time of the collision, the General Grot-Rowecki was owned by the Polish Steamship Company and registered in Malta, and was en route to the port of Police, Poland, while the 8,131-tonne, 126 m (413 ft 5 in) Ece was bound for Ghent, Belgium. They collided approximately 30 miles (48 km) northwest of Guernsey. The General Grot-Rowecki was not seriously damaged, and its 21 crew members were unhurt. However, the collision led to the sinking of the Ece and the release of 10,000 tonnes of phosphoric acid into the Channel. The Ece's crew, numbering 22 members, was rescued by lifeboat and helicopter in a joint English and French operation.

In 2010 General Grot-Rowecki was renamed Baltic Star and registered in Bulgaria. She was scrapped on 23 July 2013.
