= Battle of Point Pedro (2006) =

2006 naval battle near Sri Lanka

- Part of the Sri Lankan Civil War
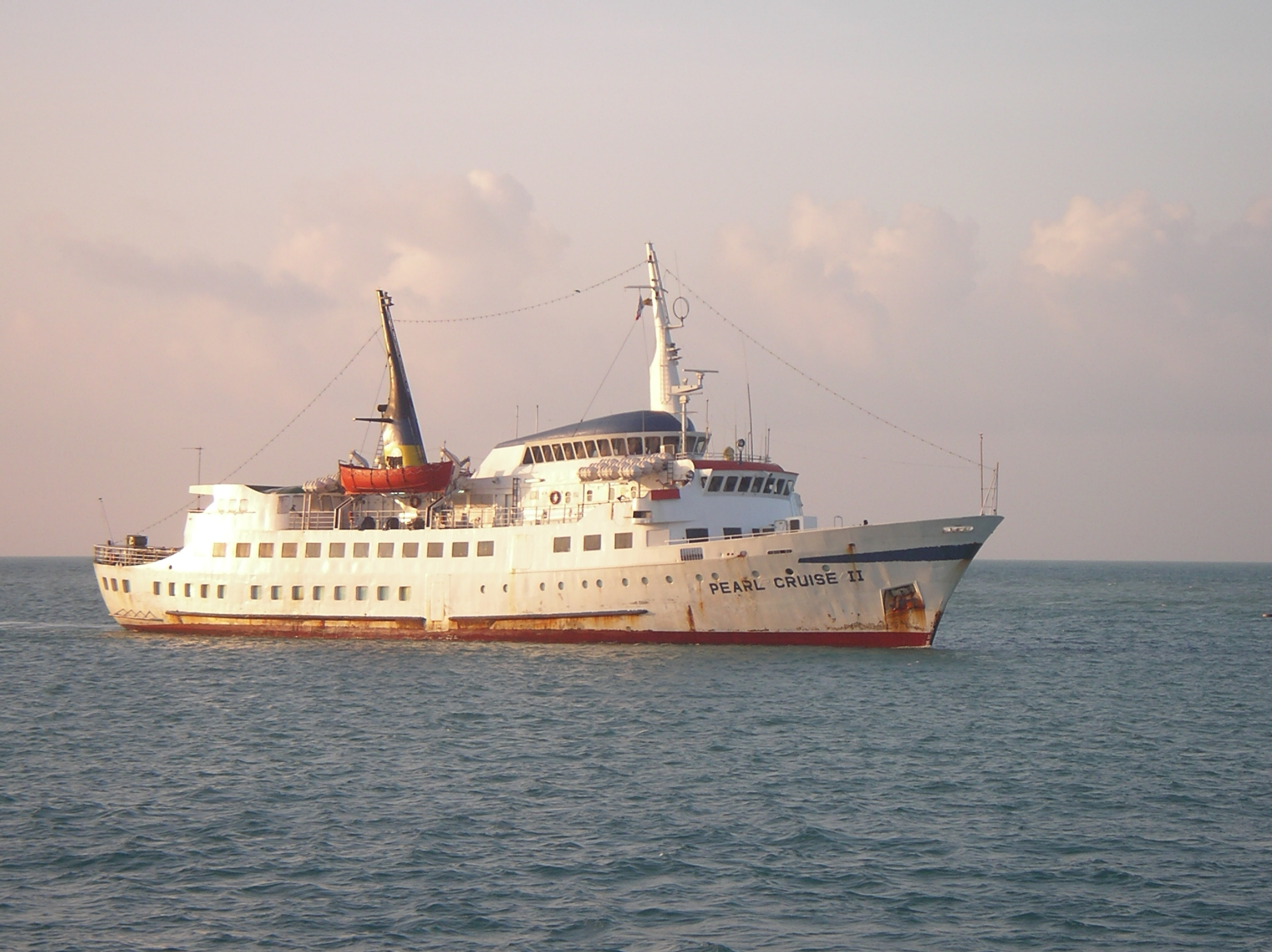
- The MV Pearl Cruise II was at the center of a sea battle between the SLN and the Sea Tigers in May 2006
Date	May 12, 2006
Location	off Point Pedro, Jaffna
Result	Sri Lankan Navy victory

Belligerents
Sri Lanka	Liberation Tigers of Tamil Eelam

Commanders and leaders
Admiral of the Fleet Wasantha Karannagoda; Lieutenant Commander Lalith Edirisinghe †	(Liberation Tigers of Tamil Eelam) Colonel Soosai

Units involved
Sri Lanka Armed Forces; Sri Lanka Navy	Liberation Tigers of Tamil Eelam; Sea Tigers

Strength
Several gun boats, one troop transport	15 boats

Casualties and losses
17 killed, 1 boat sunk	54 killed, 5 boats sunk

The Battle of Point Pedro was a naval battle that occurred on May 12, 2006 near Point Pedro, Jaffna, Sri Lanka. The Sri Lankan Navy was attacked by a group of Tamil Tiger boats. A group of SLN attack boats was escorting the troop transport MV Pearl Cruise II which was carrying 710 soldiers for the city of Jaffna which had been under siege for the previous six years.

About 15 Sea Tiger boats, including suicide boats, were engaged in the battle. One navy patrol boat, P-148, and five Tiger boats were sunk. P-148, under the command of Lieutenant Commander Lalith Edirisinghe spotted the incoming rebels and recognized the bullets his crew was firing, to be ricocheting off the suicide craft. Upon seeing no other way to stop the craft, Edirisinghe sped towards the LTTE suicide craft and rammed it, causing the explosion to destroy both vessels, protecting the transport. Lieutenant Commander Edirisinghe including 16 other sailors were killed in action, while the LTTE had reported 54 of their own killed. Following the failed explosion, the LTTE boats retreated, repelling the attack .
