= Soosai =

Sri Lankan naval militant leader

Colonel Soosai
- சூசை
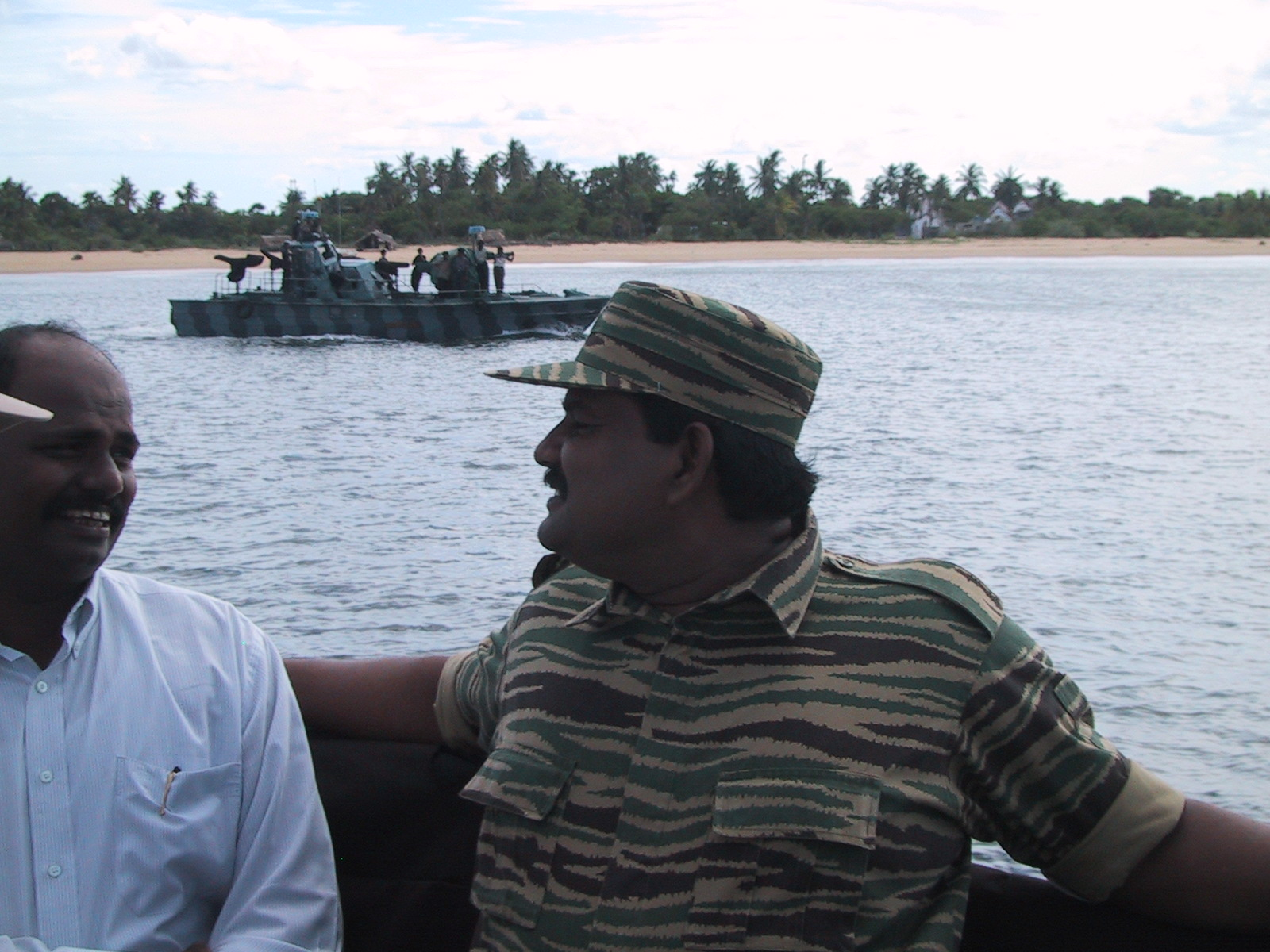
- The Sea Tigers special commander Col. Soosai.
- Born: Thillaiyampalam Sivanesan; 16 October 1963; Polikandy, Ceylon
- Died: 18 May 2009 (aged 45); Mullaitivu, Sri Lanka
- Spouse: Sathyadevi
- Children: Suresh; Madhi
- Military service
- Allegiance: Tamil Eelam
- Branch: Liberation Tigers of Tamil Eelam
- Service years: 1981 –2009
- Commands: Head of Sea Tigers
- Conflicts: Sri Lankan Civil War: Eelam War I, between 1983 and 1987; Indian intervention in the Sri Lankan Civil War, between 1987 and 1990; Eelam War II, between 1990 and 1995; Eelam War III, between 1995 and 2002; Kudarappu Landing on 26 March 2000; Eelam War IV, between 2006 and 2009

Thillaiyampalam Sivanesan (Tamil: தில்லையம்பலம் சிவனேசன்; 16 October 1963 – 18 May 2009), also known by his nom de guerre, Colonel Soosai, was the head of the Sea Tigers, the naval wing of the Liberation Tigers of Tamil Eelam.

== Personal life ==
Thillaiyampalam Sivanesan was married to Sathyadevi, the younger sister of Lieutenant Shankar. They had three children named Sindhu, Madhi and Shankar. Shankar, their youngest child, was killed in a boating accident on July 18, 2007. Soosai did not spend much time with his family due to his duties as head of the Sea Tigers, but was very fond of his children. The family were big cricket fans and were supporters of Indian cricketer Sachin Tendulkar.

== Post-War Family Life ==
On 14 May 2009, Sathyadevi and her two children fled the warzone, boarding a boat in an attempt to escape to Tamil Nadu, in India. Soosai refused to escape with his family, wanting to die fighting for the LTTE. The family's boat was intercepted at sea by the Sri Lankan Navy as they attempted to flee. Satyadevi was identified as Soosai’s wife by a Sea Tiger who surrendered to the Navy. She was detained separately with her children and interrogated. The family was detained within the Navy camp premises in Trincomalee and subsequently released. They currently live in Trincomalee under certain government restrictions. Sathyadevi later gave an interview to “The Nation” English Weekly, published in Colombo, where she recounted some of her experiences during the war.

== Eelam War ==
Soosai joined the LTTE in 1981 after the Burning of the Jaffna Public Library. He was one of the LTTE's original 30 members. When the war broke out following the Black July pogrom, Soosai was among the first batch of Tiger recruits who received training in North India. He was then appointed area commander for Vadamarachchi under Jaffna District commander Colonel Kittu. He served in this position during the Sri Lankan Army's Vadamarachchi Operation and played a crucial role in countering it.

== See also ==
- Liberation Tigers of Tamil Eelam
- Sea Tigers
