= Sea Tigers =

Naval wing of the Tamil Tigers

- கடற்புலிகள்
- Active: 1984 - 18 May 2009
- Country: Tamil Eelam
- Branch: Liberation Tigers of Tamil Eelam
- Type: Non-state navy Underwater demolition
- Size: 500 - 1,000
- Mottos: கடலிலே காவியம் படைப்போம் (Tamil: Create History at Sea)
- Colors: Blue and White
- Anniversaries: 10 April(Regimental day)
- Engagements: Sri Lankan Civil War

Commanders
- Colonel of the Regiment: Colonel Soosai
- Notable commanders: Colonel Soosai †, Lt.Col Gangai Amaran†, Lt. Colonel Cheliyan †

The Sea Tigers (Tamil: கடற்புலிகள் Kaţaṛpulikaḷ) was the naval wing of the Liberation Tigers of Tamil Eelam (LTTE) during the Sri Lankan Civil War. It was founded in 1984. The Sea Tigers had a number of small but effective suicide bomber vessels. During its existence it had gained a reputation as a capable adversary for the Sri Lankan Navy. During the civil war, the Sea Tigers had sunk at least 29 Sri Lankan small inshore patrol boats, 20 Dvora-class fast patrol boats, 3 gunboats, 2 large surveillance command ships, and one freighter.

The Sea Tigers were led by Soosai, with their main base at Mullaitivu, on the north-eastern coast of Sri Lanka. Their last base was taken when the Sri Lanka Army captured Chalai in Mullaitivu in February 2009.

== Background ==
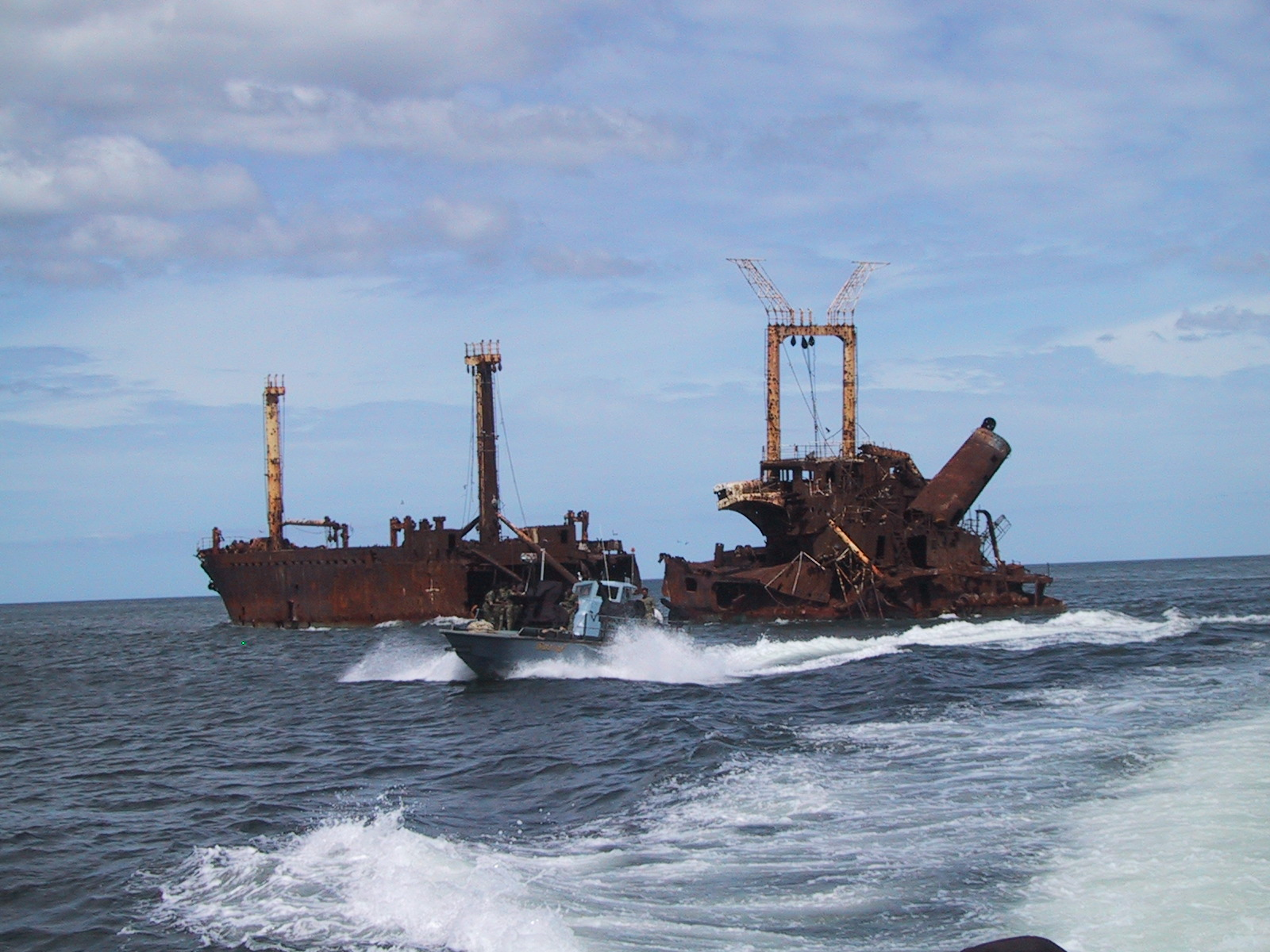
A LTTE Sea Tiger fast attack fiberglass boat passing a Sri Lankan freighter sunken by the Sea Tigers just north of the village of Mullaitivu, North-eastern Sri Lanka.

The LTTE was dominated by members with its leader Velupillai Prabhakaran being a Melongi Karaiyar. This caste were traditional fishermen living in the northern and eastern coastal areas of the island, with a strong traditional knowledge on seafaring and the waterways of the Palk Strait. Over the years members of this community had developed strong relations with other communities in the coastal regions of Tamil Nadu, engaging in the lucrative trade of smuggling contraband during the periods of import restrictions during poor economic period following Ceylon's independence from British rule in 1948.

In 1983, the Indian Research and Analysis Wing established training camps in Tamil Nadu to train and arm Tamil insurgents in Sri Lanka. The rebels found it easy to travel back to Sri Lanka from training camps and smuggled in their supplies from India via small crafts cross the Palk Strait. With the Sri Lanka Navy intercepting these crafts, Prabhakaran ordered the formation of maritime wing within the LTTE in 1984 tasked with smuggling personnel and equipment between the LTTE's bases in Tamil Nadu and Sri Lanka, in particular Jaffna. A year later these crafts crewed by LTTE cadres now known as Sea Tigers had been evading naval patrol crafts began mounting machine guns with which they began engaging the navy in gun battles at sea.

== Major operations ==
In 1994, Colonel Soosai who had been a deputy district commander was appointed by Prabhakaran as the head of the Sea Tigers. In 1994, the Sea Tigers were able to score notable victories when it sank the offshore patrol vessel of the navy SLNS Sagarawardena and captured its captain and sank the surveillance and command ship A 516 at Kankesanthurai. They broke the short lived ceasefire by the bombing of SLNS Sooraya and SLNS Ranasuru using frogmen and later sank the surveillance and command ship SLNS Edithara Kankesanthurai.

In August 1996, the Sea Tigers attacked a cargo vessel MV Princess Wave while it was loading Ilmenite from Pulmoddai, a traditional Tamil homeland. 9 local workers were wounded in the underwater bomb blast. That year, Sea Tigers took part in the Battle of Mullaitivu landing troops along the coast as part of the main attack and then preventing the navy from landing a relief force, sinking the SLNS Ranaviru in the process.

In May 1997, Sea Tigers badly damaged another cargo vessel by placing two to five kilograms of explosives on the hull (starboard or right side), below the water, just near the propeller. The vessel was a cargo vessel named Athena loaded with 42,000 metric tons of Argentinian wheat worth over Rs 570 million (ten million US dollars).

In 2001, the Sri Lankan Navy launched the Operation "Varuna Kirana", to stop LTTE sea tiger convoys from retrieving weapons and equipment from LTTE smuggling ships in the open seas. However, this was ultimately unsuccessful. The SLN units were spread out, and frequently found themselves outnumbered by LTTE convoys, with 10-15 vessels in each caravan pitted against SLN vessels operating in pairs. The sea tigers also benefitted from weak intelligence gathering by the navy and the poor communications between the navy and the air force.

During several of the LTTE offensive campaigns the Sea Tigers landed troops to engage and distract Sri Lankan Army units; the latest was when the LTTE attacked the Tamil Makkal Viduthalai Pulikal faction in the east in 2004. The most significant use of combined operations was at the Second Battle of Elephant Pass in the Spring of 2000, when some 1,200 cadres were landed behind enemy lines.

Sea Tigers' fast patrol boats and smaller suicide boats had engaged and sunk around 29 Sri Lanka Navy fast patrol boats. They also attacked the main SLN naval base in a suicide bomber vessel mission at Trincomalee and damaged one of the two SLN catamarans used as troop transports.

On October 20, 2006, the Sri Lankan Navy reported that it had sunk 2 boats, and damaged several others in a major skirmish which reportedly left at least 20 rebels killed in the naval battle but not confirmed by the Sea Tigers.

On November 1, 2008, a sea battle occurred between Sri Lankan navy and Sea Tigers. During the initial attack at about 05:45 seven Black Sea Tigers died, while four LTTE attack craft were destroyed, 14 Tamil Tigers were killed and about as many others were reported injured. The Sea Tigers then intercepted a twenty-vessel strong Sri Lankan Navy flotilla escorting a hovercraft that resulted in a heavy sea fight. According to pro-rebel sources, at about 7:00 After losing a Dvora Fast Attack Craft (FAC) and the hovercraft, the Lankan navy was forced to withdraw, and had to tow a water jet propelled naval craft that was severely damaged to the Kankesanturai (KKS) naval base. The battle followed reports that the Sri Lanka's air force had claimed to have bombed a base of the Sea Tiger chief, Soosai and captured a Sea Tiger base at Nachchikuda, along the north-western seaboard. The Sri Lanka Army launched heavy artillery barrages across the Northern Front following the sea battle. The attack also followed a dual Air Tiger air attack.

== Demise ==
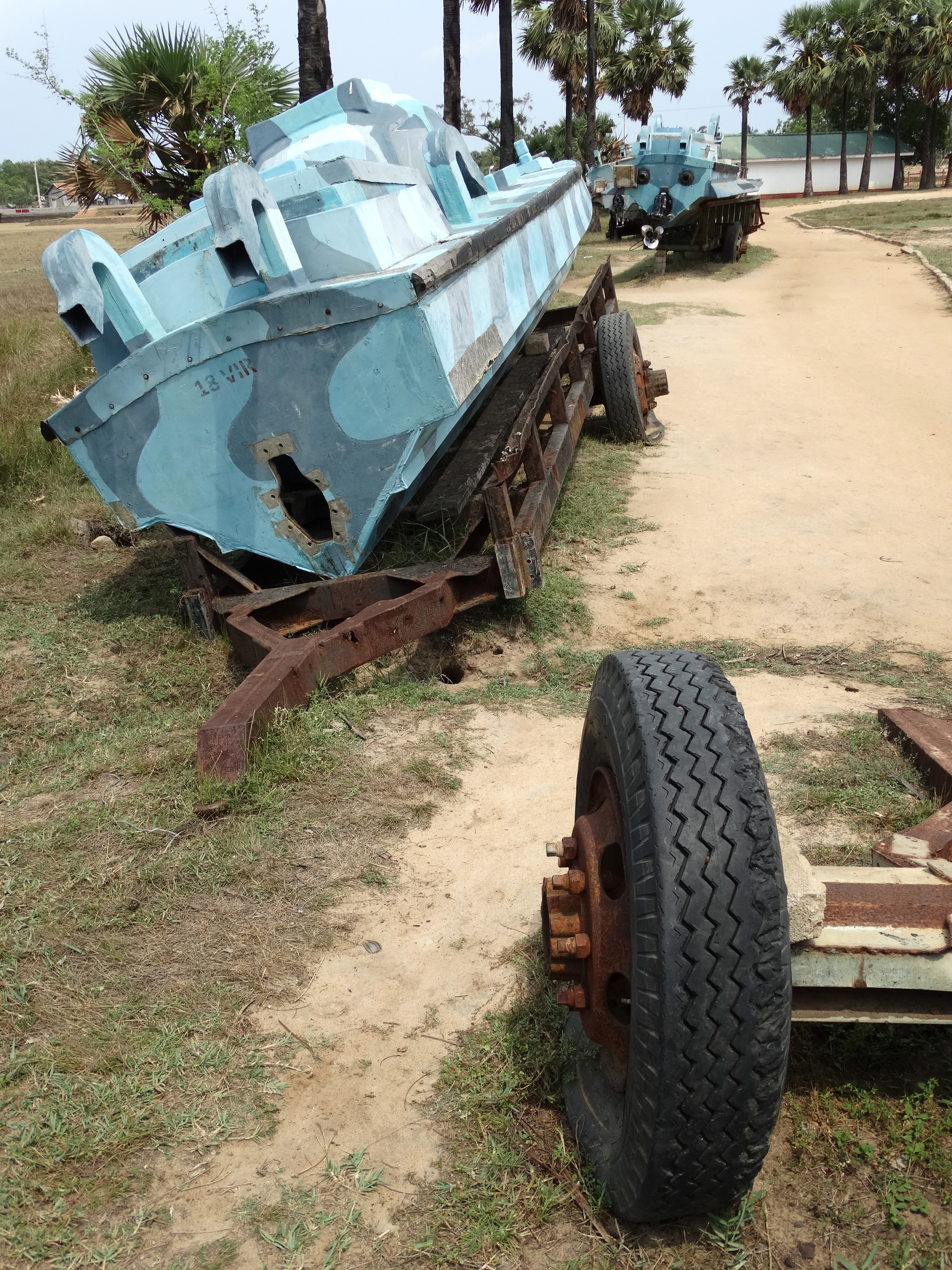
Sea Tigers boat on its trailer captured by Sri Lankan government forces.

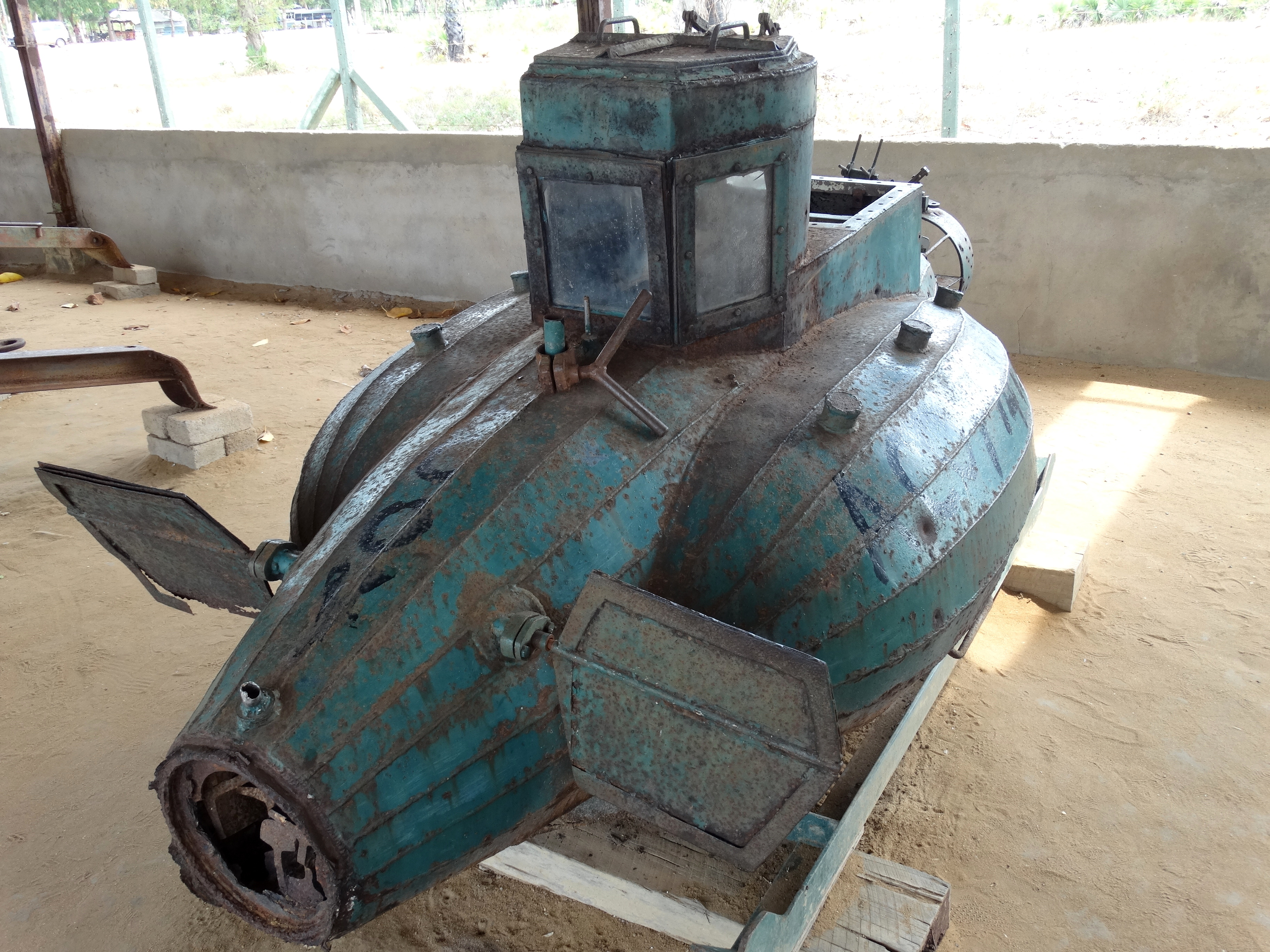
Sea Tigers Submersible captured by Sri Lankan government forces.

After 2005 the Sri Lankan Navy had undergone several major reforms and unlike in the past the navy received more political support. Thus with the beginning of the Fourth Eelam War the Sea Tigers faced a more organised enemy adapted to asymmetric warfare. Development of the navy's intelligence wing and centralizing intelligence agencies allowed the government to track LTTE smuggling ships and instead of attempting to stop convoys bringing weapons ashore the navy attacked smuggling ships. Initially stopping at 200 nautical miles to unload cargo to smaller boats, the LTTE was forced to carry out operations further away due to loss of ships and in 2007 SLN followed and sank them near Australian territory. During naval engagements the Sea tigers who relied on swarming and suicide boats found themselves outnumbered due to the introduction of the Arrow-class which was of higher quality. When the LTTE used the standard tactic of swarming larger patrol vessels the SLN would fall back while the confused Sea Tiger units were swarmed by arrow boats and outnumbered 10 to 40. The use of sonar alongside simpler methods such as booms as well as increased patrols around ports countered frogmen actions.

As a result of the military offensive that ended in May 2009, in the North of the country the Sri Lanka Armed Forces first recaptured all of the western seaboard that was once controlled by the LTTE, thus depriving the Sea Tigers of the bases it had in the west.

On the eastern seaboard the LTTE had also lost all of its Sea tigers bases and coast line it controlled including the headquarters of the Sea Tigers in the town of Mullaitivu.

Although the Sea Tigers were initially able to put up stout resistance during several major sea engagements that occurred in the early months of 2009 with the Sea tigers trying to penetrate the naval blockade maintained by the Sri Lanka Navy in the eastern seaboard, they have now been virtually eliminated as an organized naval force. On land the Sri Lanka Army has been able to capture several Sea Tiger boats and a boat yard including several partially completed submersibles.

In early February 2009, the military reported once again that it captured the last major Sea Tiger base killing three senior commanders in the process thus limiting Sea Tiger operational capabilities. As of 16 May 2009, the entire Sri Lankan coastline was captured by the Sri Lankan Armed Forces. Currently, the Sea Tigers are presumed to have been effectively and completely destroyed.

== Units ==
=== Boats ===
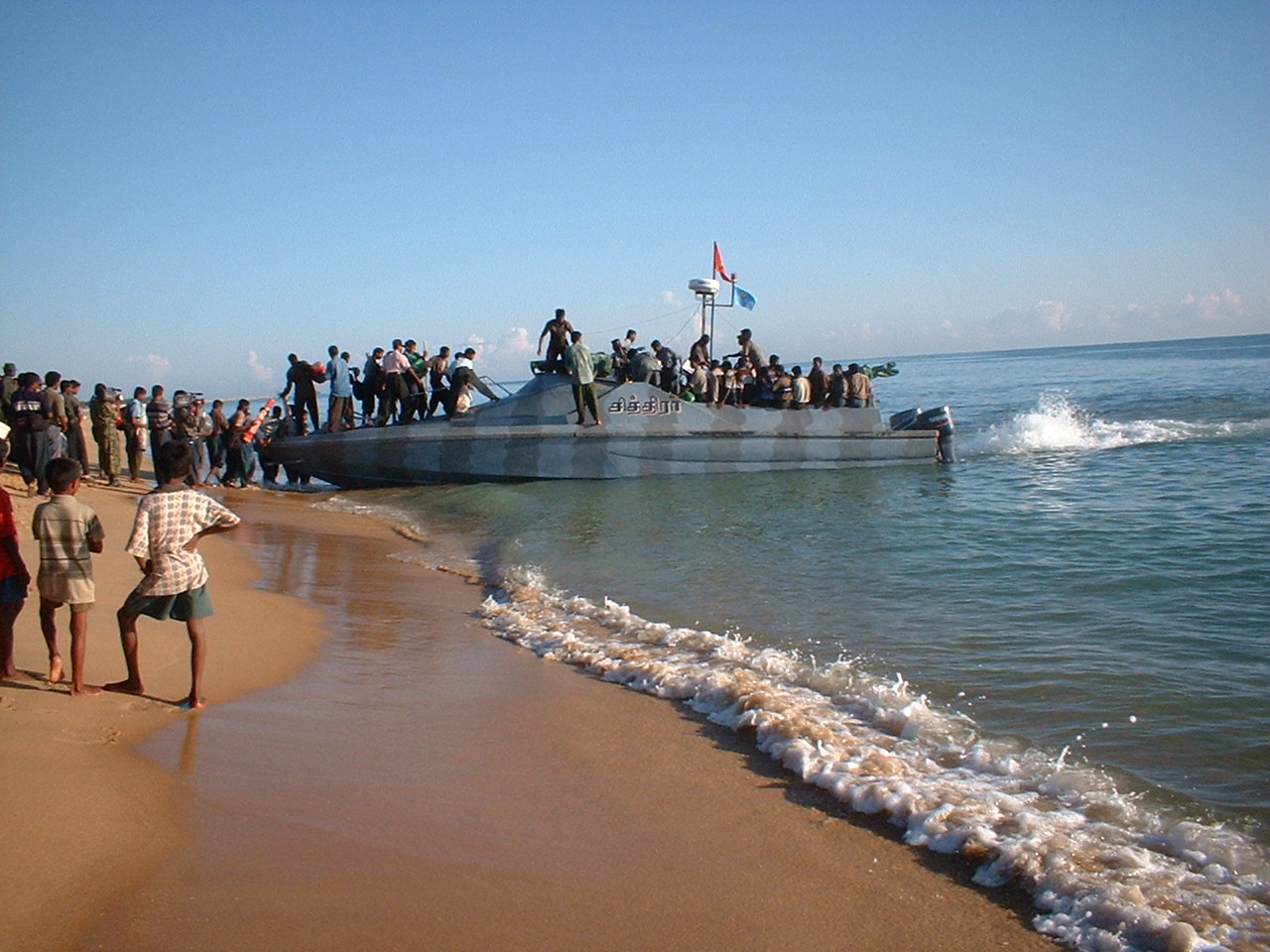
LTTE cadres embarking a Sea Tigers boat.

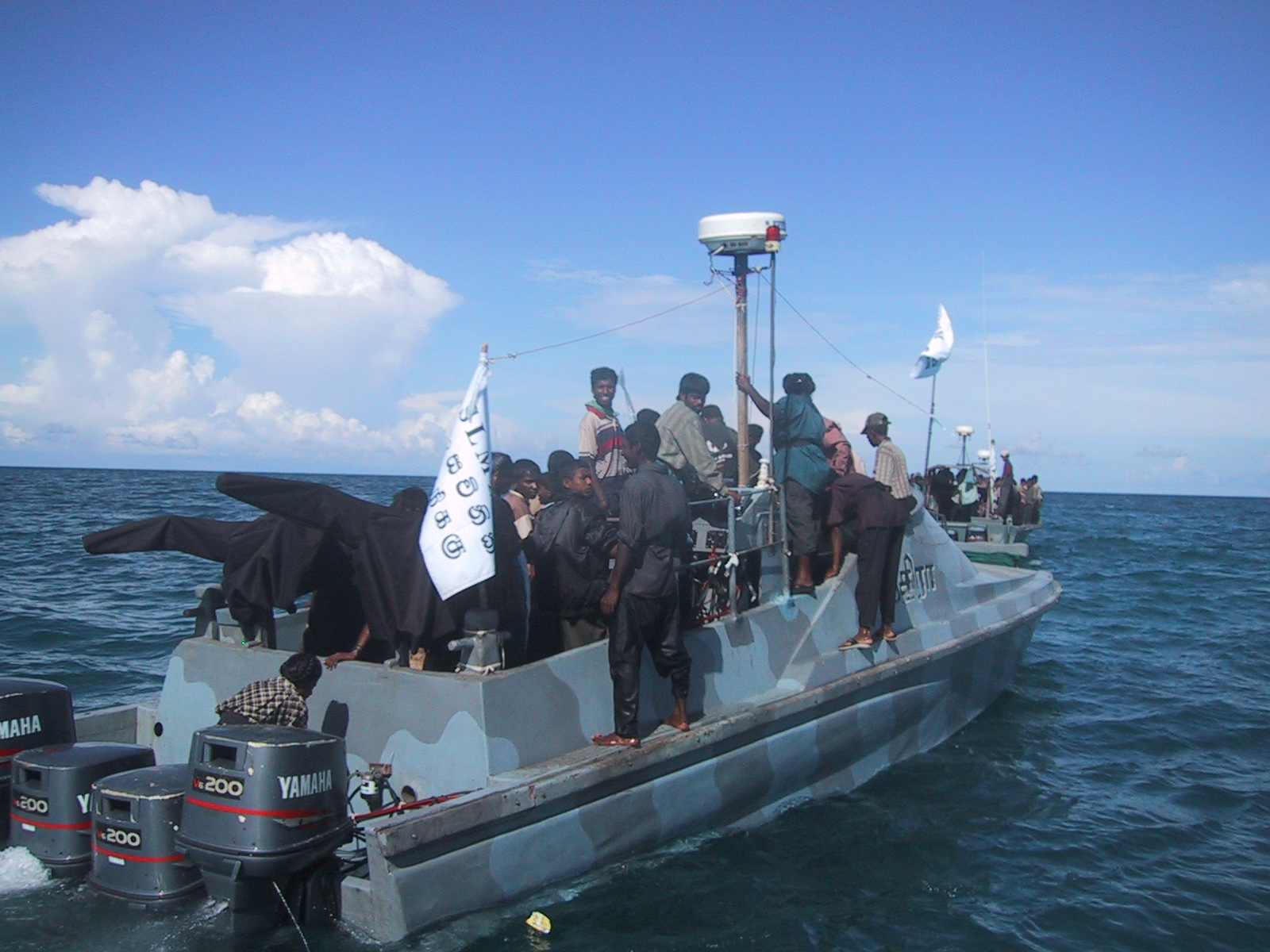
Sea Tigers boat with cease fire monitors onboard.

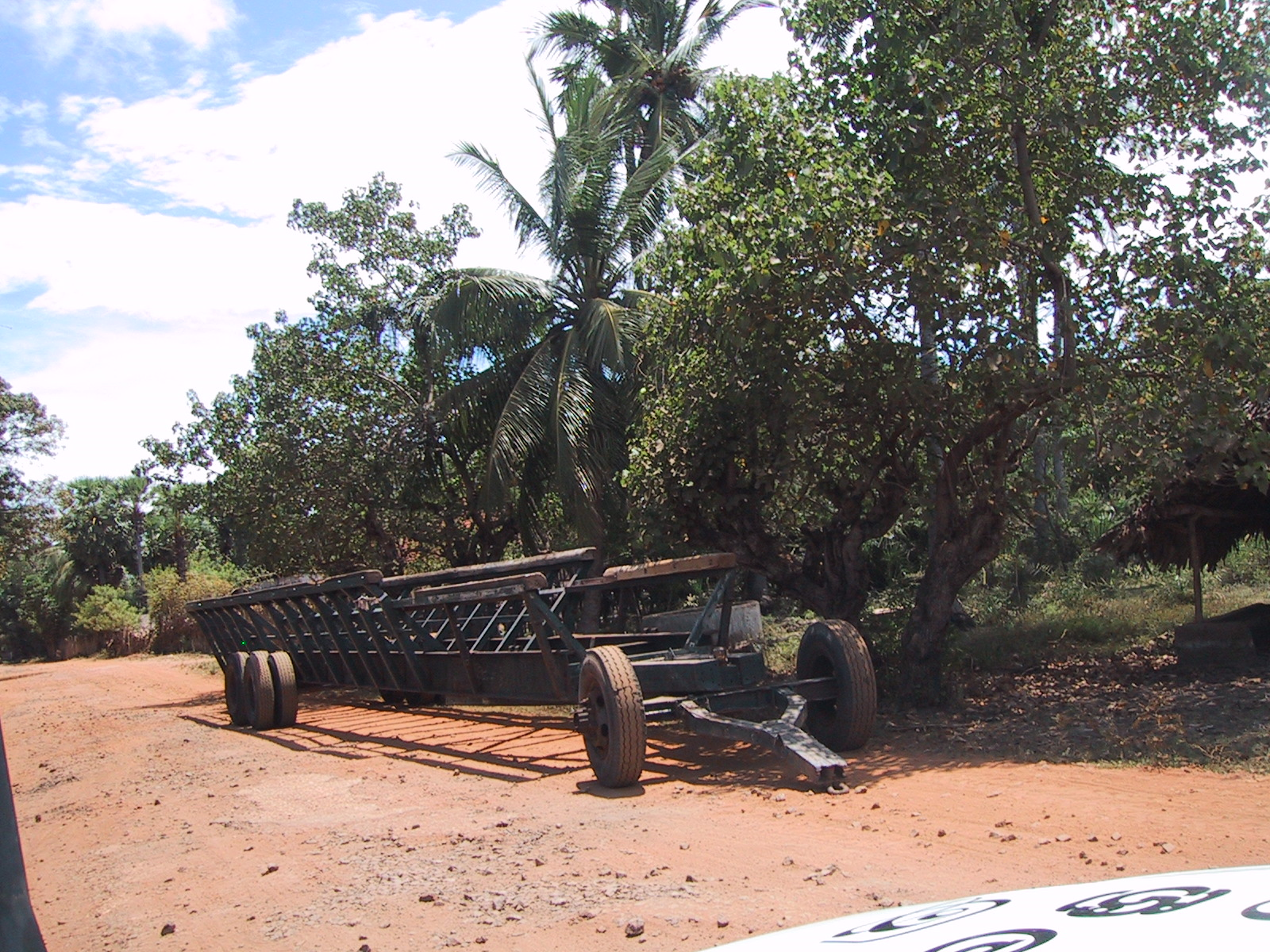
Trailer used by Sea Tigers move their boats inland to the cover of the jungle.

Boats used by the LTTE are divided into Gunboats, Explosive Boats and Low Profile Vessels. Boats designs ranged from those based on leisure to fishing craft. These boats could be up to 15 meters long, and were usually equipped with four to six 250 Hp outboard engines and a mixture of weaponry: light and heavy machine guns mainly of 12.7mm, 14.5mm calibers and grenade launchers. While inferior to the patrol craft of the Sri Lankan Navy, the use of swarm tactics together with suicide boats negated the disadvantage. The LTTE were also said to possess radar evading stealth boats which are believed to be from North Korea. While their radar evading capabilities have been questioned their low profile makes them harder to spot.

Light fibreglass boats were used for suicide bomber attacks, called the Idayan class. For every 20 Gunboats in a swarm there were 3 or 4 suicide craft which attempt to destroy or at least immobilize the larger vessels while gunboats distract them. The LTTE also manufactured several Low Profile Vessels which are slower than other boats but stealthier.

The Sea Tiger attack vessels are only at sea during operations and training; when idle they are loaded on large trailers and hidden in the dense jungle southwest of Mullaitivu or even transported to the west coast if needed.

=== Ships ===
The Sea Tigers also crewed a number of larger merchant vessels (sailing under various flags) used for smuggling equipment from neighboring countries. As there were no large ports under LTTE control, the supplies were loaded onto smaller vessels that could land directly on the beaches. From March 2003 to October 2007, the Sri Lankan Navy destroyed ten of these vessels in the Indian Ocean, crippling the LTTE's supply line.

=== Submersibles ===
The LTTE built several crudely built submersibles and semi-submersibles based on Narco-sub designs. All designs were unarmed but some had long nose spars to ram vessels.

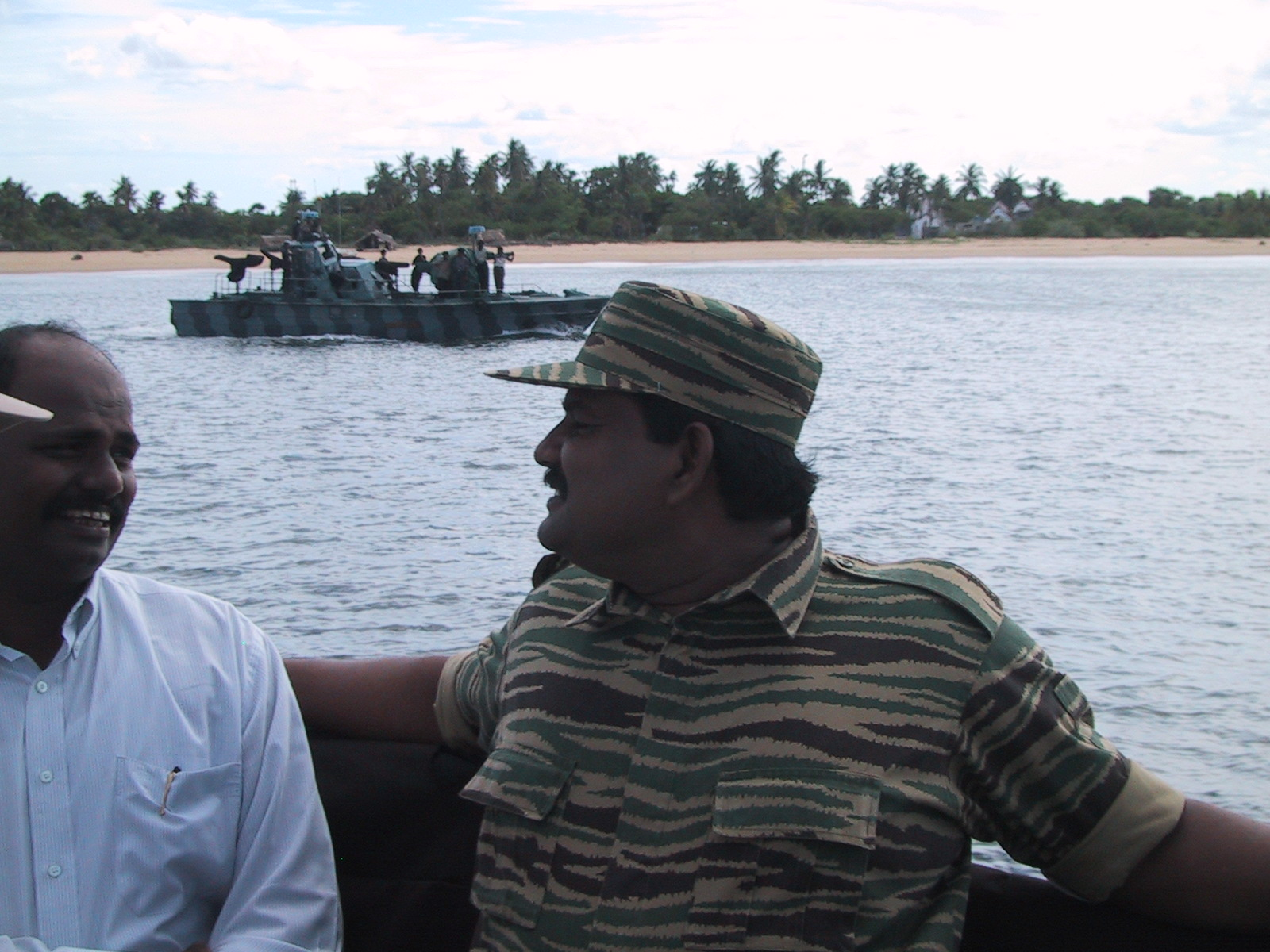
LTTE Sea Tiger head, Colonel Soosai on a Sea Tiger vessel off Mullaitivu

=== Frogmen ===
Frogmen were naval commandos who also served with the Sea Tigers and were used in sinking at least one freighter at the Sri Lankan Navy base at Kankesanturai - KKS, at the northern point of the Jaffna peninsula. They were also involved in the sinking of a SLN supply ship in Trincomalee harbor in May 2008.

Overall, they were naval commandos who specialized in amphibious reconnaissance to prepare for amphibious warfare operations, commando style raids, hostage rescue, irregular warfare, maritime sabotage, naval boarding, providing security at naval base or shore stations, special operations, suicide attack, and underwater demolition (to some extent).

On 17 June 2006 on the coast near Colombo, two frogmen belonging to the Sea Tigers were captured by Sri Lanka's army while trying to bomb ships in Colombo Port. News images showed that the frogmen were using rebreathers, probably a type with one oxygen cylinder across the belly. On capture, both tried to commit suicide using cyanide.

=== Naval Mines ===
The LTTE developed several types of improvised naval mines including moored, floating and limpet mines. The LTTE used smuggled torpedoes to construct mines as their boats were unable to use torpedoes.

=== Personnel ===
The total personnel strength was between 2,000-3,000 women and men. Women operated the boats on an equal footing as their male compatriots. However the number of personnel may vary depending on operational needs. Local arms caches were hidden in the jungle close to villages.

== Analysts' views of Sea Tigers ==
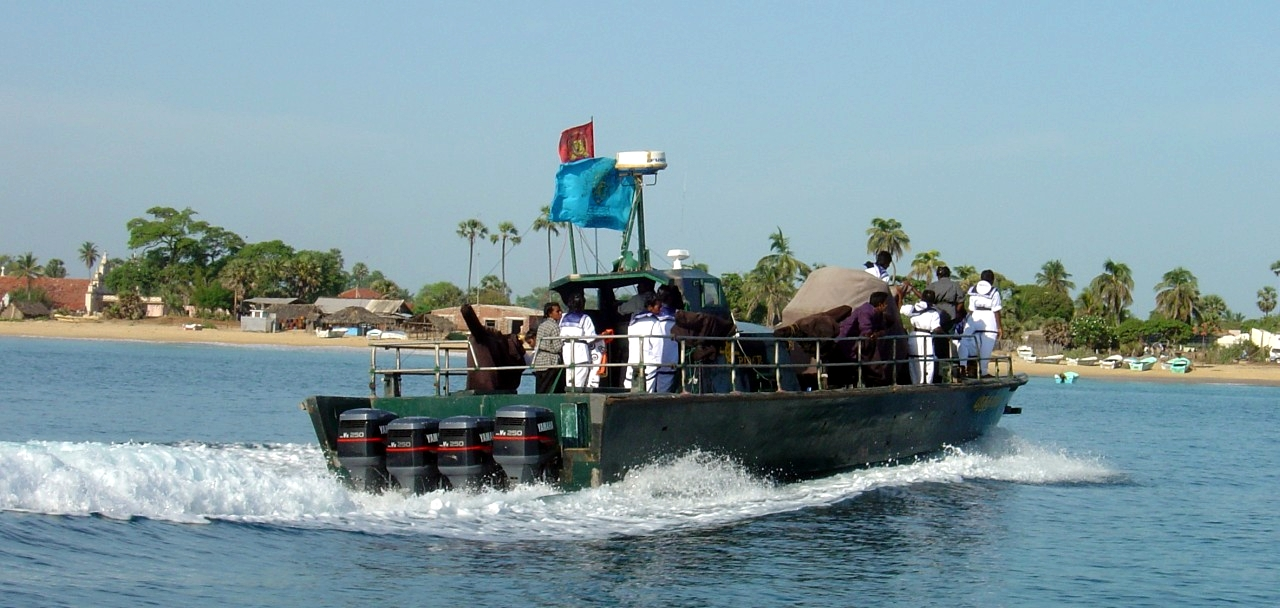
LTTE Sea Tigers boat with a female crew.

Jane's International Defence Review, in a report on Sri Lanka, published a few years ago, pointed out that the Sea Tigers "have taken on the Sri Lankan navy with unprecedented success." A recent publication of the Woodrow Wilson School of Public and International Affairs for the Centre for Strategic and International Studies reckons that they have destroyed 30 per cent of Sri Lanka's navy fiberglass small craft fleet.

The Sea Tigers not relying on communications with their command on shore during ongoing operations, was one factor in their success. The Sri Lankan Navy on the other hand was required to act in accordance with commanders onshore. Sea Tiger intelligence also played a key role in their operations, allowing for detailed and bold operations to be carried out in almost silent mode (highest EMCON).

The basis of Sea Tiger offensive operations could be described as sea control and keeping the SLN on their toes with their extensive sea denial tactics in the northern waters of Sri Lanka. Some analysts say the Sea Tigers have adopted the military theory of 'Versatile Maritime Force'. Sea Tiger operations could also be seen as a clear example of asymmetric warfare.

== Strategic implications ==
=== India ===
India regarded the Sea Tigers as a "nuisance" in South Asian waters and the Indian Armed Forces and State Government of Tamil Nadu had increased naval surveillance in the region. Though no clashes were reported between the Sea Tigers and Indian civil or military ships, Indian experts have suggested the government to "neutralize" it as the ongoing battle between the Tigers and Sri Lankan Navy has affected Indian fishing areas and shipping lanes.

=== Sri Lanka ===
The LTTE once controlled parts of the northern coastline of Sri Lanka, the Sri Lankan forces stationed in the Jaffna peninsula were mainly supplied through naval convoys from Trincomalee in the east. The Sea Tigers bases were well located for attacks on these shipments, and forces the SLN to keep a significant force of fast attack patrol-boats on alert. Sea Tigers have also captured and seized the cargo of at least two Sri Lankan freighters.

In many ways the Sea Tigers had adapted and challenged a larger and more modern Navy, due to their tactics being based on the understanding of SLN operations cycles, doctrine and reaction time.

== Sea piracy ==
The Sea Tigers have been accused of hijacking 4 Sri Lankan supply vessels in the waters of Sri Lanka namely Irish Mona (in August 1995), Misen (in July 1997) Morong Bong (in July 1997) and Princess Kash (in August 1998) but it destroyed by Sri Lankan Navy's Airforce along with cargo in it. They have also dismantled equipment from a drifted vessel named MV Farah III (in December 2006).

In the year 1996, Lawrence Thilakar, a member of the LTTE central committee, said that the Tigers would target both Sri Lankan military inside and outside supply lines. A second development was the LTTE's declaration on 15 July 1997, that all merchant vessels taking supplies northward to Jaffna peninsula would be considered legitimate military targets. This was aimed to cutoff the Sri Lanka's supply line to Jaffna as result of the Sri Lankans' ability to supply themselves by air was drastically reduced due to continues shot down of SLAF's supply planes. The LTTE accused Sri Lanka of

"shipping war materials to Jaffna under the pretext of supplying food and necessities for the people" .

On 28 August 1995, Tigers intercepted and taken control of the passenger ferry Irish Mona near the coastal city of Mullaitivu. The ferry was run by the government of Sri Lanka with the help of a paramilitary group known as EPDP, transporting people from the Jaffna islands to the mainland. The ship's passengers were brought to the coast safely by the Sea Tigers. When the SLN sent its two Dvora boats to investigate the incident both were sunk. The rebels lured the first boat in range of the firing line by posing as passengers waving for help on the ferry's deck, and fired with tank which was hidden in the ground, according to Colombo officials. It was then came to light that the ship was turned into a deadly trap, aimed at the Sri Lankan Navy gunboats. A short time later, the passengers (Tamils) and the ferry and its crew (Sinhalese) were released, although two of them were detained and released later on 25 October 1998.

On 1 July 1997, Sea Tigers captured another Sri Lankan supply ship named MV Misen off the north-western coast of Pesalai. The Tigers' claimed that the ship was transporting Sri Lankan troops to the Jaffna peninsula. After taking the crew of 9 members off the ship, the Sri Lankan government claims the Tigers burned it down. Later on except one all of them were released The last 1 crew member (Sinhalese) were released on 25 October 1998 and handed over to ICRC.

On 8 July 1997, a Sri Lankan supply ship named Morong Bong was detained by Tamil Tigers off the Jaffna peninsula and had taken it to Alampil in Mullaitivu with the Sea Tigers escorts where it was anchored. According to the Tigers, one of the 38 crewmen on the ship was killed when the ship took off for open waters after the Tigers demanded it stop. Later, the crew of 37 were detained. On 13 July 1997, the entire crew was released. According to reports, the captain of the ship sympathized with the rebels and called the Sri Lankan government 'merciless'.

On 14 August 1998, LTTE cleverly hijacked Sri Lankan supply ship MV Princess Kash loaded with 60tons of cargo (worth of 500 million rupees) at the Mullaitivu sea and escorted towards the coast of Mullaitivu by the Sea Tigers gunboats. The 21 member crew was captured including 17 Indians and taken to the coast by the Sea Tigers. It was then revealed by the Sea Tigers to the ship captain that for the last two days only Sea Tigers had been interacting with them, and not with the navy and it was Sea Tigers who asked them to stop the ship in Mullaitivu waters. Later, the ship was bombed at 4:15pm by Sri Lankan Airforce Kfir bombers. Prior to the ship's bombing, the captain, V. N. Capro, told the Sri Lankan Navy the LTTE was investigating them and that settlement could be reached through negotiation. The VoT further reported the captain had requested the SLN not to take any military action until then, but the vessel was bombed regardless of his request. But the SLN said that they acted to prevent the delivery of "dangerous merchandise" to the Tigers, after their doubts were strengthened after the captain of the ship was alleged to be "acting in connivance with the LTTE". The crew were later handed over to ICRC on 16 August. Around 600 Jaffna traders, protested against the bombing of the ship. They accused the government as they are starving the Tamil people in Jaffna and reducing the supplies. They also demanded the Sri Lankan government to provide compensation for the cargo which was destroyed by the Sri Lankan Airforce In an interview with Rediff reporter, ships' captain said,

"I think the navy bombed the ship because they did not want any proof left behind about their communication failure. They did not even realise that so many people's lives depended on that ship. My certificates and clothes, everything had been destroyed. I was left only with the clothes I was wearing."

On 23 December 2006, the crew of 25 members of a Jordanian ship which was carrying 14,000 tons of rice from India to South Africa, MV Farah III, that was drifting towards Mullaitivu coast due to engine failure were rescued and safely brought to the coast. On 23 decem., the Sea Tiger officials said that the captain of the Ship is trying to bring the ship to operation before getting aground. The ship then agrounded on the same day. On 24 December, when the captain of the crew was contacted by TamilNet and when asked whether the Sri Lanka Navy and the Sea Tigers have engaged in a military standoff, the ship captain told that,

"this, I guess is all political. We are all safe and we have good cooperation here. We were offered a good place to sleep."

They were handed over to ICRC on 25 December at 10 am. On 26 December, an Indian newspaper, The Hindu, accused the Tamil Tigers of forcing the crew to abandon the vessel and risking their lives. According to it, the skipper of the vessel said;

"First they tried to set up a bomb and explode the anchor cable and when it failed they ordered us to weigh anchor. Then, they opened fire four times to scare my crew and force us into smaller boats. We were travelling at high speed. When the boat hit waves we were tossed about. I injured my back."

He also alleged that the Tigers dismantled and removed all radio communication equipment and radar from the vessel. On May 1, 2007 Sayed Sulaiman, the chairman of the ship's owners, Salam International Trading Company gave an interview to the BBC Tamil service, saying,

"We hear from the parties who are concerned with the ship, the insurance company etc., that ... everything that could be taken – like the rice, lights, generators – has been taken from the ship. The ship is now bare."

The MV Sik Yang, a 2,818-ton Malaysian-flag cargo ship which sailed from Tuticorin, India on May 25, 1999 was reported missing in waters near Sri Lanka. The ship with a cargo of bagged salt was due at the Malaysian port of Malacca on May 31. The fate of the ship's crew of 15 is unknown. A report published on June 30, 1999 states that the vessel "may have been" captured by the LTTE as it went missing in the waters of Sri Lanka, according to 'Anti-Shipping Activity Messages'.

While some of these missions have been purely opportunist in nature, most have, in some manner, been executed to support the group's on-ground war effort. In relation to more concerted maritime combat, however, piracy has not featured prominently in the LTTE's operational activities, and should be considered an adjunct rather than an integral feature of its overall tactical agenda.
