= 1987–1989 JVP insurrection =

Armed revolt in Sri Lanka

- Part of the Cold War and Sri Lankan Civil War
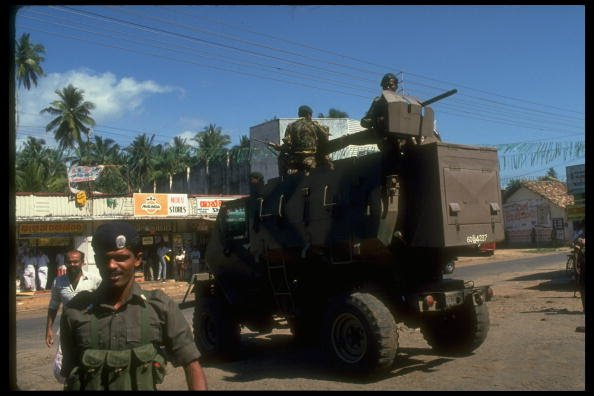
- Sri Lankan army on patrol in a village to combat the Insurgents
Date	15 April 1987 – 29 December 1989 (2 years, 9 months and 14 days)
Location	Sri Lanka
Result	Sri Lankan Government victory: Emergency conditions in South-western and Central provinces lifted; Insurgency declined following the fall of the Eastern Bloc

Belligerents
Sri Lanka; India; Pro-government paramilitaries: Eagles of the Central Hills; Black Cats; ...and at least 8 other minor groups; Anti-JVP leftist militias: Peoples Revolutionary Red Army; Vikalpa Kandayama	Janatha Vimukthi Peramuna: Deshapremi Janatha Viyaparaya; Patriotic People's Armed Troops

Commanders and leaders
J. R. Jayawardene; Ranasinghe Premadasa; Ranjan Wijeratne; Gen. Cecil Waidyaratne; Col. Janaka Perera; Rajiv Gandhi; V. P. Singh	Rohana Wijeweera; Upatissa Gamanayake; Keerthi Vijayabahu †; Somawansa Amarasinghe (surrendered); Shantha Bandara †; Lalith Wijerathna; Ranjitham Gunarathnam

Units involved
Sri Lanka Armed Forces; Sri Lanka Army; Sri Lankan Police; Special Task Force; Sri Lanka Civil Defence Force; Indian Peace Keeping Force	North-Eastern cell; South-Western cell; Central Cell

Strength
40,000; 6,000; 40,000 (1989)	2,000 members; 80,000+ supporters

Casualties and losses
6,700 killed by insurgents; 300+ killed in direct combat, multiple heavy infantry vehicles destroyed mostly in landmine blasts; 250+ killed in direct combat, multiple installments attacked; SLCDF: 98 killed; 14 Jawans killed by the DJV, 1 heavy infantry vehicle destroyed (Note: On July 25, 1989 DJV blew up a truckload of Indian soldiers killing 14 of them before seizing all their weapons (Note: #Insurgency in Kallar))	10,000–60,000 captured and/or killed 20,000+ disappeared
- Total killed: 60,000–80,000; Disappeared: 20,000+

The 1987–1989 JVP insurrection, also known as the 1988–1989 revolt, was an armed revolt in Sri Lanka led by the Marxist–Leninist Janatha Vimukthi Peramuna (JVP) against the Government of Sri Lanka, then led by the right-wing United National Party (UNP). The insurrection, like the previous one in 1971, was unsuccessful. The main phase of the insurrection was a low-intensity conflict that lasted from April 1987 to December 1989. (Note: The first attacks took place in 1986 but many historians consider this to be the prelude to an open insurrection.) The insurgents led by the JVP resorted to subversion, assassinations, raids, and attacks on military and civilian targets while the Sri Lankan government reacted through counter-insurgency operations to suppress the revolt using army and paramilitary groups who were allegedly backed by UNP government.

Guerrilla forces of the insurrection were led by the military branch of the JVP, the Deshapremi Janatha Viyaparaya (DJV). The insurgency reached its peak in 1988 and impacted all Sri Lankan civilians, including those without any political stake in the situation. Attacks on civilians by pro-government guerrillas began after the election of president Ranasinghe Premadasa. A period of mass killings by the government began soon after the ceasefire of the Sri Lankan civil war and the expulsion of the Indian Peace Keeping Force, resulting in the death of many Sri Lankan civilians and multiple Indian expatriates.

The JVP received support from its one-time enemy, the Sri Lanka Freedom Party (SLFP). However, this alliance broke down following the SLFP's participation in the provincial elections which the JVP and the Liberation Tigers of Tamil Eelam (LTTE) openly boycotted. The government lifted the ban on both parties in 1987, hoping that they would participate in the elections, but this attempt ultimately failed. For over two years, the state saw mass militancy of youth and workers, mass execution, and feuds between government militias and the JVP. Anti-JVP militias allegedly backed by the UNP government also caused violence, including the Black Cat group, the Eagles of the Central Hills and the leftist People's Revolutionary Red Army along with nine to eleven other groups.

In 1989, Sri Lanka Armed Forces launched Operation Combine (Ops Combine). Even after revolutionary leader, Rohana Wijeweera was killed, the insurgency persisted. Violence escalated when the DJV leader Keerthi Vijayabahu took over. DJV members also operated in the LTTE-occupied areas of Trincomalee against the Sri Lanka Armed Forces and the IPKF. The DJV was supported by Tamil militants so that it could also operate as a front against the Indian forces. Many smaller anti-government groups gave up the armed struggle, but the largest threats persisted, with the DJV continuing to operate as an armed group until December 1989. Ranjan Wijeratne, who played a major role in the Ops Combine, claimed he was ready to launch a similar counterinsurgency against the LTTE. Wijeratne was assassinated in 1991, which led to the outbreak of the second phase of the Sri Lanka-LTTE conflict, known as the Second Eelam War.

== Background ==
=== History of Janatha Vimukthi Peramuna ===
Founded by communist Rohana Wijeweera, the Janatha Vmukthi Peramuna (JVP) is known for its revolutionary youth background. The organization was banned more than once when the group was first involved in Anti-American protests against the Vietnam War in the 1970s. Since then, the movement was called the "Che Guevara clique" (a nickname the JVP did not claim) by the Sri Lankan government and international media. The group was first internationally recognized as a political party when it participated in a communist youth conference in Havana, Cuba in 1978.

=== 1971 JVP Insurrection ===
The JVP launched an open revolt against Prime Minister Sirimavo Bandaranaike's government in April 1971. While the government was caught off guard, it was able to subdue the insurgency in a matter of weeks. The insurgency may have led to the death of 4,000–5,000 people. Over 20,000 suspected rebels, mostly young people, were arrested in the period that followed the insurrection, but most were released after rehabilitation. The Sri Lankan government called upon India for military assistance, however Indian involvement was less known at the time of the insurrection.

Rohana Wijeweera and the other major leaders of the insurgency were sentenced to prison and the JVP was banned as a political party. However, all of them were released in 1977 by new Prime Minister J. R. Jayewardene after the UNP won the general elections after running on a platform of amnesty for those prosecuted by the infamous Criminal Justice Commission.

=== Tamil insurgency and pro-United States policy ===
During the mid-1980s, as the Sri Lankan Civil War with Tamil militants in the north became more intense, there was a significant shift in the ideology and goals of the JVP. Initially Marxist in orientation, the JVP claimed to represent the oppressed of both the Tamil and Sinhalese communities. Later, however, the group increasingly began to identify as a Sinhalese nationalist organization, opposing any compromise with the Tamil insurgency.

After the war, the JVP continued as a political party advocating for peace and reconciliation between Sinhalese and Tamil communities.

=== Third ban ===
Rohana Wijeweera received the third-highest number of votes in the 1982 presidential elections, and the Jayawardene government feared the increasing popularity of the JVP.

The JVP would continue to be involved in more controversy along with the Nava Sama Samaja Party following an assembly held on 6 July 1983, which was held in support of Tamil civilians; at the assembly, NSSP leader Vikramabahu Karunaratne defended the Tamil insurgency. The government was greatly threatened by these parties, and alleged that three socialist parties were preparing to topple the government. The Jayawardene government also alleged that the JVP was involved in the Black July riots, but provided no concrete evidence. Due to these allegations, Jayawardene banned the party, a move which was suspected to be due to his fear of losing future elections to leftist parties as he was highly pro-U.S. and anti-Soviet due to his anti-Indian policy. It is also to be noted that during this time, Jayawardene degraded diplomatic relations with socialist countries like Cuba and the Soviet Union.

== Preparation ==
Having been banned and driven underground, the JVP began preparing to overthrow the government. They targeted political opponents, carried out robberies in the form of bank heists to collect funds, and began acquiring weapons, usually pistols and shotguns from owners who had gained gun licenses from the government. Thereafter, they planned to raid armories of the government, which had deployed its forces to the north and east of the country to counter the Tamil insurgency.

The politburo members of the insurrection were Rohana Wijeweera, Upatissa Gamanayake, Sumith Athukorala, D. M. Ananda, Saman Piyasiri Fernando, Piyadasa Ranasinghe, H. B. Herath, Gunaratne Wanasinghe, P. R. B. Wimalarathna, Somawansa Amarasinghe, Shantha Bandara, Nandathilaka Galappaththi and Lalith Wijerathna. Until 1987, no arms were available for the youth military arm of the JVP, the Deshapremi Janatha Viyaparaya (DJV) to train their soldiers. The collection of weapons for this purpose began in early 1987, and weapons training began in mid-1987, with deserters from the army providing instruction.

During this period, police inspectors reported their pistols to be missing and landlords were given shotguns by the police to defend themselves. The DJV stole weapons and ammunition from military bases, defense academies, and landlords. A spike in gun thefts were reported from Balangoda, Deniyaya, Hakmana, and Nochchiyagama in 1987. There were reports in May 1987 that an increasing number of youths were stealing such weapons from police stations in the south. 600 weapons, mostly shotguns, were taken by DJV in July 1987.

Armed with these stolen weapons, DJV members were trained in universities and were joined by new members from lower castes. At the start of the insurgency, it was estimated by western diplomats that of the 10,000 armed carders of the DJV, approximately 3,000 were well trained. According to Somawansa Amarasinghe, a Central Committee member of the JVP, these groups were also provided aid by North Korea since 1970.

== Prelude to open insurrection ==
On 15 December 1986, the JVP abducted and murdered Daya Pathirana, leader of the Independent Students' Union (ISU) of the University of Colombo, who was a rival of the Socialist Students Union, the student wing of the JVP. By this time, the JVP had been designated as a terrorist organization by the Jayawardene government.

JVP carried out small scale bombings throughout 1986, but what marked the beginning of the pre-insurgency took place on 7 May 1986, when the JVP claimed responsibility for a large bombing in the Colombo Central Telegram office which killed 14 and coordinated anti-Indian propaganda in Sinhalese universities.

== Insurgency ==
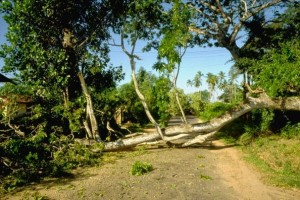
Trees felled across streets by the DJV to block food supply.

=== Early attacks ===
==== Attack on the Pallekele Army Camp ====
On 15 April 1987, JVP attacked the army detachment in Pallekele in Kandy. An unknown amount of carders, under the directions of Shantha Bandara and Premakumar Gunaratnam, the JVP seized twelve Type 56 assault rifles, seven sub-machine guns, and ammunition.

==== Indo-Sri Lanka Accord ====
On 26 May 1987, Sri Lankan Armed Forces launched the Vadamarachchi Operation (English: "Operation Liberation") with the objective of defeating the LTTE militarily and re-establishing government control in areas dominated by Tamil militants. However, the second phase of Operation Liberation was abandoned with the Indian intervention with Operation Poomalai, which led to the signing of the Indo-Sri Lanka Accord in Colombo on 29 July 1987 and the arrival of the first troops of the Indian Peace Keeping Force (IPKF) on 30 July. These events were widely unpopular among the general public in Sri Lanka as well as the Sri Lankan Armed Forces. For instance, Sri Lankan soldiers say that Indian soldiers had to tie their guns to themselves to avoid losing them. Protests in the Southern parts of the island that began against the Indo-Sri Lanka Accord turned into rioting and government imposed a curfew to control the rioting and establish normalcy. On 31 July 1987, government party member of parliament Jinadasa Weerasinghe was shot dead, which was blamed on the JVP.

==== Attacks on military instaltions in the South ====
The prospect of Tamil autonomy in the north and East together with the presence of Indian troops stirred up a wave of Sinhalese nationalism and the sudden growth of anti-government violence by the DJV which had emerged as an offshoot of the JVP and was led by Saman Piyasiri Fernando. On 7 June 1987, Sri Lanka Air Force Base, SLAF Katunayake, and the Kotelawala Defence Academy were attacked. Weapons and ammunition were stolen, while four of the attackers were killed. These attacks were led by the militant unit, Patriotic People's Armed Troops. Afterwards, DJV claimed responsibility and a Criminal Investigation Department investigation resulted in the arrest of thirteen JVP members.

==== Attack in the Parliament ====
On 18 August, when the first parliamentary group meeting took place after the Indo-Sri Lanka Accord, an assassination attempt was made on the president and prime minister by the DJV: resulting in the death of Keerthisena Abeywickrama, District Minister for Matara and one other. Lalith Athulathmudali, the Minister of National Security and Deputy Minister of Defence, was also severely wounded.

The beginning of the insurgency was marked when a few days later the BBC correspondent John Rettie received a call from an unknown caller who spoke English claiming he had an organization that consisted of 2,000 fighters and was ready to overthrow the Sri Lankan government. Rettie received this call after the Sri Lankan parliament was attacked.

On 4 October 1987, 50 members of the DJV raided a security forces camp in Trincomalee; DJV succeeded and stole 6 T-56 assault rifles, 3 shotguns, .303 British rifles, and ammunition.

=== Intimidation tactics ===
After this, the DJV launched a campaign of intimidation against the government and the ruling party: United National Party (UNP), killing a large amount of its members and MPs as well as members of other political parties. Organized into cells of multiple Joint Commands based mostly in Kandy in the centre of the island, the JVP murdered upwards of thousands of people between 1988 and 1989. Throughout this period, it crippled the country with enforced hartals (general strikes) for two years. Individuals or organizations were intimidated via messages, posters, or graffiti that appeared overnight. Those that did not cooperate were killed, with their family members often harmed as well. Executions were mostly carried out during the night with JVP/DJV militants coming to the homes of victims and carrying them away to be tortured, executed, and left as an example. Most of these victims were killed by the Type 56 assault rifle or handmade Galkatas rifles. In most cases, the funerals of these victims were not allowed by the JVP, traditional last rites were forbidden, and the caskets were to be carried below knee level as a mark of disrespect. Acts of sabotage on government property were common, with electric transformers being a common target. Tire burning was also practised by the JVP at times. With these techniques of sabotage and intimidation, the JVP was able to bring the country to standstill.

=== Assassinations ===
==== Political assassinations ====
Officials were targeted after receiving death threats which demanded that the victims leave the United National Party, victims of this manner of assassination included the wife of the MP for Karandeniya district Daya Sepali Senadheera; Galagedara MP W.M.P.G. Banda, and Borella MP Lesley Ranagal.

As the insurgency escalated, numerous public figures were assassinated by the JVP. On 1 October 1987, the Lanka Sama Samaja Party and Ceylon Communist Party offices were attacked and burnt, while former Deputy Minister for Education and MP for Matara, B. Y. Tudawe was shot, but survived. Harsha Abhayawardene, the UNP Secretary General, was killed by JVP gunmen in Wellawatte on 23 December 1987, DJV gunmen fired T-56 guns on full-automatic killing three others. Lionel Jayatilleke, Minister of Relief and Rehabilitation, was shot dead on 26 September 1988 near a temple in an attack which killed three other people. On 7 February 1988, Mervyn Cooray, MP for Panadura, survived an assassination attempt. On 1 May, the newly elected UNP Secretary General Nandalal Fernando was also killed and the Galle District Minister G. V. S. de Silva was shot dead later that month. On 21 October, Tudor Keerthinanda, a UNP Working Committee Member, was killed.

==== Assassination and funeral of Vijaya Kumaratunga ====
Vijaya Kumaratunga's assassination was one of the turning points of the insurgency. Pro-Kumaratunga groups attacked suspects of both government forces and the DJV with the help given by other socialist anti-insurgent militias. Kumaratunga was shot in the head with a Type 56 assault rifle outside his home in the outskirts of Colombo on 16 February 1988 by Lionel Ranasinghe, known as Gamini. Ranasinghe confessed to the murder under questioning by the Criminal Investigation Department, saying that he had been carrying out orders given to him by the DJV. However, a presidential commission report appointed in 1994 by Kumaratunga widow Chandrika Kumaratunga claimed that President Ranasinghe Premadasa of the UNP and two government ministers, Gamini Lokuge and Ranjan Wijeratne, were behind the Kumaranatunga assassination.

Kumaratunga's funeral, on 21 February 1988, attracted huge crowds and was the first funeral to be broadcast live on Sri Lankan television. It was held at Independence Memorial Square in Colombo as a state funeral, even though he represented the opposition to the UNP government. The day of his assassination is widely known as "The Horrible Tuesday" or "The Darkest Tuesday in Sri Lankan History". His death is still mourned by many people in Sri Lanka.

==== Military and police assassinations ====
One of the key police officers leading the effort to counter the JVP, Senior Superintendent of Police Terrence Perera, was killed by gunmen in Battaramulla on 3 December 1987. 1989 saw the killing of Senior Superintendent of Police Bennet Perera, who was gunned down at Mount Lavinia on 1 May 1989. The Assistant Superintendent of Police was killed on 23 August 1989, and Captain B. M. Perera of the military police was shot dead in Moratuwa on 12 September 1989.

==== Killing of dissidents ====
JVP killings were not limited to those in government or the higher classes. Close to 50 school principals and tea estate owners were killed in 1988 and 1989 for defying JVP orders sent via short memos known as chits.

Many other professionals were also killed for defying JVP orders including Dr. Gladys Jayawardene, (Note: She was also the sister of J.R Jayawardene which may have been a reason for the assassination of her.) broadcaster Premakeerthi de Alwis, newscaster Sagarika Gomes, engineer D. C. Athukorale, and corporate director Liayana Pathirana. Many wealthy businessmen were also killed, including the Shanmugam brothers, K. Gunaratnam, and Shabeer Hussain. Several Indian expatriates were also killed, including the Banshalls working at the Pelwatta Sugar Factory, D. K. Sundaram, P. Nadar Weeramuni, and Ann Herchoi.

During the insurgency, JVP assassinated a total of 117 members of the United Socialist Alliance which includes the EPRLF, NSSP, CPSL, TELO and the Sri Lanka Mahajana Pakshaya. PD Wimalasena, a veteran trade union activist of the LSSP was killed in May 1989; a year prior, LW Panditha, a Communist Party trade union activist, was killed in Dematagoda. Gamini Medagedara, another Communist Party member, was killed at Polonnaruwa. KAD Saddhatissa, a retired school principal living in Akuressa and supporter of Communist party, was killed while he was sick and in bed. His son was also allegedly killed. JVP then ordered his villagers not to put up white flags. Six members of an NSSP family were killed at Pujapitya in Katu.

=== 1989 attacks ===
In 1989, the government accused the DJV of having caused the death of over 35,000 people, mostly government supporters Another report, however, states that the JVP and its militia, the Deshapremi Janatha Viyaparaya (DJV), were responsible for "more than 10,000" deaths thus supporting evidence of the number of deaths caused by the government. The JVP also expressed its patriotic ideals from 1986; when its fighters (PPF) called for a boycott of Indian goods and gave warning to all Indian nationals to leave the island before 14 June 1989 At the beginning of August 1989, seven people died following encounters between the JVP and police forces A leading Buddhist monk was gunned down by the JVP on 3 August 1989. Later that month, a top journalist and some civilians were killed by the JVP, while some of its own supporters died in the encounters. A successful strike by transportation and health workers were called by the JVP in mid-August 1989, thus showing the extent of JVP unionist support. At the end of August 1989, the JVP threatened to target soldiers' families if they did not resign from governmental forces. The threats were carried out soon after, in the context of another strike organized by the JVP on 28 August

Violent clashes occurred again at the beginning of October 1989, leading to the deaths of 59 people during the 7–8 October weekend alone. At the beginning of November 1989, clashes between JVP and government forces caused at least 60 deaths in the space of 24 hours. One deputy of the United National Party was assassinated by JVP gunmen on 25 June 1989, a few days after the imposition of a state of emergency throughout Sri Lanka, imposed by the government as result of an increase in civil strife The following day, the JVP called for a general strike in Colombo and warned residents to remain indoors because of fighting in the streets.

As the JVP threatened to attack the Indian High Commission and India House in Sri Lanka, India brought its firepower to Colombo. Having informed the government, India airlifted a heavily armed contingent of troops to Ratmalana. The troops landed at the Ratmalana air base on July 27 to fight against the DJV. The government tried to resist but it however failed to resist the troops. Indian troops took up position at the High Commission and India House. The Indian High Commission asserted that its troops would protect Indian lives and property regardless of the consequences. Indian troops also took up positions at the Taj Samuda, where many Indian diplomatic staff took refuge. They were forced to move into the Taj in the second week of June 1989, as the JVP posed a heavy threat.

JVP had a good spy network which they used to extort money. In 1989 JVP came to the home of garment exporter Ramya Weerakoon and demanded money. "Come out you and your daughters, We're the Patriotic People's Movement" they said. They mentioned a bank account to which Ramya had received a remittance for a shipment sent out earlier. She said the payment was for raw material for the new shipment. "We don't care," the militants said. "Our leaders have ordered us to take Rs 50,000 from you. We will come here tomorrow. Have the money ready." they said further. The next day they came at 9.30 pm and took the money away. Weapons were purchased for Rs. 50,000 from Nimrods.

JVP brought forward not thousands but ten thousands of workers aside its militant background. Most tea plantation workers in the southern Ratnapura district went on strikes from 7 September 1989 in response to a call by the JVP. Neither the imposition of emergency nor the threat of dismissal had any effect on the rebelling workers, possibly because of the social forces the JVP inspired. The striking workers also could not be dismissed as that might have resulted in a wave of sympathy strikes in other sectors. JVP was highly accepted not just by the lower classes or oppressed workers but even middle classes due to the patriotic ideals it has shown. Private transport was nearly impossible, not even three-wheelers were allowed in streets.

The JVP used various militant arms to attack the enemy. The most notable was the Patriotic People's Movement of Sri Lanka commonly known in the country as the Patriotic People's Front. It had various other sub-guerrilla groups such as the Patriotic People's Battalion and the People's Militant Front. The students' wing was named the Patriotic Students' Union. JVP also had a quantity of quick firing automatic rifles better than what the IPKF had. Peradeniya undergraduates were armed with lethal weapons.

==== Destruction of property ====
The JVP destroyed 113 vehicles owned by politicians, 76 houses of police officers, various homes of Indian businessmen, 553 C.T.B. buses, 15 C.T.B. depots, and a C.T.B. workshop. It destroyed various foreign construction projects.

JVP did not hold as aggressive a campaign against government property until the government launched a counter-insurgency. The group then destroyed 16 trains, 12 rail tracks, and 24 railway stations. In addition, the DJV sabotaged 132 electric transformers, 13 pylons, 69 power lines, two power stations, 25 electric meters, and nine electricity sub stations.

=== Calls for ceasefire ===
In September 1989 President Premadasa convened an all-party conference to discuss proposals to resolve the crisis. The JVP refused to attend, however, and the main opposition party, SLFP, pulled out at the end of October and gave up arms. The opposition United Socialist Alliance (USA) also boycotted the proceedings along with the JVP. The LTTE agreed and gave up arms with their demands of expelling the IPKF being met. As of late 1989, the JVP was the only remaining significant threat to the Sri Lankan Government.

=== Insurgency in Kallar ===
The DJV was active in Trincomalee which the LTTE declared its capital city. The first notable activity was when 50 members of the DJV raided the camp in Kallar (Note: Also known as Kallaruppu in Tamil and Kallaru after the Sinhalization) prior to the heavy deployment of the IPKF. (Note: as mentioned previously in #Early attacks) After a 20-minute gunfight, the DJV captured the camp. The DJVs Trincomalee sector killed 14 Jawans in a landmine blast in 1989. Many at the time were unaware of this attack, and in order to avoid conflict with the Indian army, JVP did not claim responsibility.

Multiple Tamil groups (Note: For citation and information, see List of Sri Lankan Tamil militant groups) assisted the JVP through the links that Premakumar Gunaratnam established to certain militant groups active in Trincomalee who were also in conflict with government authorities and the LTTE. Wijeweera himself visited an EPRLF camp to get training for the JVP cadre. Some members of the JVP also went to the Northern Province to get training. It is alleged that the People's Liberation Organisation of Tamil Eelam (PLOTE) directly supplied landmines to the JVP and gave them training on the usage of landmines as well.

=== Counter-insurgency operations ===
Early counter insurgency efforts began under the Jayawardene government, but these failed to slow or resist the insurgency in any meaningful way. The JVP continued to violently fight back against government forces, causing a kind of fear paralysis among military and police forces.

==== Paramilitary counter-insurgency ====
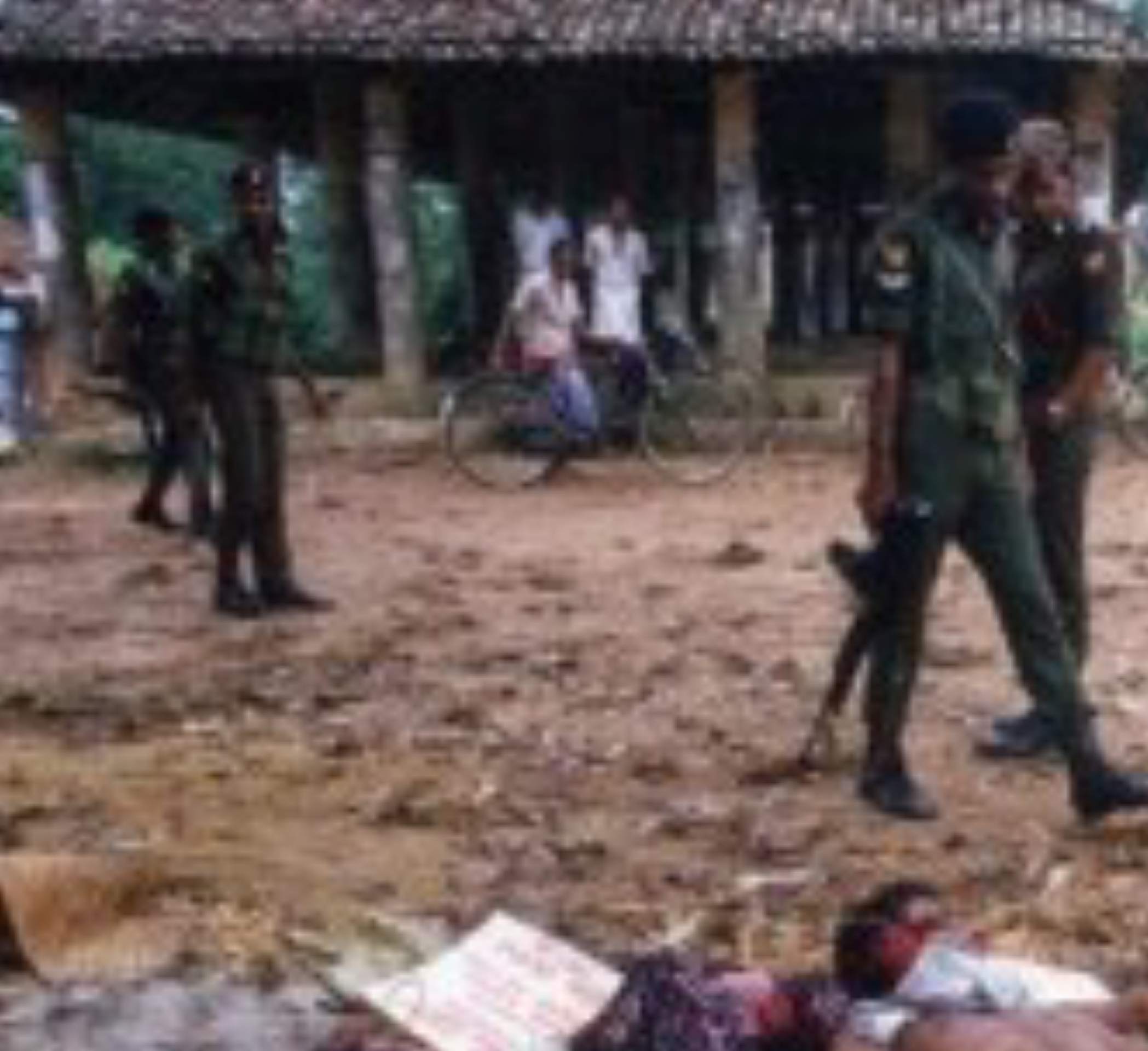
Sri Lanka Army looks at dead bodies of suspected JVP members killed by the People's Revolutionary Red Army

However, in 1989 Ranasinghe Premadasa was elected president amidst a mass boycott of elections by multiple militant organizations. He openly supported the LTTE in order to end the threats to the government. Without the support of the Sri Lankan government, the STF trained with the aid of United Kingdom and the Israeli Defence Forces (IDF) were not strong enough to take on the insurgency alone. When the JVP offensive came to a peak, government paramilitaries such as the 'Black Cats', 'Yellow Cats', 'Scorpions' and 'Eagles' were used in order resist the insurgency.

These paramilitary groups were involved in mass killings of Sri Lankan civilians during their operations. In reaction to a DJV attack on military personnel which killed fifteen soldiers, members of the Eagles paramilitary group launched an attack and killed more than 82 suspected JVP supporters. All victims of the attack were unarmed, and victims included children and Indian Tamils. In a similar incident on 5 October, the Eagles killed fourteen members of the staff of the University of Peradeniya. Later claiming responsibility for the attack, the Eagles claimed that the victims were JVP supporters which engineered the murder of Captain T.E. Nagahawatte, the Assistant Registrar of the university and a volunteer officer.

Even when responsibility for these mass killings were claimed, security forces would deny all knowledge of missing or killed persons. When relatives inquired about missing persons at police stations or army camps, they would sometimes refuse to register any complaint. While sometimes the bodies of those taken away were allowed to be identified by relatives, in other cases those who were abducted or killed were never traced. Some of the missing people were later found to be in the custody of security forces, being arrested and detained for indeterminate periods without trial, lending evidence to the participation of regular security forces in paramilitary operations. In addition to these abductions and mass killings, gang rape or other forms of rape by both paramilitary groups and official soldiers was also observed.

==== Detention camps ====
In response to the JVP attacks, the government has been accused of using detention camps in order to put down the JVP insurrection. These camps were said to be run by units of the police who were officially tasked with disarming the rebels. It is believed that 5,000 to 10,000 JVP rebels were either tortured or killed in camps established across the country. The largest camp was in Batalanda and was run by the Black Cat paramilitary group, with Ranil Wickremesinghe having been accused of being the political authority in charge of overseeing the detention camp. After the insurrection, a Batalanda commission was appointed to look into violations of human rights which took place at the Batalanda detention camp. The commission recommended that legal action be taken against Wickremesinghe, although ultimately no action was taken against him.

=== Notable attacks ===
Although much of the insurgency was a low-intensity conflict, with targeted assassinations and intimidation forming the majority of the conflict, major attacks include the 1987 grenade attack in the Sri Lankan Parliament and 1989 Temple of the Tooth attack. In addition, the militant wing of the JVP led by Saman Piyasiri Fernando staged several major attacks on military installations in the south of the island and a small number in the East were led by Premakumar Gunaratnam.

=== Attacks on military installations ===
- April 1987 Pallekele Army Camp attack
- 1987 Kallar Army Camp attack
- Kallar Indian Peacekeeping Force camp attack
- May 1987 SLAF Katunayake camp and Kotelawala Defence Academy attacks
- April 1988 SLAF Katunayake camp attack
- 1988 Pannala Nation Air Force camp
- 1988 Kumbukke Army camp
- 1989 Auxiliary Force Training Camp at Pannala attack
- 1989 Panagoda Cantonment attack
- 1989 landmine attack on the IPKF
- 1989 Colombo Police Field Force Headquarters attack
- More attacks on certain police stations.

=== Prison uprisings ===
- 1987 Bogambara Prison attack
- 1988 Magazine prison break

=== Attacks on civilian targets ===
- 1986 Colombo Telegraph office bombing
- 1987 grenade attack in the Sri Lankan Parliament
- 1988 Kathireshan Hindu temple bombing
- 1989 Temple of the Tooth attack
- Attack on the Kataragama Temple

In many of attacks, the JVP through the DJV targeted the armories capturing weapons and ammunition that it claimed to use against Indian Peace Keeping Forces. In total the JVP killed 342 police personnel, 209 armed forces personnel and 98 Sri Lankan home guards in combat, with many more being killed outside direct conflict. DJV also used landmines to destroy various infantry vehicles.

== Anti-India campaign ==
Aside its military activity, the JVP conducted a social campaign against the Indian intervention. In 1986, even prior to the signing of the Indo-Lanka deal, JVP began delivering posters warning about a possible Indian invasion. The JVP undertook numerous anti-Indian propaganda efforts, including protest strikes, prohibition of wearing the Indian Sari, and boycotts of Indian goods. Despite their openly anti-Indian sentiment, the JVP denied any violence against Indian Tamils.

The ideology of the JVP may have rapidly changed, but some speculated that it may have been split in two, one faction more nationalistic than the other. The JVPs propaganda, made people rethink whether the Indian Army actually wanted to defend the island or annex its territory indirectly. By 1988, however, the Indian Army had already suffered over 500 casualties fighting only the Tamil militants.

=== Attacks on provisional elections ===
The JVP in opposition to the 13th Amendment which was brought as a suggestion from India, formed the National Salvation Front with the Sri Lanka Freedom Party (SLFP) but felt betrayed when the SLFP participated in elections and began a violent campaign against them as well. (Note: See #Assassination and funeral of Vijaya Kumaratunga)

== Impact on civilians ==
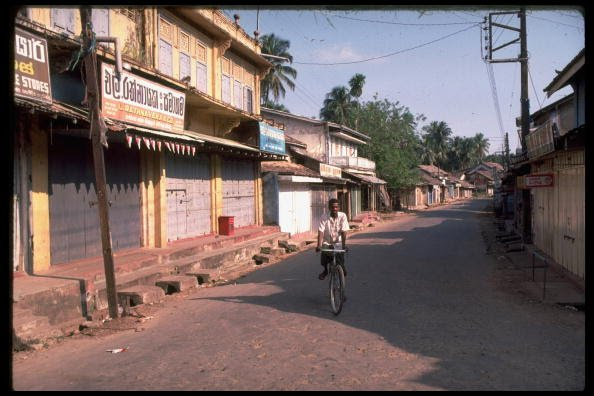
A village locked down due to a JVP-enforced hartal

=== Attacks on security forces' families ===
The JVP made a serious misjudgment when, through the DJV, it called for the killing of members of the families of the security personnel. This destroyed the small but significant amount of support that it enjoyed among the lower ranks of the armed forces, and made it possible for the government to justify its campaign of terror.

Most notable of the attacks on families of the security personal was the attack on a family of Deputy Inspector General of Police Premadasa Udugampola when on 24 July 1988 his ancestral home in Poddala was surrounded and set ablaze by suspected members of the JVP. Following this, Udugampola began a ruthless crackdown of the JVP in the Southern and Central provinces.

As a means of pacifying the support base of the JVP, a wide range of acts of cruelty including the torture and mass murder of school children, who were allegedly JVP supporters, was carried out by the state. In one case, security forces allegedly opened fire on a rally convened by the JVP on 28 July 1989, killing 129 people.

=== Methods of killing ===
Multiple violent ways of murder was reported to media, throughout the insurgency. The practice of Necklacing was at its peak in the country since the late 1970s. Many alleged supporters of the JVP were killed on the streets with the message tagged in their heads "This is what happens when you join the JVP". Anyone who spoke out against the police was sentenced to death and was killed with methods similar to what the JVP used.

=== Other Sinhalese nationalists ===
A vigilante group named Deshapremi Sinhala Tharuna Peramuna (English: Patriotic Sinhala Youth Front) was formed around 1989. The group used the infamous slogan "Ape ekata thopee dolahak" (transl. Twelve of Yours, for that one of us). Soon it emerged in bloody combat against the Patriotic People's Front. One death threat issued by the group read:

Dear Grandfather/Grandmother/Mother/Sister, we know that your son/brother/husband is engaged in brutal murder under the pretence of patriotism. Your son/brother/husband, the so-called patriot, has cruelly taken the lives of mothers like you, of sisters, of innocent little children. In addition he has started killing the family members of the heroic Sinhalese soldiers who fought with the Tamil Tigers and sacrificed their lives, in order to protect the motherland. "It is not amongst us, ourselves, the Sinhalese people, that your son/brother/husband has launched the conflict in the name of patriotism? Is it then right that you, the wife/mother/sister of this person who engages in human murder of children should be free to live? Is it not justified to put you to death? From this moment, you and all your family members must be ready to die. May you attain peace in the afterlife! – Patriotic Sinhala Youth Front.

== Internal conflict post-insurrection ==
Government forces attached to Operation Combine captured JVP leader Rohana Wijeweera in Ulapane and brought him to Colombo, where the government claimed on 13 November 1989 that Wijeweera was shot and killed. Although the Government won a decisive military victory there were credible accusations of brutality and extrajudicial killings.

On 27 December 1989, a special police team led by SSP Lionel Gunathilake arrested Saman Piyasiri Fernando along with his mother and fiancé at Koswatte, Nawala. Lalith Wijerathna, Upali Jayaweera, Ranjitham Gunaratnam, Gamini Wijegunasekara, and Shantha Bandara tried to regroup following these events, but government forces managed to capture them and subsequently killed them in December 1989. The leadership of the JVP was transferred to Somawansa Amarasinghe. It is believed that Lalith Wijerathna was captured sometime later in Colombo by a special police team from Kandy in either late December 1989 or early January 1990. When the government reported the deaths of all of the major leaders of the insurgent party, over 15,000 troops surrendered and gave up their arms. Achieving a decisive military victory over the JVP, the government forced the party to return to democratic and nonviolent politics under the leadership of Somawansa Amarasinghe.

Some sectors of the JVP opposed the peace deal and urged remaining insurgents to continue fighting. The secondary wings of the JVP continued to fight under the leadership of D.M. Ananda. However, after his death, the party lost a majority of its supporters and was no longer able to continue its insurrection.

== Fatalities ==
A European delegation estimated the total death toll to be 60,000, while other estimates have placed the death toll at 35,000. For genocide studies, it was an example of politicide that happened in a democratic regime, and resulted in the killing of at least 13,000 and 30,000 JVP members and its alleged supporters.

=== Killings by group ===
- DJV killed around 6,000 people who were mostly police or armed forces. It also killed 41 Buddhist Monks and 2 Christian Clergy. However, only the killings that happened between 1988 and 1989 are counted by investigators
- A group named Draa killed 26 Indian soldiers
- The PRRA and SRRA killed around 1,000 people
- Ukussa paramilitary killed 80–100 people in the Kandy massacre and 14–20 people in the Peradeniya massacre
- The Black Cat group killed 300 members of the CPSL and a number of people in the Eppawela attack

=== United Nations research ===
Three members of the Working Group on Enforced or Involuntary Disappearances (WGEID) of the United Nations Commission on Human Rights visited Sri Lanka from 7 to 17 October 1991 and from 5 to 15 October 1992 at the invitation of the Sri Lankan government. Prior to the 1992 visit, the WGEID had attributed 4,932 cases of "disappearances" to the Government of Sri Lanka and had received reports from various reliable sources about approximately 9,000 cases that had not been processed. The WGEID considers only cases of "disappearances" in which the government is involved; thus, although the WGEID acknowledged it received information about people who disappeared at the hands of the JVP and the LTTE, it could not consider those cases in its report. The WGEID reported its findings to the Commission in February 1993, issuing a series of recommendations, including one that the PCIIRP expand its mandate to investigate the thousands of cases reported prior to its establishment.

=== Calls for further investigations ===
International jurist Neelan Thiruchelvam, in a speech at the ICES-Colombo, indicated that the appropriate investigations into the disappearances of civilians, including many children in the Sathurukondan, Eastern University, Mylanthanai and the mass murder and burial of school children at Sooriyakanda, were being hampered by the adoption of emergency regulations, which were contributing to a climate of impunity. He called for the partial, if not complete, revocation of emergency regulation so that an impartial inquiry into these incidents could take place. These attempts also failed and Thiruchelvam was later assassinated by the LTTE.

== Aftermath ==
By 1991, the JVP still existed as a pressure group or an organization regardless of the government operations to stop its activity. Following the insurrection, the JVP was relaunched and participated in electoral politics. At the parliamentary elections held on 2 April 2004, the party was part of the United People's Freedom Alliance that won 45.6% of the popular vote and 105 out of 225 seats. As the second partner in this alliance it once again became part of the government. It also supported the winning candidate Mahinda Rajapaksa in the 2005 parliamentary election. Along with the UNP it supported General Sarath Fonseka in the 2010 presidential election.

== In popular media ==
A documentary film of the second JVP insurgency titled Udugan Yamaya was released in 2006. It was screened in The Times London film festival that same year.

A movie based on Wijeweera's backstory called Ginnen Upan Seethala was released in 2017 featuring many of the events that took place between 1977 and 1987.

Tom Clancy's Ghost Recon Predator is loosely based on the insurgencies of Sri Lanka. It features combat with a group named 'People's Action Front' which is a reference to the 'People's Liberation Front'.

== Leaders of the insurrection ==
After the ban, JVP was reorganized in April 1984 and its pre-1983 members in the Politburo were Wijeweera, Gamanayake, Sumith Athukorala, Piyadasa Ranasinghe and Wanasinghe. In the same year, Galappaththi, Shantha Bandara, Saman Piyasiri, Somawansa Amarasinghe, D. M. Ananda were included. Later, during the Second insurrection, H. B. Herath, P. R. B. Wimalarathna and Lalith Wijerathna also joined. Accordingly, out of the 13 main leaders of the 2nd JVP uprising, 8 were involved in the April 1971 uprising. Also, four of them were university graduates.

13 Politburo Leaders during 1987 insurrection
Name	Date of birth	Post of JVP	Spouse (no. of children)	Education	Date of death
Rohana Wijeweera	14 July 1943	Leader	Chithrangani Fernando (06)	Dharmasoka College, Ambalangoda	13 November 1989
Upatissa Gamanayake	17 October 1948	Chief Secretary	S. Karunawathi (02)	Ganthalawala Maha Vidyalaya	13 November 1989
Sumith Athukorala	7 May 1949	Administrative & Finance Secretary	Sujatha Wijenayake (01)	Weeraketiya Maha Vidyalaya	3 May 1988
Piyadasa Ranasinghe	1946	Organizing Secretary	Seelawathi Senasinghe (01)	Weeraketiya Maha Vidyalaya	15 November 1989
Gunaratne Wanasinghe	1948	Headquarters Coordinator	Wimala Wanasinghe (01)	Keenadeniya Maha Vidyalaya	15 November 1989
Nandathilaka Galappaththi	2 February 1949	Educational Secretary	Tamara Ranjani (01)	Debarawewa Maha Vidyalaya	10 September 1989
Shantha Bandara	3 September 1954	Publicity Secretary & Youth Leader	Indu Kanthiratne (01)	Trinity College, Kandy; Government Science College, Matale	6 January 1990
Saman Piyasiri Fernando	23 March 1958	Military Wing Leader	Was about to get engaged to Indrani	Galahiriyawa Central College	29 December 1989
Somawansa Amarasinghe	5 June 1943	International network, Human rights & Intellectual property Coordinator	Pamara Kumari Herath (01)	Kalutara Vidyalaya	15 June 2016
D. M. Ananda	2 February 1957	Student, Bhikku & Women's wing Leader	—	Ratmale Rathanasena Pirivena	15 November 1989
H. B. Herath	24 June 1954	Regional Political & Military Wing Leader	Was about to get engaged	Medawachchiya Maha Vidyalaya	13 November 1989
P. R. B. Wimalarathna	4 May 1946	Union Leader	Kamani Jayasekara (03)	Vidyaloka Vidyalaya, Trinco	29 September 1989
Lalith Wijerathna	1 January 1958	Regional Political & Military Wing Leader	Was about to get engaged to Mangala Herath	Hunumulla Central College	6 January 1990

== See also ==
- Easter Sunday Raid
- Naxalite-Maoist insurgency
- 2019 Sri Lanka Easter bombings
- Ceylonese protests against the Vietnam War
- Ceylon Communist Party (Maoist)
- Jathika Nidahas Peramuna
- Foreign relations of North Korea
- Cocos Island Mutiny
- List of attacks on civilians attributed to the Janatha Vimukthi Peramuna
- List of attacks on civilians attributed to Sri Lankan government forces

== Bibliography ==
=== Books ===
- Gunasekara, Prinse (1998). A lost generation: Sri Lanka in Crisis. S. Godage & Brothers. ISBN 955-202-82-64.
- Guneratne, Rohan (1990). Sri Lanka, a Lost Revolution?: The Inside Story of the JVP. Sri Lanka: Institute of Fundamental Studies. Archived from the original on 22 August 2005.
- Guneratne, Rohan (1993). Indian Intervention in Sri Lanka. South Asian Network on Conflict Research. ISBN 955-95199-0-5. Archived from the original on 28 February 2006.
- Dissanayake, T. (2002). War or Peace in Sri Lanka. ISBN 9555720029.
- Kadian, Rajesh (1990). India's Sri Lanka Fiasco: Peace Keepers at War. Vision Books. ISBN 978-81-7094-063-0.
- Nubin, Walter (2002). Sri Lanka: Current Issues and Historical Background. Nova publications.

=== Accounts ===
- Chandraprema, C.A. (1991). The Years of Terror. Sri Lanka: Lake House Bookshop. ISBN 9559029037.
- Pratap, Anita. The Island of Blood: Sri Lanka. India.

=== Further reading ===
- Rebellion, Repression and the Struggle for Justice in Sri Lanka : The Lionel Bopage Story by Michael Colin Cooke, Agahas Publishers, Colombo (2011) ISBN 978-0300051308
- Gunaratna, Rohan. (1998). Sri Lanka's Ethnic Crisis and National Security, Colombo: South Asian Network on Conflict Research. ISBN 955-8093-00-9
- An Exceptional Collapse of the Rule of Law: Told Through Stories by Families of the Disappeared in Sri Lanka, Edited by Shyamali Puvimanasinghe, researched by Moon Jeong Ho and Bruce Van Voorhuis, Published by the Asian Legal Resource Center and Asian Human rights Commission (Hong Kong) and the 'Families of the Disappeared' (Sri Lanka), 2004.
- Holt, John. The Sri Lanka Reader: History, Culture, Politics. Duke University Press, 2011 WR.
- Warfare and armed conflicts : a statistical encyclopedia of casualty and other figures, 1492–2015, Page XV.
