= D. M. Ananda =

Sri Lankan politician and JVP Education secretary (1957–1989)

D. M. Ananda ඩී. ඇම්. ආනන්ද

University Leader of Janatha Vimukthi Peramuna
- In office 1978–1989
- Leader: Rohana Wijeweera

Personal details
- Born: Dissanayake Mudiyanselage Nandasena; 2 February 1957 Wariyapola, Sri Lanka
- Died: 15 November 1989 (aged 32) Mattegoda, Sri Lanka
- Party: Janatha Vimukthi Peramuna
- Education: Ratmale Rathanasena Pirivena
- Alma mater: University of Peradeniya
- Occupation: Politician, Revolutionary
- Nickname(s): Amal Mahattaya, Minuwangate Ananda Thero

Dissanayake Mudiyanselage Nandasena (2 February 1957 – 15 November 1989: Sinhala: ඩී. ඇම්. ආනන්ද: nom de guerre: Amal Mahattaya), popularly known as D. M. Ananda, was a senior leader and a politburo member of the Janatha Vimukthi Peramuna (JVP) during the notorious 1987–1989 insurrection. He was the third unofficial leader of the JVP's second insurgency after Wijeweera and Gamanayake. Ananda was captured by Sri Lankan government forces in 1989 and apparently died in captivity.

== Early life ==
He was born on 2 February 1957 at Minuwangate village near Rindibendiella in Wariyapola, Sri Lanka. His father, a chena farmer, also had some knowledge of indigenous fracture medicine. He had two siblings. As a child, he was raised by his grandmother due to the separation of his parents. At the age of 12, he was ordained as Minuwangate Ananda Thero on May 3, 1968 at the Demataluwa Pothgul Vihara by his Chief Guru Thero, Ven. Rekawa Jinaratana Thero, the Chief Justice of the North Western Province, who was the Chief Incumbent of the Pothgul Viharaya until 2020.

He was educated at the Ratmale Rathanasena Pirivena. Then he entered the University of Peradeniya on October 17, 1977 to pursue a degree in Fine Arts.

== Political career ==
=== Student leader ===
Ananda Thera, who had no JVP affiliation at the time of his arrival at the university, was recruited by Shantha Bandara. Ananda Thera first attended JVP classes in March 1978 at the Peradeniya University Sangharama along with eight other university clergy students. The leader who coordinated the JVP monks in Peradeniya at that time was Ven. Palukadawala Premananda Thero of Dalupitiya, Mahara. The JVP held a two-week national educational camp in Harispattuwa in June 1978 and Ananda Thera also joined it. Among those who gave lectures for the camp were Shantha Bandara, Vass Tillekeratne, Daya Wanniarachchi and Rohana Wijeweera came to the lecture on the last day. During his university days, D.M. Ananda was a student activist. They and others have been working since 1978 to build the student movement. As a result, the JVP Socialist Students' Union gained almost all control of the Peradeniya University Student Council in 1979/80. He was President of the Socialist Students Union, the student arm of the JVP, and the Secretary of the Inter University Students' Federation (IUSF).

At the request of the JVP, Ananda Thera removed his robes and became D. M. Nandasena. He was later named Aruna or Amal or Alahakoon or Adhikari. Although Ananda sat for the final examination of the Faculty of Arts at the University of Peradeniya in August 1981 and passed with a special degree in Political Science, he chose the full-time politics of the JVP. He came into prominence in 1981 during the countrywide protest against the government White Paper on Educational Reforms. As the chief organizer of this campaign, which was largely steered by the JVP, thousands of university and other students demonstrated on the streets. As a result of this campaign, the JVP drew radical youths to the movement. Ananda was recognized as a capable organizer. He became the key link between the JVP and the university activists. They played the most vital part of the 1987-89 insurrection and many of the party's leaders were students or former students.

The first of these protests was the massive agitation that took place on January 20, 1981 in Galle Modara, encircling the old Parliament premises. Following the protest, a JVP-led rally was held on February 26, 1981 at Hyde Park. Meanwhile, Wijeweera also addressed the gathering and asked them to come to the university and see who has the student power. In his speech, Ananda also challenged the traditional left parties.

=== Rise in the party ===
Ananda was described by the JVP Kandy District Organization in 1983 as an extremist activist. The reason for this was the appointment of the Acting Vice Chancellor Prof. Dias as a hostage on the fifth day during the deadly fast conducted by students of Peradeniya University in 1983. The JVP decided to continue the student fast as a mass protest with the support of the surrounding villages. However, in violation of that agreement, Prof. Dias was taken hostage under the invisible leadership of Ananda. The JVP Kandy District Committee did not approve of the decision of Ananda to make the Vice Chancellor a hostage and strongly advised Ananda not to act arbitrarily. In the meantime, when Ananda's name was proposed to the JVP Central Committee in early 1983, the Kandy District Committee had unanimously rejected it.

Ananda, who was appointed to the Central Committee at the end of 1983 after the banning of the JVP, joined the Politburo in late 1984. After the banning of the JVP, he also served as the Matara, Kalutara and Colombo District Organizers. By 1985, some of the top leaders had left the party including Lionel Bopage, Daya Wanniarachchi, Vaas Thilakaratne and Mahinda Pathirana. As a result, young leaders, such as D.M. Ananda, H.B. Herath and Shantha Bandara had the opportunity to move up. During the 1987–1989 JVP insurrection, he was also the leader of the student, bhikku and women's wing and the military leader in the Western and Sabaragamuwa Provinces. He was also in charge of the technical division that manufactured bombs and mines. Ananda was also instrumental in the activities of the cultural section including the Ranahanda radio conducted by the JVP. He was also the third unofficial leader of the second insurrection.

The anti-democratic activities of the government, the threats posed by the Tamil separatists, the austerity measures taken by the university students on a number of issues including the austerity of free education were instrumental in stabilizing the JVP among the students and the strategic leadership of Ananda. To resolve the forcible bus strike held by the SLTB United Front from June 12 to July 13, 1989, Ananda also went to Sucharitha and conducted discussions with president Ranasinghe Premadasa. In addition, he also maintained contacts with Gurujit Singh and Hardeep Puri, both official and unofficial officials of the Indian Embassy in Sri Lanka. The power of the JVP mass organizations throughout the country was vested in Ananda and the armed forces of the JVP throughout the country were under Saman Piyasiri Fernando. Meanwhile since August 1988, Wijeweera had animosity towards Saman and Ananda in the Politburo.

Kota Gamini who worked at the Milson lathe on Shavia Mawatha in Ratnapura, joined the JVP in 1980 and continued to be an activist after being banned by the JVP. Under the supervision of Ananda, the Milson site was secretly used as a rebels' quarry and even produced the barrel of a T-56 rifle. After the arrest of Jayaratne, a JVP rebel who had been constantly bringing messages to the Milson lathe and a resident of Welimaluwa, Ratnapura, was arrested. Through his confessions, involvement of Ananda to the lathe was revealed by The Rapid Deployment Force (RDF). Jayaratne also told the security forces that Ananda frequently visit Kandurupokuna to meet one of his friends. Later another JVP rebel, Kandurupokuna was caught by the army in January 1989 and according to information received from Kandurupokuna, Ananda's driver Amaratunga was the first to be arrested and Anura Priyankara alias Bandulal, a father of one born in Weligama was arrested second.

=== Final days ===
After being tortured, they also revealed the information, allowing Ananda to flee three days later. But Ananda did not receive the message and on October 28, 1989, he was arrested at a military post near Ratnapura while riding a motorbike driven by another person to his Ratnapura lodge. After the arrest, Ananda was brought to the Mattegoda camp and later to the Yataro Cafeteria camp, tortured in each of these camps. Then he was detained in the dungeon run by the Law Faculty of the University of Colombo. Ananda was facilitated more than the other suspects during interrogations where Lieutenant Madawala and Captain Sirishantha also used Marxist-translated translations to win Ananda's mind. 01

On behalf of the JVP Politburo to release the arrested Ananda, H. B. Herath had met Minister Saumyamoorthy Thondaman on November 8, 1989 and made a request to President Premadasa through him. However, there was no positive response from the President and Ananda was assassinated on November 15, 1989 in Mattegoda after the assassination of Wijeweera. It is widely believed that Wijeweera was arrested by a revelation made by Ananda. But, it is an opinion popularized by security intelligence on the advice of foreign intelligence services.

== In popular media ==
The biographical film of Rohana Wijeweera's late life titled Ginnen Upan Seethala was released in 2018. The film was directed by Anurudha Jayasinghe and actor Narada Thotagamuwa played Ananda's role.
