= Gunaratne Wanasinghe =

Sri Lankan politician and JVP Publicity Head (1948–1989)

Gunaratne Wanasinghe ගුණරත්න වනසිංහ

Head of Publicity Division of Janatha Vimukthi Peramuna
- In office 1981–1989
- Leader: Rohana Wijeweera

Personal details
- Born: Wanasinghe Arachchilage Don Gunaratne; 1948 Ambepussa, Sri Lanka
- Died: 15 November 1989 (aged 40) Colombo, Sri Lanka
- Party: Janatha Vimukthi Peramuna
- Spouse: Wimala Wanasinghe
- Children: 1
- Education: Keenadeniya Maha Vidyalaya
- Occupation: Politician, journalist, principal

Wanasinghe Arachchilage Don Gunaratne (1948 – 15 November 1989: Sinhala: ගුණරත්න වනසිංහ), popularly known as Gunaratne Wanasinghe, was a Sri Lankan political activist who was killed by army forces. He was the Head of Publicity Division and a member of the JVP party in the period 1970–1989. He was also known as Sena, Vane, Gune Aiya, Gunadasa.

== Family background and early life ==
He was born in 1948 in Ambepussa, Sri Lanka as the youngest child in a family with five siblings. His father was a principal and the mother was a teacher. He was educated at Ambepussa Keenadeniya Maha Vidyalaya.

Gunaratne was married to Wimala alias Sriyani. She was also a full time member of the JVP Matara District. The couple had one son where they lived in Imbulgoda, Gampaha for some time as a sewing family. After the defeat of JVP, Wimala and son went to Switzerland to seek political asylum with the help of former JVP member Mahinda Kurukulasuriya. She later immigrated to France six months later without a B-permit to live in Switzerland. With the help of JVP leader Somawansa Amarasinghe, Wimala then joined the restaurant in France.

== Political career ==
During his Diploma in Technical College in 1970, he joined the JVP full time. During the 1971 JVP insurrection, Gunaratne worked as the organizer of the Puttalam District. Before the insurrection, he conducted JVP classes in the jungles on the banks of the Deduru Oya. On April 5, 1971, a group of about 25 people, including Senaratne Silva, Wanasinghe led an attack to the Chilaw police. Then he was arrest for organizing riots and released in the mid 1970s. Then he became the principal of a small school and temporarily quit from politics.

However, in 1979, he entered active politics again. He also served as the head of the JVP's propaganda wing for a long time. During the 1987–1989 JVP insurrection, Gunaratne was in charge of coordinating the JVP headquarters. Meanwhile, on 4 June 1981, he contested the Development Council elections as the JVP organizer for Mirigama and elected as a member of the Gampaha District JVP Development Council. In 1984, he joined the JVP Politburo earlier consisted with seven members where Wijeweera named as 'Magnificent Seven': Rohana Wijeweera, Upatissa Gamanayake, Sumith Athukorala, Piyadasa Ranasinghe, Gunaratne Wanasinghe, Somawansa Amarasinghe and Nandathilaka Galappaththi. The politburo later increased uptp 12 more members in late 1984. At the same time, he served as the Secretary of the Education Committee. Due to this post, he frequently visited Shakthi Press, JVP headquarters at 14 Cyril C. Perera Mawatha, and the office at No. 73, Sri Dharmarama Road, Dematagoda.

While printing the book in a small printing press kept secretly in a house in Hokandara, in late March 1985, the police seized the printed pages of the book and some parts of the manuscript in the printing press alleging that the place also helped for LTTE printing as well. During the raid, Gunaratne was arrested but soon released. However, in September 1985, he published the 315-page book titled Wijeweerage Eelam Aragalayata Visaduma Kumakda. He is also the editor of JVP official Sinhala tabloid, Niyamuwa.

In his last years, Gunaratne was the treasurer of JVP and lived in Kottawa with several illnesses as he could not participate for the politburo meetings. Then, he was arrested on November 5, 1989, in Dematagoda after the information received by a spy. Then he was held at a detention center at the University of Kelaniya. He was later brought to the Joint Operations Center on 13 November and the Colombo Law Faculty torture chamber and tortured. Finally, he was assassinated on 15 November 1989.

== Bibliography ==
- Rohan Gunarathna (1990), Sri Lanka, a lost revolution, Institute of fundamental studies ISBN 955-26-0004-9
- C. A. Chandraprema (1991) Sri Lanka, The Years of Terror- The JVP insurrection 1987-1989, Lake House Bookshop, ISBN 955-9029-03-7
