= Operation Combine =

Operation launched by the Sri Lankan army in order to kill rebel leaders

Counterinsurgency during the second JVP insurrection
- Part of 1987-1989 JVP insurrection
Date	1989-1990
Location	Sri Lanka
Result	Sri Lankan Government captures and executes major rebel leaders

Belligerents
Sri Lanka	(no border) JVP

Commanders and leaders
(Sri Lanka) Ranjan Wijeratne	(no border) Rohana Wijeweera (executed) (no border) Saman Piyasiri Fernando (executed) (no border) Upatissa Gamanayake (executed)

Operation Combine
- Allegiance: Sri Lanka Armed Forces
- Role: Ground warfare

Commanders
- Colonel of the Regiment: Janaka Perera
- Founder: Ranjan Wijeratne

Operation Combine ( Ops Combine) was a special operation established by the Sri Lanka Army from 4 August 1989 to February 1990 as counterinsurgency operation with support of the Sri Lanka Police against the Janatha Vimukthi Peramuna (JVP) which had launched a its second insurgency in 1987.

== Background ==
By the late 80s the Sri Lankan Government was at conflict with various Tamil and Sinhalese militant groups. The Tamil militants were active in the North-Eastern province and the Sinhalese militants were active in the South-Western province. The Janatha Vimukthi Peramuna was the most significant threat to the government as of 1989 due to their attempts to topple the government.

The JVP in 1987 bombed the Sri Lankan parliament as an attempt to topple the government. By the 1988 the insurgency came to peak and everyday, over 50 bodies were discovered on the streets.

== Operation ==
Under orders from the newly elected President Ranasinghe Premadasa, Operation Combine was established by Lieutenant Colonel Ranjan Wijeratne, State Minister of Defence on 4 August 1989 at the height of the 1987–89 JVP Insurrection in the south of Sri Lanka. The Special Task Force was headed by Major General Cecil Waidyaratne, Army Chief of Staff with Brigadier Lakshman Algama serving as his deputy and established its headquarters at Havelock Town. The Special Task Force carried out intelligence gathering and direct action operations against the JVP, targeting its leadership. It was successful in tracking down and eliminating much of the JVP leadership which culminated with the capture and death of its leader Rohana Wijeweera on 12 November 1989.

On 27 December 1989, a special police team, led by SSP Lionel Gunathilake, arrested Saman Piyasiri Fernando along with his mother and fiancé; who was a sister of JVP politburo member Daya Wanniarachchi, at Koswatte, Nawala, at a rented house owned by Mark Antony Fernando, who works at SLBC. According to the police sources, the number of military books found inside the house and some of them are not found in Sri Lankan military libraries. Lalith Wijerathna, Upali Jayaweera, Ranjitham Gunaratnam, Gamini Wijegunasekara and Shantha Bandara tried to regroup. However, the government forces managed to capture them and subsequently killed them in December 1989. The leadership of the JVP was transferred to Lalith Wijerathna. It is believed that Wijerathna was captured in Colombo by a special police team from Kandy either late December 1989 or early January 1990. At a later date in January he was allegedly executed by his captors in Kandy in the last days of Operation Combine.

== End of the operation ==
The Sri Lankan government media released on 29 December 1989, as "the leader of the JVP military wing killed along with four other cadres due to the cross fire between security forces and the JVP at their military wing headquarters, a farm located at Hedigama-Suwarapola, Piliyandala". Following the death of Wijeweera and other key leaders, the JVP insurrection collapsed and Operation Combine was terminated in February 1990 by Ranjan Wijeratne.

== Notable members ==
- MP Ranjan Wijeratne - Minister of defense, Sri Lanka
- Colonel Janaka Perera - Special operations, Operation Combine
- Major General Cecil Waidyaratne
- Brigadier Lakshman Algama
