= Peoples Revolutionary Red Army =

Former paramilitary organisation in Sri Lanka

- ජනතාවගේ විප්ලවවාදී රතු හමුදාව
- Dates active: 1988–1990
- Country: Sri Lanka
- Allegiance: United National Party (Alleged), Sri Lanka Mahajana Pakshaya (Alleged)
- Ideology: Far-Left
- Status: Dissolved
- Wars: 1987–1989 JVP insurrection

The Peoples Revolutionary Red Army was a leftist paramilitary group which operated sometime between 1988 and 1990 during the height of the 1989 JVP insurrection.

Formed by mostly Sinhalese under the leadership of UNP affiliated politicians with links to the ISU (Independent Students Union), Sri Lanka Mahajana Pakshaya and the PLOTE. It was a part of numerous other paramilitary groups linked to the Sri Lankan government ostensibly to fight against and target the support base of the JVP, which drew mainly from the majority Sinhalese south.

== Activities ==
Like other paramilitaries such as the Black Cats and Eagles of the Central Hills, it was primarily involved in counter-insurgency against the JVP. They would target suspected JVP sympathisers (both alleged and real) via abductions and killings. Those not killed would be threatened with violence such as an Amnesty International Team in 1991 and during the 1989 election where they threatened violence against anyone suspected of boycotting.

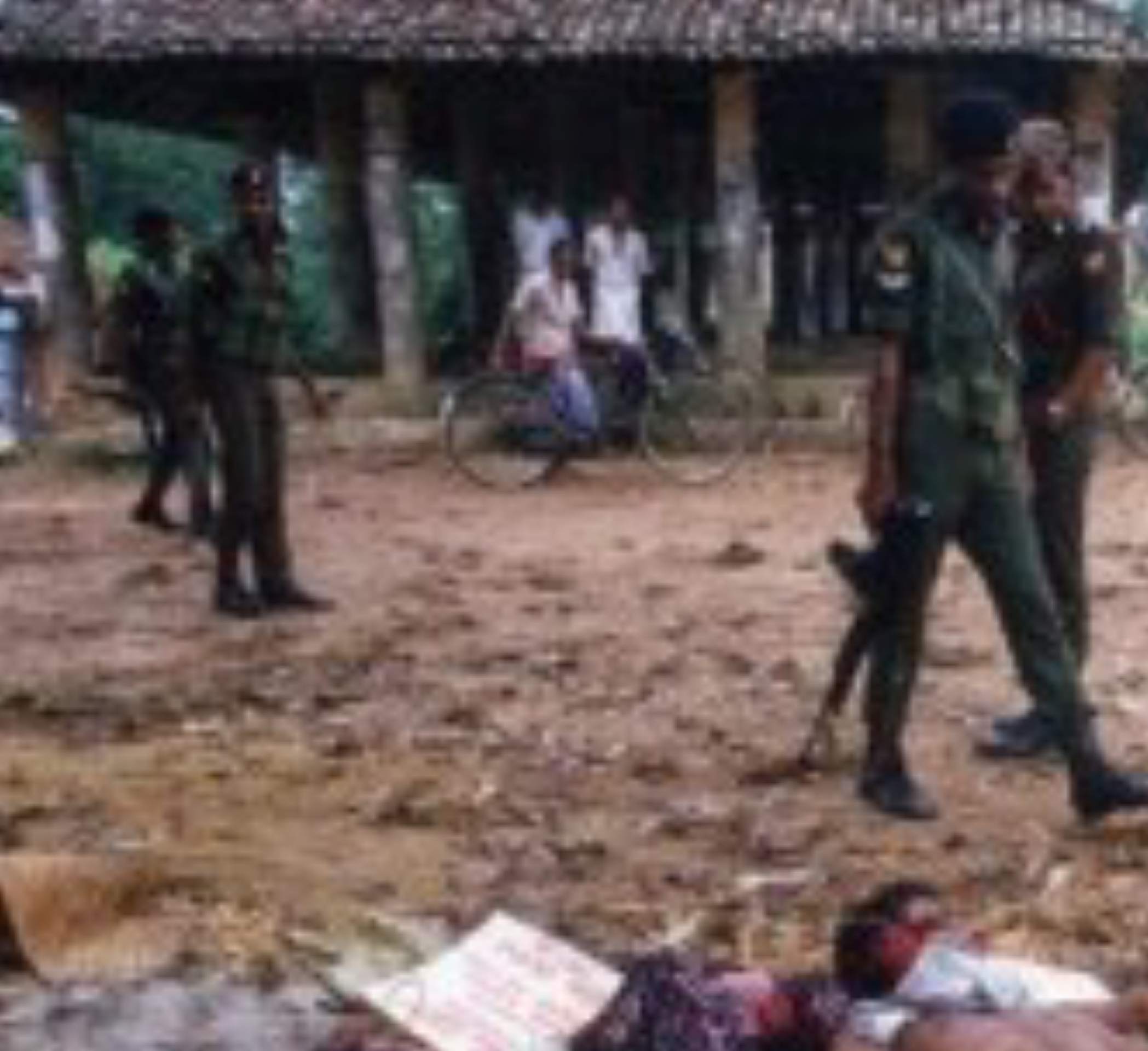
Aftermath of a PRRA attack on suspected JVP sympathisers in Tihagoda, sign reads "This is the punishment for followers of the JVP, signed by the PRRA"

=== Disestablishment ===
By 1990 the group ceased operations as the JVP insurgency was suppressed by Operation Combine. Though no officials in the Sri Lankan government or the PRRA have being tried for the numerous crimes committed by the PRRA or the numerous other paramilitary organisations that worked with the Sri Lankan government between the 1980s to late 2000s.
