= Welikada prison riot =

Welikada prison is in Colombo, Sri Lanka. Welikada prison riot may also refer to:

- Welikada prison riot (1983), a riot at the prison in July 1983
- Welikada prison riot (1988), an uprising in the prison on 13 December 1988
- Welikada prison riot (2012), a riot at the prison on 9 November 2012
