= P. R. B. Wimalarathna =

Sri Lankan politician and military leader of JVP (1958–1990)

- පී. ආර්. බී. විමලරත්න

Member of Central Committee of Janatha Vimukthi Peramuna
- In office 1983–1989
- Leader: Rohana Wijeweera

Personal details
- Born: Polwatta Rathu Baduge Wimalaratne; 4 May 1946 Trincomalee, British Ceylon
- Died: 19 September 1989 (aged 43) Battaramulla, Sri Lanka
- Party: Janatha Vimukthi Peramuna
- Spouse: Kamani Jayasekara (1978-1989)
- Children: 3
- Education: Trincomalee Junior College; Abhayapura Maha Vidyalaya
- Alma mater: Hingurakgoda Teacher Training College
- Occupation: Politician, teacher

Polwatta Rathu Baduge Wimalaratne (4 May 1946 – 19 September 1989: Sinhala: ලලිත් විජේරත්න), popularly known as P. R. B. Wimalarathna, was a Sri Lankan politician and militant leader. He was a member of the JVP party in the period 1978–1989 and leader of the National Center for Workers' Struggle. He was also known as Wimal Ranbadu, Trinco Wimal, Leslie and Batty Aiya.

== Family background ==
Wimalaratne's grandfather was Polwatta Rathubaduge Davith Singho from Gandara, Matara. His Grandmother was Punchihewage Punchi Nona. The couple had 6 children, where four of them were sons. In 1939, Davith settled in Trincomalee with his family. Wimalarathna's father Daniel Silva was born 7 March 1926 as the third child of Davith Singho and Punchi Nona. Wimalarathna's mother Manikku Baduge Kusumawathi was born on 29 February 1929. Daniel Silva and Kusumawathi were niece and nephew where they married on 4 October 1944. The couple had 12 children: 10 boys: Wimalaratne, Ariyaratne, Premaratne, Sumathipala, Hemapala, Jagath, Gamini, Kithsiri, Kapila, Anura Kumara; and two daughters: Swarnalatha, and Subashini. Wimalaratne's mother died on 7 February 2005 at the age of 79.

Wimalaratne was born on 4 May 1946 in Polwatta, Trincomalee, Sri Lanka as the eldest child in the family. He was educated at Trincomalee Junior College (now Rajakeeya Vidyaloka National School) and Abhayapura Maha Vidyalaya. He passed the GCE Ordinary Level Examination in 1962 and the GCE Advanced Level Examination in 1965 with good distinctions.

Wimalaratne's brother Premaratne was about 18 years old at the time and an activist in the group that attacked the Horowpothana police. Premaratne was later arrested by the Horowpathana Police on 16 April 1971 while on his way to a house in the Morawewa Govi Janapadaya. Later, Premaratne's legs were tied to a jeep and dragged off the road, killing him. The other brother, 17-year-old Sumathipala, was arrested on 17 April 1971, and killed along with 16 other rebels near the Yan-Oya Bridge, the border between Trincomalee and Anuradhapura districts.

On 11 July 1978, he married Kamani Jayasekara, a JVP member born in Galle in 1947 and lived in Trincomalee, Kinniya. Her father Don James Jayasekara was a former naval officer. Kamani's mother was Piyaseeli Kandamby. Kamani was the 4th child in a family of 9 siblings: 5 brothers and three sisters. One of Kamani 's brothers, D. Kumarasiri Jayasekara alias Sudu Aiya had joined the JVP in 1969. Another brother, Dayasiri, later became the JVP Nuwara Eliya district secretary and was assassinated in 1989. Another brother, Ranjith, served as the JVP's Trincomalee district secretary before the party's ban, later became the owner of the Ocean Hotel in Trincomalee and later died in an accident. At the time of the murder of Wimalaratne and Kamani, their three children were very young. The two daughters were Achala Madhavi and Dinushka Subandhani and the youngest child was Janith Prabhashana.

== Political career ==
After that, he submitted an application for government teaching appointments and sat for the interview held on 8 March 1967, through the Sinhala medium. He was selected from the Trincomalee district and first appointment was in 1969 to Abhayapura Maha Vidyalaya as a Sinhala teacher. Wimala Gunaratne, who accompanied Wimalaratne went to the Director of Education of the District Education Office, and Wimalaratne was re-appointed as a teacher at Mihindupura School. In 1968, Wimalaratne joins the JVP through the teacher through H. N. Fernando at the Trincomalee College. Then he became an active member of the Trincomalee Group led by H. N. Fernando.

He passed the competitive examination and entered the Hingurakgoda Teacher Training College as a teacher student in 1969 for a two-year full time training. Meanwhile, he become an enthusiastic member of the JVP at that time, had even come to the Kalutara Teachers' Training College to conduct JVP classes. On weekends and holidays, he used to visit the Chintamani Hotel (now Bandula Hotel) in front of the Trincomalee Clock Tower for political conversations. He later co-founded the Trincomalee Cultural Association called 'Peralikarayo' with a group of educated youth in the Trincomalee District. The play Ririyaka where the story, dialogue, lyrics and melody of the play was produced by Wimalaratne and staged on 17 and 18 October 1970 at 3 and 7 pm at Abhayapura Vidyalaya. Under his guidance, about 15 cultural discussions were organized in villages across the district. Wimalaratne's lyrics were also included in the 1978 JVP Liberation Song Concert.

After the completion of the teacher training course on 18 December 1970, Wimalaratne was appointed as an Assistant Teacher in the Ministry of Education with effect from 1 January 1971 and was attached to the Abhayapura College in Trincomalee. Wimalaratne was arrested at his home on 16 March 1971 by the Trincomalee Police on suspicion of involvement in the 1971 JVP insurrection and remanded in Anuradhapura. Arrested, he was produced before the Trincomalee Magistrate's Court every two weeks from 16 March 1971. On 18 April 1971, his father went to court but was not allowed to enter court. Due to a confrontation with Sergeant Banda with Wimalaratne's father at the court, later in the evening Sergeant Banda came home in a Morris Minor car, and his father was taken away to take a statement. His father was later tied up in a sack, tortured with chili smoke and tortured to death. The bodies of the other suspects were taken to the Nilaweli and cremated in the 'torture well' there.

After heard the death of his father and two brothers, Wimalaratne escaped from the Anuradhapura prison on 8 October 1972 with 31 JVP prisoners. Under the guise of the escape of 31 JVP prisoners, 108 ordinary prisoners including Maru Sira had escaped too. However, he was re-arrested and detained at the Magazine Prison, was transferred to the Jaffna Prison in 1974 after being caught digging a tunnel to escape with a group of prisoners. His appeal was accepted by the government and released. He was re-admitted to Mihindupura Maha Vidyalaya, Trincomalee for the post of Assistant Teacher. He was also a member of the JVP's first Central Committee established in 1978 after Wijeweera's release.

After the marriage. Wimalaratne lived in his Andamkulam house opposite the naval water supply in Trincomalee and went underground with the party ban. Later he lived with his wife and children in Galle, Battaramulla, Thalahena, Sapugaskanda and Athurugiriya. Under Anura's coordination, he also ran a confectionery business called 'Lina Thalaguli' distributors. Wimalaratne, who was for a time the District Secretary of the JVP in the Anuradhapura, Trincomalee, Kandy, Colombo and Galle districts, was the person who brought together the members of the Politburo and the Central Committee during the JVP's Second Rebellion. He was also the leader of the trade union movement during the 1987-1989 JVP insurgency as well as the leader of the National Center for the Struggle for Workers. In the meantime, he also served as the Political Divisional Secretary for Kandy, Colombo, Trincomalee and Galle Districts.

Wimal was again arrested on 18 September 1989 by the Avissawella Salawa Army Unit under the direction of Colonel Lionel Balagalla while returning to Colombo by bus from Badulla. He was later taken to the Isurupaya camp and tortured and killed. One month after Wimalaratne's arrest, on 13 October 1989, security forces in the Kaduwela area arrested Wimalaratne's wife Kamani while she was at her Athurugiriya home. Wimala alias Swarna, the wife of JVP Politburo member Gunaratne Wanasinghe, who was at the house, later handed over the three children to Kamani's family. It was also the only time a member of the JVP politburo and his wife were killed during the JVP's second insurrection.

== Bibliography ==
- Rohan Gunarathna (1990), Sri Lanka, a lost revolution, Institute of fundamental studies ISBN 955-26-0004-9
- C. A. Chandraprema (1991) Sri Lanka, The Years of Terror- The JVP insurrection 1987–1989, Lake House Bookshop, ISBN 955-9029-03-7
- S. Puvimanasinghe (2004), An Exceptional Collapse of the Rule of Law, Told through stories by families of the disappeared in Sri Lanka, Asian Human Rights Commission, ISBN 962-8161-06-7
