= Nandathilaka Galappaththi =

Sri Lankan politician and JVP Education secretary (1949–1989)

Nandathilaka Galappaththi නන්දතිලක ගලප්පත්ති

Education Secretary of Janatha Vimukthi Peramuna
- In office 1968–1989
- Leader: Rohana Wijeweera

Personal details
- Born: Nandathilaka Amadoru Galappaththi; 2 February 1949 Tissamaharamaya, Sri Lanka
- Died: 10 September 1989 (aged 40) Mattegoda, Sri Lanka
- Party: Janatha Vimukthi Peramuna
- Spouse: Tamara Ranjani Gamage
- Children: 1
- Education: Rubberwatta Vidyalaya, Hambantota; Debarawewa National School
- Alma mater: University of Sri Jayewardenepura
- Occupation: politician, journalist

Nandathilaka Amadoru Galappaththi Sinhala: නන්දතිලක ගලප්පත්ති; 2 February 1949 – 10 September 1989), was a Sri Lankan political activist who was killed by army forces. He was the Education Secretary and a member of the JVP party in the period 1970–1989. He was also known as Perera, Liyanage and Ari.

== Family background and early life ==
He was born on 2 February 1949 in Uduwila village in Tissamaharamaya, Sri Lanka as the fourth child in a family with five siblings. His father died when he was a child. He studied at Rubberwatta Vidyalaya, Hambantota (currently known as Medawalena Maha Vidyalaya) up to GCE Ordinary Level and Advanced Level at Debarawewa National School. He was the first student to enter the university after graduating from Rubberwatta Vidyalaya. Nandathilaka entered the University of Sri Jayewardenepura in 1967 as a graduate student at the then Faculty of Arts and left the university in 1970 as an Honorary Graduate. During his university life, his mother had a difficult life battle where she did many har activities such as cutting drains in coconut estates and preparing chillies to be taken to market in the morning.

Nandathilaka was married in July 1980 to Bamunusinghege Tamara Ranjani Gamage, who was born in 1954 in Wilpita, Akuressa. She was educated at Godapitiya Maha Vidyalaya, Akuressa. The couple has one son: Isuru Akalanka, who was born in January 1986. After Nandathilaka's death, the JVP facilitated the Galaha home to take care of the widow and child. Dandeniya Arachchige Karunawathie was also residing there at that time. Ranjani and her son left the Galaha house on November 12, 1989, after being raided by the security forces and went to a safe place where they were taken care of by their sister in Kandy. Ranjani's sister admitted Akalanka to Trinity College, Kandy and educated him. Ranjani also came to Colombo and worked at the Torrington Sub Post Office, Piliyandala, Kadawatha and many other places. Akalanka is a graduate of Sabaragamuwa University and currently resided in Canada to pursue a PhD.

== Political career ==
Instead of looking for the employment in the Assistant Government Agent's Service of the Government Civil Service, he became a full-time member of the JVP. He joined the JVP in 1968 and actively joined the 1971 JVP insurrection. After the uprising, he was imprisoned in a prison camp at the same university where he studied, and was released from Magazine Prison in 1976. Then he elected to the Central Committee in 1979 after released from the jail. He joined the Politburo after the JVP was banned. Prior to the banning of the JVP, he was in charge of JVP newspapers and publications, including Niyamuwa. He was also the head of its cultural wing, and was responsible for maintaining the Shakthi Press, which printed them. Initially, newspapers were registered under Kelly Senanayake's name and later changed to Somawansa Amarasinghe. Initially a fund of Rs. 100,000 was established to start the printing press and a coin tin business was launched throughout the country.

Before the ban of the JVP at the Kohilawatta Shakthi Press in July 1983, there were 27 full time members of the JVP. As soon as the JVP was banned on July 31, 1983, the Shakthi Press was sealed by the police on the same morning. At that time, there were 21 employees and Nandathilaka paid Rs. 150 each through Kamaladasa and instructed party members who were employees to go to their homes or shelters. At that time under Nandathilaka, Niyamuwa, the official newspaper of the JVP, was published weekly and the number of copies printed was 20,000. The newspaper Seenuwa has been published daily as a daily newspaper since June 11, 1983, with over 4,000 copies printed daily. The Tamil newspaper Sen Shakthi printed 5,000 copies a month. The English monthly Red Power has a circulation of 7,000 copies. The Socialist Workers' Union newspaper Rathu Lanka, Janatha Vimukthi and several other newspapers were printed there.

After the banning of the party, Rohana Wijeweera went to the forest and asked Nandathilaka to take the party's newspapers back to the people either through Ronio's statements. He responded swiftly and promptly, as Nandathilaka is known as one of the most high-ranking JVP leaders who has looked at everything fairly and critically. As a specialist in Sinhala language and literature, his song 'Sathi Pooja Daraseye Hiravi Mottakkiliye' was staged at the Vimukthi Gee concert. After the ban, the JVP's cultural and arts wing worked hard to unite artists and artists. It was under his leadership that the People's Art Center was replaced by the Creative Dialogue Group through the magazine Path Iruwa.

Nandathilaka, who was the Education Secretary during the 1987–1989 JVP insurrection, was the Political Secretary for the Badulla in 1987 and 1989 as well as Kegalle District when he was arrested in Kalutara in 1985. He was arrested by the Nuwara Eliya Police in 1987 while he was the Badulla District Secretary and was detained at the Badulla Prison. He was later rescued and abducted by the JVP in Haggala, Nuwara Eliya while being taken in a prison vehicle to be produced before the Nuwara Eliya Magistrate's Court. Matara was one of the districts that received the most attention after the JVP resumed its activities in 1984. Accordingly, the Matara, Galle, Ampara, Badulla and Moneragala districts were activated under political members Sumith Athukorala and Nandathilaka.

During a meeting of the Kegalle District Committee at Wagolla, Pinnawala, Rambukkana on Thursday, August 31, 1989, security forces cordoned off the area and arrested seven members of the District Committee, including Nandathilaka. He was later brought to the Wickramasinghe bungalow in Kegalle and to the Mattegoda army camp. As Nandathilaka is a political member, the security forces wanted to know Wijeweera's whereabouts. After being tortured and lengthy questions, he was assassinated as an undisputed revolutionary leader on September 10, 1989.

== Bibliography ==
- Rohan Gunarathna (1990), Sri Lanka, a lost revolution, Institute of fundamental studies ISBN 955-26-0004-9
- C. A. Chandraprema (1991) Sri Lanka, The Years of Terror- The JVP insurrection 1987-1989, Lake House Bookshop, ISBN 955-9029-03-7
