= Piyadasa Ranasinghe =

Sri Lankan politician and JVP secretary (1948–1989)

Piyadasa Ranasinghe පියදාස රණසිංහ

Organizing Secretary of Janatha Vimukthi Peramuna
- In office 1983–1989
- Leader: Rohana Wijeweera

Personal details
- Born: Devabandhanage Piyadasa; 4 April 1946 Walasmulla, Sri Lanka
- Died: 15 November 1989 (aged 43) Mattegoda, Sri Lanka
- Party: Janatha Vimukthi Peramuna
- Spouse: Seelavathi Senasinghe
- Children: 1
- Education: Weeraketiya Central College
- Occupation: Politician, teacher

Devabandhanage Piyadasa (4 April 1946 – 15 November 1989: Sinhala: පියදාස රණසිංහ), popularly known as Piyadasa Ranasinghe, was a Sri Lankan political activist who was killed by army forces. He was the organising secretary and a member of the JVP party in the period 1970–1989. He was also known as Dibba, Sudu Mama and Dunuwila.

== Family background and early life ==
He was born on 4 April 1946 in Pahalawatte of Warapitiya village in Walasmulla, Sri Lanka as the third child of the family with seven siblings. The father Devabandhu was a farmer by profession. His mother Wijesiri was a housewife. Piyadasa received his primary education at Egodabedda Maha Vidyalaya, Hambantota, and from Kiramba Dhammananda Maha Vidyalaya up to grade 8 and his higher education at Weeraketiya Central College. He was a hostel student at the school and was once the student leader of the hostel.

He was married to Seelavathi Senasinghe alias Sheela alias Sujatha. The couple had only son, Uvindu. Both of them are residing in Ududamana, Thihagoda, Matara by 2020.

== Political career ==
Ranasinghe served as the JVP organising secretary from 1983 until his death in 1989. Piyadasa joined the JVP as a GCE Advanced Level student, and became an active member during the 1971 JVP insurrection. He was later arrested in 1971 and transferred to Anuradhapura from the Kelaniya Vidyalankara University Camp and the Ridiyagama Outdoor Camp. Later, a group of JVP activists including Nandana Marasinghe raided the Anuradhapura prison on June 13, 1972, and rescued 32 JVP members including Piyadasa, Heenbanda Wanasinghe and Akuresse Francis. Although Piyadasa was charged with assaulting the Walasmulla police on April 71, he was acquitted and released in 1976.

Piyadasa was a talented lecturer who was called to educational camps. After free from the jail, he worked as a science and mathematics teacher at Kiramba Dhammananda Vidyalaya and later at Egodabedda Maha Vidyalaya. Police also banned a meeting he chaired on August 11, 1978, in Angunakolapelessa. He was elected to the JVP Central Committee in 1979 and later to the Politburo. During this period he resided in Kirama, Hambantota. Although he was also known by some as the unofficial internal secretary of the party, he did not hold such an official position in the JVP as a government registered political party. He also became the political leader of the Central Province during the 1987–1989 JVP insurrection and the finance secretary after the assassination of Sumith Athukorala. After the JVP was banned in July 1983, Piyadasa Ranasinghe was considered as the third leader of JVP after Wijeweera, Upatissa Gamanayake and Athukorala.

With the banning of the JVP in July 1983, Piyadasa and Athukorala, who were not involved in public politics, were elected to the Politburo. It was through the commitment of both of them, that the JVP was able to build a good network of organizations within a year by meeting undisclosed activists on district committees in person. Meanwhile, they were joined by a number of activists who were not open to the security forces. Piyadasa also coordinated relations between the JVP and Minister Ronnie de Mel which was an unofficial affair on behalf of Rohana Wijeweera. Even after the ban, there was an informal discussion between Rohana Wijeweera and Finance Minister Ronnie de Mel in the second week of February 1984 through Piyadasa's coordination. However this link was severed in 1986 with the outbreak of the second JVP insurrection. This was largely due to loyalty of Ronnie de Mel to the Indo-Lanka Accord, which was forcibly signed in July 1987.

== Final days ==
In his final days, Piyadasa lived in a house in Napana in the Gunnepana area of Matale. The last JVP Political Bureau meeting chaired by Wijeweera was held at Galaha House on November 11, 12 and 13, 1989. The meeting ended on November 12, 1989, at noon as the government imposed a night curfew on November 12, 1989. After the meeting, Saman Piyasiri Fernando, Lalith Wijerathna, Gamanayake and Wijeweera left in a car. Shantha Bandara went his separate ways. Piyadasa and Somawansa Amarasinghe left for Madawala in a separate vehicle to retrieve some money that had been kept for security. On the way back, Somawansa descended Mount Trinity whereas Piyadasa Ranasinghe and H. B. Herath were arrested at Galaha's house on the same day. He was detained at the Mattegoda camp after being tortured and killed on November 15, 1989.

== In popular media ==
The biographical film of Rohana Wijeweera's late life titled Ginnen Upan Seethala was released in 2018. The film was directed by Anurudha Jayasinghe and popular actor Thusitha Laknath played Ranasinghe's role.

== Bibliography ==
- Rohan Gunarathna (1990), Sri Lanka, a lost revolution, Institute of fundamental studies ISBN 955-26-0004-9
- C. A. Chandraprema (1991) Sri Lanka, The Years of Terror- The JVP insurrection 1987-1989, Lake House Bookshop, ISBN 955-9029-03-7
