= Sagarika Gomes =

Sri Lankan newscaster and artist murdered in 1989

- සාගරිකා ගෝමස්
- Born: 19 October 1961; Colombo, Sri Lanka
- Died: 13 September 1989 (aged 27); Colombo, Sri Lanka
- Cause of death: Fatal Gunshot wounds
- Education: Holy Family Convent
- Known for: Murder and torture victim of 1987/89 riots in Sri Lanka against the JVP

Sagarika Chandani Gomes (Sinhala: සාගරිකා ගෝමස්; 19 October 1961 – 13 September 1989), was a Sri Lankan newscaster and aspiring artist, she worked for Rupavahini Corporation, the state-run television channel.

== Early life ==
She was born on 19 October 1961 at the Castle Women's Hospital, Colombo as the youngest of the family with four siblings. She developed her artistic skills while studying at the Presbyterian College, Dehiwala as well as at the Holy Family Convent in Dehiwala. She excelled in dancing from Vajira Chitrasena. She entered the public stage and in Nurti and Nadagam singing in which she sang the Nurti song Lona Muni Rajage Sri Dalada Penwami. During this time, she worked as a bookkeeper at the Towerhall Foundation. However, her free profession was the art of television broadcasting. While reading government news on the radio and television during the period of terror was a deadly ‘traitor’ act. She first travelled abroad to Calcutta in 1983 on a Towerhall Foundation scholarship to take a drama course.

During the 1987–1989 JVP insurrection, employees of the Rupavahini Corporation and the Independent Television Network were ordered by an offshoot of the Janatha Vimukthi Peramuna (JVP), the Patriotic Liberation Organization (Deshapremi Janatha Viyaparaya) led by Saman Piyasiri Fernando to suspend newscasting. Under threat, many of the newscasters refused to present the evening news. Deputy Minister of Information, A. J. Ranasinghe approached Sagarika Gomes to undertake presenting the evening news. She accepted and undertook the evening news.

== Death ==
On 13 September 1989, some unknown persons rushed into her house and detained her, and asked her many questions. Before leaving with them, she removed her gold necklace and bracelet and put them in her father's hand. She was kidnapped from her home by a group of armed men. She was then taken to the beach and killed. She was not sexually assaulted. The guards released the occupants of the house exactly an hour later. Her murderers were never identified. Before her death, she was looking forward to her marriage a few days later with her boyfriend, an army officer.
