= 1989 Temple of the Tooth attack =

- Part of the 1987–1989 JVP insurrection
- Kandy (Sri Lanka)
- Location: 7°17′38″N 80°38′19″E; Kandy, Sri Lanka
- Date: February 8, 1989; 37 years ago
- Target: Temple of the Tooth
- Attack type: Attack using small arms
- Weapon: Guns
- Deaths: 2–5
- Injuries: 1+
- Perpetrator: Janatha Vimukthi Peramuna

The 1989 Temple of the Tooth attack was an attack on the Temple of the Tooth Relic, located in Kandy, Sri Lanka. The shrine, which is considered sacred to the Buddhists in Sri Lanka, houses the relic of the tooth of the Buddha and is a UNESCO-designated World Heritage Site. It was attacked on 8 February 1989, allegedly by the armed cadres affiliated to Janatha Vimukthi Peramuna (JVP), a Marxist–Leninist political party in Sri Lanka.

== Background ==
In the late 1980s, the country was under a tense situation with two insurgencies ravaging both the northern and southern parts of Sri Lanka. The first insurgency was the Sri Lankan Civil War initiated by the Liberation Tigers of Tamil Eelam (LTTE) and several other Tamil militant groups in 1983, who sought to create an independent Tamil state in northern and eastern parts of the country. In 1987, neighboring India intervened in the conflict to bring an end to the fighting between the insurgents and the Sri Lankan armed forces. That year, the Indo-Sri Lanka Accord was signed between the two countries and Indian Peace Keeping Force was deployed in northern Sri Lanka to enforce disarmament of militant organizations and to watch over the regional council.

The JVP and other Sri Lankan nationalist groups viewed this as a proliferation of Indian imperialism. This suspicion was fuelled by the perceived threat of North-Eastern autonomy, due to the presence of IPKF in Sri Lanka. By this time, the JVP was equipped with experiences of a failed insurrection in 1971, against the government of Sirimavo Bandaranaike. Under these circumstances, the party launched a second insurrection in 1987, seeking to overthrow the then-incumbent United National Party government.

== Incident ==
As the tension grew, JVP and its military wing, Patriotic People's Movement (Deshapremi Janatha Viyaparaya) launched attacks on various government and civilian targets. Many public places were vandalised, and people presumed to be supportive of the government were attacked. Temple of the Tooth, located in the heart of the Kandy city too came under attack on 8 February 1989. Eyewitness accounts, including a former JVP member who took part in the attack, describe the incident in detail.

=== Account of Adhikari ===
In 2001, The Sunday Leader, a Sri Lankan English-language weekly, interviewed a former JVP member, Adhikari alias Kosala, who participated in the attack. A fully-fledged member, Adhikari had received arms training, and participated in several operations on behalf of the party, including the Pallekele Army Camp attack, 1987 Bogambara prison attack and Digana bank heist.

According to Adhikari, the first meeting to plan the attack was held at the house of a JVP co-ordinator named Sunanda, in Kandy. In that meeting, Sunanda explained the motivation behind the attack. He believed that taking away the relic of the tooth of the Buddha, which had been residing in the country for at least 1,700 years, would have made the people to rise up against the government which couldn't even protect the sacred property. This relic is traditionally considered as the symbol of the leadership and royalty in Sri Lanka.

Next week, another meeting was held at the same place, with the presence of D.M. Ananda alias Kalu Ajith, the JVP leader of Western and Sabaragamuwa provinces, and Somawansa Amarasinghe alias Sanath, who became the leader of the JVP later and the last surviving politburo member of the party after the rebellion. In that meeting, Adhikari proposed a place in Medamahanuwara, to hide the relic after getting hold of it. On the next day, 8 February, he was asked to be present near the Queen's Hotel, Kandy around 2.00 – 2.30 pm. There he met Sarath, one of his colleagues in Digana bank heist, who introduced him to 4 boys and 2 girls. The girls, dressed in white lama saris were carrying two trays filled with flowers. Adhikari's task was to bring the group to the Makara Thorana (the entrance to the Temple), where he would meet two gentlemen, who carried pens attached to their pockets, as an aid to recognition. As instructed, after completing his job, he proceeded to the Kundasale town, about 5 km from Kandy. There he was waiting to receive the casket which contained the tooth relic.

But the plan did not succeed. From what he learnt, two girls had gone past the checkpoint near the entrance, without being properly searched, and waited for the others to follow. This has aroused the suspicion of a guard, and he had come towards the girls. By this time, members of the group had arrived in the scene; snatched the guns hidden inside the flowers on the tray; and shot at the guards. Guards had returned fire. The following firefight left at least two attackers dead.

=== Account of K.G. Sisira ===
Sisira was employed as a labourer of the Kandy Municipal Council at the time the incident has happened. At that moment, he was travelling on a bus, near the temple. The driver stopped the bus amid the confusion, in front of the shrine. Then Sisira he saw a person wearing a blue T-shirt, chasing a guard, who came running into the bus and boarded. Then the pursuer, who was carrying a gun, shot randomly and hit Sisira in his right leg. In the subsequent shooting spree, the pursuer had died. Sisira was taken to a hospital, where 4 bullets were removed from his leg. His was hospitalised for 8 months and had his leg amputated.

== Aftermath and renewed controversy ==
In the run-up to the 2001 Sri Lankan parliamentary election, the issue of the responsibility of this attack surfaced again. The party leader Somawansa Amarasinghe and then JVP propaganda secretary Wimal Weerawansa, denied the involvement of JVP in the incident. The politburo of the party issued a statement denying that the attack ever took place. These statements were rejected by the then Diyawadana Nilame (the chief lay custodian of Temple of the Tooth), Neranjan Wijeyeratne, and Mahanayaka theros of Malwatte and Asgiriya chapters (chief Buddhist prelates of the country). Wijeyeratne said "There was blood-letting at the Sri Dalada Maligawa [Temple of the Tooth] as five persons were killed in the JVP attack". The controversy turned into a major political issue during the campaign.

== See also ==
- 1998 Temple of the Tooth attack
