= Batalanda detention centre =

Detention centre in Sri Lanka

The Batalanda detention centre was an alleged detention centre located within the Batalanda Housing Scheme of the State Fertiliser Corporation in the village of Butalanda, situated in the Biyagama Electorate. It was used by the Counter Subversive Unit of the Sri Lanka Police during the 1987–89 JVP insurrection to detain persons who were linked to or suspected to have links to the Janatha Vimukthi Peramuna (JVP), as part of the counterinsurgency campaign launched by the United National Party (UNP) government led by President Ranasinghe Premadasa.

== Background ==
Unlike in the previous uprising, the JVP relied heavily on the use of assassinations of important religious and political figures, subversion, and terror attacks. The government responded just as brutally; the government has been accused of using detention camps in several locations, including Batalanda, to quell the JVP uprising. The camps were said to be run by anti-subversive units of the police who were tasked with destroying rebels.

== Batalanda Commission ==
During the 1994 general election Presidential candidate for the People's Alliance Chandrika Kumaratunga blamed Prime Minister Ranil Wickremesinghe as the main political authority behind the alleged detention centre, which was located in his electorate but he was not the president or prime minister or in charge of army or the police during 1980s. Following the victory of the People's Alliance in the 1994 general election and the 1994 presidential election, which resulted in the defeat of the UNP government, the newly elected President Kumaratunga appointed several Presidential Commissions of Inquiry to investigate allegations of human rights violations during the 1987–89 JVP insurrection. These included the Presidential Commissions of Inquiry in to the death of Lieutenant General Denzil Kobbekaduwa and the death of Lalith Athulathmudali. However, Kumaratunga appointed The Commission of Inquiry into the establishment and maintenance of places of unlawful detention and torture chambers at the Batalanda Housing Scheme under the Commission of Inquiry Act of 1948 as a Commissions of Inquiry to carry out an formal inquiry by summoning witness and submit a report into the alleged detention centre at Batalanda and was commonly known as the Batalanda Commission.

The Batalanda Commission was made up of Justice Dharmasiri Jayewickrema, Judge of the Court of Appeal and Nimal Dissanayka, High Court judge of Colombo, with R. I. Obeysekera, President's Counsel and Yasantha Kodagoda, State Counsel assisting. The commission handed over the Commission Report to President Kumaratunga on 27 March 1998. The remote named police officers who it claimed responsible for the Police Counter Subversive Unit detaining and torturing suspects at the Batalanda Housing Scheme and claimed that Wickremesinghe had knowledge of use of torture as a reaction to the JVP insurgent activity. Unlike a Presidential Commissions of Inquiry, the Batalanda Commission did not have the warrant to recommend then-opposition leader Ranil Wickremesinghe stripped of his civic rights, since it had jurisdiction to find any person guilty. The commission report that was published by the government in 2000, recommended to the government to discuss its findings in parliament and develop a code of conduct for members of parliament to lead to impeachment if found to have breached and disciplinary action against the relevant police officers.

Although the commission recommended the President to forward its findings to the Attorney General to consider necessary criminal proceedings; no legal action against Wickremesinghe has been taken by any government to date, however, and many who were arrested for their involvement in the alleged killings have been revealed to be from organizations such as the Sri Lanka Mahajana Pakshaya, a political party founded in 1984 by Kumaratunga and her husband Vijaya Kumaratunga, who was assassinated in 1988.
