= Terrence Perera =

Sri Lankan police officer

Terrence Perera (death 3 December 1987) was a Sri Lankan police officer. A deputy inspector General(DIG), he was serving as the Director Counter Subversive Unit of the Sri Lanka Police leading the suppression of the Janatha Vimukthi Peramuna (JVP) and its subversion activities during the 1987–1989 JVP insurrection when he was gundown by an JVP hitmen in Battaramulla on 3 December 1987.
