= Kamala Wijeratne =

- Born: 16 August 1939 (age 87); Ulapane, Kandy, Sri Lanka
- Occupations: Poet short story writer
- Writing career
- Notable awards: Sahitya Ratna lifetime award State Literary Award

Kamala Wijeratne is an educationist in the field of English, a short story writer, and a poet from Sri Lanka. She has received many awards, including the State Literary Awards and the Sahithya Ratna Lifetime Award, which is the highest honor given to Sri Lankans who have made an outstanding contribution to Sri Lankan literature.

== Biography ==
Wijeratne was born on 15 August 1939, in Ulapane, a village near Kandy in Sri Lanka. After her early education at Teldeniya, she graduated from St. Scholasticus College, Kandy, in 1955 and from Madya Maha Vidyalaya, Gampola, in 1958. She then attended the University of Peradeniya (now the University of Ceylon), where she studied English, Sinhala, and economics. After graduating in 1962 and acquiring a Postgraduate Diploma, she received her Masters in Arts in Education (MEd) from the University of Ceylon, Peradeniya. In 1992, she was awarded a scholarship by the British Council to study her second Master of Arts in Teaching English to Speakers of Other Languages (TESOL) from the University of Edinburgh.

Wijeratne started her career as a teacher, joined as a lecturer at the Teacher's College, Peradeniya, and later joined the National Institute of Education as a Chief Project Officer. She retired from service in 1999 and currently works as a visiting lecturer at the Faculty of Education at the University of Colombo and the Department of English at the University of Sri Jayawardhanapura.

While she started writing in her teens, Wijeratne's professional writing began in 1983 with the publication of her first poetry collection, Smell of Araliya. She writes about aspects of Sri Lankan culture; some of her poems reflect women's inner feelings in Sri Lankan culture. Some of her poems are an expression of her resentment of war and violence in Sri Lanka and their repercussions on the lives of civilians. In 2019, she began writing her first novel, titled An Untold Story, which was published in 2020.

== Literary works ==
=== Poetry collection ===
- The Smell of Araliya (1983)
- A house Divided (1985) – Poems dealing with the internal violence and the widening gap between ethnic groups in Sri Lanka
- The Disinherited (1986)- A reaction to the violence of 1988 – 1990
- That One Talent (1987)- Reaction to the continuing violence and the social upheavals of the 90's
- The White Saree and Other Poems- Sensitive reaction to the violence of the North and South. (1988)
- Millenium Poems (2002)- Deals with a variety of issues; war, pollution, corruption, love and death. It received State literary prize
- A Prayer to God Upulwan (2007)- Sensitive reaction to the Tsunami of 2004, ethnic misunderstanding, legend and myth.
- The Other Trojan Woman (2014)
- My Green Book (2015)
- Impressions (2017)

=== Short story collection ===
- Death by Drowning and Other Stories (1998)- Short stories that deal with various themes like development, charge, women's issues etc.
- Ten Stories (2012)
- The Potted Plant (2014)

=== Novel ===
- An Untold Story (2020)
- Anithyagama: the end of an era

== Awards ==
- 2002 – State Literary Award for Poetry collection
- 2012 – State Literary Award for the Best Anthology of Short Stories
- 2012 – Godage award for the best collection of short stories
- 2014 – State Literary Award for the Best Anthology of Short Stories
- 2014 – Godage award for the Best Collection of Short stories
- 2019 – Sahitya Ratna lifetime achievements award
- 2019 – Award from the National Institute of Education, Maharagam at the National RESC conference (2019)

== Personal life ==
In 1966 she married Rankondegedara Wijeratne, who was a Deputy Director of Small Industries in Kandy. They have three children.
