= Upatissa Gamanayake =

Sri Lankan politician (1948–1989)

Upatissa Gamanayake උපතිස්ස ගමනායක

Deputy leader of Janatha Vimukthi Peramuna
- In office 1984–1989
- Leader: Rohana Wijeweera

Personal details
- Born: Don Upatissa Gamanayake; 17 October 1948 Kantale, Sri Lanka
- Died: 13 November 1989 (aged 41) Boralesgamuwa, Sri Lanka
- Party: Janatha Vimukthi Peramuna
- Spouse: S. Karunawathi (1978–1989)
- Children: 2
- Education: Gantalawa Maha Vidyalaya
- Alma mater: University of Colombo
- Occupation: Politician, Revolutionary leader

Don Upatissa Gamanayake (Sinhala: උපතිස්ස ගමනායක; 17 October 1948 – 13 November 1989), also known by his alias Dias Mudalali, was a Sri Lankan politician and the deputy leader of the Jantha Vimukthi Peramuna (JVP) during the 1987–1989 insurrection. Not a prominent figure during the JVP's 1971 insurrection, Gamanayake emerged as a leader only after the releasing of the JVP detainees in 1977. He moved up rapidly in the party hierarchy during the JVP's 1977–1983 democratic phase and became the second in command after the founder and the leader, Rohana Wijeweera. He unsuccessfully contested the 1983 Anamaduwa by-election under JVP. Gamanayake was captured and killed by the government forces in November 1989.

== Family background ==
He was born on 17 October 1948 in Mahingala, Padukka, Sri Lanka as the seventh child in a family with nine siblings. His father Don Upenis was born in Welihena village in Athuraliya Divisional Secretariat, Akuressa and his mother Wettasinghe Arachchige Maginona was born in Padukka. Upenis, a former chena farmer, came to Padukka and worked in a rubber estate. Maginona died in 1956 after being bitten by a snake. After the death of his mother, his family went to Kantale Farm Colony in 1958 under the program of settling new settlers in farming colonies. Gamanayake was educated at Venrasanpura Tamil School and Gantalawa Maha Vidyalaya.

Gamanayake was married in 1978 to Arambe Devalage S. Karunawathi aka Karuna, a native of Ihalagama, Rambukkana Parape. Karuna was a JVP activist who was subjected to police harassment during the 1971 uprising. She was educated at Mawathagama Central College, and joined the JVP in 1969 as a schoolgirl. Several members of her family, including Gnana, were arrested in 1971 as JVP activists. Arrested during the 1971 uprising, Karuna was released from prison in 1976 after serving a suspended sentence.

After the assassination of Gamanayake, his wife Karuna, who came to Italy illegally in 1991 and sought political asylum, later emigrated to Britain in 1993 with the encouragement of the JVP London Committee in Britain, including lawyer Ranjith Mendis. The two children were then brought in as well. Karuna and her two children returned to Sri Lanka for the first time after 17 years. His son Suchira Chamika (born in 1982) living in the UK in 2018, is a technician. His daughter Janitha's first marriage took place in 2009. Janitha (born in 1980) was married for the second time in 2016 to a British national.

== Political career ==
He started politics at the Kantale Ceylon National Students' Union of the Communist Party at school age and was the President of the Communist Students' Union which he secretly started at Kantale Maha Vidyalaya. The Trincomalee District Branch of the Ceylon National Students' Union was established by Palitha Shamdas Solomons and Palitha Gurusinghe, student leaders from the Communist Party Headquarters. He started JVP politics in November 1968 while still in school through Angampodi Cyril Jayaratne, a teacher at Pulmudai Maha Vidyalaya. Piyasiri Gunaratne, a Trincomalee railway clerk born in Ambalangoda, conducted JVP classes for Gamanayake. Later he qualified for the Faculty of Arts at the University of Colombo in 1969.

Gamanayake worked with many in the JVP activities in the Trincomalee District from November 1968 to April 1971. During the April 1971 Insurrection, insurgents attacked police stations in Trincomalee, Uppuveli and Kantale, but failed. Gamanayake was also involved in the Kantale police raid. He was not arrested during the April 1971 uprising and secretly aided and abetted the formation of the party. However, he was later arrested in 1973 in a robbery to raise funds for the JVP. On March 18, 1975, under Wijeweera's guidance, Gamanayake set up a temporary JVP central committee in prison. Then the first press conference of the JVP was held under his direction with the appointment of Attorney-at-Law M. N. Jayasinghe as the Acting General Secretary which was held on 19 February 1977. In the meantime, he held a rally in Hyde Park on March 10, 1977, and the first May Day rally of the JVP was held on May 1, 1977, at Dematagoda Park under the leadership of Gamanayake.

After the new Central Committee of the JVP was held for three days in 1978 at Omaragolla Koskele in the Kurunegala District, Gamanayake was later appointed as the General Secretary of the Socialist Workers Union under this all the affiliated organizations of the JVP were reorganized. Meanwhile, he led a JVP group contested as an independent group for The Colombo Municipal Council election which was held in 1978. Although no one was elected, they received more votes than the Lanka Sama Samaja Party (LSSP) and the Communist Party. Then five by-elections were held from 1977 to 1981, of which the JVP came third in the December 1979 Galle by-election with Lionel Bopage receiving 3,366 votes. The Anamaduwa by-election was held in May 1980 and he contested it and received 857 votes.

Since 1976, he was the Unofficial Chief Secretary of JVP. With the banning of the JVP, Bopage's responsibilities were 'evaporated' and Gamanayake took over as the party's general secretary after 1984. When the JVP banned it in July 1983, Gamanayake was living in Part D of Bolamesawatta in Narahenpita. It is said that Gamanayake then retreated to Panagama in Ratnapura and stayed there for two weeks at the house of Major Gnanatilake Marasinghe. Later, he was active in the Eluwankulama area in the Puttalam district with party leaders including Wijeweera. Former Anuradhapura District Secretary Sisira Randeniya took care of Gamanayake after lifting the ban. When several JVP officials withdrew from their responsibilities, he reactivates JVP during ban after he was appointed as the new General Secretary. Later he was also known as Wilbert, Kalu Mahaththaya, Kuruppuge Gunasiri Dias and Dias Mudalali.

Gamanayake and his family lived for some time in a village called Kajugaswatta near the Lenagala Rajamaha Viharaya on Ratnapura Road in Horana. They stayed in a house in the village for three years and continued to sew clothes as a home business. Meanwhile, he was caught by the police at work but was released one day as he was under a different name. After that incidence, he changed the residence. In his late years, Gamanayake was living in a house about 100 meters down the Model Lane, just south of the Mahawila Junction in Bandaragama, a few miles down Horana Road in Panadura under the name Kuruppuge Gunasiri Dias. He became popular as 'Dias Mudalali' as he ran a grocery store and a small sewing business in the house called "Nisansala".

== Assassination ==
The last JVP Political Bureau meeting chaired by Wijeweera was held at Galaha House on November 11, 12 and 13, 1989. The meeting ended on November 12, 1989, at noon as the government imposed a night curfew on November 12, 1989. After the meeting, Saman Piyasiri Fernando, Lalith Wijerathna, Gamanayake and Wijeweera left in a car. Shantha Bandara went his separate ways. Piyadasa Ranasinghe and Somawansa Amarasinghe leave for Madawala in a separate vehicle to retrieve some money that had been kept for security. On the way back, Somawansa descended Mount Trinity whereas Piyadasa Ranasinghe and H. B. Herath were arrested at Galaha's house on the same day.

Hours later, Wijeweera and Gamanayake were arrested the next morning. Wijeweera, Ranasinghe and Herath were brought to Colombo on the night of November 12, 1989. Wijeweera and Herath were killed the next morning. Gamanayake, who is attending the Politburo meeting, returned to Bandaragama at 12 noon. The next morning on November 13, he went to Mirigama for a discussion, but returned home as it had changed. Gamanayake was arrested at his Bandaragama residence on November 13, 1989, by two men in civil who had arrived in two white cars. He was brought to the Ops Combine Joint Operations Center and had deep lengthy interrogations. Army Intelligence Special Officer Daya Ratnayake questioned him but could not obtain any important information. He was later taken to the Mattegoda camp and tortured, but no information was revealed. He was killed in Boralesgamuwa the same night. His body was cremated at the Kohuwala Cemetery under emergency orders.

== In popular media ==
The biographical film of Rohana Wijeweera's late life titled Ginnen Upan Seethala was released in 2018. The film was directed by Anurudha Jayasinghe and popular actor Jagath Manuwarna played Gamanayake's role.

== Electoral history ==
Electoral history of Upatissa Gamanayake
| Election | Constituency | Party | Votes | Result |
|---|---|---|---|---|
| 1983 parliamentary by | Anamaduwa | JVP | 857 | Not Elected |

== See also ==
- 1987–89 JVP Insurrection
- Janatha Vimukthi Peramuna
