= Galagedara, Central Province =

Galagedara, Sri Lanka
- Location within Sri Lanka
- Coordinates: 7°22′06″N 80°31′39″E
- Province: Central Province

Government
  - Grama Niladhari: Kasun Chamara Gunawardana
- Time zone: UTC+5:30 (Sri Lanka Standard Time Zone)
  - Summer (DST): UTC+6

Galagedara is a town in the Central Province of Sri Lanka.
