= Somawansa Amarasinghe =

Sri Lankan politician and former JVP leader (1943–2016)

Somawansha Amarasinghe
- සෝමවංශ අමරසිංහ

4th Leader of Janatha Vimukthi Peramuna
- In office 1 January 1990 – 2 February 2014
- Preceded by: Lalith Wijerathna
- Succeeded by: Anura Kumara Dissanayake

Personal details
- Born: Amarasinghe Kankanamlage Somawansa; 1 January 1943 Payagala, Kalutara
- Died: 15 June 2016 (aged 73) Rajagiriya, Sri Lanka
- Party: Janatha Vimukthi Peramuna; People’s Servants Party
- Education: Kalutara Vidyalaya
- Occupation: Politician

Amarasinghe Kankanamlage Somawansa (1 January 1943 – 15 June 2016 as Sinhala: සෝමවංශ අමරසිංහ), commonly as Somawansha Amarasinghe, was a Sri Lankan politician, and the 4th leader of the Janatha Vimukthi Peramuna party, after Rohana Wijeweera, Saman Piyasiri Fernando and Lalith Wijerathna and served as its leader for 23 years until 2 February 2014. He is often described as a strategic leader who socialized the ideological struggle of the JVP into socialism through the nationalist struggle to save the country from Tamil separatist terrorism.

He was the leader of the People's Servants Party, established in June 2015, until his death.

== Personal life ==
He was born on 1 January 1943 in Angangoda village, Payagala, Sri Lanka as the youngest of the family. He had 4 elder brothers and 3 elder sisters. His father was James Amarasinghe, who first served in the police and later joined the Department of Irrigation, and his mother was a housewife. He completed his primary education at Amarasekara College, Kalutara and Kalutara Balika Vidyalaya. Then he attended Kalutara Vidyalaya for secondary education. After passing the Advanced Level, he trained at the Galgamuwa Irrigation Technical Training College in 1963 and worked as a Technical Officer in the Irrigation Department in Galle, Kalmunai, Bibila, Rajanganaya and Colombo.

He married Herath Mudiyanselage Pamara Kumari Herath also known as Irangani Malani Ranasinghe in December 1978. She was a mathematics teacher at Maharagama Teachers' College, Angangoda, Kalutara. His son is Isuru Amarasinghe, who currently lives in England.

Somawansa's third elder sister Kusuma, was married to Nandisena Cooray, the former deputy chairman of the Colombo Municipal Council, who was the elder brother of Minister Sirisena Cooray.

Amarasinghe died on 15 June 2016 at the age of 73 at his brothers Piyasena's residence, where he was living after leaving JVP, in Rajagiriya. The cause was a stroke; he earlier had a heart attack.

== Political career ==
With the JVP classes conducted by Danoris Aiya in 1969, he was influenced to become one of the leading political figures in Sri Lanka. He joined JVP in 1969 through Hettiarachchige Navaratne Bandara, where he was very popular as Siri ayya alias Uncle Reggie alias Reginald Patrick among members. Technical Officer Paranavithana informed Navaratne Banda about Somawansa and after the first discussion at Devanam Piyatissa Mawatha in Maradana, he expressed his desire to join the business, attended JVP classes at Danoris Aiya's trade union office at the Land Development Department on Castle Street. In 1970 he became an active member of JVP after resigning from the job. He was also known in several names: Reginald Patrick, Reggie Kandappa, Michael, Fanlin Danio and Nimal Bandara Dissanayake.

During many political meetings, he wore long-sleeved shirts and was fluent in English. He conducted many rallies and maintained regular contacts with human rights, cultural and media circles all around Colombo, becoming prospects of future JVP hands. In JVP Insurrection of 1971, Somawansa was assigned to lead the abduction of the then Prime Minister Sirimavo Bandaranaike from Rosmead Place and drive the abduction vehicle. He was carrying a bag of bombs to join the Rosmead attack until 10.30pm on 4 April 1971, near the Ritz Cinema in Borella, but no other members arrived. Somawansa along with Ederamulla Sarath, Raja, Nimal and several others were arrested on the night of 5 April 1971 after being caught carrying the bag of bombs.

During this day, he met Rohana Wijeweera for the first time where he first spoke to Wijeweera in prison in 1975. Amarasinghe was also the best friend of Wijeweera in his last days. Subsequently, with the lifting of the state of emergency in December 1976, Kelly Senanayake, Upatissa Gamanayake, Somawansa, Samarappulige Somasiri alias Ragama Some and several others were released on 25 December 1976. These released team members were also active in demanding the release of other political prisoners and reorganizing the party. Siripala Aiya's house on Devanam Piyatissa Mawatha in Maradana was their headquarters at that time. In the meantime, Niyamuwa newspaper and the campaign rallies began accordingly. Until Wijeweera's release on 2 November 1977, Somawansa joined others in organizing political events.

Amarasinghe was the leader who coordinated the international network, human rights organizations and intellectuals during the JVP's Second Rebellion. Somawansa was a member of the Central Committee of the JVP from 1978 until the banning of the party in 1983. Amarasinghe became a Politburo Member of the JVP in 1984. He was the only surviving member of the JVP's Politburo at the end of the JVP's Second Rebellion. With insurrection starting in the late 1980s, his wife and son were sent to Japan in April for safety, but returned home in September of the same year. But on many occasions, he sent his family to many parts of the world many times for safety. He stayed with his JVP friends until Wijeweera was captured and other leaders were killed by the government.

The last JVP Political Bureau meeting chaired by Wijeweera was held at Galaha House on 11, 12 and 13 November 1989. The meeting ended on 12 November 1989, at noon as the government imposed a night curfew on 12 November 1989. After the meeting, Saman Piyasiri Fernando, Lalith Wijerathna, Gamanayake and Wijeweera left in a car. Shantha Bandara went his separate way. Piyadasa Ranasinghe and Somawansa left for Madawala in a separate vehicle to retrieve some money that had been kept for security. On the way back, Somawansa descended Mount Trinity whereas Piyadasa and H. B. Herath were arrested at Galaha's house on the same day. Later he fled to India on a boat on 17 March 1990, to save his life with the help of Matale Wicky alias Selva.

He arrived in Thailand with his family from India on 19 October 1990, and sought political asylum at the United Nations High Commissioner for Refugees on 6 March 1991. Later on 7 July 1991, he went to Italy and stayed at Walpolage Dharmasena's house. Then, at 8 pm on 26 August 1991, Somawansa was brought to the French border in Turin, Italy, by Dharmasena's car. Shortly afterwards, Somawansa traveled to Britain via France, where he formally reorganized the JVP. He returned to Sri Lanka in 1994 after all the JVP inner circle leaders were killed and government has changed. He rebuilt the Janatha Vimukthi Peramuna after fourteen of its top leaders were eliminated in 1989/1990. In the general election held on 16 August 1994, the JVP contested for the Progressive Front of Sri Lanka under the name of the National Salvation Front and won one seat in the Hambantota District. A special convention was held in Tangalle on 15 May 1995, to establish the legal rights of the JVP. Later, the JVP even won 39 seats in parliament through the SLFP coalition.

The JVP formed a probationary government with the People's United Front in 2001, but formed the United People's Freedom Alliance in 2004 with the SLFP. He also supported Mahinda Rajapakse in his presidential campaign in 2005 as well. He continued to be the leader until his retirement in February 2014.

Somawansa left the JVP on 16 April 2015, and formed a party called the Janatha Sevaka Party (People's Servants Party) with 38 JVP activists. After his resignation from the JVP due to many political disputes, he formed his own party with name People's Servants Party in June 2015.

== In popular media ==
The biographical film of Rohana Wijeweera's late life titled Ginnen Upan Seethala screened in 2019 on the silver screen. The film was directed by Anurudha Jayasinghe and popular actor Sujeewa Priyalal played Amarasinghe's role.

Party political offices
Preceded by Lalith Wijerathna	Leader of Janatha Vimukthi Peramuna; 1 January 1990 – 2 February 2014	Succeeded by Anura Kumara Dissanayake
