= Black Cat group =

Former paramilitary group in Sri Lanka

Black Cats
- Dates active: 1989–1993
- Country: Sri Lanka
- Allegiance: United National Party
- Ideology: Anti-communism

The Black Cat group, or the Black Cats, was a pro-United National Party (UNP) paramilitary group in Sri Lanka. The Black Cats were initially formed following the electoral victory of President Ranasinghe Premadasa. It was the predominant anti-communist paramilitary of the United National Party.

The group was not publicly recognized until late 1989. It was one of the 13 death squads sponsored by the Sri Lankan government to suppress opposition during the 1987–1989 JVP insurrection.

== Suppression of the press ==
The Black Cat group killed 830 politicians who were associated with the anti-UNP newspaper of the Communist Party of Sri Lanka. These killings were only partially counted by the government due to the ongoing JVP insurgency.

== Eppawala attack ==
The group was found guilty of a massacre in Eppawala, killing suspected JVP members and other civilians. This was said to be a retaliation attack.
