= Saman Piyasiri Fernando =

Second leader and military commander of JVP

- සමන් පියසිරි ප්‍රනාන්දු

2nd Leader of Janatha Vimukthi Peramuna
- In office 13 November 1989 – 29 December 1989
- Preceded by: Rohana Wijeweera
- Succeeded by: Lalith Wijerathna

Personal details
- Born: Sellapperumage Saman Piyasiri Fernando; 23 March 1958 Moratuwa, Sri Lanka
- Died: December 29, 1989 (aged 31) Colombo, Sri Lanka
- Party: Janatha Vimukthi Peramuna
- Education: Galahitiyawa Central College
- Alma mater: University of Kelaniya
- Occupation: Military commander
- Known for: Leadership of the DJV
- Military service
- Branch: Deshapremi Janatha Viyaparaya and Patriotic People's Armed Troops
- Commands: Commander-in-chief of the Patriotic People's Battalion (1986–1989); Supreme commander of the DJV (November 1989 – December 1989)

Sellapperumage Saman Piyasiri Fernando (23 March 1958 – 29 December 1989: Sinhala: සමන් පියසිරි ප්‍රනාන්දු: nom de guerre: Keerthi Vijayabahu), was the military wing leader of the Janatha Vimukthi Peramuna during the 1987-89 insurrection in Sri Lanka, the JVP's military wing also known as Deshapremi Janatha Viyaparaya (DJV). His position in the JVP as the military commander was organizationally higher than the position of Rohana Wijeweera, the founder of the JVP.

Saman Piyasiri a graduate of the University of Kelaniya, Sri Lanka later joined the JVP and promoted to the higher ranks of the party, appointed as the military wing leader and finally led the party after the death of the founding leader Rohana Wijeweera. He was also known as Kabraal, Mendis, Bappa, Mudiyanse, Mahinda, Dhammika and Janaka.

== Family background and early life ==
He was born on 23 March 1958 in Lunawa, Moratuwa, Sri Lanka as the third child in a Karava ethnic family with four siblings. His father Ebert Fernando was an inspector at the Ports Commission. His mother, T. Josie Engalsina Peiris was a teacher. Piyasiri's elder sister, a resident of Ganemulla, once worked as a nurse in a government hospital and was married in 1981 and later became a mother of two. His younger sister Ranjani later became a full time member of the JVP. The elder brother was a sick child and died in 1970 at the Angoda Hospital. Due to the financial difficulties of the family, his body was even buried at the hospital cemetery at the expense of the government.

Although Piyasiri's father was a supporter of the Lanka Sama Samaja Party (LSSP) and helped everyone, the childhood of his children was very sad due to his excessive alcoholism. Meanwhile, they had to leave the Egoda Uyana in Moratuwa and move to Ganemulla, which belonged to a relative of his mother, due to disputes with neighbors and relatives. Piyasiri, who until then had been educated up to grade 5 at Egoda Uyana Junior School, entered grade 6 at Kuda Bollatha Primary School. He entered Hemamali College, Galahitiyawa in Grade 8 and later entered Galahitiyawa Central College. He passed the GCE Ordinary Level Examination with 6 marks. He entered the University of Kelaniya in 1978 after completing his Advanced Level in Commerce in 1977 with 1 Excellence, 1 Award and 2 Excellence. Piyasiri was 5 feet 2 inches tall and slightly fat. There was a black spot on the left hand and a similar spot on the back of the right ear.

Piyasiri's parents and family members, who were staying in the Moonagama area in Horana when Piyasiri became the military leader, later went to Poruwadanda. Later he went to Panadura and Nugegoda Ekawatte to several places including Udahamulla. They resided in his Nawala home since December 25, 1989. Saman's sister Ranjani was among those who had been with Wijeweera's wife and children for a short time to help with the house when Wijeweera was staying at the Haldummulla rice field in Haldummulla 1987 and the houses in Neluwa Lewgodawatte, Bandarawela since July 1987.

On the day of Piyasiri's arrest, he was ready for the marriage with his girlfriend Indrani, the sister of Daya Wanniarachchi, the son of former JVP secretary Weeraketiya Heenbunne. Later, Piyasiri's mother, his younger sister Ranjani, girlfriend Indrani and her younger brother Saman Bandula (who was 18 years old) were arrested by the security forces. Saman's mother was released a few months later. Saman's sister and girlfriend were interrogated at various locations, including the 6th floor of the CID headquarters, and were eventually released after two years of rehabilitation at the Ranmutugala home. But Saman Bandula Wanniarachchi was killed two days after his arrest.

== Political career ==
Piyasiri joined the JVP through Ragama Some after listening to a speech by Upatissa Gamanayake at a JVP rally in Veyangoda in 1978. He participated in the education camp held at Pallewela Muddaragama in the Mirigama electorate which was conducted by Wickramarala Jayatilleke. In the meantime, the JVP Socialist Students' Union was formed in Kelaniya University as a force against the UNP's Socialist Students' Union in the late 1970s under the leadership of Sudarshana Ponnaweera, Saman Piyasiri Fernando, Sirimevan and others. Piyasiri is the second best student in the history of the university with the highest number of marks. After graduating as a Commerce graduate, Piyasiri opted for full-time JVP politics instead of a job. He later became a JVP organizer for the Kolonnawa and Ratnapura electorates.

After the JVP was banned in July 1983, he became a member of the Central Committee in mid-February 1984. His commitment to rebuilding the JVP was appreciated and in October 1985 he was appointed to the JVP Politburo. The first formal discussion on the formation of the Deshapremi Janatha Viyaparaya (Patriotic People's Movement), the armed wing of the JVP, was held for two days on March 4 and 5, 1986 at the Ratnapura canal and Piyasiri was appointed as the leader of the military wing at the Politburo meeting held there. As Wijeweera was ill, it was chaired by Piyadasa Ranasinghe and the meeting was held at the house of Podi Mahaththaya, a businessman in Kudugalwatta, Ratnapura. On March 12, 1988, while at a house on Embillawatta Road in Boralesgamuwa, Piyasiri managed to escape by hiding in a pile of jackfruit leaves in front of his house.

Piyasiri led the JVP in five major attacks on army camps and police stations, and had planned 12 more. The military intelligence of Sri Lanka believes that Piyasiri was masterminded the guerilla attacks on military bases and installations during the insurrection. The strategy was for the security forces to retreat without fighting in powerful situations and to launch vigilante attacks when they were weak. But by the middle of the Second insurrection, everything had turned upside down, with the majority leading to killings and sabotage.

- Katunayake Air-force base and Kotelawala Defence Academy (May 1987).
- Katunayake Air-force base (April 1988).
- Magazine prison break (December 1988).
- Pannala Army detachment (1989).
- Panagoda Army base (1989).
- Police Field Force headquarters, Colombo (1989).
- Number of Police stations.

After Wijeweera's assassination, Piyasiri became the leader of the JVP on November 28, 1989, at a meeting of the Political Bureau held at Panukerapitiya, Ratnapura. Later the government issued a statement on November 28, 1989, stating that they wanted to arrest Somawansa Amarasinghe, Shantha Bandara, Saman Piyasiri Fernando, Gamini Gunasekara and Upali Jayaweera and that valuable rewards would be given to those who provided information about them. Piyasiri was first revealed to be the leader of the JVP through the Sinhala service of the Veritas Catholic Radio broadcast from the Philippines on 1 December 1989.

Then the rebels launched several attacks across the country. Insurgents led by Piyasiri, bombed a meeting of the Janatha Estate Development Board in Slave Island in November 1989, during which Bank of Ceylon Deputy General Manager E. T. Fernando died. During the bombing, they target Minister of State Samaraweera Weerawanni, who was to chair the meeting. On November 26, 1989, insurgents made another bomb attack to assassinate Minister of Sports Nanda Mathew and Minister of State for Justice Tyrone Fernando during a meeting of the Youth Services Council at Prince of Wales College, Moratuwa. At least 25 people, including two ministers, were injured in a bomb attack. Under the leadership of Piyasiri, several such attacks were carried out in the capital and suburbs. But they almost completely failed, and the rebels who participated were killed in retaliation. Then on November 26, 1989, they destroyed Ukuwela Power Plant in Matale. Several train stations, including Ohio, were set on fire. Insurgents stormed a Korean Kiannam road project in Gokarella, looted Rs. 80,000 and set fire to vehicles, killing one Korean engineer. Five JVP rebels stormed the police post at Alawwa Town Hall on November 25, 1989, and attempted to seize weapons, while four rebels were killed in a similar attack on the Dickwella Police on the same day. All attempts at hijacking also failed.

On December 27, 1989, a special police team, led by SSP Lionel Gunathilake, arrested Saman Piyasiri, along with his mother and fiancé, who is a sister of JVP politburo member Daya Wanniarachchi, at Koswatte, Nawala, at a rented house owned by Mark Antony Fernando, who works at SLBC. According to the police sources, the number of military books found inside the house and some of them are not found in Sri Lankan military libraries. Piyasiri was arrested on December 27, 1989, while staying at a house in Koswatta, Nawala by the special police team. In late years, he was suffered by Keloid. He was taken to the Police Crime Investigation Headquarters (CDB) on Gregory's Road, Borella and questioned under the supervision of Superintendents of Police: Lionel Goonetileke, Gamini Perera, Ariyasinghe and Jayasinghe. He was later taken to the Combined Operations Center (OPs Combine) and questioned at length, tortured, but he did not answer. Finally, he was assassinated on December 29, 1989, in Mattegoda and his body was dumped on a pile of coconut branches.

Along with Piyasiri, two other JVP military wing members were assassinated: Samarapulige Somasiri alias Ragama Someda, a member of the Central Committee of the JVP who was arrested by the security forces at Delkanda, Nugegoda on December 28, 1989, and Justus Dilip Chandra Fernando alias Pathi alias Zoysa, a resident of Welisara who was the Armed Secretary of the Colombo and Gampaha Districts. The Sri Lankan government media released on December 29, 1989, as "the leader of the JVP military wing killed along with four other cadres due to the cross fire between security forces and the JVP at their military wing headquarters, a farm located at Hedigama-Suwarapola, Piliyandala". As the second leader of the JVP on November 28, 1989, Piyasiri was the leader of the JVP for 32 days until he was assassinated on December 29, 1989.

Rohan Gunaratna also stated that before Piyasiri's death, he managed to deliver a speech to the interrogation personnel around him about the society of Sri Lanka based on capitalism and socialism. Rohan further stated, "but Saman Piyasiri has not given any single information which could harm the party during the interrogation". The killings of rebels, their families, relatives and friends also intensified with these attacks. Due to Piyasiri's inability to stay on target, the entire JVP machinery was destroyed by the security forces within seven weeks. Within seven weeks of Wijeweera's assassination, 12 of the 13 members of the First Politburo were assassinated and only Somawansa Amarasinghe was left. Meanwhile, nine of the 11 members of the Second Politburo headed by Piyasiri were also killed. Only Somawansa and Gamini Gunasekera were left.

== In popular media ==
The biographical film of Rohana Wijeweera's late life titled Ginnen Upan Seethala was released in 2018. The film was directed by Anurudha Jayasinghe and popular actor Susan Niroshan played Piyasiri's role.

== See also ==
- Rohana Wijeweera

== Sources ==
- Gunaratna, Rohan (1990). Sri Lanka - A Lost Revolution?: The Inside Story of the JVP. Kandy, Sri Lanka: Institute of Fundamental Studies. ISBN 978-9552600043.

Party political offices
Preceded by Rohana Wijeweera	Leader of Janatha Vimukthi Peramuna; 13 November 1989 – 29 December 1989	Succeeded by Lalith Wijerathna
