= Ulapane =

Ulapane உலப்பனை
- Village
- Location within Sri Lanka
- Coordinates: 7°6′10″N 80°33′40″E
- Country: Sri Lanka
- Province: Central Province
- District: Kandy District

Government
- Time zone: UTC+5:30 (Sri Lanka Standard Time)
- postal zip code: 20562

Ulapane is a village in Sri Lanka. It is located within Central Province.

== Notable people ==
- Kamala Wijeratne - English language poet
