= Ginnen Upan Seethala =

- Theatrical release poster
- Sinhala: ගින්නෙන් උපන් සීතල
- Directed by: Anuruddha Jayasinghe
- Written by: Ariyawansha Dammage
- Based on: Biography of Rohana Wijeweera
- Produced by: Cinepro Lanka International
- Starring: Kamal Addaraarachchi; Sulochana Weerasinghe; Jagath Manuwarna; Sujeewa Priyalal
- Cinematography: Dhanushka Gunathilake
- Edited by: Ravindra Guruge
- Music by: Nadeeka Guruge
- Release date: 18 January 2019
- Running time: 150 minutes
- Country: Sri Lanka
- Language: Sinhala
- Box office: 600 lakh LKR

Ginnen Upan Seethala (Sinhala: ගින්නෙන් උපන් සීතල, lit. 'The Fire born frozen') is a 2019 Sinhala biographical film about Sri Lankan Marxist revolutionary Rohana Wijeweera directed by Anuruddha Jayasinghe and produced by Chamathka Peiris for Cinepro Lanka International. The film stars Kamal Addaraarachchi and Sulochana Weerasinghe in lead roles along with Jagath Manuwarna and Sujeewa Priyalal in supporting roles. Music composed by Nadeeka Guruge. It is the 1321st Sri Lankan film in the Sinhala cinema.

== Cast ==
- Kamal Addaraarachchi as Rohana Wijeweera
- Sulochana Weerasinghe as Chithrangani Wijeweera
- Jagath Manuwarna as Upatissa Gamanayake
- Sujeewa Priyalal as Somawansa Amarasinghe
- Susan Niroshan as Saman Piyasiri Fernando
- Priyantha Sirikumara as Lionel Bopage
- Jehan Sri Kanth as Sisira Randeniya
- Thusitha Laknath as Piyadasa Ranasinghe
- Sanjeeva Upendra as Sumith Athukorale
- Dilhani Ekanayake as Doctor's Wife
- Vishwajith Gunasekara as Doctor Jayathilake
- Deepani Silva as Rohana Wijeweera's Mother
- Prasannajith Abesuriya as H. N. Fernando, Chithrangani's brother
- Narada Thotagamuwa as D. M. Ananda
- Suraj Mapa as Vijitha Ranaweera
- Harsha Thennakoon as Dr Chandra
- Chandrasoma Binduhewa
- Hansamala Janaki
- Manjula Moragaha
- Anjana Premarathna
- Chinthaka Kulathunga
- Buddhika Jayaratne

== Production ==
The film is based on late Janatha Vimukthi Peramuna leader Rohana Wijeweera’s life, his comrades and political life until his death. Shooting took place in Ranminithenna Cinema Village, Haldummulla, Ulapane and locations around them. Filming started on 17 January 2017, where Addaraarachchi confirmed as the main protagonist role.

== Accolade ==
The film is one of the two films that were submitted for awards at the 91st Academy Awards. The film was first screened on 3 July 2018 at the National Film Corporation of Sri Lanka.

== Songs ==
The film consists of 2 songs.

No.	Title	Lyrics	Singer(s)	Length
1.	"Ane Ganadura"	Nayanananda Perera	Umariya Sinhawansa, Navaratne Gamage
2.	"Vimukthi song"	Chandrakumara Wickramaratne	Nadeeka Guruge and crew
