= Attack on the Magazine prison =

Prison riot in Sri Lanka

Magazine Prison Break
- Part of 1987-1989 JVP insurrection
- Type: Attack using small arms, and explosives; Prison break
- Location: Welikada, Sri Lanka; 6°55′19″N 79°52′49″E
- Planned by: Janatha Vimukthi Peramuna
- Target: Magazine Prison
- Objective: To free political prisoners and escalate conflict with the government
- Date: 13 December 1988
- Executed by: Deshapremi Janatha Viyaparaya
- Location within Central Colombo

The attack on the Magazine prison was an attack carried by Deshapremi Janatha Viyaparaya (Patriotic People's Movement), the armed wing of the JVP which was staging a rebellion within Sri Lanka.

== Background ==
In the late 1980s, the country was under a tense situation with two insurgencies ravaging northern and southern parts of Sri Lanka. The first insurgency was initiated by Liberation Tigers of Tamil Eelam (LTTE) and several Tamil militant groups in 1983, seeking to create an independent Tamil state in the northern and eastern parts of the country. In 1987, neighboring India intervened in the conflict to bring an end to the fighting between the insurgents and the Sri Lankan armed forces. That year, the Indo-Sri Lanka Accord was signed between the two countries and Indian Peace Keeping Force was deployed in northern Sri Lanka to enforce disarmament of militant organizations and to watch over the regional council.

JVP and other radical groups viewed this as a proliferation of Indian expansionism. This suspicion was fuelled by the perceived threat of northeastern autonomy, due to the presence of Indian Army in Sri Lankan soil. By this time, JVP was equipped with experiences of a failed insurrection in 1971, against the government of Sirimavo Bandaranaike. Under these circumstances, the party launched a second insurrection in 1987, seeking to overthrow the then United National Party government.

== Prison break ==
JVP attacked the prison on 13 December 1988 seeking to free prisoners and increase the hostility within the country to "heat up" the rebellion. This was one of the notable attacks carried out by the DJV led by Saman Piyasiri Fernando. After the insurgency, the JVP was criticized for this attack alongside many others.

The attack was carried on by 3 armed men with a Type 56 assault rifle and two magazines of ammo near one. The other two was holding explosives.

With the attack, 170 members of the JVP escaped the prison. The prison was holding 320 LTTE members as well as members of various other militant groups. This also included Douglas Devananda.

== Aftermath ==
In 2001 the attack was an allegation by opposing parties to the JVP while they denied active involvement. They claimed the Deshpremi Janatha Viyaparaya was an independent group - operated separately. Some of its major leaders like Kosala claimed direct responsibility on the attacks including the 1987 Bogambara prison attack.
