= H. B. Herath =

Sri Lankan politician and JVP military leader (1954–1989)

H. B. Herath එච්. බී. හේරත්

Member of Central Committee of Janatha Vimukthi Peramuna
- In office 1983–1989
- Leader: Rohana Wijeweera

Personal details
- Born: Kalubowila Kumarasinghe Mudiyanselage Herath Bandaage Herath; 24 June 1954 Medawachchiya, Sri Lanka
- Died: 13 November 1989 (aged 35) Borella, Sri Lanka
- Party: Janatha Vimukthi Peramuna
- Education: Poonewa Vidyalaya
- Occupation: Politician, military leader

Kalubowila Kumarasinghe Mudiyanselage Herath Bandaage Herath (24 June 1954 – 13 November 1989: Sinhala: එච්. බී. හේරත්), popularly known as H. B. Herath, was a Sri Lankan political activist who was killed by army forces. He was a member of the JVP party in the period 1983–1989.

== Family background and early life ==
He was born on 24 June 1954, in Medawachchiya, Anuradhapura, Sri Lanka as the second child among his 15 siblings. His father Punchiralage Herath Banda was an employee of the Medawachchiya post office as well as a farmer in Medawachchiya who owned about 50 acres of land and a large herd of cattle. His paternal grandfather was Kalubowila Kumarasinghe Mudiyanselage Punchiralage Herath Banda and paternal grandmother was Mudalihamige Ranmenike. His mother Kadirathege Amarawathie, born on June 20, 1937, was a resident of Usgalwewa, Lower Kebithigollewa. His parents married on March 10, 1951. H. B. Herath had 10 sisters and four brothers. The eldest is Sathyapala, then the third is Dharmakeerthi. The others were Swarna, Sisira, Sivasal, Sita, Sepalika, Rupa, Sujatha, Suranika, Chandrika, Sayuranga, Ravindra and Samurdhi. Five of them are graduates.

He first went to school at Medawachchiya Kadawathgama Kanishta Vidyalaya and then completed secondary education from Poonewa Vidyalaya. He entered Medawachchiya Maha Vidyalaya in 1972 to study for the GCE Ordinary Level and became the head prefect of the school in 1974. He excelled volleyball and athletics during school and later won first place in all school speech competitions and once second and third places in all island speech competitions. The first volleyball team was formed at the Medawachchiya Thisbambe Volleyball Ground under H.B.'s leadership. He also started the United Funeral Aid Society, the village funeral home, on November 13, 1975.

After passing the GCE Advanced Level Examination until the entrance to the university, H. B. worked as a Development Officer for nearly a year in 1975 in the Hunger Eradication Program at the Medawachchiya Assistant Government Agent's Office. In 1976, he entered the Faculty of Arts, University of Sri Jayawardanapura and later graduated in 1980. He was the second from his village Kadawathgama in Medawachchiya to graduate from a university in Sri Lanka. Ranasinghe was the first to enter the university in 1975 from the village. As a university student, he held the post of convener of the Inter-University Students Federation (IUSF).

Herath's girlfriend was an assistant lecturer at the University of Sri Jayewardenepura. She was arrested by the security forces in 1988 and detained by the Athurugiriya Police where the students also staged a protest demanding her release. After the release, she received a scholarship to Canada. Although she asked H. B. to marry her and go abroad with her, he declined due to his political life. She later left Sri Lanka in late 1988 and by 2018, she is serving as a senior official at the United Nations in the United States.

== Political career ==
After graduation, H. B. Herath entered politics full time. The Socialist Students' Union won the power of the Faculty of Management at Jayawardanapura University in 1978. By 1979, the JVP had won power in all universities under Shantha Bandara, D. M. Ananda and H. B. He also became the General Secretary of the JVP Socialist Students Union. In 1981, he participated for a discussion with Prof. Stanley Wijesundera, Chairman of the University Grants Commission, against the Education White Paper with other JVP union activists. Later, he became the president of the Jayewardenepura University Students' Union and was later the Convener of the Inter University Student Federation from March 1981 to January 1982.

In 1981, The Union organized a large rally at Hyde Park against the proposed white paper. The union crew surrounded the parliamentary building with participation of 5,000 people against the White Paper in late 1981 and was also brutally attacked by the police. Meanwhile, H.B. got injured in Colombo attacks during the protests in front of Parliament against the Education White Paper on January 20, 1982. In 1982, when the JVP's leader Rohana Wijeweera contested the presidential election, Herath acted as one of the main campaign organizers. An eloquent speaker and a good organizer, he rose through the party ranks quickly. In 1983, he was believed to be promoted to the political bureau when several high ranking politburo members resigned after the JVP was banned.

He was later appointed to the JVP Central Committee in 1984 and joined the Politburo during the Second Resurrection. He was the political and military leader who had been in the North Central Province for several years during the second uprising, including the Polonnaruwa, Anuradhapura and Trincomalee districts. He later became the political and military leader of the Uva East region including Badulla, Moneragala and Ampara districts. After Wimalaratne's assassination, the trade union also came under his control. He was arrested in Ganemulla in 1985 and Badulla in 1987 while campaigning for the JVP but was released. His house in Galawilawatte, Homagama was raided by the security forces in June 1988 but he managed to escape. At the time he was known as Michael and Vipula. In 1987, he was active in the events such as May day celebration in 1987 defying the government ban and demonstrations against the Indo-Sri Lanka Accord signed on 29 July. Herath was spotted on July 28, 1987, at 11 am near Fort Na Tress where he addressed more than ten thousand protesters against the agreement, stood on a wall.

Meanwhile, Herath's house and brother's house were set on fire in March 1989 by security forces. A brother was released from the Pelawatta camp without charge for two years. The whole family returned to home in 1992. H. B. was arrested by the security forces on November 12, 1989, and subjected to brutal torture. It was later brought to the Offshore Combine headquarters in Havelock Place. He was arrested together with Piyadasa Ranasingha, another JVP poilitibureau member, at Araliya Estate in Galaha. Information about Rohana Wijeweera's hideout in Ulapane was obtained by the government while they were in captivity. At the time of arrest of Wijeweera, Herath was in one of the vehicles used for the operation. While Wijeweera was under interrogation at Army headquarters in Colombo, an eyewitness reported seeing Herath, apparently tortured, in another room of the building. Herath was shot dead by security forces at around 1.40 am on November 13, 1989, near a ditch at No. 6, Golf Course, Model Farm Road, Borella. About 5 minutes earlier at 1.35 am JVP leader Wijeweera was killed on the spot. Their remains were cremated at 3.13 am on the same day at the Borella Cemetery. The only evidence that H. B. Herath and Rohana Wijeweera were burnt in the gas stove is the receipt No. 68302 issued by the caretaker of the cemetery which is under the control of the Colombo Municipal Council. The ledger number it mentions is 88268.

The government offered a different story, stating that Herath opened fire in Gampola, and was shot and killed by army commandos at around 1.40 am on November 13, 1989.

== Bibliography ==
- Rohan Gunarathna (1990), Sri Lanka, a lost revolution, Institute of fundamental studies ISBN 955-26-0004-9
- C. A. Chandraprema (1991) Sri Lanka, The Years of Terror- The JVP insurrection 1987-1989, Lake House Bookshop, ISBN 955-9029-03-7
