= Shantha Bandara =

Sri Lankan politician (1951-1990)

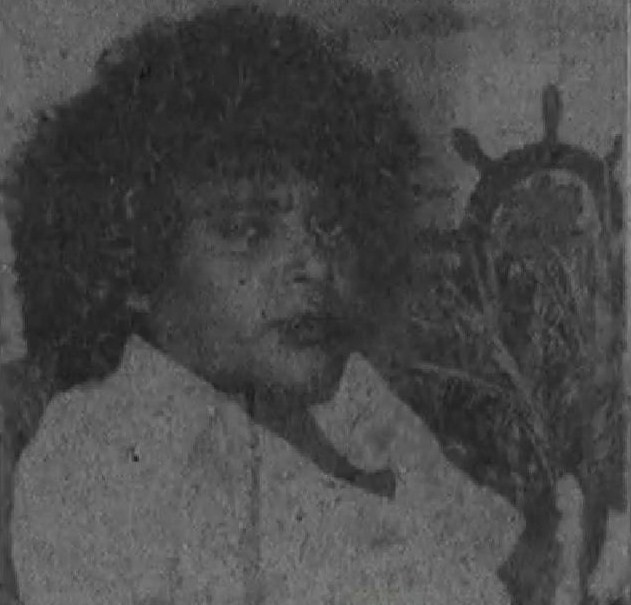
- Political party: Janatha Vimukthi Peramuna
- Military service
- Allegiance: Patriotic People's Front (Sri Lanka)
- Rank: Commander

Shantha Bandara alias Mahanama (1951−1990) was the first convenor of the Inter University Students' Federation (IUSF) and a key leader of Janatha Vimukthi Peramuna, a Marxist-Leninist political party in Sri Lanka. He was killed in January 1990.

== Student activism ==
Shantha Bandara was a student at University of Sri Lanka, Peradeniya campus when he started his political career joining the Samaja Adhyayana Kavaya (Social Studies Circle) of the university. He was instrumental in creating the Inter University Students' Federation (IUSF) - a major university student union in Sri Lanka - in 1978. He also led a protest against the prevailing United National Party government in 1979. Bandara did not complete his degree.

== JVP and insurgency 1987−1989 ==
He joined Janatha Vimukthi Peramuna in 1977. After becoming the leader of southern region, he headed the list of candidates of JVP at the Colombo Municipal Council elections. Bandara was a key leader of the unsuccessful JVP insurrection during 1987−1989. He led an unsuccessful attack on Wadduwa Army Camp and many other clandestine operations. In 1988, he was arrested on suspicion at Beliatta. At the time of the arrest, he was ranked No.9 in the JVP hierarchy. He tried unsuccessfully to bribe the guards, but was released four months later on the promise to cease violence and bring about a settlement. But he reneged on his promise. Eventually, he was killed by the armed forces in January 1990.

== See also ==
- Inter University Students' Federation
- Janatha Vimukthi Peramuna
- 1987–89 JVP Insurrection
