= Mattegoda =

Coordinates: 6°49′N 79°58′E

Mattegoda is a town in Western Province, Sri Lanka. It is located a short distance south-east of Colombo. It is well known for the housing scheme situated in there. The nearest major town is Kottawa.

== History ==
Mattegoda has been an underdeveloped area with mainly coconut estates until the then government built a housing scheme in the late 1980s. This dramatically increased the population and turned the sparsely populated area to a small town. Today Mattegoda is a very popular residential area for middle-class and upper-middle-class families due to its close proximity to Colombo and relative quiet and peaceful atmosphere.

== Location ==
The closest big town is Kottawa on the high level road which is about 3 km away. Mattegoda also connects to Polgasowita junction on the Colombo-Horana road.

== Government ==
Mattegoda belongs to the Homagama Divisional Secretariat.

== Demographics ==
The population of Mattegoda was mainly due to the housing scheme. But in the last decade increasing number of people have moved in and today is very much populated by a mixture of working class, middle and upper-middle-class families. In addition a lot of artists (Singers, actors etc.) live in Mattegoda in housing given by the government. Also Mattegoda is home to a Sri Lanka Army camp.

The population is mainly Sinhalese with a small Malay population. Most Sinhalese are Buddhist while a significant minority is Catholic. There are several Buddhist temples in and around Mattegoda. The Catholics have the St Jude's Catholic church which belong to the Pannipitiya parish. There is also a sizable Muslim population which includes Malays. Mattegoda has a small mosque.

== Economy ==
Mattegoda is mainly a residential area. The main economic activity is retail and other service sectors. The Alpha factory complex which manufactures metal furniture is a key employer in the area. Also there is a small garment factory. Arpico factory can be found near the Mattegoda Army Camp.

== Transport ==
Public bus service is available connecting Mattegoda to Colombo. The route number is 138/2 and it takes the high level road. In addition the 342 route number buses from Kottawa to Piliyandala also pass through Mattegoda. The Southern express way is also accessible from Mattegoda by Kottawa and Kahatuduwa exit points.

== Education ==
There is a small government run school just outside Mattegoda and the closest schools are in Kottawa and Pannipitiya towns. Most school children in Mattegoda attend schools in Colombo.

== Banking and Finance ==
A Sampath Bank branch is located in Mattegoda Also branches of BOC, Commercial and Peoples Banks are located.

== Communication ==
Mattegoda has good wireless mobile coverage from most mobile operators in Sri Lanka. A Sri Lanka Telecom station is also located providing fixed telephone connections. Mattegoda also has a post office.

== Notable people ==
- Rookantha Gunathilaka (Singer)
- Dennis Perera (Film Director, Dramatist)
- Prasanna Vithanage (Film Director)
