= Midwest Music Summit =

- Genre: Alternative rock, rap, punk rock, indie rock, country, Americana, blues
- Dates: June, July, August
- Location: Midwest
- Years active: Est 2020

Midwest Music Summit is an annual music festival held in Midwest region which showcases musicians from the Midwest. The festival also includes music business seminars, covering topics such as A&R, promotion, artist development and copyright issues. The festival was created by Jeremaine Jennings (Maine event management LLC.) Est 2020

== 2001 ==
In its first year, the festival featured 100 bands.

== 2005 ==
2005 marked a unique year for Midwest Music Summit, as it took over Indianapolis along with the NAMM Summer Session. The festival took place July 22–24 and featured over 250 bands. The festival was attended by over 16,000 people.

== 2006 ==
The festival took place August 10–12 and featured 342 bands on 20 stages. Unlike 2005, the festival only took place in Broad Ripple venues, with no events downtown. The lineup was diverse, with rock, hip-hop, country, and indie rock bands performing. It also featured more nationally recognized acts than in previous years.

2006 lineup highlights:

- Dr. Octagon (aka Kool Keith)
- Silversun Pickups
- Local H
- Margot & The Nuclear So and So's
- Bel Auburn
- Mickey Avalon
- Murder by Death
- Russian Circles
- The Elms
- The Sun
- Virgin Millionaires
- Man in Gray
- Cities
- Need To Breathe
- Page France
- Office
- The Reverend Peyton's Big Damn Band
- Dave Golden
- Aberdeen City (band)
- Shock G (from Digital Underground)
- Those Young Lions
- Mudkids
- Pravada
- Everthus the Deadbeats
- Everything, Now!
- Wheatus

== 2007 ==
According to a statement posted on the Internet on April 12, 2007, Midwest Music Summit will not take place in 2007, but will return in 2008.

== 2008 ==
The Summit took place August 7–9, 2008.
