= Scumbag (film) =

2017 black comedy film

- Artwork by D.J. Rabiola licensed to World Domination Pictures Inc. (user)
- Directed by: Mars Roberge
- Written by: Mars Roberge
- Produced by: Tamas Birinyi Eric Ragan
- Starring: Princess Frank; Debra Haden; Nick Zedd; Michael Alig; Nina Hartley; Lauren Parkinson; Scott E. Myers; Ryan Beard; Keith Morris; Monique Parent; Angelo Moore; Camille Waldorf
- Cinematography: Marco Tomaselli
- Edited by: Mars Roberge
- Music by: Lionel Cohen
- Production company: World Domination Pictures
- Distributed by: Freestyle Releasing North America Ourscreen U.K.
- Release dates: February 2, 2017 (International Film Festival Rotterdam); May 1, 2018 (North America)
- Running time: 114 minutes
- Country: United States Canada
- Language: English

Scumbag is a 2017 Canadian-American film by the filmmaker Mars Roberge about Phil, a young DJ who works at a telemarketing company where his co-workers are lunatics, former convicts and junkies. The film stars Princess Frank and Debra Haden with an ensemble cast of underground legends.

== Plot ==
The film follows a young aspiring DJ, Phil, played by Princess Frank, who takes on a day job at a telemarketing company to make ends meet but has to fight for his life and his girlfriend Christine, played by Debra Haden, while keeping up with his co-workers who consist of crazy people, ex-prisoners, drug addicts and murderers. The action of the movie takes place in the 1990s.

== Cast ==
Scumbag has an extensive cast with 220 roles.

- Princess Frank as Phil
- Debra Haden as Christine
- Nick Zedd as Brian
- Michael Alig as Cody
- Ron Jeremy as himself
- Nina Hartley as Wanda
- Keith Morris as John Stevens
- Angelo Moore as Kirk
- Don Bolles as Ted
- Kid Congo Powers as Johnny
- Jael de Pardo as Jessica
- Cindy Lucas as Tiffany
- Goddess Bunny as Gina
- D.H. Peligro as Frustrated Driver 1
- Tom Silverman as Robert
- Penny Arcade as Lydia
- Howie Pyro as Fred
- En Esch as himself
- Jeffrey Wengrofsky as Subway Passenger 1
- Michael Musto as Subway Passenger 2
- Scott E Myers as Ryan
- Ryan Beard as Cornelius
- Spookey Ruben as Junior
- Camille Waldorf as Megan
- Lauren Parkinson as Porsche
- Red Brady as Elmo
- Stephen Winders as "Hardcore"
- Tim Truman as Walter Pigman
- Andrew Davis II as "Snoop"
- Brennan Keel Cook as Stuart
- Aaron Tyler Rosenberg as Tyler
- Derrick Williams as Joe
- Matt Stoner as Travis
- Srinivasa Kapavarapu as Ray
- Michael Anthony Ibarra as Mike
- Michael Francesco as William
- Kosha Dillz as Charles
- Kate McKay as Tara
- Vanessa Lake as Sam
- Monique Parent as Susan Stevens
- Gregory "G-Spot" Siebel as Gay Bartender
- Neon Musíc as "Hot Mess"
- Gasper Gray as Russ
- John McDermott as Tony
- Sydney Viengluang as Stephanie
- Eric Carr as Jake
- Matthew Spalding as Mr. Davis
- Jonathan Stanton as Police Officer 1
- Devonric Johnson as Police Officer 2
- DJ Keoki as Javier
- Karmia Amarissa as Maria
- Matthew Spalding as Mr. Davis
- Jennifer Finch as Punk Wife

== Production ==
=== Writing ===
Scumbag was originally inspired by Roberge's thesis script, "Smog", for the undergraduate Film Production program at York University in 1995, with research dating as early as 1989. "Smog" focused mainly on the DJ aspects of Scumbag, where the main character works as a Goth music DJ in Toronto. However, the script takes on a new form after Mars took a real telemarketing job in 1995 where he "purposely put himself in a crazy situation so that one day he could write about it". "Doing extensive research on insanity, drugs and partying, Mars falls into a dark spiral where he almost doesn't come back, opting out of a film career to become an S & M dj for 20 years, which eventually leads him to NYC where he finds recovery. The first draft of "Scumbag" was finished in 2009 but registered with the WGA in 2014 because Mars was sidetracked with moving across the country, a failed marriage, as well touring with an award-winning documentary he made called "The Little House That Could".

=== Pre-production ===
The casting for Scumbag was done by the director, Mars Roberge, starting in 2013 with remaining role auditions being held in 2014 at Cazt Studios in Los Angeles after placing advertisements in Backstage, Breakdown Express and Craigslist. Roberge wanted to cast actors who lived the identical parts offscreen or at least resembled the actual people who influenced the creations. This led to many non-actors being cast in roles. Many other roles were pulled from popular underground musicians and porn stars. Ron Jeremy ended up in the movie just by showing up to set one night. During casting, many celebrities were approached by Roberge such as Ringo Starr, Steven Tyler, Jerry Mathers, Pee Wee Herman and even some such as Peter Murphy ended up on the cutting room floor for the final version.

The 1990s wardrobe styling was primarily done by Karmia Amarissa with the exception for a few actors from the East Coast location. Many of the actors took clothes directly from their own wardrobes.

Scumbag was self-funded Roberge after raising a low initial amount by crowdfunding through Indiegogo which is the main reason the movie took a year to shoot.

=== Filming ===
Principal photography for Scumbag began on 25 January 2015, in New York City at Nomad Editing Company's old office on 12 W. 21st St (12th floor) under Roberge's film production company, World Domination Pictures. After the first shooting day, the rest of the film was shot in Los Angeles from 12 February to 5 December 2015. Originally, the entire film was going to be shot in Los Angeles but Michael Alig's parole officer informed him that he was not allowed to leave New York State in order to not violate his release so World Domination Pictures had to set up a cast and crew on both coasts. Many scenes have actors speaking back and forth across in the main office that have never actually met each other because they are either in a Manhattan office or a Burbank office. The production also shot 3 days over schedule to make up for a main actor that was replaced two-thirds into shooting the movie. Red Brady was the replacement actor for Elmo and spent most of his shooting time acting by himself, visually inserted into scenes that were previously shot. Scumbag was filmed using the Black Magic Production camera in 4K raw with most of the scenes being shot simultaneously by two cameras.

=== Post-production ===
Scumbag was edited by Roberge over the course of eight months at Nomad Editing Company in Santa Monica using Adobe Premiere CC. Roberge was also the sound designer and synced all the rushes manually by eye. Every month when a new scene was shot, he would edit the entire scene the following week so that it would be ready before the following shoot day. This helped when an actor had to be replaced during the shooting. Color-correction was also done at Nomad Editing Company in Santa Monica by Flame artist Josh Kirschenbaum.

The audio for Scumbag was mixed in Toronto at Musique Corazon Studio and Blue Sound and Music, with ADR re-recording done at Soundesign in Los Angeles. Voice overs were done at Nomad Editing Company in Santa Monica which included Kate Hudson's new husband, Danny Fujikawa, and the official voice of iPhone, Glenn Martin.

== Release ==
Scumbag had its world premiere at the 46th International Film Festival Rotterdam on 2 February 2017. Roberge, cast members Debra Haden and Camille Waldorf, along with the soundtrack artist Linda Lamb, were present for this, engaging with the audience after the film. It then had its North American premiere in the Museum of the Moving Image on 18 March 2017 for Queens World Film Festival] with an introduction from the Emmy Award-winning Sex and the City stylist, Patricia Field.

Scumbag was selected by 18 film festivals, touring the film festival circuit with the most recent festival screening taking place on May 24, 2020 at Lower East Side Festival of the Arts held at Theater for the New City in New York City.

Scumbag was released theatrically by OurScreen in the U.K. on 18 May 2018, with the U.K. premiere held at VUE Piccadilly, hosted with a cast Q & A from Bruno Wizard of the punk band The Homosexuals. Scumbag cast member Ryan Beard answered questions from the audience.

Since the shutdown of Distrify, Scumbag was re-released outside of North America on November 30, 2021 on Vimeo on Demand.

== Reception ==
Scumbag has had mixed reviews where audiences either love or hate the movie, there is no middle ground. Scumbag has been called a "must see cult film" by World of Wonder while the China publication The Polysh says "you may hate the filmmaker for making you walk on mine bombs that go against public morales". Scumbag was selected as the Pick of the Week by LA Weekly in March 2018. Film Threat calls it "The Office unhinged, mixed with Mulholland Drive, mixed with Spinal Tap, plus some inexplicable surveillance footage". Because of the extreme responses, Scumbag has quickly developed a cult following from fans who call themselves "scumbags".

== Accolades ==
In 2017, Scumbag won Best Feature Comedy at Philadelphia Independent Film Festival and Best Ensemble Narrative Feature at Queens World Film Festival, beating Adam Green's Aladdin starring Macaulay Culkin, Nicole LaLiberte, Leo Fitzpatrick, Zoë Kravitz and Har Mar Superstar. Michael Alig stars in Scumbag but his personal life was portrayed by Macaulay Culkin in the 2003 cult film Party Monster, so the Best Ensemble Award is an example of reality beating Hollywood. Scumbag's lead actors, Princess Frank and Debra Haden, also won Exceptional Emerging Artist / Best Composing at Hollywood Film Festival in 2017.

Year	Film festival	Category	Recipient	Result
2017	Chinese American Film Festival	Golden Angel Award		Nominated
2017	Hollywood Film Festival	Best Feature Film		Nominated
2017	Hollywood Film Festival	Exceptional Emerging Artist Composer	Debra Haden, Princess Frank	Won
2017	Philadelphia Independent Film Festival	Best Actor	Princess Frank	Nominated
2017	Philadelphia Independent Film Festival	Best Feature Comedy		Won
2017	Philadelphia Independent Film Festival	Best Feature Film		Nominated

== Themes ==
Scumbag deals with very serious themes: drug addiction, death, domestic abuse, pedophilia, spirituality, racism, anti-semitism, transgender identification, respect for minorities in the police force, Quebec separatism, illegal immigration from Mexico, Canadian-American relations, autism, the existence of God, sadomasochism, Satanism, prostitution, bullying, cultural appropriation, feminism, homelessness, homophobia, the economy, crime and political correctness. These issues are often broken up by comic relief from Elmo who speaks of humorous nonsensical flashbacks as well as with musical numbers throughout the film. Scumbag has been called an "intelligent film about stupid people".

== Music ==
To help promote the release of Scumbag, two music videos were released, both directed and edited by Roberge, containing footage from the film as well as the artist singing the track within the film: "Delicate Boy" performed by Camille Waldorf and "Do Me" performed by En Esch.

Most of the music in Scumbag was provided by actors from the film (Scott E Myers, Princess Frank, Debra Haden, Camille Waldorf, Spookey Ruben, Keith Morris' group Off!, Aaron Tyler Rosenberg, etc.) or by Roberge's various music projects (The Millionaires, Rise NYC, Tulips for Tina) or people directly connected to Roberge either through his years as a DJ or from working as a stylist at Patricia Field's in New York. This included several unreleased songs such as "Gothic Boy" written by Die J! Mars with the vocals of Jim Sclavunos (Nick Cave & the Bad Seeds) and Nomi (ex-Hercules and Love Affair), as well as "Not Enough" written by Steve Strange (Visage) and Philip Anthony Gable featuring Alejandro GoCast. The score was written by Lionel Cohen who also scored Roberge's first feature, The Little House That Could.

The lead actors, Princess Frank and Debra Haden, wrote and recorded the song "Is this Real?" which they perform in Scumbag. It won Exceptional Emerging Artist / Best Composing at the 2017 Hollywood Film Festival. Their performance was choreographed by Raquel Medina who plays Lana (Ryan's girlfriend) in Scumbag.
