= The Man in Grey (disambiguation) =

The Man in Grey is a 1943 British film melodrama.

The Man in Grey or The Man in Gray may also refer to:

- The Man in Grey (novel), a 1941 novel by Lady Eleanor Smith
- The Man in Grey (short story collection), a 1918 short story collection by Baroness Orczy
- The Man in Gray, a 1961 Italian short documentary film
- The Man in Gray, a 1921 historical novel by Thomas Dixon Jr.
- Man in Gray, an American noise rock band

== See also ==
- Momo (novel), also known as The Men in Grey, a 1973 fantasy novel by Michael Ende
