= Janatha Vimukthi Peramuna =

Political party in Sri Lanka

People's Liberation Front ජනතා විමුක්ති පෙරමුණ மக்கள் விடுதலை முன்னணி
- Abbreviation: PLF (English) ජවිපෙ (JVP) (Sinhala) மவிமு (MVM) (Tamil)
- Leader: Anura Kumara Dissanayake
- General Secretary: Tilvin Silva
- Founder: Rohana Wijeweera
- Founded: 14 May 1965 (61 years ago)
- Split from: Ceylon Communist Party–Peking Wing
- Preceded by: New Left Movement
- Headquarters: 464/20 Pannipitiya Road, Pelawatta, Battaramulla, Sri Lanka
- Newspaper: Niyamuva (Sinhala); Sensakhti (Tamil); Red Power (English); Deshapalana Vivarana (Sinhala)
- Student wing: Socialist Students Union
- Youth wing: Socialist Youth Union
- Women's wing: Socialist Women's Union
- Relief Service Force: රතු තරුව/சிவப்பு நட்சத்திரம் (Red Star)
- Armed Wing: Deshapremi Janatha Vyaparaya (1986–1991)
- Membership: ▲200,000–300,000 (1983)
- Ideology: Communism; Marxism–Leninism; Anti-imperialism; Progressivism; Anti-neoliberalism; Historical: Left-wing nationalism; Sinhalese nationalism
- Political position: Left-wing to far-left
- National affiliation: National People's Power
- Colors: Red
- Anthem: අන්තර්ජාතිකය (Sinhala) சர்வதேசம் (Tamil) "The Internationale"
- Parliament of Sri Lanka: 159 / 225
- Sri Lankan Provincial Councils: 266 / 341
- Local Government: 3,942 / 7,842

Election symbol
- Bell

Party flag

Website
- www.jvpsrilanka.com/english/

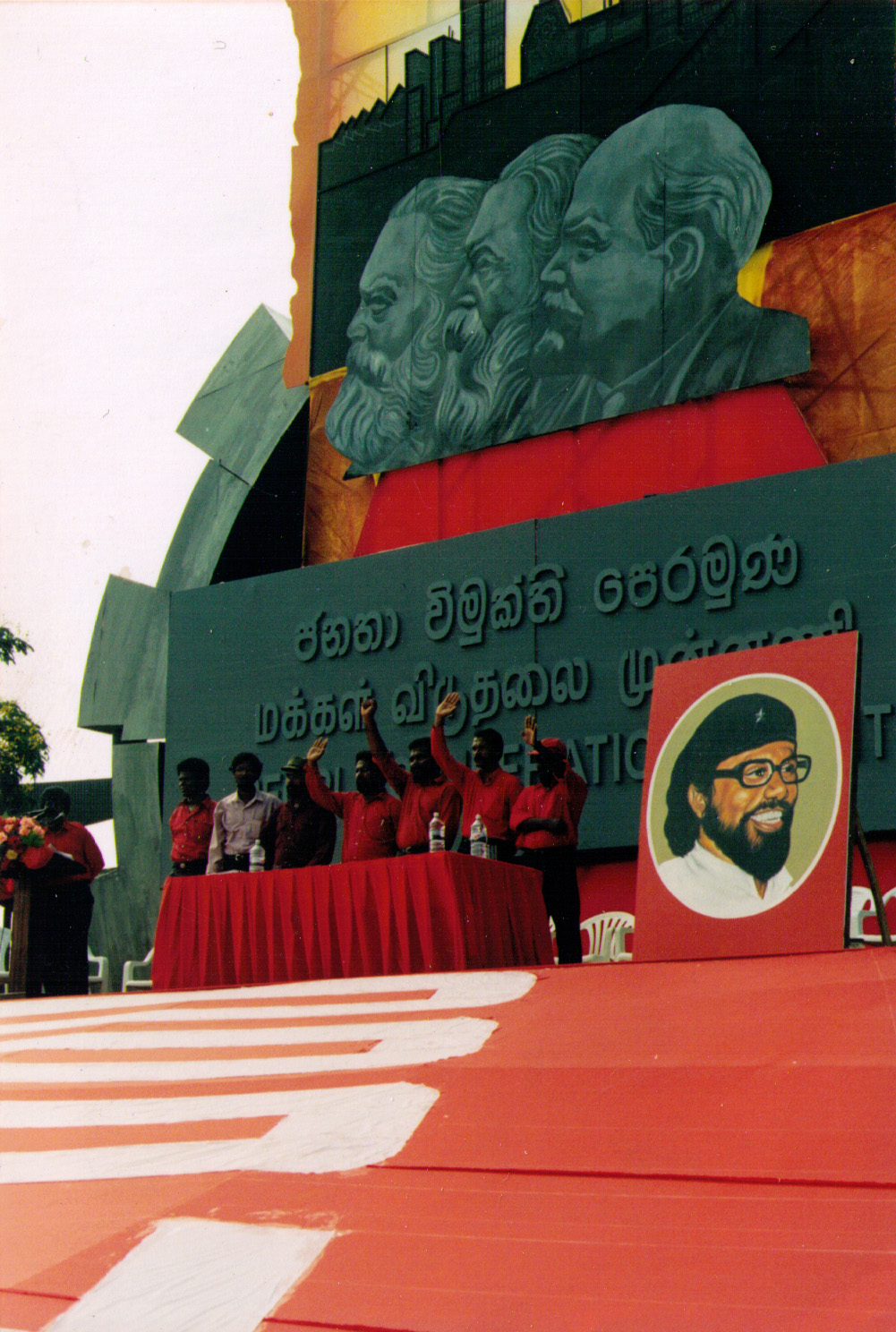
Janatha Vimukthi Peramuna leadership at May Day Celebration in Colombo in 1999

The Janatha Vimukthi Peramuna (Note: Sinhala: ජනතා විමුක්ති පෙරමුණ, romanized: Janatā Vimukti Peramuṇa; Tamil: மக்கள் விடுதலை முன்னணி, romanized: Makkaḷ Viṭutalai Muṉṉaṇi) (JVP; lit. 'People's Liberation Front', PLF) is a Marxist–Leninist political party in Sri Lanka. The party was formerly a revolutionary movement and was involved in two armed uprisings against the government of Sri Lanka: once in 1971 (SLFP), and another in 1987–1989 (UNP). The motive for both uprisings was to establish a socialist state. Since then the JVP has entered mainstream democratic politics and has updated its ideology, abandoning some of its original Marxist policies such as the abolition of private property, and moderating its rhetoric. The JVP has been led by President Anura Kumara Dissanayake since 2014.

The JVP was initially a small organisation that became a well-organised party that could influence mainstream politics. Its members openly campaigned for the left-wing coalition government of the SLFP-led United Front; however, following their disillusion with the coalition, they began an insurrection against the Dominion of Ceylon in early 1971. The JVP's military wing, the Red Guard, captured over 76 police strongholds throughout the island of Ceylon. (Note: 1971 JVP insurrection#Prelude; 1971 JVP insurrection#Insurrection)

The JVP entered democratic politics in 1977 when President J. R. Jayewardene released JVP leader Rohana Wijeweera from prison. Wijeweera contested in the 1982 presidential elections and was the third most successful candidate, winning 4.16% of the votes cast. Before the elections, he had been convicted by the Criminal Justice Commission (CJC) for conspiring to overthrow the state violently. The JVP launched a more organized insurrection for the second time in 1987 after the signing of the Indo-Sri Lanka Accord.

Following Operation Combine and Wijeweera's death, the JVP returned to elections as the National Salvation Front. The surviving JVP members campaigned in the 1994 elections, but eventually withdrew and supported the nationalist Sri Lanka Freedom Party, the main opposition party at the time. In 2004, it joined the government as a part of the United People's Freedom Alliance and supported the government in its war against the Liberation Tigers of Tamil Eelam (LTTE), but subsequently left the coalition government following disagreements over the 2002 ceasefire agreement and distribution of aid following the 2004 tsunami.

Since 2019, the JVP has contested elections under its own national coalition, the National People's Power (NPP) and has since been a prominent party in Sri Lankan politics. In the 2024 presidential election, JVP leader Anura Kumara Dissanayake was elected President of Sri Lanka. In the 2024 Sri Lankan parliamentary elections, the JVP led NPP alliance won with 159 seats in the parliament, winning a supermajority. It was the second-highest proportion of seats in the nation's history and the NPP succeeded in winning a majority of seats in every district except Batticaloa.

== History ==
The JVP was founded in 1965 to provide a leading force for a communist revolution in Sri Lanka. In 1965, there were four other leftist political parties in Sri Lanka: the Lanka Sama Samaja Party (LSSP), established in 1935 as the first political party in Sri Lanka; the Communist Party of Sri Lanka (CPSL), which broke away from the LSSP and formed their own party in 1943 due to differences of opinion on supporting Britain during the 2nd World War; the Mahajana Eksath Peramuna (MEP); and the Peking Left.

Since the country's independence, the two main parties, the United National Party (UNP) and the Sri Lanka Freedom Party (SLFP), governed the country for eight years each, and the country's economic outlook worsened. According to the JVP's founders, neither party had been able to implement even a single measure to resolve the crisis. The JVP considered the entry of three leftist parties into the United Front in 1964 as a conscious betrayal of the aspirations of the people and the working class. Inflation, unemployment, and food prices increased despite government efforts to prevent it.

=== Rohana Wijeweera ===
Rohana Wijeweera's father was a political activist of the CPSL. During an election campaign in the 1960s, he was severely assaulted by UNP members and was paralysed; Wijeweera was likely emotionally affected, which may have changed his views and caused his hatred against the UNP. When Wijeweera's further education was threatened as a result of his father's incapacitation, the CPSL arranged a scholarship for him to study medicine at the Patrice Lumumba Friendship University in Moscow, where he read the works of Karl Marx, Friedrich Engels, and Lenin, and became a committed Marxist.

==== Effects of the Sino–Soviet split ====
By this time, the United Socialist Party (USP) was divided into two factions: the Chinese faction and the Soviet faction. Wijeweera broke away from the CPC which was aligned with the USSR and joined the Ceylon Communist Party (Maoist).

After a visit to Sri Lanka in 1964, he was not permitted to return to the USSR: his student activism in favour of Maoism while in Moscow displeased the Russians. The Chinese faction was led by Premalal Kumarasiri. Through his father's political activities, Wijeweera contacted Kumarasiri and joined the party's staff and became part of the trade union office.

==== Split ====
Wijeweera increasingly felt that the leftist movement in Sri Lanka (generally referred to in Sri Lanka as the "old left") that existed until then had not produced enough professional revolutionaries and had never made a meaningful effort to educate the masses on Marxism. Workers accepted the words mouthed by the leaders of the "old left" as the final word. He also believed that the leadership of the "old left", aware of this aspect, utilised it to the fullest to blunt workers' militancy. Wijeweera and others decided in mid-1965 to launch a new party that was explicitly revolutionary in character; it was formed without breaking off from other established parties. The cadres engaged themselves in political activities that consisted mainly of trying to increase the political awareness of the working class.

==== Five classes ====
Wijeweera felt that one of the more important tasks was to educate the masses politically. After deliberating on the issue, it was decided that an uncomplicated Marxist analysis of the socio-politico-economic problems of the country should be the introductory step. The Marxist analysis was split into five discussions along with five main themes.

Throughout the rest of 1968, Wijeweera traveled across the country, conducting political classes for the members of the party. An education camp followed the five basic political classes. Precautions had to be taken to keep this educational camp a secret to avoid alarming the government and the "old left". All conducted by Wijeweera, the classes stretched from 17 to 18 hours a day, interrupted only by meals.

By 1971, the JVP established itself as a political party and offered an alternative to those disillusioned with the politics of the other left organizations. Most of the members and supporters of the JVP at the time were young adults. Alarmed at the JVP's political potential and challenge, the government and its leftist allies levelled a variety of slander against it. Many representatives of the "old left" called the JVP members "CIA agents attempting to overthrow the pro-Eastern bloc party".

==== Building cells ====
JVP built cells in multiple countries, including South Yemen, Belgium, the UK, and Ba'athist Iraq; South Yemen also promised to hold some weapon supplies; although the manufacturer later said that there was no possible way to supply weapons, the government congratulated the organisation with a letter that read "Revolutionary Greetings".

=== 1971 insurgency ===
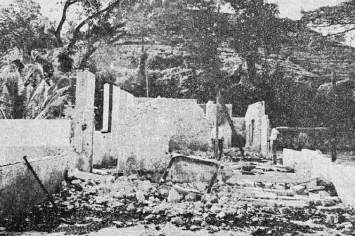
A police station in ruins after an insurgent attack. JVP in total destroyed 75 police stations similarly.

The 1971 uprising led by the JVP was unsuccessful and allegedly claimed nearly 5,000 lives. The JVP drew worldwide attention when it launched an insurrection against the Bandaranaike government in April 1971. Although the insurgents were young, poorly armed, and inadequately trained, they seized and held major areas in the southern and central provinces of Sri Lanka before they were defeated by the security forces. Their attempt to seize power created a major crisis for the government and forced a fundamental reassessment of the nation's security needs. In March 1971, after an accidental explosion in one of the bomb factories, the police found fifty-eight bombs in a hut in Nelundeniya, Kegalle District. Shortly afterward, Wijeweera was arrested and sent to Jaffna Prison, where he remained throughout the revolt. In response to his arrest and the growing pressure of police investigations, other JVP leaders acted immediately, and started the uprising at 11:00 p.m. on 5 April. After two weeks of fighting, the government regained control of all but a few remote areas. In both human and political terms, the cost of the victory was high: an estimated 30,000 insurgents, according to the JVP, many of them in their teens, died in the conflict. The army and police were also widely perceived to have used excessive force. In order to win over an alienated population and to prevent a prolonged conflict, Bandaranaike offered amnesties in May and June 1971, and the top leaders were imprisoned. Wijeweera, who was already in detention at the time of the uprising, was given a twenty-year sentence.

=== Transition to democratic politics ===
The JVP was not recognised as a political party until its first uprising. The party rejected being a democratic party following the military coup and subsequent purge in Indonesia against the Indonesian Communist Party. It complained that the Ceylonese government would try to militarily defeat the group if it stopped arming itself. The government banned the JVP following an attack on the United States high commission in Ceylon. The government blamed the protests that led to the attack on the JVP members, but it was revealed that the attack was conducted by a Maoist organisation.

The brief conflict created turmoil in Sri Lanka's national politics and its international relations. Many countries were blamed for supporting the JVP, including the People's Republic of China and North Korea; China denied supporting the party. As a result of the insurgency, the UF government denounced the JVP in April 1971, and it became an underground organisation, though it participated in the 1978 local government elections.

After the 1978 elections, the organisation's reputation among revolutionaries decreased; however, the public began to recognise it, and it quickly gained members. In 1982 the JVP participated in the District Development Council (DDC) elections and the presidential elections; it was the only radical party that contested the DDC elections in 1982.

The UNP had introduced the District Development Council as a solution to the ethnic conflict. The Nava Sama Samaja Party (NSSP), CPSL, and the nationalistic SLFP boycotted the elections, but as the JVP contested, it won a couple of seats in the council's elections. Around this time, the Election Commission of Sri Lanka formally recognised the JVP as a legitimate political party.

==== Persecution of the United Front ====
In 1978, the UNP introduced commissions to charge United Front members for ignoring or violating human rights in events such as the humiliation, rape, and murder of Premawathie Manamperi. The UNP called JVP members to give evidence against the UF; the UF criticised the procedure, calling it capitalist. Afterwards, the UF members lost their civil ownership, and were not allowed to participate in the 1977 parliamentary elections. As a result, the Tamil United Liberation Front (TULF) became the main opposition in parliament, which the JVP vehemently opposed.

==== 1982 presidential election ====
In 1982, Wijeweera contested the presidential elections. The party expected to win more than 500,000 votes but won only 275,000. Although they received more votes than LSSP candidate Colvin R. de Silva, the party was disappointed by the results. The UNP government banned the party again, fearing the potential of a popular JVP.

==== 1983 ethnic riots ====
After the ethnic riots, the government denounced the JVP, CPSL, and NSSP claiming that the parties were involved in the Black July riots that killed thousands of Tamils and began the country's civil war. The proscription on the CPSL was lifted due to its Tamil representation, but the JVP continued to be banned.

=== 1987–1989 insurgency ===
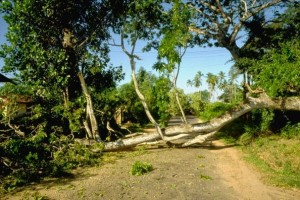
Trees felled across streets by the JVP as a disturbance to government supply

The Indian intervention through the Indo-Sri Lanka accord and the plan to divide the island led to the 1987–1989 revolt. The JVP exploited the arrival of the Indian Peace-keeping Force and the widespread nationalist sentiments of large sections of the Sinhalese people to terrorise both the state machinery and sections of civil society that opposed its thinking, which almost overpowered the state. Organised in multiple cells countrywide and mostly based around the capital Kandy in the centre, the JVP murdered probably thousands of people and crippled the country with violently enforced hartals (general strikes) for three years. Government forces captured and killed Wijeweera and his deputy in November 1989 in Colombo; by early 1990 they had killed or imprisoned the remaining JVP politburo and detained an estimated 7,000 suspected JVP members. Although the government won a decisive military victory, there were credible accusations of brutality and extrajudicial methods. The number of deaths during the insurgency is uncertain, as the government was also fighting Tamil insurgent groups at the time. Multiple official and unofficial forces and reports confirm that the death toll exceeded 60,000. In addition, many people took advantage of the chaos to instigate deadly local feuds.

What is certain is the methods of death, including necklacing, victims eviscerated and left to die, and even the occasion of eighteen heads arranged around the Alwis pond at the University of Peradeniya, which occurred the day after T.E. Nagahawatte, the Assistant Registrar of the university and a volunteer officer, was killed by two gunmen inside university premises. For genocide studies, it was an example of politicide that happened in a democratic regime, which resulted in the killing of at least 13,000 and 30,000 JVP members and its alleged supporters.

=== Return to democratic politics and third-party status (1994–2024) ===
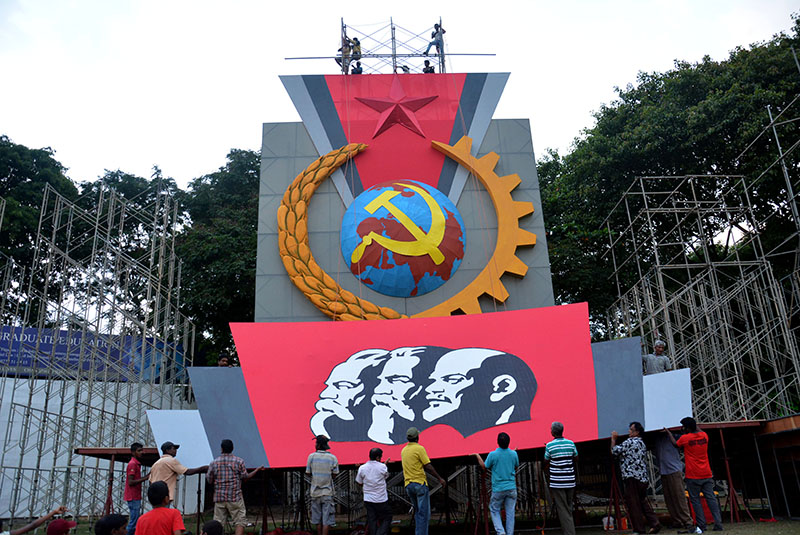
A banner set up for May Day celebrations

After JVP leadership was eliminated by state repression during the Premadasa government, it was resurrected as a political party joining the mainstream led by Somawansa Amerasinghe – the only surviving member of the decimated JVP politburo. However, the JVP had an internal conflict: JVP supported Chandrika Kumaranatunga's election campaign after withdrawing their candidate. The JVP contested the presidential elections in 1999 and their candidate Nandana Gunatilleke received 4.08% of the vote. The JVP contested under the National Salvation Front.

The high point of the JVP's electoral effort was at the legislative elections held on 2 April 2004. The party was part of the United People's Freedom Alliance which won 45.6% of the popular vote and 105 out of the 225 seats in Parliament. As the second-largest party of the coalition, it became part of the government with 39 Members of Parliament and three cabinet portfolios.

==== Post-tsunami violence ====
Shortly after the 2004 tsunami, the JVP believed the Sri Lankan government was seeking assistance from the Liberation Tigers of Tamil Eelam (LTTE). After multiple arguments, the JVP and Jathika Hela Urumaya (JHU; Sinhala National Heritage) protested against the peace involvement from Norway. Subsequently, Tamil journalist Dharman Sivaram was assassinated. The Therraputtabaya Brigade, unknown before, issued death threats to multiple other journalists, which included former JVP member Victor Ivan.

==== 2005 presidential election ====
In 2005, Mahinda Rajapaksa was elected president of Sri Lanka. Some political analysts believed that the majority of support and endorsement for Rajapaksa came from the JVP due to Rajapaksa's opposition to the LTTE peace process. A few analysts reject this idea, saying that JVP was too weak to make a significant impact on the country's national elections. Other independent intellectuals, like Dayan Jayatilleka, Nalin de Silva and Mohan Samaranayake, pointed out that Rajapaksa's agreement with the JVP ensured his victory.

==== Internal conflict in April 2008 ====
The party experienced internal conflict between the two factions of Wimal Weerawansa and the party leadership in April 2008. The party suspended Weerawansa's membership on 21 March 2008. Media reports said that Weerawansa had an argument with the leadership based on the disarmament of the Tamil Makkal Viduthalai Pulikal political party and paramilitary group, which was attempting to participate in the country's eastern provincial council elections to be held in May 2008 under the ruling United People's Freedom Alliance.

A member of the party, Piyasiri Wijenayake, accused the UNP of conspiring against the JVP at a media conference held at Nippon Hotel in Colombo on 8 April 2008. He alleged that Ravi Karunanayake, a UNP member who had attended a meeting with senior JVP leaders at his residence, was the main conspirator. Wijenayake told BBC that his and Achala Suranga Jagoda's vehicles were forcefully removed by the group led by Jayanatha Wijesekara, a Member of Parliament from the Trincomalee district.

Weerawansa's group visited the most senior Buddhist monks of Asgiriya and Malwatte chapters on 20 April 2008 to seek blessings for their new political movement. Weerawansa also accused the UNP Kotte leaders of the conspiracy against the JVP. Weerawansa's group then formed a new political party called the Jathika Nidahas Peramuna (JNP). Party activities began on 14 May 2008, the anniversary of the day Wijeweera had formed the JVP in 1965 and of the day the LTTE killed 146 pilgrims during the Anuradhapura massacre at the Sri Maha Bodhi in 1985. The party leaders said that the new political party was an alternative to the two main political parties, UNP and SLFP, but not the JVP. In December 2008, the JNP joined the government, and claimed that the government should be supported at this moment as it was successfully fighting the LTTE in the north of Sri Lanka. JVP politicians blamed the government, saying that it had mishandled many problems, and alleged that their rivals had joined the government for personal gain.

==== 2010 presidential and parliamentary elections ====
JVP formed a coalition with UNP to support Sarath Fonseka, the former army chief, in the 2010 presidential elections, but he was defeated by the incumbent, Mahinda Rajapaksa. After this, the UNP left the coalition and the JVP contested the general elections along with Sarath Fonseka's factions under the banner of Democratic National Alliance. During the subsequent elections, the alliance won 7 seats, of which 4 were won by JVP candidates. The party had 39 seats before the elections.

==== Internal conflict in April 2012 ====
The party had a schism in 2012 when a group of members left the party to make the new Frontline Socialist Party (FLSP). Although the FLSP was not as successful as the JVP, they still participated in elections. FLSP failed to overcome the JVP's popularity.

Premakumar Gunaratnam was an elusive leader, yet the JVP leadership denied his existence. In April 2012, the internal crisis within the party heated up between the hard-core socialist Gunaratnam and the party leader Somawansa Amarasinghe. As a result, the party's media unit was shut down once a majority of the members extended their support to Gunaratnam. The women's wing and a majority of the students and youth wings have extended their support to the Gunaratnam group.

Several student union leaders like Duminda Nagamuwa, Udul Premaratne, and Chameera Koswatta sided with the FLSP.

=== Anura Kumara Dissanayake's leadership (2014–present) ===
Anura Kumara Dissanayake took over leadership of the JVP in February 2014, following the retirement of Somawansa Amarasinghe, who had guided the party through its post-insurrection democratic transition. Dissanayake’s rise marked a clear generational shift. Young, articulate, and uncompromising in his critiques of systemic corruption and elitist politics, he quickly became a formidable force in Parliament and beyond. From the outset, his mission was clear: to modernize the JVP, broaden its appeal, and transform it into a credible governing alternative.

Anti-Corruption Crusader

As a parliamentarian, Dissanayake earned a reputation for sharp criticism, especially on corruption and misuse of public resources. His leadership of COPE (Committee on Public Enterprises) brought to light numerous financial irregularities in government institutions, reinforcing his image as a principled watchdog. Unlike many in the political mainstream, Dissanayake positioned the JVP and later the NPP (National People's Power) as a clean and disciplined political force, untainted by dynastic politics or crony capitalism.

==== Birth of the NPP: A Coalition for the Future ====
In 2019, under Dissanayake’s vision, the Jathika Jana Balawegaya (NPP) was formed—a broad coalition led by the JVP that brought together progressive trade unions, intellectuals, professionals, and civil society groups. The NPP allowed the JVP to break out of its traditional base and appeal to a wider audience disillusioned with the two-party status quo. The 2020 parliamentary election saw the NPP win 3 seats, a modest but symbolically important achievement. It positioned Anura Kumara as a future presidential contender and signaled the start of a long-term political strategy to build a third force in Sri Lankan politics.

==== Post-Aragalaya Momentum and 2024 Campaigning ====
Following the 2022 "Aragalaya" protest movement, which led to the resignation of President Gotabaya Rajapaksa, the political tide began to shift more favorably toward outsiders. Anura Kumara and the NPP capitalized on this momentum, emerging as a leading voice calling for structural reforms and people-centric governance. By 2024, the NPP was gaining traction nationwide, particularly among urban youth, professionals, and first-time voters. Dissanayake’s speeches delivered in plain, relatable language resonated with a generation disillusioned by decades of failed promises.

==== 2015 presidential and parliamentary elections ====
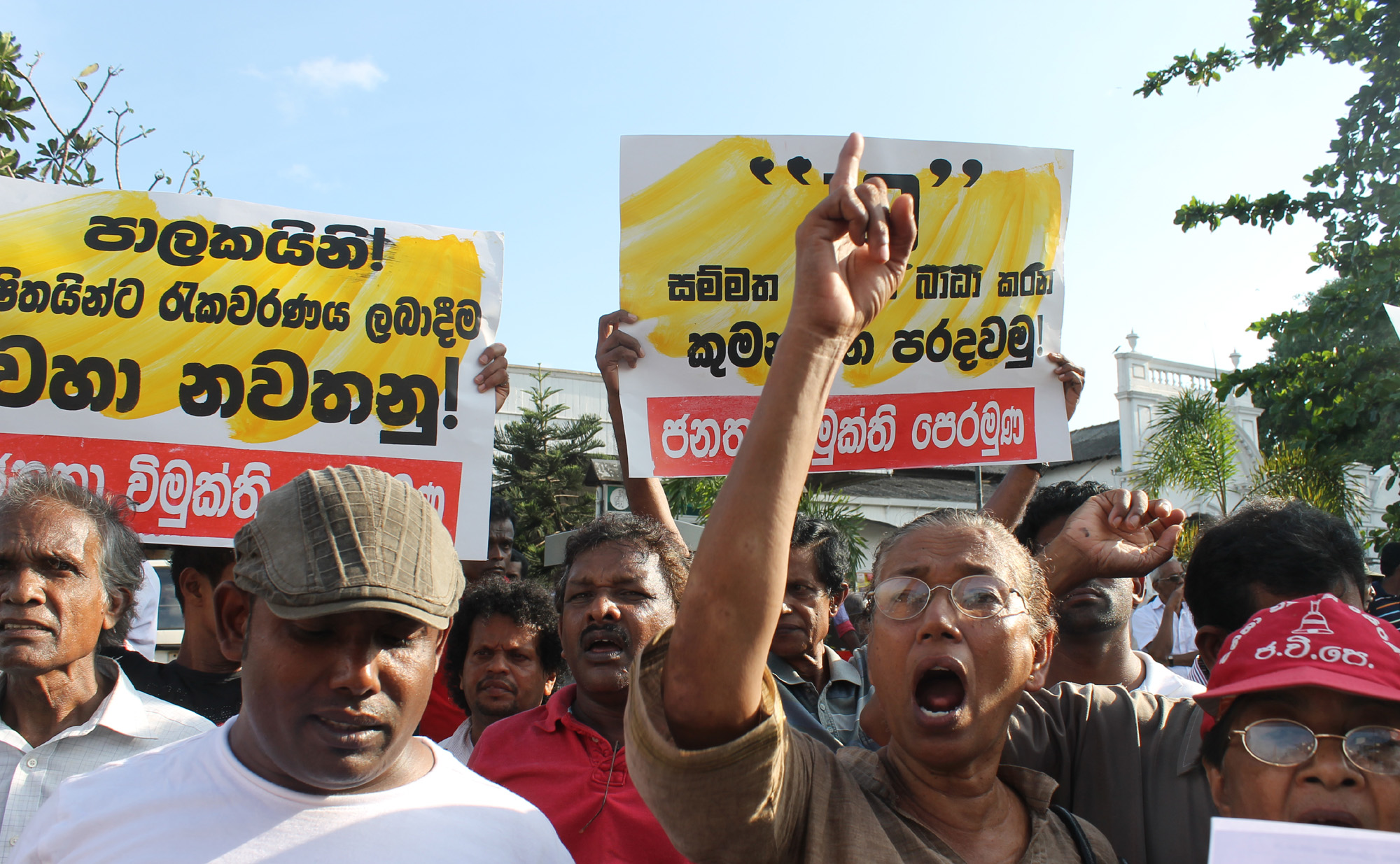
A pro-democracy protest by the JVP

JVP neither contested nor directly supported any coalition in the January 2015 presidential election, but it heavily criticised incumbent President Mahinda Rajapaksa, which assisted in his defeat. Later in August the party participated in the parliamentary election and obtained six seats, receiving 543,944 votes.

==== 2019 presidential elections ====
In preparation for the 2019 election, Anura Kumara Dissanayake (AKD) founded the National People's Power (NPP), a broad left-wing political alliance, meant to broaden JVP's appeal. The party contested in the elections as the NPP, the newly formed JVP coalition, and its candidate was AKD. He received 418,553 votes, which accounted for 3.16% of valid votes in the presidential election. Since then, the party has been called the NPP or JJB (Jathika Jana Balavegaya), but is still referred to as JVP casually.

==== 2020 parliamentary elections ====
The NPP participated in the 2020 elections, and became 4th largest party in parliament. The party gained a total of 445,958 (3.48%) votes, the worst result for the party since its second election in 1994.

=== In government (2024–present) ===
==== 2024 presidential election ====
Anura Kumara Dissanayake ran for a second time under the banner of the NPP. The election was a three-way contest between incumbent President Ranil Wickremesinghe, incumbent Leader of the Opposition Sajith Premadasa and Dissanayake. The first vote count concluded with no candidate winning a majority. Dissanayake won a plurality of the vote with 42.31%, followed by Premadasa with 32.76%. Incumbent president Wickremesinghe finished third, winning only 17.27% of the vote. Since no candidate won a majority, a second round of vote counting was held for the first time in Sri Lanka's history under its limited ranked voting system. The following day, Dissanayake was declared the winner, winning 55.89% of the vote in the second round. He took office the following day. Anura Kumara Dissanayake would lead a minority government with the only 3 NPP MP's in parliament until the subsequent parliamentary elections.

==== 2024 parliamentary elections ====
In the subsequent parliamentary elections, the JVP became the largest party in the parliament for the first time with 159 seats, winning a supermajority. The JVP majority was the second-largest majority in the country's parliamentary history, and the first election since 1977 where a single party managed to achieve a supermajority. The JVP secured 6,863,186 votes, the highest ever obtained by a single political party in a general election, surpassing the 6,853,690 votes won by the SLPFA in 2020. The JVP also won a record breaking 61.56% of the total vote, overtaking the previous record of 60.33% won by the UPFA in 2010. The JVP won the most seats in the Jaffna District, thus making it the first non-Tamil political party to win this district. Altogether, the JVP won 21 out of 22 electoral districts, and 152 constituencies.

Vijitha Hearath, contesting from Gampaha District, won 716,715 preferential votes, the highest ever recorded by a candidate in Sri Lanka. This surpassed previous records set by Ranil Wickremesinghe in 2015 (500,566 votes), Mahinda Rajapaksa in 2020 (527,364 votes), and Harini Amarasuriya earlier in the election with 655,289 votes from the Colombo District. The election also witnessed a milestone in women's representation, with a record 21 female MPs elected, the highest in Sri Lanka's parliamentary history. Among them, 19 represented the JVP.

After the electoral successes of JVP followed a public reexamination of its history and modern ideology. The Economist claimed that the party had been distancing itself from Marxism for years, "disavowing class struggle" and embracing market economy. The Trotskyist journal In Defence of Marxism called JVP a "middle-ground party", stressing their Sindhala-Buddhist chauvinism and past support for the Tamil genocide. The article continues to highlight how Dissanayake has shifted blame from "capitalism" to "corruption" in his campaign and programme. Others have pointed out how the NPP is stuck between the need for austerity to meet conditions set by the IMF with promises of funding and expanding social services.

== Military organization ==
The JVP military section, which was made up of mostly inadequately trained youths, were responsible for attacks on several locations throughout Sri Lanka, including on the Jaffna prison, SLAF Ekala and the Wellawaya town in 1971. Later in the 80s, the JVP with the assistance of several other militant organisations (many of whom split of from the JVP during the 1987 insurgency) trained the Patriotic People's Armed Forces. The Patriotic People's Armed Forces would carry out more organized attacks such as the attack on the Pallekele detachment. The military section of the JVP in the late 80s were led by the DJV leader Keerthi Vijayabahu.

=== 1971 ===
Despite the lack of training they received, the JVP militants were armed with shotguns, wore blue colored uniforms with boots and helmets, carried hatchets, and ammunition.Weapons mostly consisted of captured SLA or SLP arms, hunting rifles and handmade guns. The primary source of funding were bank robberies.

=== 1987–1989 ===
During its second insurgency, they were armed with stolen weapons such as AK 47, T 56, and .303 British rifles though militants involved in assassinations would heavily rely on smaller pistols and handmade guns.

== International relationships ==
The JVP was internationally affiliated to multiple organisations, some of which include the Palestine Liberation Organization (PLO), the National Liberation Front of Yemen, and the Korean Workers' Party (KWP).

=== North Korea ===
In the early 1970s, North Korea backed the JVP by supplying training. As a result, diplomatic connections between Sri Lanka and North Korea were cut off and were not re-established. 18 North Koreans were expelled from the island, but it did not stop their support of the JVP, and Indian patrol boats deployed around the island were attacked by North Korean gunboats that raided the territory. Prior to expulsion, the North Koreans spent 14,000 dollars supporting the movement with propaganda. They also supplied militant equipment and instructions on making explosives and conducting guerrilla warfare.

In 2017, the Sri Lankan government imposed UN sanctions on North Korea. The leader of the JVP & NPP, Anura Kumara Dissanayake, criticised the procedure, claiming North Korea is socialist and that Sri Lanka should support it.

==== Maintaining relations with North Korea ====
In 1970 a North Korean trade office in Colombo became an embassy and started its work the same year. While in Sri Lanka, North Korean diplomats cultivated links to the JVP, and the nation helped the group directly through the office. Wijeweera visited North Korea prior to the establishment of the JVP.

=== Iraq ===
The JVP sectors before the 1970s were limited to the Arab Socialist Ba'ath Party of Iraq (ASBPI). Wijeweera and Shantha Bandara visited Iraq multiple times in order to meet the members of the ASBPI. Bandara successfully formed the Inter-University Students' Federation to work as a liaison point between the two parties. When the Iran–Iraq War began, a few members of the JVP protested in front of the Iranian embassy. During the second JVP insurgency, the JVP received money from Iraq to fund the Patriotic People's Movement.

=== Soviet Union ===
The Soviet Union began to recognise the JVP in 1978 when it was no longer affiliated to the Chinese Communist Party (CCP). The Soviet Communist Party invited the organisation along with the CPSL to participate in the International Federation of Youths and Students. All financing was provided by the Soviet Union for the parties that visited the meeting upon Soviet invitation.

== Ideology ==
The JVP's ideology has occasionally changed depending on its leadership or other national and political issues within Sri Lanka or any other influential group. The JVP's initial mixed ideology was shaped by its origin from Maoism and exposure to other forms of Marxism, such as drawing on Maoist emphasis on the rural peasantry, Guevarist views on armed insurrection, and some Trotskyist criticisms of Stalinism while maintaining an anti-revisionist line. In the beginning, it had schisms from internal ideological conflicts.

=== First five lectures (1965–1983) ===
The first five lectures of the JVP based on class and social struggle were about the "failures" of the old left and the "path" for a new left. Wijeweera, who held anti-Indian sentiments, gave lectures against Indian irredentism. The rest of the lectures are based on economy and unemployment.

=== Jathika Chintanaya (1983–1989) ===
In 1983, the JVP's ideology was modified, as the party foresaw the consequence of inaction against Indian intelligence agencies (particularly the Research and Analysis Wing) infiltrating the national patronage. By this time it developed its own ideology named Jathika Chintanaya (transl. "national ideology").The new ideology marked a shift in the JVP's ideology from Marxism–Leninism towards Sinhalese Buddhist Nationalism. This was seen in the party's opposition towards Sri Lankan Tamil demands during the brewing civil war.

=== Third lecture (1994–present) ===
Somawansa Amarasinghe, who subsequently became the leader, modified the JVP from the roots by abandoning Sinhalese Buddhist Nationalism for a pragmatic socialist line, while officially remaining a Marxist-Leninist party. The party also reconciled with other democratic groups but refused to be affiliated nationally, but later joined some left-right alliances such as the United National Front. The organisation believes in democracy-based political lines rather than insurrectionist lines it appreciated since its conception.

== Leadership ==
=== Leader ===
| Name | Portrait | Periods in party leadership | Special Notes |
|---|---|---|---|
| Rohana Wijeweera | | 14 May 1965 – 13 November 1989 | Founder of the JVP, led the party from its beginning until his death on 13 November 1989. |
| Saman Piyasiri Fernando | | 13 November 1989 – 29 December 1989 | Led the JVP for a few days until his death. |
| Lalith Wijerathna | | 27 December 1989 – 1 January 1990 | Third leader of the JVP for a very brief period until his capture and arrest. |
| Somawansa Amarasinghe | | 1 January 1990 – 2 February 2014 | Rebuilt the JVP after almost all its top leaders were eliminated between 1989 and 1990. Continued to be its leader until his retirement in February 2014. |
| Anura Kumara Dissanayake | | 2 February 2014 – present | Current leader of the JVP and President of Sri Lanka since 2024. |

=== General Secretary ===
| Name | Portrait | Periods in party leadership |
|---|---|---|
| Athula Nimalasiri Jayasinghe | | 14 May 1965 – 1973 |
| Upatissa Gamanayake | | 1973 – 25 December 1976 |
| Lionel Bopage | | 1971 – 1983 |
| Somawansa Amarasinghe | | 25 December 1983 – 1 January 1990 |
| Tilvin Silva | | 1 January 1990 – 1994 |
| Nandana Gunathilake | | 1994-14 July 1995 |
| Tilvin Silva | | 15 July 1995 – present |

=== Other notable leaders ===
- Sarath Wijesinghe
- Victor Ivan
- Jayadeva Uyangoda
- Upatissa Gamanayake
- D.M. Ananda
- H.B. Herath
- Shantha Bandara
- Premakumar Gunaratnam
- P. R. B. Wimalarathna
- Piyadasa Ranasinghe
- Nandathilaka Galappaththi
- Gunaratne Wanasinghe

== Electoral history ==
=== Presidential ===
Sri Lanka presidential elections
| Election year | Candidate | First round | | Second round | | Result |
| Election year | Candidate | Votes | Vote % | Votes | Vote % | Result |
|---|---|---|---|---|---|---|
| 1982 | Rohana Wijeweera | 273,428 | 4.19% | —N/a | | Lost |
| 1994 | Nihal Galappaththi | 22,749 | 0.30% | —N/a | | Lost (Note: Contested as a Sri Lanka Progressive Front candidate) |
| 1999 | Nandana Gunathilake | 344,173 | 4.08% | —N/a | | Lost |
| 2019 | Anura Kumara Dissanayake | 418,553 | 3.16% | —N/a | | Lost (Note: Contested as a National People's Power candidate) |
| 2024 | Anura Kumara Dissanayake | 5,634,915 | 42.31% | 5,716,971 | 55.96% | Won |

=== Parliamentary ===
| Election year | Party leader | Votes | Vote % | Seats won | +/– | Government |
|---|---|---|---|---|---|---|
| 1994 | Somawansa Amarasinghe | 90,078 | 1.13% | 1 / 225 | ▲1 | Opposition |
| 2000 | Somawansa Amarasinghe | 518,774 | 6.00% | 10 / 225 | ▲9 | Opposition |
| 2001 | Somawansa Amarasinghe | 815,353 | 9.10% | 16 / 225 | ▲6 | Opposition |
| 2004 | Somawansa Amarasinghe | 4,223,970 | 45.60% | 39 / 225 | ▲23 | Government (2004–2005) (Note: As part of the United People's Freedom Alliance, but left the coalition after a year with the 39 elected seats) |
| 2004 | Somawansa Amarasinghe | 4,223,970 | 45.60% | 39 / 225 | ▲23 | Opposition (2005–2010) |
| 2010 | Somawansa Amarasinghe | 441,251 | 5.49% | 4 / 225 | ▼35 | Opposition (Note: As part of the Democratic National Alliance, but later the coalition was dissolved and JVP was left with 4 seats) |
| 2015 | Anura Kumara Dissanayake | 543,944 | 4.87% | 6 / 225 | ▲2 | Opposition |
| 2020 | Anura Kumara Dissanayake | 445,958 | 3.84% | 3 / 225 | ▼3 | Opposition |
| 2024 | Anura Kumara Dissanayake | 6,863,186 | 61.56% | 159 / 225 | ▲156 | Government (Note: Contested as the National People's Power.) |

=== Provincial ===
| Election year | Votes | Vote % | Councillors | Councils | +/– | Leader |
|---|---|---|---|---|---|---|
| 1999 | 417,168 | 6.24% | 25 / 380 | 0 / 2 | | Somawansa Amarasinghe |
| 2004 | 3,364,239 | 57.68% | 227 / 380 | 7 / 7 | ▲202 | Somawansa Amarasinghe |
| 2008 | 234,442 | 2.88% | 12 / 417 | 0 / 8 | ▼215 | Somawansa Amarasinghe |
| 2012 | 31,384 | 1.56% | 1 / 114 | 0 / 3 | ▼11 | Somawansa Amarasinghe |
| 2013 | 33,799 | 1.25% | 1 / 148 | 0 / 3 | 0 | Somawansa Amarasinghe |
| 2014 (Mar) | 265,240 | 7.05% | 11 / 159 | 0 / 2 | ▲10 | Anura Kumara Dissanayake |
| 2014 (Sep) | 36,580 | 5.36% | 2 / 34 | 0 / 1 | ▲1 | Anura Kumara Dissanayake |

=== Local ===
| Election year | Votes | Vote % | Councillors | Local Authorities | +/– | Leader |
|---|---|---|---|---|---|---|
| 2002 | 492,429 | 6.83% | 257 / 3,629 | 1 / 296 | | Somawansa Amarasinghe |
| 2006 | 859,748 | 12.73% | 377 / 4,013 | 1 / 296 | ▲120 | Somawansa Amarasinghe |
| 2011 | 242,502 | 2.84% | 74 / 4,327 | 0 / 322 | ▼303 | Somawansa Amarasinghe |
| 2018 | 710,932 | 5.75% | 434 / 8,327 | 0 / 340 | ▲360 | Anura Kumara Dissanayake |
| 2019 (Elpitiya) | 2,435 | 5.80% | 2 / 30 | 0 / 1 | ▲2 | Anura Kumara Dissanayake |
| 2024 (Elpitiya) | 17,295 | 47.64% | 15 / 30 | 1 / 1 | ▲13 | Anura Kumara Dissanayake |
| 2025 | 4,503,930 | 43.26% | 3,927 / 7,812 | 265 / 341 | ▲3,493 | Anura Kumara Dissanayake |

== Offshoots ==
Since its creation in 1965, JVP has had several major schisms: some branches emerged as militant factions while others participated in elections. Many schisms were due to ideological changes, while others were caused by internal conflicts with other major leaders within the party.

- The Viplavakari Tharuna Peramuna (Ceylon Revolutionary Youth Front) participated with the JVP and the Lanka Sama Samaja Party in a rally on May Day; it is believed to be an offshoot.
- The Motherland Defense Front was a patriotic front that was formerly a coalition between the JVP and the Maoists. It was succeeded by the Patriotic People's Movement.
- The Maoist Youth Front was created in 1970 as a Maoist offshoot of the JVP when a certain number of JVP members were expelled from the group. It emerged as a militant organization before collapsing after the first JVP insurrection in 1971. Its leader was Dharmasekara.
- The Frontline Socialist Party was formed in 2012.
- The Jathika Nidahas Peramuna or National Freedom Front (NFF) is a left-wing offshoot of non-radicals formerly part of the JVP led by former JVP member Wimal Weerawansa, it remains closely aligned to the SLFP.

== See also ==
- List of assassinations of the Second JVP Insurrection
- Udugan Yamaya
- Ginnen Upan Seethala
