= Frontline Socialist Party =

Leftist political party in Sri Lanka

Frontline Socialist Party පෙරටුගාමී සමාජවාදී පක්ෂය முன்னிலை சோஷலிஸக் கட்சி
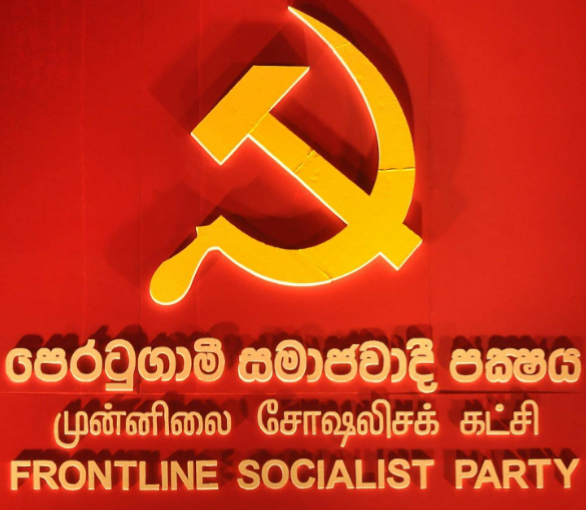
- Abbreviation: FSP
- Secretary-General: Premakumar Gunaratnam
- Founded: 9 April 2012
- Split from: Janatha Vimukthi Peramuna
- Headquarters: No 24 Melder Pl, Nugegoda, Sri Lanka
- Newspaper: වම ("Vama". Meaning "Left"
- Student wing: Revolutionary Student Union
- Youth wing: Youth For CHEnge
- Women's wing: Free Women
- Ideology: Communism; Marxism-Leninism; Anti-imperialism; Revolutionary socialism
- Political position: Far-left
- National affiliation: People's Struggle Alliance
- Colors: Red; Yellow

Election symbol
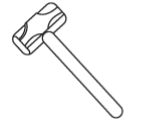
- Sledgehammer

Website
- www.frontlinesp.org

The Frontline Socialist Party (abbrv. FSP; Sinhala: පෙරටුගාමී සමාජවාදී පක්ෂය, romanized: Peraṭugāmī Samājavādī Pakṣaya; Tamil: முன்னிலை சோஷலிஸக் கட்சி, romanized: Muṉṉilai Coṣalicak Kaṭci) is a Marxist-Leninist party in Sri Lanka. It was launched on 9 April 2012 by dissident members of the Janatha Vimukthi Peramuna.

Stalwarts of the party claim that they are part of an attempt to revive the socialist struggle in Sri Lanka. The secretary-general of the party is Premakumar Gunaratnam.

== History ==
The FSP claims that the Janatha Vimukthi Peramuna had lost its revolutionary thought built by Rohana Wijeweera since the beginning of his campaign. They claim that the JVP now relies on government coalitions rather than revolutionary socialism.

Premakumar Gunaratnam was the leader of the Deshapremi Janatha Viyaparaya in Trincomalee and worked as a secondary revolutionary leader of the JVP. He was at the odds of the party for the lack of revolutionary purpose after Wijeweera's death in 1989.

In April 2012, internal crisis within the party heated up between hardline socialist Gunaratnam and the party leader Somawansa Amarasinghe. As a result, the party’s media unit was shut down once a majority of the members extended their support to Gunarathnam. The women’s wing and a majority of the students' wing and the youth wing extended their support to Gunaratnam.

=== 2020 protests ===
In 2020, members of the party along with some other left-wing parties held protests in front of the US embassy in Sri Lanka, but were later assaulted by police officers on the grounds that they were committing violations of COVID-19 "health regulations".

Party members claimed the protest was a peaceful protest against the murder of George Floyd and against the signing of the MCC deal with the United States.

Members of the FSP, Premakumar Gunaratnam and a group of FSP supporters led a street march, with most protesters wearing the color red to symbolize communism and anti-racism. The members carried posters that read "Racism is a deadly virus", in reference to the COVID-19 outbreak. Police soon blocked the road to the U.S Embassy, and began to clash with the protesters. No deaths were caused in the combat but many were wounded.

FSP secretary Kumar Guneratnam and other key members of the FSP were arrested and some others were hospitalized after the attack. Two lawyers who questioned the police about the reason for arrest also were taken into the custody.

== Electoral history ==
Sri Lanka Presidential Elections
Election year	Candidate	Votes	Vote %	Result
2015	Duminda Nagamuwa	9,941	0.08%	Lost
2019	Duminda Nagamuwa	8,219	0.06%	Lost
2024	Nuwan Bopage	11,191	0.08%	Lost

Sri Lanka Parliamentary Elections
Election year	Votes	Vote %	Seats won	+/–	Government
2015	7,349	0.07%	0 / 225	Steady	Extra parliamentary
2020	14,522	0.13%	0 / 225	Steady	Extra parliamentary
2024	29,611	0.27%	0 / 225	Steady	Extra parliamentary
