= Attack on the Pallekele detachment =

Preparation for insurrection

- Part of the 1987-1989 JVP insurrection
- Location: Pallekele, Sri Lanka
- Planned by: Deshapremi Janatha Viyaparaya
- Commanded by: Saman Piyasiri Fernando (Keerthi Vijayabahu)
- Target: 2nd Armed Corps, Sinha Regiment
- Date: 14 (prep), 15 April, 1987
- Executed by: Patriotic People's Armed Forces
- Outcome: Deshapremi Janatha Viyaparaya victory Base sealed off for few weeks

The attack on the Sri Lankan Armed Forces (SLAF) base in Pallekele was an attack carried out by the Patriotic People's Armed Troops together with the Patriotic People's Movement, which were armed divisions of the Janatha Vimukthi Peramuna (JVP; People's Liberation Front). The attack was led by Keerthi Vijayabahu, as a preparation for the 1987-1989 JVP insurrection.

== Background ==
The Sri Lankan Civil War began in 1983 following years of racial and political tensions between the Majority Sinhalese and the Minority Tamil people in Sri Lanka. The Indian Peacekeeping Force arrived in 1987 following the Indo-Lanka accord. The JVP opposed the arrival of the IPKF and revolted against the pro-Western J. R. Jayawardene led government. They named the UNP government as traitors and created the "Patriotic People's Movement" (DJV) which carried out the attack. Piyasiri later would operate as the leader of the JVP.

== Attack ==
=== Account of a member ===
According to Kosala a.k.a. Adhikari, the JVP members received training in rural areas. They were trained for a period of time like 1-2 weeks. He got basic training like usage of a knife and assault rifle as preparation for the attack.

=== The Attack ===
On 15 April 1987, the JVP launched the attack on the SLAF detachment in Pallekele in Kandy. Assisted by a SLAF deserter, Mahinda, under the directions of Shantha Bandara and Gemunu (Premakumar Gunaratnam), the JVP seized 12 Type 56 assault rifles, seven sub-machine guns and ammunition. The attack was carried out by a paramilitary of the JVP, Patriotic People's Armed Troops. The cadre wore army uniforms (camouflage) and used hand grenades.

== Investigation and aftermath ==
JVP used the weapons they took away, months later on 7 June, Sri Lanka Air Force Base, SLAF Katunayake and the Kotelawala Defence Academy were attacked and weapons and ammunition were stolen while only four of the attackers were killed in the entire series of attacks. DJV claimed responsibility and the Criminal Investigation Department investigation resulted in 13 JVP members arrested. Kosala stated that these weren't against the Sri Lankan army but attempts made to collect weapons and arm themselves for the conflict.
