= Nandana Gunathilake =

Sri Lankan politician (1962–2026)

Hon. Nandana Gunathilake MP
- නන්දන ගුණතිලක

Chairman of the Panadura Urban Council
- In office April 2018 – 19 March 2023

Member of Parliament for Kalutara District
- In office 2000–2010

Personal details
- Born: Masteaga Don Nandana Gunathilake; 7 September 1962 Panadura, Kalutara District, Dominion of Ceylon
- Died: 18 January 2026 (aged 63) Colombo, Sri Lanka
- Party: United National Party (after 2015); New Democratic Front (after 2024)
- Other political affiliations: Janatha Vimukthi Peramuna (1984–2004); United People's Freedom Alliance (2004–2015); Sri Lanka Freedom Party (2010–2015)
- Education: Sri Sumangala College, Panadura
- Alma mater: University of Peradeniya (dropped out)
- Occupation: Politician

Masteaga Don Nandana Gunathilake (7 September 1962 – 18 January 2026) was a Sri Lankan politician and member of the Parliament of Sri Lanka. He was the candidate of the Janatha Vimukthi Peramuna at the 1999 Sri Lankan presidential election, placing 3rd in the election.

== Personal life ==
Nandana Gunathilake was born on 7 September 1962 in Panadura, Kalutara District in a family with four siblings. His father was a teacher and his mother a housewife. He completed education at Sri Sumangala College in Panadura and was selected for the Faculty of Agriculture at the University of Peradeniya.

== Political career ==
While studying at the University of Peradeniya, Gunathilake entered politics as a frontline activist in student politics. He first entered the United National Party (UNP) as a member of its Samavadi Students' Union from 1976 to 1983. Then in 1984, he joined the Janatha Vimukthi Peramuna (JVP) while still a university student. He continued to dominate the university in several leftist rebel groups and dropped out of the university to pursue politics full-time. He was a key organizer of the JVP during the 1987–1989 JVP insurrection.

Gunathilake continued to work for JVP until 2004, where he was a member of the Politburo and helped rebuild the JVP after the second insurrection. JVP leader Somawansa Amarasinghe appointed Gunathilake as general secretary of the party in 1994 after Tilvin Silva was sent to prison. He was the candidate of the JVP in the 1999 presidential elections, in which Gunathilake stated he ran as "the common candidate of the left". Gunathilake received 344,173 votes, becoming the third-most voted candidate at the election.

Gunathilake left the JVP in 2004, citing the party's policy changes, and subsequently joined the United People's Freedom Alliance (UPFA) and became the first chairman of the alliance. He contested the 2004 parliamentary elections and was successfully elected to parliament. After leaving the JVP, he formed the Jathika Nidahas Peramuna (NFF) along with Wimal Weerawansa in 2008. Gunathilake then served as Acting Minister of Posts and Telecommunications from 2009 to 2010 as well as Acting Minister of Tourism in 2009. After several disputes, he joined the Sri Lanka Freedom Party (SLFP) in 2010, and was later appointed as the Kalutara District Organizer of the SLFP in 2010. In 2011, he became the Chairman of the Panadura Urban Council for the first time.

Gunathilake later defected to the United National Party in 2015 and supported presidential candidate Maithripala Sirisena in the 2015 Sri Lankan presidential election. During this period, Gunathilake worked as the mayor of the Panadura Urban Council from April 2018 to 19 March 2023 twice from the United People's Freedom Alliance and the United National Party. After his resignation, he joined the New Democratic Front in 2024 and remained a member of the alliance until his death. In December 2025, he was summoned to the Commission to Investigate Allegations of Bribery or Corruption (CIABOC).

== Illness and death ==
Gunathilake continually suffered from multiple organ failure throughout late 2025 and received medications frequently. He posted a note on his official Facebook page about his illness while in the hospital.

Gunathilake died on 18 January 2026 at the age of 63 while receiving treatment at Ragama Hospital. His remains were kept at the Panadura Urban Council from 10:00 a.m. to 2:00 p.m. on 19 January 2026 for public respects. The body was then placed at the Young Men's Buddhist Association Hall from 5:00 p.m. until 21 January. His funeral was held at 4:00 p.m. at the Wadduwa Public Playground on 21 January 2026.
