= Jayadeva Uyangoda =

Sri Lankan political scientist (born 1950)

- Born: 13 September 1950 (age 75); Matara, Sri Lanka
- Other names: U-mahathaya
- Education: PhD
- Occupation: University professor

Jayadeva Uyangoda (born 13 September 1950) is a Sri Lankan political scientist. He is a constitutional expert in Sri Lanka.

Jayadewa Uyangoda was a leftist student leader and a member of the Janatha Vimukthi Peramuna (JVP) movement in the 1970s. He was arrested following the aborted insurrection of 1971 and was imprisoned by the courts. Later, he was released with other JVP rebels on an unconditional pardon by the newly appointed Jayawardena Regime in late 1970s. Having released from the jail, he did his doctoral research in the University of Hawaii on Nationalism and State Formation in Bangladesh. He remains one of Sri Lanka's most veteran commentators on ethnic conflict and human rights. He worked with Neelan Tiruchelvam in drafting the model constitution in 1999.

As of May 2012, Uyangoda is a professor in the Department of Political Science and Public Policy at the University of Colombo, and founder-director of the Centre for Policy Research and Analysis, Colombo. He is a former chairman of the Sri Lanka Foundation in Colombo.

Uyangoda was the founder editor and later co-editor of Pravada, an academic journal in English that focuses on Sri Lanka and South Asia. He continues to write prolifically in Sinhala and English.
