= Serious Business Records =

American independent record label

- Founded: 2004
- Founder: Travis Harrison; Andy Ross
- Genre: Rock; punk; pop punk; country
- Country of origin: United States
- Location: New York City
- Official website: seriousbusinessrecords.com (archived)

Serious Business Records is an independent record label founded by Travis Harrison and Andy Ross in Brooklyn, New York in 2004. Since its inception, Serious Business Records has a diverse range of artists, spanning the genres of classic rock, punk, pop, Americana/Old-Time, and electronic music.

As of 2025, Serious Business Records is still being ran by Harrison, however at a much lesser scale than it had been running 10 years prior.

== History ==
From 2002 until late 2003, Travis Harrison and Andy Ross operated a recording studio named The Shack in a one-room shack on the side of the road in Sayville, Long Island near Harrison's hometown. At the same time, they were in the band Unsacred Hearts and Ross in particular was working on his solo project Secret Dakota Ring (then named The A-Ross Experience). In April 2003, the studio moved into another tiny one room shack, in Long Island City, Queens. In January 2004, it relocated again to a 1,300-square-foot (120 m^{2}) loft space at 538 Johnson Ave in East Williamsburg/Bushwick, Brooklyn, where the studio was renamed and Serious Business Records was officially established. It's roster initially consisted of Unsacred Hearts, The Two Man Gentlemen Band, Secret Dakota Ring, and DraculaZombieUSA.

In late 2004, Ross moved from New York to California, but still remained somewhat active in Serious Business Records.

In January 2007, Serious Business relocated to 73 Spring Street in SoHo, and remained there until 2014. Serious Business currently resides in Dumbo, Brooklyn, New York.

== Artists ==
- Unsacred Hearts
- The Two Man Gentlemen Band
- Secret Dakota Ring
- DraculaZombieUSA
- Man in Gray
- The Octagon
- Kickstart
- Benji Cossa
- Looker
- Rocketship Park
- Higgins
- Jack and the Pulpits
- The Homosexuals
- The Paparazzi
- Saadi
- Lifeguards (Note: All of Lifeguards's releases were joint released with Ernest Jenning.)
- Ghosts of Travel and Leisure (Cold Memory (Note: While Cold Memory was originally signed to Revup Records, and their only album, Damage/No Damage, was initially released under that label, all streaming releases are attributed to Serious Business Records.))
- Rat Room

== Releases ==
- Cold Memory - Damage / No Damage (2002)
- Unsacred Hearts - Unsacred Hearts (SBR01) (2004)
- Secret Dakota Ring - Do Not Leave Baggage All The Way (SBR02) (2004)
- Unsacred Hearts/Man in Gray - Man In Gray/Unsacred Hearts Split 7" (SBR03) (2005)
- Man in Gray - No Day / No Night (SBR04) (2003)
- The Two Man Gentlemen Band - The Two Man Gentlemen Band (SBR05) (2005)
- DraculaZombieUSA - DraculaZombieUSA (SBR06) (2005)
- Unsacred Hearts - In Defense of Fort Useless (SBR07) (2006)
- The Two Man Gentlemen Band - Great Calamities (SBR08) (2006)
- Unsacred Hearts - Five Believers (SBR09) (2006)
- The Octagon - 'Love Will Turn You Around' b/w 'Birdman' 7-inch (SBR10) (2006)
- Man in Gray - I Can't Sleep Unless I Hear You Breathing (SBR11) (2007)
- Kickstart - Kickstart (SBR12) (2007)
- Benji Cossa - Between the Blue and the Green (SBR13) (2007)
- The Octagon - Nothing But Change (SBR14) (2007)
- Looker - 'After My Divorce' / 'Master's Gone Away' 7-inch (SBR15) (2007)
- Rocketship Park - Off and Away (SBR16) (2007)
- DraculaZombieUSA - 'Right Makes Might' / 'Long Shot' (SBR17) (2007)
- The Two Man Gentlemen Band - Heavy Petting (SBR18) (2007)
- Benji Cossa - Merry Christmas to Friends and Family. Love, Benji Cossa (SBR19) (2007)
- The Year In Business: 2007 (SBR20) (2007) (Note: End-of-year compilation records for the label.)
- Higgins - 'Yes I Know' / 'Slap Or Pinch' (SBR21) (2008)
- Looker - 'Gates of the Old City' / 'Help Me Roada' (SBR22) (2008)
- Benji Cossa - Benji Cossa's Vault Vol. 2: Jewels and Gems (SBR23) (2008)
- Jack and the Pulpits - Jack and the Pupits (SBR24) (2008)
- Looker - 'Spit for Your Shine' / 'Born in the Desert' (SBR25) (2008)
- Secret Dakota Ring - Cantarell (SBR26) (2008)
- Higgins - Zs (SBR27) (2008)
- Benji Cossa - Benji Cossa and the Tightens (SBR28) (2008)
- Benji Cossa - The Rollercossa (SBR29) (2008)
- Looker - Born in the Desert (SBR30) (2008)
- Higgins/Andy From Denver (SBR31) (2008)
- Higgins - Trust In Higgins vol. 1 (SBR32) (2008)
- The Homosexuals - Love Guns? (SBR33) (2008)
- The Year In Business: 2008 (SBR34) (2008)
- The Two Man Gentlemen Band - Drip Dryin' with the Two Man Gentlemen Band (SBR35) (2009)
- The Octagon - Arm Brain Heart and Liver (SBR37) (2009)
- Jack and the Pulpits - Francypants (SBR38) (2009)
- The Two Man Gentlemen Band - Live In New York! (SBR39) (2010)
- The Paparazzi - Rococo (SBR40) (2010)
- The Octagon - Warm Love And Cool Dreams Forever (SBR41) (2010)
- Saadi - Bad City 12" (SBR42) (2010)
- The Year In Business: 2009 (SBR43) (2009)
- Lifeguards - Product Head (SBR44) (2010)
- The Two Man Gentlemen Band - ¡Dos Amigos, Una Fiesta! (SBR45) (2010)
- Lifeguards - Waving At The Astronauts (SBR46) (2010)
- Rocketship Park - Cakes and Cookies (SBR48) (2011)
- Benji Cossa - Favorites 01: Sebastian Blanck (SBR49) (2011)
- Unsacred Hearts - Honor Bar (SBR50) (2011)
- Higgins - Slap or Pinch / I Wonder What Dudes Are Doing (SBR52) (2011)
- Benji Cossa - Favorites 02: Eric Copeland (SBR53) (2011)
- Benji Cossa - Favorites 03: Daniel Strange (SBR55) (2011)
- Higgins - Straight A's (SBR56) (2013)
- Benji Cossa - Favorites 04: Val Britton (SBR57) (2012)
- Benji Cossa - Favorites 05: Ben Heller (SBR58) (2012)
- Benji Cossa - II (2016)
- Benji Cossa - What Friends? (2016)
- Benji Cossa - Incidentally, Benji Cossa (2019)
- Benji Cossa - Real Fantasy (2019)
- Unsacred Hearts - City to Sea (2019)
- Benji Cossa - Demo Derby (2020)
- Ghosts of Travel and Leisure - Ghosts of Travel and Leisure (2023)
- Benji Cossa - Song Service (2023)
- Rat Room - Rat Room (2025)

== Founders ==
=== Travis Harrison ===
As a drummer, Travis Harrison has performed with The Homosexuals, The Unsacred Hearts, Double Dong, Secret Dakota Ring, DraculaZombieUSA, TaxiTaxi, Benji Cossa and the Two Man Gentlemen Band as well as participating in the Boredoms' 77 BoaDrum event in 2007.

Since 2017, Harrison has been the producer for Guided by Voices, as well as their albums from 2017 onward being recorded at Serious Business Music.

=== Andy Ross ===
Within Serious Business, Andy Ross was a member of the bands Unsacred Hearts and DraculaZombieUSA, and is the front-man of Secret Dakota Ring. He also developed the entire backend of the Serious Business Records website.

After moving to California in late 2004, Ross joined OK Go in February 2005.

== Press and gigs ==
Serious Business artists have been featured in Time Out NY, Allmusic, and the Allmusic Blog. Allmusic writes this about Serious Business Music:

You have to love a record label that isn't driven by profits, hipness, or some misguided attempt to capture and define a style. New York-based label Serious Business is a label of love — love for music of all kinds.

Serious Business bands have played prolifically in and around the New York area, including 3 CMJ Showcases, the Knitting Factory, Pianos, the Highline Ballroom, and the Bowery Ballroom.
