= Premakumar Gunaratnam =

Political activist in Sri Lanka

- பிரேமகுமார் குணரத்னம் ප්‍රේමකුමාර් ගුණරත්නම්
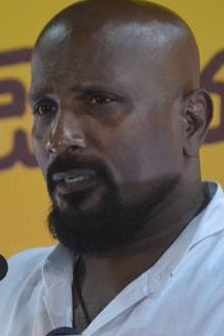
- Founding General Secretary of FLSP, former Political Bureau member of JVP, Sri Lanka

General Secretary
- Incumbent
- Assumed office 9 April 2012

Personal details
- Born: Premakumar Gunaratnam; 18 November 1965 (age 60) Kegalle, Sri Lanka
- Spouse: Champa Somaratna
- Children: 2
- Occupation: Politician

Premakumar Gunaratnam (Note: Aliases include: Kumar Mahattaya, Daskon Mudiyanselage Dayalal, Noel Mudalige) (born 18 November 1965) is a Sri Lankan-Australian politician. He is a former JVP leader and political activist in Sri Lanka who later split from the JVP to form the Frontline Socialist Party in 2012. He has served as the general secretary of the party since its founding.

== Early life ==
Gunaratnam was born on 18 November 1965 to Aadheemoolam Pillai Gunaratnam from Alaveddy in Jaffna, and Valliamma Rajamany from Kegalle. He was educated in St. Mary's College, Kegalle, and Pinnawala Central College, Rambukkana. He entered the University of Peradeniya Faculty of Engineering and became a student leader within a short while after entering the university. He did not complete his degree; although his profession is stated as an "engineer". He is married to a Sinhalese doctor, Champa Somaratna, an Australian resident.

== Political career ==
During the 1987–1989 JVP insurrection, Gunaratnam functioned as the leader of the Deshapremi Janatha Viyaparaya (DJV) in Trincomalee, he was also the contact point between the JVP and Tamil Marxist groups. Touted as an explosives expert, he allegedly masterminded the JVP attack on the Pallekele army camp and several other attacks. After the death of Ranjitham, Gunaratnam operated under his brother's name. He was arrested and imprisoned at Bogambara Prison but escaped after tunnelling his way out of prison on 13 December 1988. He subsequently fled the country, reportedly via sea route as the military launched a manhunt.

=== Split from the JVP ===
Despite Gunaratnam's leadership skills, JVP leaders denied the existence of a party member by the name of "Premakumar Gunaratnam". In April 2012, internal tensions within the party heated up between hardline socialist Gunaratnam and party leader Somawansa Amarasinghe. The JVP media unit was shut down as more members began to extend their support to Gunaratnam.

Former JVP politburo member Dimuthu Attygalle, who was the former head of the JVP women's wing and the party leader in several districts, extended his support for Gunaratnam. Another former politburo member, Pubudu Jagoda who was an active member in the youth movement, also declared his support. Several student union leaders such as Duminda Nagamuwa, Udul Premaratne and Chameera Koswatte also sided with Gunaratnam. The same month, Gunaratnam and the dissident group split from the JVP and formed a new Marxist party known as the Frontline Socialist Party (FSP).

=== Wanted status ===
In April 2012, the Ministry of External Affairs said that Gunaratnam had violated immigration laws and was deported. Police spokesman SP Ajith Rohana said that Gunaratnam was not wanted by the law.

=== Arrest and release ===
Gunaratnam was arrested in November 2015 for violating Immigration and Emigration Laws after arriving in the country on a tourist visa. He was released on 2 December 2016 after serving his prison term. He received Sri Lankan citizenship in February 2017 and was directed to remove his Australian citizenship.
