= The Two Man Gentlemen Band =

US musical duo

- Origin: New York, NY
- Genres: Jazz; Americana; Western swing
- Years active: 2005–present
- Labels: Serious Business; Free Dirt; Bean-Tone
- Members: Andy Bean; Fuller Condon

The Two Man Gentlemen Band are a modern musical duo consisting of Andy Bean (lead vocals, tenor guitar, banjo) and Fuller Condon (upright bass, backing vocals). Their musical style is drawn from the tradition of Slim & Slam, and incorporates a contemporary mix of early jazz, western swing, and vaudeville with humorous lyrics. The Two Man Gentlemen Band have released eight studio albums. Their most recent album, Enthusiastic Attempts at Hot Jazz & Swing Band Favorites, was released by Bean-Tone Records in 2014.

== Career ==
Andy Bean and Fuller Condon began as a full-time busking act in New York City's Central Park and the surrounding area in 2005. Their first album, Two Man Gentlemen Band, was released the same year. In 2007, the Gentlemen went on their first tour, and have since toured throughout the United States, United Kingdom, and Europe hit the road for their first tour, and have been touring around the world since, having opened for Willie Nelson and Bob Dylan.

In 2013, Andy Bean of the Two Man Gentlemen Band became the music composer for the Disney cartoon series Wander Over Yonder. The main title theme song for the series is performed by The Two Man Gentlemen Band. Another widely-known song by the band is "Me, I Get High on Reefer".

The Gentlemen, Andy and Fuller, have relocated to Los Angeles, CA and Charleston, SC, respectively, but continue to work and tour together.

== Discography ==
- 2005: The Two Man Gentlemen Band (Serious Business Records)
- 2006: Great Calamities (Serious Business Records)
- 2008: Heavy Petting (Serious Business Records)
- 2009: Drip Dryin' (Serious Business Records)
- 2010: Live in New York (Serious Business Records)
- 2010: !Dos Amigos, Una Fiesta! (Serious Business Records)
- 2011: Prescription Drugs (We're Having a Party!) / Tikka Masala (Free Dirt Records)
- 2012: Two at a Time (Bean-Tone Records)
- 2014: Enthusiastic Attempts at Hot Jazz & Swing Band Favorites

== Awards ==
In 2013, Andy Bean was nominated for an Annie Award for Outstanding Achievement in Music for his work in Wander Over Yonder
