= Transmatic =

- Origin: Indianapolis, Indiana, United States
- Genres: Post-grunge; hard rock; nu metal; alternative metal; alternative rock
- Years active: 1999–2003
- Labels: Immortal; Virgin
- Past members: Zack Baldauf; Joey Fingers; Andy Carrell; Kirk Frederickson; Scott Rainey

Transmatic was an American rock band from Indianapolis, Indiana. They released one EP on the website Loudenergy.com and a full-length album on Immortal Records and Virgin Records which spawned a minor hit single with 2002's "Come" before breaking up in 2003.

== History ==
The Indiana rock band posted an mp3 of the tune "Blind Spot" on the website Loudenergy.com, and the tune was heard by website executive and former Social Distortion bassist John Maurer. Maurer hooked them up with producer Brad Wood (Pete Yorn, Liz Phair), and they recorded a demo EP soon after. At that time, achieving fame as a musician based on internet exposure was somewhat unprecedented, and the group received significant press coverage as a result. Signing a massive, six-album deal with Immortal/Virgin, the group made its first full-length record with producer, Neal Avron (Fall Out Boy, Everclear, Sara Bareilles), and released the self-titled album on November 9, 2001. Cuts from the album can be found in movies like Van Wilder and American Pie 2, along with shows like MTV's Real World, Pimp My Ride, Boston Public, among others. Transmatic toured with acts like Michelle Branch and Tantric, and the album's lead single, "Come", peaked at No. 29 on the Billboard Adult Top 40 charts early in 2002, but it was their only charting hit. The group broke up in 2003, and did not release any further material; group member Zack Baldauf went on to form the Virgin Millionaires.

== Members ==
- Zack Baldauf - guitar
- Joey Fingers - vocals
- Andy Carrell - bass
- Kirk Frederickson - drums
- Scott Rainey - guitar
