= Patriotic People's Armed Troops =

Former paramilitary organization in Sri Lanka

- Sinhala: දේශප්‍රේමී ජනතා සන්නද්ධ බලකාය, romanized: Deshaprēmi Janathā Sannaddha balakāya
- Active: 1987 to 1989
- Disbanded: By the SLAF in 1990
- Role: Assault; Assassinations
- Engagements: Raid on SLAF Pallekele; Attack on KDA; Attack on SLAF in Katunayake

Patriotic People's Armed Troops (Sinhala: දේශප්‍රේමී ජනතා සන්නද්ධ බලකාය, romanized: Deshaprēmi Janathā Sannaddha balakāya; abbreviated DJS or PPAt) was a militant organization in Sri Lanka. The organization was recognized as a military arm of the Marxist Janatha Vimukthi Peramuna (JVP; People's Liberation Front), which was attempting to overthrow the government of Sri Lanka.

== Background of foundation ==
The Indo-Sri Lanka Peace Accord was signed in Colombo on 29 July 1987, between Indian Prime Minister Rajiv Gandhi and Sri Lankan President J. R. Jayewardene. The accord was expected to resolve the Sri Lankan Civil War by enabling the Thirteenth Amendment to the Constitution of Sri Lanka. It brought the Provincial Councils Act of 1987. Under the terms of the agreement, Colombo agreed to give limited autonomy to the provinces, Indian Army unit, Indian Peace Keeping Force (IPKF) was deployed to militarily protect the accord.

=== Southern insurgency ===
As the accord was seen by Sinhalese extremists as a conscious betrayal by the government of Sri Lanka, Janatha Vimukthi Peramuna (JVP), led an insurgency in South, west, and Centre of the country; it formed multiple organizations in around the Peradeniya area, organizations that received training under the JVP were affiliated to the Socialist Students' Union.

== Operation ==
The PPAt along with the DJV were frontal organizations of the JVP. Between 1987–1989 JVP carried out attacks on civilians and raids against Sri Lanka Armed Forces (SLAF) military installments.

The PPAt was operating as a military arm of the JVP; it raided the Sri Lankan Army camp in Pallekele, John Kotelawela Defense Academy, and the SLAF Katunayake Sri Lanka Air Force base. Similarly, multiple other military arms affiliated to the JVP carried out attacks under the orders of the Joint Command of the PPAt. On April 29, 1988, the Joint Command ordered the attack on the Pannala Air Force base. Over 500 weapons and 50,000 rounds of ammunition were taken.

== Death threats ==
The Joint Command, Patriotic People's Armed Troops issued death threats calling government troops (SLA, SLAiF, SLN) desert their ranks and to join the PPAt.

A communique revealed that the Joint Command had ordered its armed troops to eliminate individuals who refuse to collaborate. It said that they would not just be dealt as traitors but also enemies of the country by the PPAt.

== See also ==
- Deshapremi Janatha Vyaparaya

== Bibliography ==
- Guneratne, Rohan (1991). Sri Lanka: A lost revolution. Institute of Fundamental Studies.
- Chandraprema, C. A. (1991). Sri Lanka: The years of terror.
- Guneratne, Rohan (1987). War and Peace in Sri Lanka. Institute of Fundamental Studies.
- Alles, C. (1991). The J.V.P., 1969–1989.
- Jayatileke, Tissa; de Silva, R. M. (1997). Peradeniya.
