= Bruno Wizard =

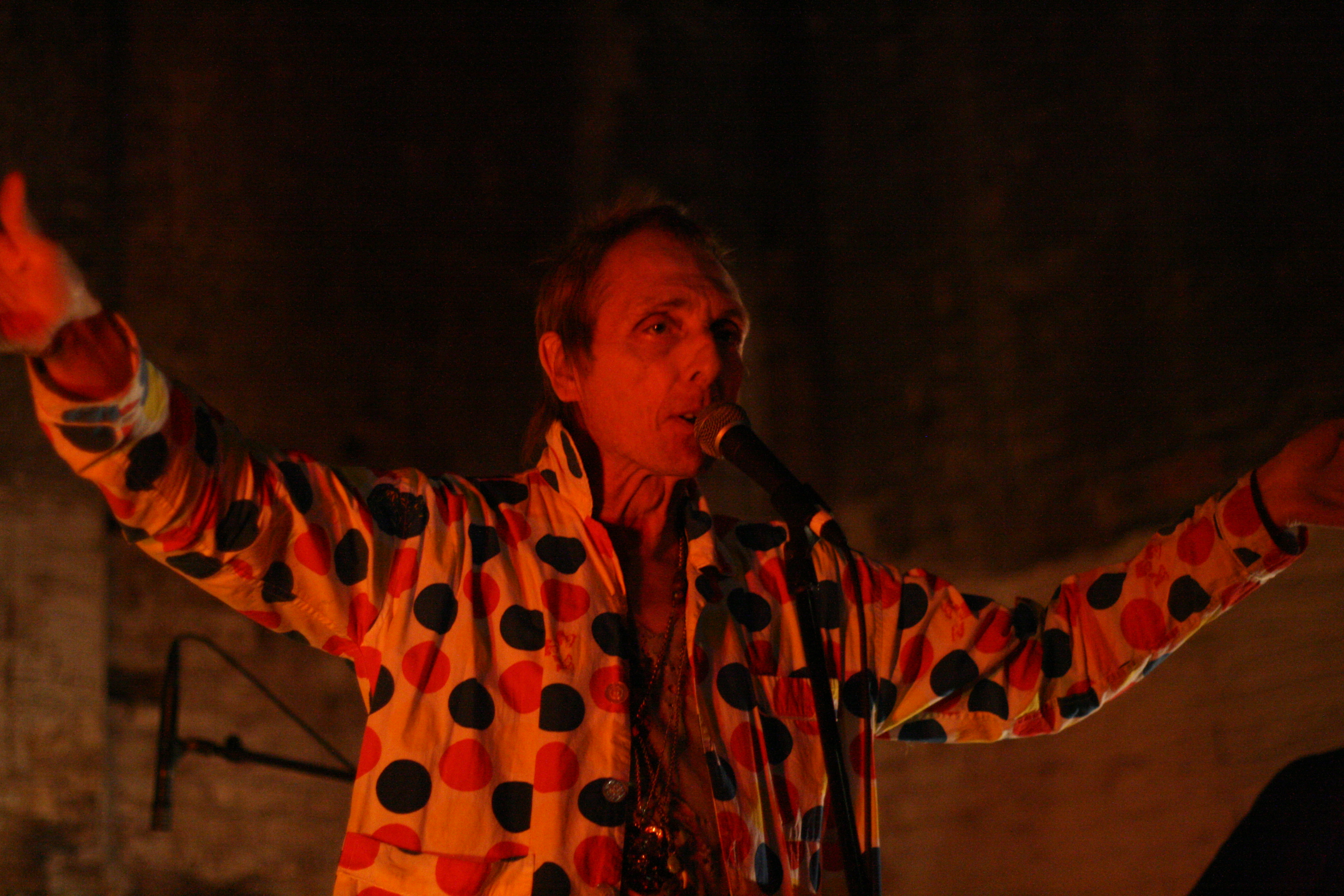
Bruno Wizard in 2008

Bruno Aleph Wizard (born Stanley Bernard McQuilan, 1950) is the founder, principal singer and co-writer of the punk groups The Homosexuals and The Rejects. Wizard is also a noted player of the harmonica.

Originally active between 1978 and 1985, Wizard reformed The Homosexuals with new line-ups from 2003. He has been interviewed as a pundit for British television programmes. In 2013 a fly-on-the-wall documentary about his life, The Heart of Bruno Wizard, was screened at The East End Film Festival.
