= Virgin Millionaires =

American rock band

- Origin: Indianapolis, Indiana, United States
- Genres: Alternative rock
- Years active: 2002–present
- Label: Elevated
- Members: Zack Baldauf; Jordan Enyart; Michael Carson; KC Carson
- Website: www.virginmillionaires.com

Virgin Millionaires are an American rock band from Indianapolis, Indiana. Founded by Zach Baldauf after three years as the guitarist of Transmatic. With the success of their EP the band began doing shows with bands like Kid Rock, 311, Hoobastank, and Puddle of Mudd. In 2006, they played at the opening of the Indianapolis 500. The band did a mini-spring 2008 tour with the band Hurt in the Midwest and summer 2008 had the band playing dates with artists including Daughtry, Sugar Ray, Spin Doctors, Spill Canvas and Matt Nathanson.

The band was an early adopter of MySpace Music and was at times ranked, based on song plays, as the "Top Unsigned Artist" in the state of Indiana in the mid-2000s. The band has been dormant since the release of the Murdered Out EP in 2011 and has had no active social media presence, music releases, or live performances for the last decade.

== Members ==
- Zack Baldauf – lead vocals and guitar
- Michael Carson – bass and vocals
- KC Carson – guitar
- Derek Hanson – drums

Former members

- Ryan Flynn – bass
- Matt Carter – guitar
- Dave "Moose" Kuehl – bass
- Jordan Enyart – guitar and vocals
- Ryan Scarbrough- drums
- Scott Krueckeberg – bass
- Nick Sommers – guitar
- Kyle Mayfield – guitar

== Discography ==
- Virgin Millionaires (2007)
- Facedown (2009 City Hands)
- Murdered Out (2011 City Hands)
