= Dave Golden =

American musician

- Born: David Adam Ochs Golden; December 24, 1978 (age 47)
- Education: B.A. Williams College
- Occupation: Musician
- Parent(s): June Tauber Golden; Stephen Arthur Ochs Golden

Dave Golden (born December 24, 1978) is a musician and a Fulbright Scholar. His plays stringed instruments, composes and produces music, including jazz, classical and folk. He also works as a music supervisor and music editor for film.

== Early life and education ==
Golden was born on December 24, 1978, in New York City, the son of June (née Tauber) and Stephen Arthur Ochs Golden. His father was a lawyer in Tucson. His paternal grandmother is Ruth Sulzberger Golden; his paternal great-grandfather is Arthur Hays Sulzberger. His parents divorced when he was a child and his father remarried to Brenda L. Sanchez.

== Jazz Years, 1996-97 ==
Golden's first noteworthy work was in 1996, playing upright bass in a New York City-based jazz sextet with Charlie Looker and Max Bernstein. They gained recognition from Downbeat Magazine and were launched on a European tour, at the behest of the organizers of the 1997 Montreux Jazz Festival, where they played five performances. The group mixed Golden and Looker's avant garde compositions alongside standards and lesser-known elements of the jazz canon.

Golden left the music world in 1997 and worked a job at a Finnish paper mill before returning to the US. He earned a degree from Williams College and while there he joined the National Ski Patrol and started a jazz trio with Leehom Wang.

== Country, Folk and Rock Years, 2004-present ==
Golden resurfaced on the music scene during the Summer of 2004, where he toured the festival circuit playing a guitar and mandolin-based repertoire of folk and blues-inspired pieces. In 2004 and 2005, the Future of Music Coalition awarded him with back-to-back Fellowships and a review from Entertainment Today led to a meeting with Dylan/Cash producer, Bob Johnston. Johnston, having just left a decades-long tenure at Columbia Records, lauded Golden's songwriting and invited him to record for his new label, JAM.

Golden's career got another boost after Nuvo Newsweekly chose his improvisational encore performance as the highlight of the 2004 Midwest Music Summit. His collaborators at that performance, Chicago's Shelley Miller and New York's Jeremiah Birnbaum, toured with him on and off in 2005 alongside Chicago's Kara Kulpa and Samantha Twigg Johnson. The group called themselves Mercy Driver. Although Mercy Driver only lasted for less than a year, Golden continued to tour through 2005 with individual members of Mercy Driver, while taking breaks to record his debut album in New Orleans. Golden also played a shows with Summer at the Bowery Poetry Club in NYC and The Underground in Philadelphia, PA.

What was to be his debut album as a singer-songwriter, Wake To These Satellites, was never released. A studio error brought the backups to New Orleans in late August 2005 and the album was lost during the floods that followed Katrina. In its place, the dark folk album How To Breathe, was self-released in early 2006 and propelled a more modest tour, but one that saw Golden as a headliner at that summer's Cutting Edge (New Orleans) and Dewey Beach (Delaware) Americana Festivals.

In the Fall of 2006, Golden ended his 2-year tour and returned to the studio. Throughout 2008, Golden has turned up with several different bands supporting him, playing under pseudonyms like Greyeye and The Diesel Blues.

== Awards ==
In 2001, he was awarded a Fulbright Fellowship. In 2004 and 2005, he was awarded a Future of Music Scholarship.

== Film Work, 2003-Present ==
In 2003, Dave Golden began a professional association with director, Adam Salky. Dave's music was used in 2003's Freddy Anxiety and he scored 2004's Sometimes the Neighbor for piano and cello. In 2006, Golden penned "Pillbox," as a closing song for Jenise Treuting's Japanese film, Invitations and Ultimatums. In 2008, he returned to working with Salky, this time as music supervisor for Dare. The following year, Golden was music supervisor on Ten Years Later and Night Catches Us.
