= Tilvin Silva =

Sri Lankan politician (born 1956)

- ටිල්වින් සිල්වා டில்வின் சில்வா
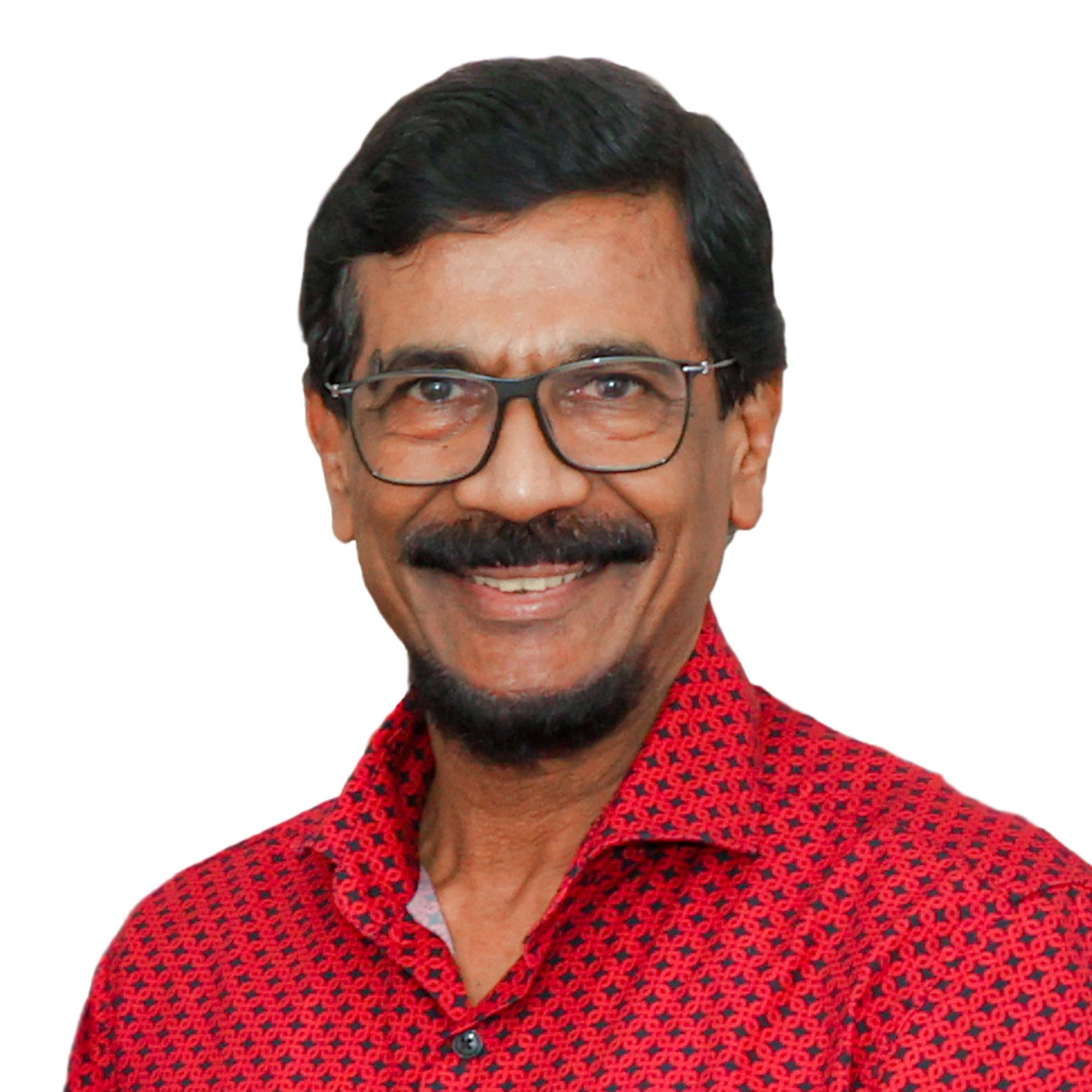

3rd General Secretary of the Janatha Vimukthi Peramuna
- Incumbent
- Assumed office 1995
- Leader: Somawansa Amarasinghe; Anura Kumara Dissanayake
- Preceded by: Somawansa Amarasinghe

Personal details
- Born: Mesthree Tilvin Silva; 26 February 1956 (age 70) Mulapitiya Beruwala, Dominion of Ceylon
- Party: Janatha Vimukthi Peramuna (since 1978)
- Other political affiliations: National People's Power (Since 2019); United People's Freedom Alliance (2004–2005)
- Education: Aluthgama Maha Vidyalaya; Beruwala Mangala Privena; Kande Vihara Vidyalaya
- Occupation: Politician

Military service
- Battles/wars: Second JVP Insurrection

Mesthree Tilvin Silva (Sinhala: ටිල්වින් සිල්වා, Tamil: டில்வின் சில்வா; born 26 February 1956) is a Sri Lankan Marxist politician serving as the General Secretary of the Janatha Vimukthi Peramuna (JVP) and a founding member of the NPP. Silva has played a significant role in shaping the JVP's policies and strategies, particularly focusing on social justice, anti-corruption, and economic reforms. He has been described as one the closet allies of the president Anura Kumara Dissanayake.

== Early life ==
Tilvin Silva was born as the eldest of a family of five with three brothers and one sister on 26 February 1956 in Mullapitiya, Beruwala, Kalutara District. His father was a woodworker near the town of Beruwala. He was educated at Kande Vihara Vidyalaya, Beruwala Mangala Privena and Aluthgama Maha Vidyalaya. In 1976, Silva started working at a tourist hotel in Moragalla before the start of the Sri Lanka Civil War.

== Political career ==
=== 1987-1989 insurrection ===
Silva joined JVP in 1978 at age 22, after its ban had been lifted by J. R. Jayewardene and the party entered mainstream politics following its failed 1971 JVP insurrection against the Government of Ceylon. The JVP launched its second armed uprising known as the 1987–1989 JVP insurrection against the Government of Sri Lanka for what it called the betrayal of the country to India and the invasion of Indian Forces.

Tilvin Silva took part in the JVP revolution leading attacks against the Sri Lankan Government and its armed forces as a JVP district leader. He was one of the few district leaders who survived the brutal counter-insurgency operations of the Sri Lankan Armed Forces that led to the capture and deaths of the JVP leader Rohana Wijeweera and much of its Politburo, except for Somawansa Amarasinghe who fled into exile. Silva survived since he was arrested 1987 and serving seven years in prison. Speaking of the 1987–1989 JVP insurrection, Tilvin Silva has described it as a patriotic struggle for socialism, which was superior to the Great Rebellion of 1817–1818 and the Matale rebellion.

=== Re-establishing the JVP ===
After release from prison, Silva became the new General Secretary of JVP in 1995, after its ban was lifted and the party began operating in formal politics under the leadership of Amarasinghe. Under Silva's leadership, the party has focused on advocating for socialist policies, anti-imperialism, and left-wing nationalism. Silva with Wimal Weerawansa became the two high-profile leaders of the JVP during Amarasinghe's exile from 1990 to 2004. The party won 39 seats in the 2004 Sri Lankan parliamentary election and became a partner in the government.
