= Galkatas =

Widespread illegal homemade hand gun type in Sri Lanka

Galkatas is a common name for the widespread illegal homemade hand gun type in Sri Lanka. There is not any unique or identical shape for this but it is known to fire 9mm or .38 ammunition and even 7.62×39mm Soviet M1943 rounds.

The galkatas is famous among the local underground groups. It is the weapon responsible for most of the homicides committed in Sri Lanka. The weapon is made by local blacksmiths, and due to this, it has many mechanical defects.
