= The Homosexuals =

English punk band

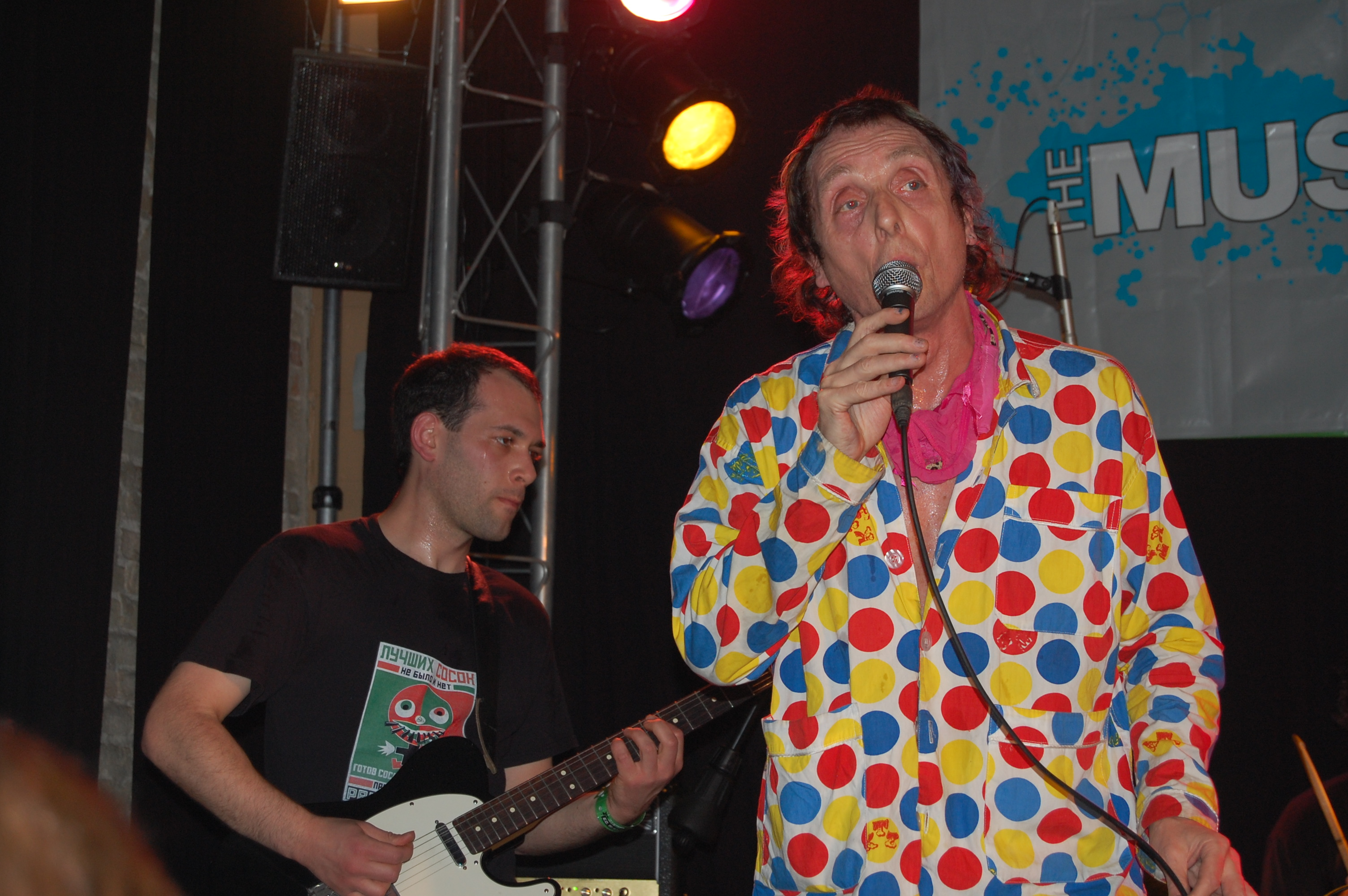
- The Homosexuals at SXSW (2009)

Background information
- Origin: London, England
- Genres: Punk rock; post-punk
- Years active: 1978–present
- Labels: Lorelei, Black Noise, Recommended Records, Hyped to Death, Serious Business Records, Goldmine Recordings
- Members: Bruno Wizard; Ben Harris; Dima Vincent; Niall Morosini
- Past members: Anton Hayman; Jim Welton; Stevie Savage; Susan Vida; Joel Amie; James Belmonte; Glenn Clift; Dan Fatel; Mike Dos Santos; Travis Harrison; Dave Siegel; Julian Bennett Holmes; Jonathan Edelstein; Tom Oakes; John Mathews; Charlie Sundown

The Homosexuals are an English punk/post-punk band. The band have been described as "punk visionaries".

== History ==
=== The Rejects (1976–1977) ===
The Rejects were formed in the bar of Goldsmiths College in South London in 1976, when ex-Sunderland art school students John Hazzard (real name: John Wilkins) and Glenn Hutchinson recruited Bruno Wizard (real name: Bruno McQuillan) to drum for their nascent band. He in turn introduced them to Howard H, a well known drummer, and as rehearsals got under way, Wizard took on the role of frontman and Hutchinson was sidelined. Wizard then recruited Ian Kane, who added more songs to Hazzard's original set of compositions, and to express his disquiet with the modern world and disappointment with his 1960s heroes. The Rejects played their first gig at punk club The Roxy in January 1977, without a bass player, supporting the Damned and the Vibrators. In the following five months, the Rejects played with Wire, Generation X, the Jam, Eater, 999 and Sham 69 on multiple occasions, with Wizard becoming increasingly confrontational (though no more tuneful) to their audiences. Performances routinely descended into violence, with dates at the Albany in Deptford and Barbarella's in Birmingham confirming the band as a bad risk for PA hire companies.

In the summer of 1977, Hazzard was dropped from the band, going on to form the proto-thrash group Auto da Fe. Wizard recruited Jim Welton on bass for a new lineup of the Rejects, which included David Dus on drums and occasional itinerant guitarists, including Stevie Savage and Jerry Wigens. Dus was the drummer for Wayne County (later to become Jayne) during their 1977 tour of the UK. Wizard set up auditions to find a permanent guitarist, and Anton Hayman was recruited.

=== The Homosexuals (1978–1985) ===
For Wizard, the name "the Rejects" was too deeply embedded in what he regarded as "the new conformity of punk", leading to the name change to the Homosexuals. Dus could not take being in a band called the Homosexuals and duly left, although Welton and Hayman approved of the change and remained. The band then lived in a series of squats while making music and recording. Their angular guitars, complex melodies and experimental leanings distanced them somewhat from the punk rock being created by their contemporaries and cemented their reputation as a precursor to post-punk. The band's work during this period would lead to their later recognition as a pioneer of D.I.Y., along with such bands as This Heat, Desperate Bicycles and Swell Maps. They released few recordings during their initial lifetime, and most of what did appear was in small vinyl runs on self-funded labels. The bulk of the band's studio material was recorded at Surrey Sound during 1978–79 with producer Chris Gray; the 16-track studio was run by Gray and his brother Nigel (who produced albums by the Police and Siouxsie and the Banshees). Wizard refused to perform on "the circuit" and thus the Homosexuals only did a handful of gigs, and refused to do interviews. Despite this lack of visibility, their debut 7", Hearts in Exile, pressed in an edition of 2,000 copies, still managed to sell out in a few days. A self-titled EP followed.

Welton left the band in 1980, forming Amos & Sara with Chris Gray; Wizard and Hayman continued recording as the Homosexuals, along with visual artist and sometime vocalist Susan Vida, releasing a cassette of material in 1982 before disbanding in 1985. The only full-length album by the band, The Homosexuals' Record (1984), was compiled by Recommended Records from existing studio masters and rough cassette mixes of the Surrey Sound recordings. The LP was reissued in 2004 as a remastered CD, with additional tracks, as The Homosexuals' CD. Also released that year was Astral Glamour, a 3-CD set including the band's entire catalogue, unreleased songs and work by several of the band's pseudonymous projects.

=== Side projects ===
The band members recorded in various combinations under several different pseudonyms. These side projects included Ici la Bas, Sir Alick & the Phraser, and George Harassment, all released on Bruno's Black Noise label. Contrary to often cited information about Homosexuals side projects, L. Voag's The Way Out (1979) was a Jim Welton solo album recorded during downtime between recording sessions at Surrey Sound. All releases on the It's War Boys label, including Amos & Sara, Sara Goes Pop, Nancy Sesay & the Melodaires, Milk from Cheltenham, and the Just Measurers, were also Welton projects (many involving Homosexuals producer Chris Gray) after he had left the band.

=== Reformation (2003 to present) ===
Wizard reformed the Homosexuals in late 2003, playing with talented young musicians Dima Vincent and Sasha Reva from Ukraine. In 2004, this version of the band, along with former member Vida, launched Astral Glamour on Hyped2Death at Cobden's Art Club in Notting Hill Gate. This coincided with a major art exhibition of Vida's work at the same venue. Dima Vincent played the guitar with The Homosexuals from 2003 - 2006, after the departure formed a band called Found on Vincent Ward together with Ayşe Hassan (bass player from Savages). Celeste Bell, Poly Styrene's daughter on backing vocals (2005). Around this time, Wizard met Ben Harris, who was playing with the Affectionate Punch. After discussing their musical backgrounds and approaches, Harris was enlisted to play bass at their next gig, five days later, after which he became a permanent feature in the European lineup. After three shows with Hayman back on guitar, Wizard travelled to New York City (which he had been visiting since 1986) and worked with Imaginary Icons as his backing band.

Wizard put together another lineup of the Homosexuals in late 2007, including bassist Mike Dos Santos (of Apache Beat, Brendan Benson and the Realistics), drummer Travis Harrison (the owner of label Serious Business Records), and guitarist Dave Siegel (a childhood friend of Harrison). Their fierce live performances, a combination of classic and new material paired with experimental explorations and free improvisational pieces, seemed to herald a new era for the band. In 2008, a fresh body of work was recorded at Serious Business' Soho studio, some of which was documented on the limited edition Love Guns? EP. A full album titled Important If True was suspended from release the following year while negotiations took place between Wizard and Harrison, but later released online. During the recording of this material, Harrison was being courted by digital distribution and licensing company The Orchard, for his label's catalogue. At the time, The Orchard already handled the digital distribution for The Homosexuals' CD and Astral Glamour, an agreement which ended 30 June 2009, and were keen to secure the rights to the material being worked on with Wizard and Serious Business. To this effect, Wizard performed some of the new material at The Orchard's office in Manhattan, and Harrison and Serious Business signed their current catalogue to The Orchard. Unfortunately, there was never any legal agreement between Wizard and Harrison for any of this material to be assigned anywhere. The matter has yet to be resolved.

Given Wizard's distrust and loathing of "the traditional music industry", the situation between him and Harrison meant that Harrison's drumming position in the band was untenable. His exit from the band was swiftly followed by that of Siegel. Within three days, their replacements, Julian Bennett Holmes and Jonathan Edelstein of Brooklyn band Fiasco, were on the road to Boston as the Homosexuals to play alongside King Khan and the Shrines. This lineup also played at Club Europa in New York with Monotonix before Wizard's return to London to meet his UK and European playing and recording commitments. While in London, Wizard worked on new songs, some in collaboration with Hayman, his original co-writer with the Homosexuals.

As of 2014, Bruno was still performing regularly as the Homosexuals, with the band including Harris, Tom Oakes, John Mathews and Charlie Sundown.

From 2016 - Bruno starts to collaborate again with a guitarist Dima Vincent and with an original (1970's) Homosexuals drummer Niall Morosini.

=== Films about members of the Homosexuals ===
First screened in 2003, The Way Out, a Portrait of Xentos Jones by Scottish artists Luke Fowler and Kosten Koper was an experimental film portrait of ex-Homosexuals bass player Jim Welton.

The Heart Of Bruno Wizard (2013), directed by Elisabeth Rasmussen, was a feature-length documentary on the band's lead singer/songwriter and sole remaining original member.

== Discography ==
=== Studio albums ===
- Venceremos cassette (1982, Black Noise)
- The Homosexuals' Record LP (1984, Recommended Records)

as Sir Alick and the Phraser

- In Search of the Perfect Baby (1980, Black Noise)

as George Harassment

- Masai Sleep Walking (1983, Black Noise)

=== Singles ===
- Hearts in Exile 7" (1978, Lorelei)
- Bigger Than the Number...Yet Missing the Dot 7" (1981, Black Noise)

=== EPs ===
- The Homosexuals EP 12" (1982, Black Noise)
- Love Guns? 10" EP (November 2008, Serious Business Records)
- Split EP 10" split EP with Melody Nelson (2012, Goldmine Recordings)

as Ici La Bas

- Ici La Bas 12" (1982, Black Noise)

=== Compilation albums ===
- Astral Glamour 3-CD box set (June 2004, Hyped to Death/Messthetics)
