= Man in Gray =

American noise rock band

- Origin: Brooklyn, New York, U.S.
- Genres: Indie rock
- Years active: 2001–2008
- Label: Serious Business Records
- Members: Bryan Bruchman (guitar); Christina Da Costa (vocals); Jared Friedman (bass); Jeremy Joseph (guitar); Jeremiah McVay (drums)
- Past members: Dan Wholey (bass, guitar, vocals)
- Website: Official Website

Man in Gray was a noise rock band based in Brooklyn/New York City. Their debut EP, entitled No Day/No Night, received critical praise with much of the attention centered on the track titled "Incommunicado," which was listed by Village Voice music editor Chuck Eddy in the publication's annual critics poll. Their next effort was a split 7-inch EP with fellow New York band and Serious Business Records label-mate the Unsacred Hearts.

== Discography ==
- No Day/No Night (2004, EP - Serious Business Records)
- Man In Gray/Unsacred Hearts Split 7-inch w/ Unsacred Hearts (2005, EP - Serious Business Records)
- I Can't Sleep Unless I Hear You Breathing (2007, LP - Serious Business Records)

== Tour dates ==
Date	City	Venue	Notes
2007
17 October 2007	Brooklyn, NY	Bar Matchless	w/ Unsacred Hearts, Kickstart, Man in Gray, Goes Cube, Hull
22 September 2007	Brooklyn, NY	Brooklyn Bretta	w/ Breakup Breakdown, El Jezel, Frauke
15 September 2007	NYC, NY	The Delancey	Hot Rocks Part w/ Alendbarton, Bridges+Powerlines
9 September 2007	New Brunswick, NJ	Yoga Vayu	w/ Gold Streets, Screaming Females, Full of Fancy
8 September 2007	Allston, MA	O'Brien's	w/ The Beatings, Jaguar Club, I Have Ears
15 August 2007	Charlotte, NC	Snug Harbor	StereoactiveNYC Roadshow w/ Gold Streets, Red Limo
17 August 2007	Raleigh, NC	Slim's Downtown	StereoactiveNYC Roadshow w/ Gold Streets, The Dynamite Brothers
16 August 2007	Norfolk, VA	The Boot	StereoactiveNYC Roadshow w/ Gold Streets, Churn
15 August 2007	Brooklyn, NY	Union Hall	StereoactiveNYC Roadshow w/ Gold Streets, She Keeps Bees
9 June 2007	Toronto, ON, Canada	Kathedral	North By Northeast Showcase w/ The Beasts of Eden, Secret Broadcast, Kid Metropolis, The Motion Sick
2 June 2007	Brooklyn, NY	Union Hall	I Can't Sleep Unless I Hear You Breathing Record release show w/ The Gang, Screaming Females, The Lisps, Music Slut DJs
19 May 2007	Brooklyn, NY	Bar Matchless	"Fresh Cut" w/ Butterfly Assassins, Creaky Boards, Easy Anthems
3 May 2007	Brooklyn, NY	Luna Lounge	w/ Smyer, Nervous Cabaret, Up the Empire
24 April 2007	NYC, NY	Mercury Lounge	w/ Pela (record release show), Takka Takka, Project Jenny Project Jan
29 March 2007	NYC, NY	The Annex	w/ Western Civ, Rob Holzer, Gold Streets
10 March 2007	Washington, DC	house show	w/ Mancino, BrainFang
9 March 2007	NYC, NY	Hot Rocks Party	w/ Morning Theft, the Attorneys
27 January 2007	Brooklyn, NY	Union Hall	w/ The Films (Warner Bros.) + The Jealous Girlfriends
14 January 2007	NYC, NY	Arlene's Grocery	Amateur Female Jello Wrestling party w/ El Jezel
13 January 2007	Brooklyn, NY	Club Europa	w/ Nakatomi Plaza, Avec, Falkonr, SHLSHKD
2006
14 December 2006	Brooklyn, NY	Union Pool	w/ the Rinse, the Shapes, the Spies
2 December 2006	NYC, NY	The Delancey	The Music Slut party w/ the Vibration, Exit Clov, Nous Non Plus, DJ Brad Walsh
18 November 2006	Washington, DC	The Red and the Black	w/ Brainfang, 3Starkarma, Beanstalk Library
	Brooklyn, NY	The Syrup Room	w/ Takka Takka, the Harlem Shakes, Dragons of Zynth, Illinois, Finger on the Pulse DJs
1 November 2006	NYC, NY	Knitting Factory Old Office	Serious Business Records CMJ Marathon 2006 Showcase w/ DraculaZombieUSA, Kickstart, the Two Man Gentlemen Band, the Octagon, the Unsacred Hearts.
14 October 2006	Baltimore, MD	Ottobar	Big Art Show w/ The Mishaps, Squaaks, Jason Dove, Mossyrock.
13 October 2006	Brooklyn, NY	Bar Matchless	w/ Divide and Swinger Eight
7 October 2006	New Brunswick, NJ	The Parlor - 233 Hamilton Ave	w/ Screaming Females, the Volunteers, Pineapple Island Tribesmen
29 September 2006	NYC, NY	The Delancey	Jezebel Music presents BANDS @ w/ Via Audio, Mancino, Hexa
16 September 2006	Norfolk, VA	Relative Theory Records	w/ Mass Movement of the Moth + The Max Levine Ensemble
15 September 2006	Brooklyn, NY	The Hook	w/ ESG, Northern State, and DJ Tim Sweeney (Beats in Space/DFA Records)
9 September 2006	Fairplay, CO	The Park Bar	South Park Music Fest ManiaTV.com "International Showcase" w/ the Swayback, Munly & the Lee Lewis Harlots, Stone Deaf, Big Bang, Greg Johnson, Lux
26 August 2006	Brooklyn, NY	Asterisk Art Project	w / Athletic Automaton, Made in Mexico, the White Mice, ADD, Dirty Magazine
25 August 2006	Philadelphia, PA	Barbary	"Think Rich, Look Poor" @ w / The Bottom Lip + Lebaron
12 August 2006	Indianapolis, IN	Indy CD + Vinyl	Midwest Music Summit showcase w/ The Carter Administration, Apollo Up!, Forget Cassettes, Ghost in Light
11 August 2006	Ann Arbor, MI	WAR house - 713 Miller Ave	w/ The Pussy Pirates, Kate Starr, Mike Frankhouse
5 August 2006	Baltimore, MD	Hamilton Arts Collective	ACORN benefit "B'More to 504" w/ 30 Helens, The Upwelling
28 July 2007	NYC, NY	Pussycat Lounge, 96 Greenwich St	The Problem's record release show w/ My Little Pony, Rick Barry, April Smith, Mattison
22 July	Philadelphia, PA	Lazertown, 3245 Amber St	Big Art Show w / Mossyrock, the Kick Me's, Deleted Scenes
7 July 2006	Brooklyn, NY	Brooklyn Lyceum	Terset's "Annihilation 3" record release w/ Terset, Noblesse Oblige, Up the Empire
29 June 2006	NYC, NY	Club Midway	Beg Yr. Pardon #3 w/ Apples Apples, the Pussy Pirates, DraculazombieUSA
1 June 2006	Asbury Park, NJ	Club Deep	the Shark Party w/ The Problem, The Sexes, Settle
6 May 2006	Brooklyn, NY	Asterisk Art Space	Deli Magazine benefit / StereoactiveNYC party w/ Detachment Kit, Goes Cube, the Problem, Emma La Reina, the Diggs, Proton Proton, Apes & Androids, Earl Greyhound, Shaka Zulu Overdrive, Pio Mazzotti, Arbor Day
29 April 2006	Montreal, Canada	L'Escogriffe	w/ the Fool and Dirty Things (Chicago)
26 April 2006	NYC, NY	The Delancey	Death Disco w/ the Song Corporation, Flasher, AplusP, the Wowz, Haunted Horses
24 March 2006	Cincinnati, OH	The Comet Bar	w/ The Luxury Flats
23 March 2006	Chicago, IL	Metro	w/ AMFM, Welcome To Ashley, Public Four
22 March 2006	St. Peters, MO	Sally T's	w/Opposite Attack, With Heart in Hand
20 March 2006	Jackson, MS	WC Dons	
19 March 2006	Houston, TX	SuperHappyFunLand	SXSW Overflow Festival w/ The Dead Betties, Die Die Die, Boss Martians, Cortina, The Bats, Mikaela's Fiend, Run Chico Run, Luke Doucet
18 March 2006	Dallas, TX	Darkside Lounge	w/ Lying in States, Lady of the Lake and The End of the World
17 March 2006	Austin, TX	The Stash	w/La Rocca, Neutral Boy, Adrian and the Sickness
14 March 2006	Lafayette, LA	Caffe Cottage	w/ MattRock & The PowerBoxx
12 March 2006	Florence, AL	Big Ed's	w/ Western Civ
11 March 2006	Bowling Green, KY	Spencer's Coffeehouse	w/ The Greenhouse Poetry Showcase
23 February 2007	Brooklyn, NY	Southpaw	StereoactiveNYC and Serious Business Birthday Bash! w/ DraculaZombieUSA, Unsacred Hearts, Americans UK
11 February 2006	Brooklyn, NY	Sputnik	Big Art Show w/ US Funk Team, Mossyrock
27 January 2006	NYC, NY	Scenic	Indications of Danger party w/ Mistakes, Kudu
