= Deshapremi Janatha Vyaparaya =

Paramilitary organization in Sri Lanka

Patriotic People's Movement
- දේශප්‍රේමී ජනතා ව්‍යාපාරය தேசபக்தி மக்கள் இயக்கம்
- Patriotic People's Movement Logo
- Leader: Keerthi Vijayabahu †
- Founded: 1986
- Dates active: 1987—1989 (armed); until 1991
- Country: Sri Lanka
- Allegiance: People's Liberation Front
- Headquarters: Piliyandala, Colombo
- Active regions: Land Warfare
- Ideology: Communism; Marxism–Leninism; Anti-imperialism; Sinhalese nationalism Ultranationalism
- Political position: Far-left
- Status: Banned since 1988
- Size: 7,000 (claim)

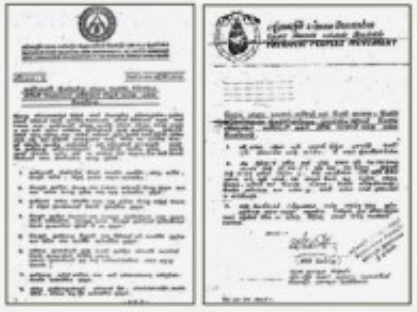
death threats sent out by the DJV

Deshapremi Janatha Vyaparaya (abbreviated as DJV) (දේශප්‍රේමී ජනතා ව්‍යාපාරය; Patriotic People's Movement) was a militant organisation in Sri Lanka. It was widely considered to be the military branch of the Marxist–Leninist Janatha Vimukthi Peramuna and had been designated as a terrorist organisation by the Sri Lankan government.

The DJV operated as an armed organisation from 1987 till 1989. Throughout this period, it perpetrated attacks on the Sri Lankan Armed Forces (SLAF) and those who it claimed to be 'Indian proxy'; a majority of attacks attributed to the Janatha Vimukthi Peramuna, were carried on by guerillas or assassins belonging to the DJV.

== Operation ==
According to most sources, led by Saman Piyasiri Fernando, Keerthi Vijayabahu, the DJV was a military branch of the JVP. The movement was divided into regional sectors based on urban cities. The regional commands developed island-wide would order its troops to attack enemy military installments. The commands were given through the Joint Command of the Patriotic People's Armed Forces. It would also issue death threats to those who serve in the SLAF.

=== Early activity and recognition ===
The first attack attributed to the DJV was the grenade attack that took place in the Sri Lankan parliament. An assailant hurled two grenades, which killed two and wounded 14 including then prime minister Ranasinghe Premadasa, and Lalith Athulathmudali. In the immediate aftermath, the term 'DJV' started to appear in booklets distributed at Colombo, the most populated city of Sri Lanka.

The term 'Deshapremi Janatha Vyaparaya' first got international recognition following its call to the BBC correspondent, John Rettie. The caller who represented the DJV, claimed that it consists of 2,000 active militants. The caller expressed ultranationalist ideals, he claimed "JR must be killed for his autonomy to the Tamil people" The caller further claimed the organization is an independent organization and is not affiliated to the Janatha Vimukthi Peramuna. The president back then, J.R Jayawardene, however, said that this is nothing but a cover organisation of the JVP, he further predicted possible affiliation between it and the Tamil militants in the North Eastern regions of Sri Lanka.

=== As a guerrilla organisation ===
The DJV was made up of youths trained in certain rural areas. These militants were uniformed similarly to the soldiers of the SLAF. The militants patrolled towns at night and attacked politicians mostly from rightist parties and rival leftists. The major target was military bases of the SLAF. Military installments of Sri Lankan Army and Air Force were attacked alongside police stations, these attacks mostly ended in success.

Several weapons recovered by the Sri Lankan Army was stolen from bases in the central province where the JVP had its headquarters.

=== Intimidation tactics ===
The DJV caused violence to intimidate and kill those who supported infamous Indo-Lanka accord. Violence escalated during the 1989 general elections, mostly to intimidate the voters. With violent acts of sabotage and intimidation, it brought the country to standstill. Posters and death threats were passed on to both the public and targeted individuals calling for boycotts of Indian goods and clothing; those who denied the orders were targeted by specific assassins and were assassinated. Assassinations of this manner included the assassinations of film star Vijaya Kumaratunga, Gladys Jayawardene, and K. Gunaratnam. It furthermore targeted newscasters to intimidate the media which served propaganda against it. Sagarika Gomes and allegedly Premakeerthi de Alwis were some of the targeted newscasters. However Premakeerthi's family denies that it was the DJV who killed him, instead they claim government assassins killed him.

== Origin and allegiance ==
DJV was mostly made up of undergraduates from the University of Peradeniya, who made contact to the organisation through the Socialist Students' Union.

While there are multiple official accounts that claim the DJV was the armed wing of the JVP, there is no convincing evidence to confirm this, as the DJV members never swore allegiance to the JVP or any of its party organizations. However, the JVP claims: DJV was founded by JVP to operate as a frontal force.

According to Rohana Wijeweera, the DJV is a patriotic composition of multiple political parties and unions in the country.

=== Tamil militant support ===
As the JVP began its second uprising, many Tamil organisations started providing it arms, regardless of how nationalist was the DJV, and how would it operate against the Tamil minority. A majority of Tamil organizations feared getting overrun by the Indian Peace Keeping Force (IPKF).

Premakumar Gunaratnam and Wijeweera sent troops of the JVP military branch (believed to be DJV) to train in various camps used by Tamil militant groups, more importantly, People's Liberation Organisation of Tamil Eelam (PLOTE). The JVP military branch gave PLOTE a certain amount of lorry engines and was given claymores by PLOTE in return. These claymores were largely used against the Indian and Sri Lankan infantry vehicles.(#In the Northeast)

== After 1989 ==
=== 1989 ===
Following the arrest of Rohana Wijeweera, he was shot on 13 November 1989, either by a comrade, H. B. Herath, as they were on the way to the headquarters of the DJV / JVP, or by the armed forces. Following his death, the leadership of the JVP got transferred to Keerthi Vijayabahu. Herath was executed the same day. As Wijeweera may have revealed the location of the DJV safehouse, the military headquarters of the JVP, it was overrun following a gunfight between the SLAF and the DJV. The Sri Lankan government media released a report on 29 December 1989, as "the leader of the JVP military wing killed along with four other cadres due to the crossfire between security forces and the JVP at their military wing headquarters, a farm located at Piliyandala"

=== Aftermath ===
The DJV ceased to exist after 1989. The JVP however, returned to mainstream politics through elections; the organisation since then had major splits between revolutionaries and democrats.

== List of Attacks ==
DJV attacks are also attributed to the Patriotic People's Armed Troops, also a frontal organization of the JVP, these include the attack on the SLAF detachment in Pallekele.

=== In the Northeast ===
In 1989 the organising committee of the JVP ordered Premakumar to attack the IPKF following the second anniversary of signing the Indo-Lanka accord. The attack was planned as a mine attack.

On 25 July 1989, the DJV planted two mines in roads where the cadre knew IPKF infantry troops travel through. Sarath Kule, an explosives expert, planted the mines. Watchers were kept to identify IPKF vehicles. The first mine didn't explode, however, the second successfully exploded, damaging the infantry vehicle. The cadre then rushed into the vehicle and stole an Indian Light Machine Gun. There were Indian troops outside firing at the cadre but none were shot. Fourteen IPKF jawans were killed in the attack.

A statement made later recalling the incident says:

Kumara Gunaratnam's older brother Ranjithan (said to be dead) was one of the most intelligent, able and disciplined cadres I have met anywhere. By comparison, Kumara himself seems to have had more guts than brains, but those guts were in abundance. While the JVP cadre was busily murdering Sinhala leftists and minor state employees in the name of a patriotic war against the IPKF, Kumara was a true believer who actually planned and possibly participated in an ambush of an IPKF unit. The morning after, the JVP leadership contacted the Indian Deputy High Commissioner and profusely apologised, promising never to repeat that.

== Sources ==
- Pfaffenburger, B. "Indian Intervention and Resurgence of the JVP". Asian Survey. 28 (2). University of California press: 137–147. doi:10.2307/2644815. JSTOR 2644815.
- Mainuddin, Rolin (1997). Religion and Self-Determination : A Case Study of Sri Lanka. Manju Jain.
- Gunawardena, A. (2005). "Jayawardene". Encyclopedia of Sri Lanka.
- Johari, J.C. (1991). "The Indo-Sri Lanka Accord of 1987". Governments and Politics of South Asia. Bangladesh: Link Press. ISBN 1873444001.
- Dawoody, Alexander R. Eradicating Terrorism from the Middle East: Policy and Administrative Approaches. Public Administration, Governance and Globalization. Vol. 17. Springer.
- de Silva, K.M.; Jayatileke, T. (1997). Peradeniya. International Centre for Ethnic Studies.
- Benjamin, J. Democratic Process, Foreign Policy and Human Rights in South Asia.
