= Qılıncbəyli =

- Location within Azerbaijan
- Coordinates: 40°49′04″N 46°13′08″E
- Country: Azerbaijan
- Rayon: Shamkir
- Elevation: 243 m (797 ft)

Population
  - Total: 1,277
- Time zone: UTC+4 (AZT)
  - Summer (DST): UTC+5 (AZT)

Qılıncbəyli (known as Pravda until 1998) is a village and municipality in the Shamkir Rayon of Azerbaijan, located at 243 metres above sea level. It has a population of 1,277.
