= History of Sri Lanka Transport Board =

The history of Sri Lanka Transport Board, the state-run, primary bus operator in Sri Lanka, goes back to 1 January 1958. The state-owned enterprise was at the time known as the Ceylon Transport Board. At its peak, it was the largest omnibus company in the world - with about 7,000 buses and over 50,000 employees. With privatization in 1979, it underwent a period of decline. First broken up into several regional boards, then into several companies, it was finally reconstituted as the Sri Lanka Transport Board in 2005.

== Origins ==
The first motor omnibus in Sri Lanka was imported in 1907, and bus transport began in Sri Lanka as an owner-operated service. There was no regulation, so when more than one bus operated on a single route there was a scramble for the load, which might end in fisticuffs or even stabbings. By the mid-1930s, malpractices in pursuit of maximum profit began to compromise safety and comfort. The setting up of the limited liability omnibus companies by the British around 1940 was the first meaningful step in regularising public passenger transport in the country.

Controlling legislation was strengthened in 1951 with the introduction of a system of quantity and quality licensing, similar to what then applied in Great Britain. Nevertheless, conditions again deteriorated.

The earliest buses plied on the main routes only and had open bodies. Passengers got in from both sides of the bus and through a door at the back. The openings were covered with buttoned down leather cloth which could be rolled up when necessary. The Nelson Commission appointed by the British government to look into shortcomings in bus transport in Sri Lanka recommended replacing open body buses with closed body buses, which came to be known as 'Nelson body' buses.

The limited liability omnibus companies that came into existence were the Silverline Bus Company owned by B. J. Fernando, the South Western Bus Company (Sir Cyril de Zoysa), Wijaya Bus Company (Mudaliyar David Mendis of Negombo), the Ebert Silva Bus Company (Ebert Silva), Sri Lanka Omnibus Company (Jayasena Mudalali), Panadura Bus Company (Sir Leo Fernando), K. B. L. Perera and Sons of Hendala, Siri Medura Bus Company (Singho Mahattaya of Attanagalla) and so on.

The owners were in overall charge of operations, and the companies ran the services on their own whims and fancies; the companies shared routes among themselves. It was therefore difficult for the commuters to travel to distant places without breaking journey at one or two destinations. There were no time schedules or night time services. Buses packed to capacity were driven at a terrific speed, even on bends on the steep roads of the Hatton-Adam's Peak route. Only the South Western Bus Company was run on modern lines.

These companies employed the minimum number of staff: support staff was almost non-existent. Unionisation by N. M. Perera's All Ceylon United Motor Workers' Union had to proceed in secret, with union agents disguising themselves to avoid company thugs.

At the time, all the buses ran on petrol (gasoline) or even kerosene (paraffin). Among the makes employed were Bedford, Chevrolet, Dodge, Ford, Leyland and Mercedes-Benz. Only the South Western Bus Company had run double-decker buses, which plied on the Galle Road.

== Ceylon Transport Board ==
=== Beginnings ===
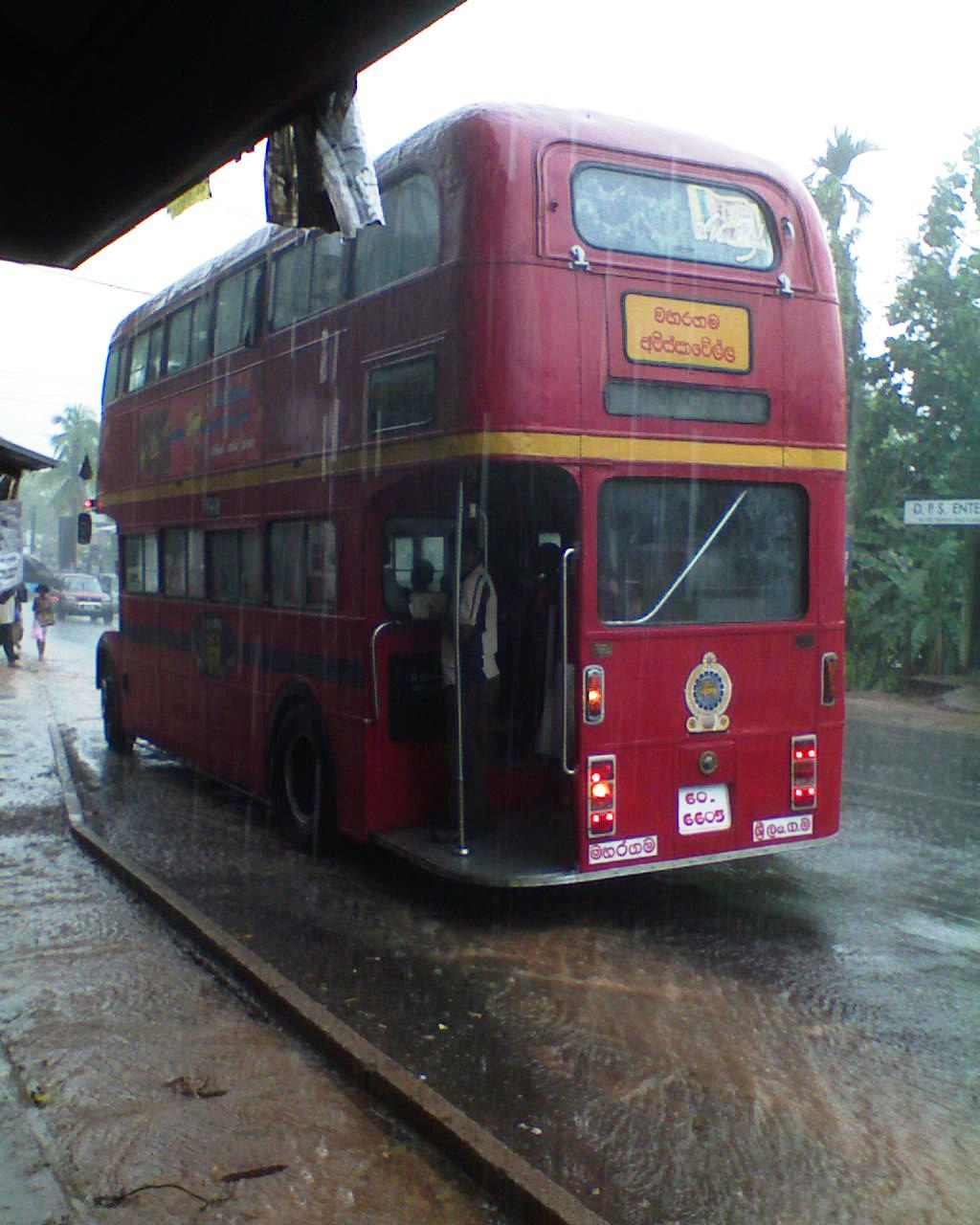
An AEC Routemaster at Godagama junction in Homagama, Sri Lanka

The Ratnam Survey in 1948, the Sansoni Survey in 1954 and the Jayaratna Perera Survey in 1956 studied the bus services in Sri Lanka and all recommended that the companies should be nationalised.

In 1957, the Mahajana Eksath Peramuna government led by Prime Minister SWRD Bandaranaike decided on the nationalisation of bus services. In order to provide a better service to the people, he established the Ceylon Transport Board on 1 January 1958.

The inaugural trip of the CTB took the Prime Minister and the Transport and Works Minister Maithripala Senanayake on a maroon luxury Mercedes-Benz bus imported from Germany. This bus is still owned by the Nittambuwa Bus Depot.

The creation of a single nationalised entity made possible long distance operations and running buses on a large number of rural routes. To supplement the company buses that were vested in the CTB, a record number of buses and bus chassis were imported. Leyland, Wayne, Hino and Magirus Deutz buses and even a Škoda bus with a trailer were imported. Hundreds of ex-London Transport single-decker C & CR Leyland Cubs, TD Leyland Tigers, AEC Regal RFWs and all-diesel double-decker Guy Arab, Daimler, RT (AEC), and RTL & RTW (Leyland) buses arrived in the 1950s and 1960s from London Transport. Steps were taken to convert other buses to diesel fuel.

The CTB was given a good start under the Chairmanship of Vere de Mel of the Ceylon Civil Service (and of Quickshaws, the private taxi company). Thereafter the services deteriorated and the Board ran into financial difficulties owing to mismanagement.

In 1964 Anil Moonesinghe of the Lanka Sama Samaja Party (LSSP) became Minister of Communications, in overall charge of the transport, including the CTB. He took a very close interest in the running of the organisation. He introduced workers' councils on the Yugoslav model to participate in management, with a resultant improvement in morale and efficiency. He expanded the bus services, most notably in Jaffna, where the ex-London Transport double-deckers were very popular and broke the monopoly on public transport by illicit private operators.

Moonesinghe took steps to set up a Central Bus Station (CBS) in the central Colombo district of Pettah, close to the main Fort Railway Station. He started the Central Workshops at Werahera, just outside Colombo, which built bus bodies out of aluminium and carried out engine repairs and overhauls. The fleet strength was continuously increased by the addition of more second-hand London buses. Fiat and OM Tigrotto buses were imported new. The Fiat company also gifted about 30 cars, in lieu of commission. He was in the middle of negotiating with the Fiat company to build buses in Sri Lanka when the government of which he was a minister fell in 1965.

=== Golden age ===
In 1970, the UF United Front government of Sirimavo Bandaranaike was returned to power, with Leslie Goonewardene of the LSSP as Minister of Transport. The CTB workers immediately took matters into their own hands and reconstituted the workers' councils. On their demand, Anil Moonesinghe (now no longer an MP) was brought back as Chairman and General Manager.

Anil Moonesinghe would dress in a bush shirt and trousers and operate as a one-man flying squad to catch errant bus crews in the act, lying in wait in his metallic blue Volkswagen Variant or his Citroën 2CV at places like Dematagoda Junction to prowl on them. Stories would abound (all untrue) of him being spotted disguised with a beard. In order to prove that eight buses could be serviced in a day, he once carried out eight vehicle services at the Central Workshops, Werahera.

==== New management vision ====
Moonesinghe planned a multi-faceted approach to the management of the institution: training and skills enhancement, scientific methodology and discipline were considered to be three main requisite characteristics.

The managerial competency and skill of the CTB staff was upgraded, and several batches of management trainees were recruited to all its major functional areas. A training arm was organised for both the managerial and the lower-level staff. Staff were recruited on projected future needs and not on an ad-hoc basis as hitherto.

Operations were put on a scientific footing. Measurements were introduced to ascertain the efficiency of every sector. Operations were re-structured based on studying commuter demands, and operational bases were expanded by increasing the number of depots to over 100.

Operational discipline was improved by displaying running and route numbers as well as destinations on buses and systematising terminal controls through efficient and effective time-keeping, to enhance the regularity in the operation of the running schedules. Way-side breakdowns were brought down to a bare minimum.

The views of commuters were sought. J. Diandas, a well known commuter representative and rights activist (as well as a specialist in transport) was made an advisor, and consultations with consumer bodies were frequently carried out.

Local Bus Body building

This industry (Bus/Lorry Body building) reached its peak in the mid 1960s to the late 70s and gradually declined after 1977 when the open economic policy of the new government came into play, Then in the mid 1980s the SLTB’s own local bus body building facilities abandoned and Indian imports in complete built form replaced the local manufacture,.

==== Technical improvements ====
A policy of standardisation was inaugurated, to prevent the multiplication of bus types and makes. Bus chassis were purchased from Ashok Leyland and Tata; Isuzu chassis were also obtained (at prices equivalent to the Indian chassis) in order to prevent cartelisation by the Indian suppliers. Some chassis were also imported from Ikarus of Hungary. As an emergency measure, several hundred BMC WF lorry chassis intended for goods transport were taken over by the CTB and converted into buses. Trans Board Tours, intended to hire buses for private trips, was started and a fleet of luxury Leyland Viking buses was acquired for it. These were very comfortable buses painted light brown.

The double-decker buses imported second-hand from London Transport were gradually withdrawn from service due to the high cost of spare parts and heavy diesel consumption compared to the new Indian and Japanese buses. Only a few of these remain, notably one at Maharagama depot, which runs up to Avissawella.

A positive effort was made to build up local industry, and the CTB became well equipped with foundries and workshops: the Central Workshop at Werahera became the largest in South Asia, equipped with machine tools from India, Germany and the Eastern Bloc. In 1974 the assembly of bus chassis and prototypes of a locally manufactured bus and a car rolled out of Werahera. Preference was given to locally manufactured spare parts, and the automotive spare parts industry grew rapidly.

The requirement for skilled intermediate technical staff was also taken in hand. The Ceylon-German Training School, started with aid from the Federal Republic of Germany, became the Sri Lanka-German Technical Training Institute, producing high-grade technicians.

==== Self-management ====
The workers' councils were regularised as 'Employees' Councils', with regular elections supervised by the Elections Commissioner. Dudley Wijesiri, a brilliant young manager, was put in charge of the unit tasked with taking workers' self-management forward. Management was decentralised as much as possible to depot level, where management tasks were shared between the Depot Superintendent (a technical officer) and the Depot Employees' Council. At the same time, discipline was strictly enforced.

The enthusiasm of the employees helped improve the efficiency of the mammoth institution. For example, they pointed out a number of ways by which bus conductors could cheat their ticket machines. A special ticket machine workshop was established at Ethul Kotte to incorporate the modifications suggested by them.

A congress of all the Employees' Councils in the Board was held in 1975. Leslie Gunawardena and Anil Moonesinghe were preparing the next step up the workers' self-management ladder: the Board of Directors was to be reconstituted with half the members to be elected by the Employees' Councils, with the Chairman holding the balance.

==== Results ====
As a consequence of all these, the reliability of operations increased and the commuters could rely on (i) the time tables, (ii) the first and last trips on the routes schedules, (iii) courtesy and promptness of service (iv) cleanliness of buses and premises, (v) courtesy and disciplined conduct of the staff and, most importantly (vi) safe and accident-free operation.

The CTB was now carrying about 4,000,000 passengers per day, with just 5,000 running buses. Therefore, standee buses were introduced, with a conductors at each of the front and rear doors to ensure that no revenue was lost. 'Ladies Only' trips were started to enable women commuters to return home after work. By 1974 the CTB was again running at a profit and proving a good service at the same time.

Work was started on a new CBS in the Pettah, funded by monies generated by the CTB. This was to be a modern transport complex, complete with shops, a low-budget hotel for long-distance travellers and a cinema. Only one section of arc of the outer circular structure was completed by the end of 1975.

Then, in September 1975, the United Front government broke up and Leslie Goonewardene and Anil Moonesinghe resigned.

=== Breakdown ===
Jack Kotelawela was now appointed Chairman. However, his management philosophy differed from that of Anil Moonesinghe. The Employees' Councils continued, but with none of the enthusiasm that characterised them in the earlier years. An adequate service was provided to the commuters, however.

The change of government in 1977 saw the looting of CTB assets in broad daylight. Buses in running condition were condemned as unusable and sold to backers of the ruling United National Party at low prices. Some of them may still be seen on the roads, three decades later.

The new government of J.R. Jayewardene was intent on destroying what was now a popular symbol of efficient state enterprise. By Law No. 19 of 1978, the CTB was broken up into Regional Transport Boards (RTBs). A central co-ordinating body, the Sri Lanka Central Transport Board (SLCTB) was established, but it was not organic with the RTBs.

The partially constructed new CBS building, which had been built with funds generated by the CTB, was handed over to the Urban Development Authority. The Employees' Councils were scrapped. A series of inadequately thought out plans were put into operation, notably the 'Green Circle Line' - scrapped within five years. A large amount of money was spent repainting the buses green. Lumpenproletariat supporters of the UNP were recruited in large numbers to the RTBs, particularly after the 1980 General Strike.

Jayewardene also re-introduced the system that had prevailed in the pre-bus company days, of unregulated private buses. The difference was that operators had to obtain route licences. The road discipline of these operators, many of whom had political backing, was almost non-existent, but commuters, faced with a state transport system now on the verge of collapse, had no option but to travel on them. Most of these private buses are in a pitiable condition today and many are unroadworthy.

Jayawardene's successor, Ranasinghe Premadasa, broke the RTBs down into smaller units based on 93 bus depots, the so-called 'Peoplised Bus Companies'. The Central Workshops, Werahera and the regional workshops established in the 1970s were handed out to private companies in controversial circumstances.

In the 1990s, the lack of success of these enterprises drove the government to group the 93 'Peoplised Bus Companies' into 11 'cluster' companies.

By the 2000s (decade), the 'peoplised' transport services accounted for less than a quarter of the daily load of bus passengers. Scarcely a day passed without a letter in the press complaining about overloading, excessive speeds, dangerous driving, rudeness and overcharging on the private buses. The cluster companies did not suffer as much bad publicity, as they endeavoured to observe regulatory requirements and offered a nationwide, if thinly spread service.

== Sri Lanka Transport Board ==
After Dinesh Gunawardena was made Minister of Transport in 2001, he consulted Anil Moonesinghe (by them Sri Lanka's ambassador to Austria) and others on how the transport services were to be improved. This was followed up with a Bill to set up the CTB once again. The Cabinet of Ministers approved the bill, but the fall of the Government delayed the bill's presentation to Parliament. Finally, in early 2005, the institution was resurrected as the Sri Lanka Transport Board (SLTB).

The move received bipartisan support in Parliament. It was hailed by the Joint Business Forum (J-Biz), which welcomed the revival of the CTB: this was one of the rare occasions on which the business community said a state bus service was better than privatised ventures.

In July 2007, it was announced that steps had been taken to increase the SLTB bus fleet from 4,200 to 5,000 within the year, by importing engines to put sidelined buses into operation. At that time, the private bus fleet of Sri Lanka was 19,000 strong. Sri Lanka's transportation is much better nowadays when comparing to the olden days
