= History of Sri Lanka (1948–present) =

The history of Sri Lanka from 1948 to the present is marked by the independence of the country through to Dominion and becoming a Republic.

== Overview ==
Periodization of Sri Lanka history:

Dates	Period	Period	Span (years)	Subperiod	Span (years)	Main government
300,000 BP	Prehistoric Sri Lanka	Stone Age	300,000		–	Unknown
~1000 BCE–543 BCE	Prehistoric Sri Lanka	Iron Age	457		–	Republic
543 BCE–437 BCE	Ancient Sri Lanka	Pre-Anuradhapura	106		–	Monarchy
437 BCE–463 CE	Ancient Sri Lanka	Anuradhapura	1454	Early Anuradhapura	900	Monarchy
463–691	Ancient Sri Lanka	Anuradhapura	1454	Middle Anuradhapura	228	Monarchy
691–1017	Post-classical Sri Lanka	Anuradhapura	1454	Late Anuradhapura	326	Monarchy
1017–1070	Post-classical Sri Lanka	Polonnaruwa	215	Chola conquest	53	Monarchy
1055–1196	Post-classical Sri Lanka	Polonnaruwa	215	High Polonnaruwa	141	Monarchy
1196–1232	Post-classical Sri Lanka	Polonnaruwa	215	Late Polonnaruwa	36	Monarchy
1232–1341	Post-classical Sri Lanka	Transitional	365	Dambadeniya	109	Monarchy
1341–1412	Post-classical Sri Lanka	Transitional	365	Gampola	71	Monarchy
1412–1592	Early Modern Sri Lanka	Transitional	365	Kotte	180	Monarchy
1592–1707	Early Modern Sri Lanka	Kandyan	223	Early Kandyan	115	Monarchy
1707–1760	Early Modern Sri Lanka	Kandyan	223	Middle Kandyan	53	Monarchy
1760–1815	Early Modern Sri Lanka	Kandyan	223	Late Kandyan	55	Monarchy
1815–1833	Modern Sri Lanka	British Ceylon	133	Post-Kandyan	18	Colonial monarchy
1833–1927	Modern Sri Lanka	British Ceylon	133	Colebrooke–Cameron Reforms era	94	Colonial monarchy
1927–1948	Modern Sri Lanka	British Ceylon	133	Donoughmore Reforms era	21	Colonial monarchy
1948–1972	Contemporary Sri Lanka	Sri Lanka since 1948	78	Dominion	24	Constitutional monarchy
1972–present	Contemporary Sri Lanka	Sri Lanka since 1948	78	Republic	54	Unitary semi-presidential constitutional republic

== Political history ==
=== Independence and decolonisation (1948–1956) ===
Ceylon gained Dominion status on 4 February 1948, with military treaties with Britain (as the upper ranks of the armed forces were initially British) and British air and sea bases remained intact. This was later raised to independence itself, and D. S. Senanayake became the first Prime Minister of Sri Lanka. In 1949, with the concurrence of the leaders of the Ceylon Tamils, Senanayake's United National Party (UNP) government disenfranchised Indian Tamil plantation workers in the country. This was the price that Senanayake had to pay to obtain the support of the Kandyan Sinhalese, who felt threatened by the demographics of the tea estates where the inclusion of the "Indian Tamils" would have meant electoral defeat for the Kandyan leaders.

Senanayake died in 1952 after falling from a horse and was succeeded by his son Dudley Senanayake, the then Minister of Agriculture. In 1953 he resigned following a massive Hartal ("general strike") against his government by numerous leftist parties. He was succeeded by his cousin John Kotelawala. Kotelawala did not have the enormous personal prestige or the adroit political acumen of D. S. Senanayake. He brought to the fore the issue of national languages that D. S. Senanayake had adroitly kept on the back burner, antagonising the Tamils and the Sinhalese by stating conflicting policies with regard to the status of Sinhala and Tamil as official languages. He also antagonized the Buddhist lobby by attacking politically active Buddhist monks who were supporters of opposition leader S. W. R. D. Bandaranaike.

=== Socialist experiment (1956–1977) ===
The 1956 parliamentary election resulted in a shift of power from the United National Party to a coalition led by the Sri Lanka Freedom Party (SLFP, founded by Bandaranaike in 1951), and Bandaranaike was elected prime minister. Under his government, Sinhala was established as the official language, with Tamil as a second language. Appeals to the Judicial Committee of the Privy Council in London were abolished and plantations were nationalised to fulfil the election pledges of the Marxist program and to "prevent the ongoing dis-investment by the owning companies".

In 1956, the Sinhala Only Act came into being. This established Sinhala as the first and preferred language in commerce and education. The act took effect immediately. As a consequence vast numbers of people mostly Burghers left the country to live abroad as they felt discriminated against.

In 1958, the first major riots between Sinhalese and Tamils flared up in Colombo as a direct result of the government's language policy.

1971 Uprising

The Marxist–Leninist Sinhalese nationalist Janatha Vimukthi Peramuna drew worldwide attention when it launched an insurrection against the government of Sirimavo Bandaranaike in April 1971. Although the insurgents were young, poorly armed, and inadequately trained, they succeeded in seizing and holding major areas in the Southern and Central Provinces before they were defeated by the security forces. Their attempt to seize power created a major crisis for the government and forced a fundamental reassessment of the nation's security needs.

The movement was started in the late 1960s by Rohana Wijeweera, the son of a businessman from the seaport of Tangalla, Hambantota District. An excellent student, Wijeweera had been forced to give up his studies for financial reasons. Through friends of his father, a member of the Ceylon Communist Party, Wijeweera successfully applied for a scholarship in the Soviet Union, and in 1960 at the age of seventeen, he went to Moscow to study medicine at Patrice Lumumba University.

While in Moscow, he studied Marxist ideology but, because of his openly expressed sympathies for Maoist revolutionary theory, he was denied a visa to return to the Soviet Union after a brief trip home in 1964. Over the next several years, he participated in the pro-Beijing branch of the Ceylon Communist Party, but he was increasingly at odds with party leaders and impatient with its lack of revolutionary purpose. His success in working with youth groups and his popularity as a public speaker led him to organize his own movement in 1967. Initially identified simply as the New Left, this group drew on students and unemployed youths from rural areas, most of them in the sixteen-to-twenty-five-age-group. Many of these new recruits were members of minority so-called 'lower' castes (Karava and Durava) who felt that their economic interests had been neglected by the nation's leftist coalitions. The standard program of indoctrination, the so-called Five Lectures, included discussions of Indian imperialism, the growing economic crisis, the failure of the island's communist and socialist parties, and the need for a sudden, violent seizure of power.

Between 1967 and 1970, the group expanded rapidly, gaining control of the student socialist movement at a number of major university campuses and winning recruits and sympathizers within the armed forces. Some of these latter supporters actually provided sketches of police stations, airports, and military facilities that were important to the initial success of the revolt. In order to draw the newer members more tightly into the organization and to prepare them for a coming confrontation, Wijeweera opened "education camps" in several remote areas along the south and southwestern coasts. These camps provided training in Marxism–Leninism and in basic military skills.

While developing secret cells and regional commands, Wijeweera's group also began to take a more public role during the elections of 1970. His cadres campaigned openly for the United Front of Sirimavo R. D. Bandaranaike, but at the same time, they distributed posters and pamphlets promising violent rebellion if Bandaranaike did not address the interests of the proletariat. In a manifesto issued during this period, the group used the name Janatha Vimukthi Peramuna for the first time. Because of the subversive tone of these publications, the United National Party government had Wijeweera detained during the elections, but the victorious Bandaranaike ordered his release in July 1970. In the politically tolerant atmosphere of the next few months, as the new government attempted to win over a wide variety of unorthodox leftist groups, the JVP intensified both the public campaign and the private preparations for a revolt. Although their group was relatively small, the members hoped to immobilize the government by selective kidnapping and sudden, simultaneous strikes against the security forces throughout the island. Some of the necessary weapons had been bought with funds supplied by the members. For the most part, however, they relied on raids against police stations and army camps to secure weapons, and they manufactured their own bombs.

The discovery of several JVP bomb factories gave the government its first evidence that the group's public threats were to be taken seriously. In March 1971, after an accidental explosion in one of these factories, the police found fifty-eight bombs in a hut in Nelundeniya, Kegalla District. Shortly afterwards, Wijeweera was arrested and sent to Jaffna Prison, where he remained throughout the revolt. In response to his arrest and the growing pressure of police investigations, other JVP leaders decided to act immediately, and they agreed to begin the uprising at 11:00 P.M. on 5 April.

The planning for the countrywide insurrection was hasty and poorly coordinated; some of the district leaders were not informed until the morning of the uprising. After one premature attack, security forces throughout the island were put on alert and a number of JVP leaders went into hiding without bothering to inform their subordinates of the changed circumstances. In spite of this confusion, rebel groups armed with shotguns, bombs, and Molotov cocktails launched simultaneous attacks against seventy-four police stations around the island and cut power to major urban areas. The attacks were most successful in the south. By 10 April, the rebels had taken control of Matara District and the city of Ambalangoda in Galle District and came close to capturing the remaining areas of Southern Province.

The new government was ill-prepared for the crisis that confronted it. Although there had been some warning that an attack was imminent, Bandaranaike was caught off guard by the scale of the uprising and was forced to call on India to provide basic security functions. Indian frigates patrolled the coast and Indian troops guarded Bandaranaike International Airport at Katunayaka while Indian Air Force helicopters assisted the counteroffensive. Sri Lanka's all-volunteer army had no combat experience since World War II and no training in counterinsurgency warfare. Although the police were able to defend some areas unassisted, in many places the government deployed personnel from all three services in a ground force capacity. Royal Ceylon Air Force helicopters delivered relief supplies to beleaguered police stations while combined service patrols drove the insurgents out of urban areas and into the countryside.

After two weeks of fighting, the government regained control of all but a few remote areas. In both human and political terms, the cost of the victory was high: an estimated 10,000 insurgents- -many of them in their teens—died in the conflict, and the army was widely perceived to have used excessive force. In order to win over an alienated population and to prevent a prolonged conflict, Bandaranaike offered amnesties in May and June 1971, and only the top leaders were actually imprisoned. Wijeweera, who was already in detention at the time of the uprising, was given a twenty-year sentence and the JVP was proscribed.

Under the six years of emergency rule that followed the uprising, the JVP remained dormant. After the victory of the United National Party in the 1977 elections, however, the new government attempted to broaden its mandate with a period of political tolerance. Wijeweera was freed, the ban was lifted, and the JVP entered the arena of legal political competition. As a candidate in the 1982 presidential elections, Wijeweera finished fourth, with more than 250,000 votes (as compared with Jayewardene's 3.2 million). During this period, and especially as the Tamil conflict to the north became more intense, there was a marked shift in the ideology and goals of the JVP. Initially Marxist in orientation, and claiming to represent the oppressed of both the Tamil and Sinhalese communities, the group emerged increasingly as a Sinhalese nationalist organization opposing any compromise with the Tamil insurgency. This new orientation became explicit in the anti-Tamil riots of July 1983. Because of its role in inciting violence, the JVP was once again banned and its leadership went underground.

The group's activities intensified in the second half of 1987 in the wake of the Indo-Sri Lankan Accord. The prospect of Tamil autonomy in the north together with the presence of Indian troops stirred up a wave of Sinhalese nationalism and sudden growth of anti-government violence. During 1987 a new group emerged that was an offshoot of the JVP—the Patriotic Liberation Organization (Deshapremi Janatha Viyaparaya—DJV). The DJV claimed responsibility for the August 1987 assassination attempts against the president and prime minister. In addition, the group launched a campaign of intimidation against the ruling party, killing more than seventy members of Parliament between July and November.

Along with the group's renewed violence came a renewed fear of infiltration of the armed forces. Following the successful raid of the Pallekelle army camp in May 1987, the government conducted an investigation that resulted in the discharge of thirty-seven soldiers suspected of having links with the JVP. In order to prevent a repetition of the 1971 uprising, the government considered lifting the ban on the JVP in early 1988 and permitting the group to participate again in the political arena. With Wijeweera still underground, however, the JVP had no clear leadership at the time, and it was uncertain whether it had the cohesion to mount any coordinated offensive, either military or political, against the government.

=== Free market economy (1977–1994) ===
Under Bandaranaike, the country became a republic, the Free Sovereign and Independent Republic of Sri Lanka, the Senate was abolished and Sinhala was established as the official language (with Tamil as a second language). Full independence came as the last remaining constitutional ties with the United Kingdom were broken (e.g., the right of appeal to the United Kingdom's Judicial Committee of the Privy Council ceased, thus establishing the Supreme Court as the country's ultimate court of appeal). Colonial plantations were nationalised to fulfil the election pledges of the Marxist program and to "prevent the ongoing dis-investment by the owning companies".

The Republic of Sri Lanka is established on 22 May 1972. By 1977, the voters were tired of Bandaranaike's socialist policies and elections returned the UNP to power under Junius Jayewardene, on a manifesto pledging a market economy and "a free ration of 8 seers (kilograms) of cereals". The SLFP and the left-wing parties were virtually wiped out in Parliament, although they garnered 40% of the popular vote, leaving the Tamil United Liberation Front led by A. Amirthalingam as the official opposition. This created a dangerous ethnic division in Sri Lankan politics.

After coming to power, Jayewardene directed the rewriting of the constitution. The document that was produced, the new Constitution of 1978, drastically altered the nature of governance in Sri Lanka. It replaced the previous Westminster style, parliamentary government with a new presidential system modelled after France, with a powerful chief executive. The president was to be elected by direct suffrage for a six-year term and was empowered to appoint, with parliamentary approval, the prime minister and to preside over cabinet meetings. Jayewardene became the first president under the new Constitution and assumed direct control of the government machinery and party.

The new regime ushered in an era that did not augur well for the SLFP. Jayewardene's UNP government accused former prime minister Bandaranaike of abusing her power while in office from 1970 to 1977. In October 1980, Bandaranaike's privilege to engage in politics was removed for a period of seven years, and the SLFP was forced to seek a new leader. After a long and divisive battle, the party chose her son, Anura. Anura Bandaranaike was soon thrust into the role of the keeper of his father's legacy, but he inherited a political party torn apart by factionalism and reduced to a minimal role in the Parliament.

The 1978 Constitution included substantial concessions to Tamil sensitivities. Although TULF did not participate in framing the Constitution, it continued to sit in Parliament in the hope of negotiating a settlement to the Tamil problem. TULF also agreed to Jayewardene's proposal of an all-party conference to resolve the island's ethnic problems. Jayewardene's UNP offered other concessions in a bid to secure peace. Sinhala remained the official language and the language of administration throughout Sri Lanka, but Tamil was given a new "national language" status. Tamil was to be used in a number of administrative and educational circumstances. Jayewardene also eliminated a major Tamil grievance by abrogating the "standardization" policy of the United Front government, which had made university admission criteria for Tamils more difficult. In addition, he offered many top-level positions, including that of minister of justice, to Tamil civil servants.

While TULF, in conjunction with the UNP, pressed for the all-party conference, the Tamil Tigers escalated their terrorist attacks, which provoked Sinhalese backlash against Tamils and generally precluded any successful accommodation. In reaction to the assassination of a Jaffna police inspector, the Jayewardene government declared an emergency and dispatched troops, who were given an unrealistic six months to eradicate the terrorist threat.

The government passed the Prevention of Terrorism (Temporary Provisions) Act in 1979. The act was enacted as a temporary measure, but it later became permanent legislation. The International Commission of Jurists, Amnesty International, and other human rights organizations condemned the act as being incompatible with democratic traditions. Despite the act, the number of terrorist acts increased. Guerrillas began to hit targets of high symbolic value such as post offices and police outposts, provoking government counterattacks. As an increasing number of civilians were caught in the fighting, Tamil support widened for the "boys", as the guerrillas began to be called. Other large, well-armed groups began to compete with LTTE. The better-known included the People's Liberation Organization of Tamil Eelam, Tamil Eelam Liberation Army, and the Tamil Eelam Liberation Organization. Each of these groups had forces measured in the hundreds if not thousands. The government claimed that many of the terrorists were operating from training camps in India's Tamil Nadu State. The Indian government repeatedly denied this claim. With the level of violence mounting, the possibility of negotiation became increasingly distant.

An attempt was made at economic independence, with a five-year plan to achieve industrial development. However, this was stymied by a shortage of foreign exchange, a very expensive welfare program, and the oil crisis of 1974. These, combined with an unprecedented drought severely affected the harvest of rice, the staple food of the people. Strides were made in the fields of heavy industry, automotive parts and electronics. The strongly centralized economy, functioning via a set of state corporations, grew very sluggishly.

In 1971, a group variously labelled Maoist or Guevarist, the People's Liberation Front (JVP) launched a rebellion. It was led by Rohana Wijeweera, a Marxist who had his education at the Lumumba University in the Soviet Union. This movement was not connected with the traditional Sri Lankan Marxist parties which were then in power. Most of the "insurgents" were unemployed literate youth who were the product of the post-independence population explosion. Although the JVP rebellion was brutally suppressed, the JVP found a place in Sri Lankan politics as a voice of leftist Sinhalese nationalism, along with the right-wing movement in the UNP associated with Cyril Matthew. Militant Tamil Chauvinist movements, e.g., the Pulippadai (tiger army), had been launched in Trincomalee in 1965. The Jaffna university was "ethnically cleansed" of non-Tamils in 1976, and the city itself began to be subject to similar "ethnic cleansing", eliminating Muslim and Sinhala residents.

The extreme-Tamil groups rejected and physically eliminated the main Colombo-Tamil leadership of the Tamil United Liberation Front (TULF). Tamil public servants or members of parliament working with the government were harassed. The mayor of Jaffna was assassinated in 1975. The militants claimed their independence, their rights, and their "traditional homeland", and formed armed separatist groups such as the Liberation Tigers of Tamil Eelam ('Tamil Tigers'), demanding an independent Tamil state called Eelam. Much of this had the implicit and material support of politicians in India.

==== New constitution ====
By 1977, the voters were tired of Bandaranaike's socialist policies and elections returned the UNP to power under Junius Jayewardene on a manifesto pledging a market economy and "a free ration of 8 seers (kilograms) of cereals". The SLFP and the left-wing parties were virtually wiped out in Parliament (although they garnered 40% of the popular vote), leaving the Tamil United Liberation Front, led by Appapillai Amirthalingam, as the official opposition. This created a dangerous ethnic cleavage in Sri Lankan politics.

Bandaranaike had her civic rights removed by an act of Parliament. In 1978 Jayewardene introduced a new constitution making Sri Lanka a presidential 'Democratic Socialist' republic, with himself as executive President The Constitution of Sri Lanka: Chapter I – The People, the State and Sovereignty. In 1980 he crushed a general strike by the trade-union movement, jailing its leaders. When the UNP member for the parliamentary constituency of Kalawana was removed on an election petition by his Communist opponent, Jayawardene allowed him to continue sitting in the house Priyani179.

In 1977, Colombo abandoned state-controlled economic policies and its import substitution trade policy for market-oriented policies and export-oriented trade. This included the opening of free-trade zones with a heavy emphasis on exports of garments from these zones.

Elections to District Councils in 1981 were marred by the open theft of ballot boxes in Jaffna. The Jaffna Library, the repository of thousands of valuable documents was burned down by thugs alleged to be linked with the government.

President Jayawardene had the constitution amended (one of 13 amendments during his 10 years in office) to allow presidential elections to be held early, in 1982. The main opposition candidate, Hector Kobbekaduwa was garlanded with onions by the farmers of the Jaffna peninsular, impoverished by the policy of unrestricted imports.

The Presidential election held amidst widespread acts of electoral malpractice (Hector Kobbekaduwa arrived at the polling station only to find his vote had already been cast) resulted in Jayawardene's re-election. He followed this with an infamous plebiscite on postponing parliamentary elections for six years. Associates of Kobbekaduwa, such as TB Ilangaratne and Vijaya Kumaratunga, were jailed as 'Naxalites', a political creed unheard of in Sri Lanka, before or since. The Commissioner of Elections, in his report on the referendum, reported that it was flawed.

In 1983, following a demonstration against the US establishment of a military base in Diego Garcia, former MP Vivienne Goonewardena was physically assaulted at a police station. Her fundamental rights application in this matter was upheld by the Supreme Court in an act of judicial independence Priyani179. Following this, thugs stoned the houses of the Supreme Court judges who had made the ruling and the police officer who had been convicted had his fine paid by the government and received a promotion.

==== Civil war (1983-2009) ====
In July 1983, communal riots(also called the pogroms) took place due to the ambush and killing of 13 Sri Lankan Army soldiers by the Tamil Tigers. Using the voters' list which contained the exact addresses of Tamils, the Tamil community faced a backlash from Sinhalese rioters including the destruction of shops, homes, savage beatings and merciless killings by Sinhalese youths. However, quite a few Sinhalese kept Tamil neighbours in their homes to protect them from the rioters. During these riots, the government did nothing to control the mob. Conservative government estimates put the death toll at 400 while the real death toll is believed to be around 3000. In the capital of Sri Lanka, Colombo, almost 100,000 Tamils were displaced. Also around 18,000 Tamil homes and 5,000 homes were destroyed, with 150,000 leaving the country resulting in a Tamil Diaspora in Canada, the UK, Australia and other western countries.

Jayewardene held office until 1989, ruling as a virtual dictator under emergency powers. In 1987, following an army offensive in the Vadamarachchi peninsular, India started getting deeply involved in the ethnic conflict. A convoy sent by India was stopped in Sri Lankan waters by the Sri Lankan Navy and the Indian Air Force retaliated with an airdrop of supplies onto the Jaffna peninsula. While the UNP organised street protests against India, Jayawardene declared that he would defend the country's independence to the last bullet.

However, the airdrop also caused Jayawardene to reconsider his position and he then accepted the offer of Indian Prime Minister Rajiv Gandhi of a Peace Accord Rajiv Gandhi's offer to send troops into Sri Lanka was deeply unpopular with the Sinhalese and, although initially popular with the Tamils, led to an outbreak of hostilities between the Tamil Tigers and the Indian Peace Keeping Force (IPKF) – Eelam War II.

In 1989, Jayewardene was succeeded by his own choice as president, Ranasinghe Premadasa, who asked for the Indian troops to be withdrawn – which was later done by Indian Prime Minister V.P. Singh. Premadasa was assassinated by a Tamil Tiger suicide bomber in 1993. Rajiv Gandhi had already met a similar fate (assassinated by a Tamil Tiger ) in 1991.

=== Attempts at peace and resurgence of war (1994–2009) ===
Premadasa was succeeded by Dingiri Banda Wijetunga, with Ranil Wickremasinghe as Prime Minister. In August 1994, the People's Alliance under Bandaranaike's daughter Chandrika Kumaratunga won legislative elections on a platform of concessions to the Tamils and a 'balanced economy'. Kumaratunga became Prime Minister and in November she was elected president, appointing her 78-year-old (but still active) mother Prime Minister. A ceasefire ensued, which broke down by the Tamil tigers after several months – the beginning of Eelam War III. Under the Bandaranaikes the war dragged on, with the military unable to defeat the separatists and the government opposed to negotiations. By 2000, an estimated 65,000 people had been killed in the conflict.

At Presidential elections in 1999, former Prime Minister Wickremesinghe of the UNP contested on a platform of no concessions to the Tamils but was defeated by Kumaratunga. A 180-degree turn in UNP policy occurred and in December 2001 the UNP returned to office on a policy of a negotiated settlement with the Tigers, with Wickremasinghe as Prime Minister. A ceasefire began, the first long cessation of hostilities since the beginning of the conflict. But the 1978 constitution left the Prime Minister with little power against a hostile President. In March 2004 she dismissed Wickremesinghe and called fresh elections, which returned the SLFP to office under Mahinda Rajapakse.

By 2005, there had been no further progress towards either a military or political solution. The assassination of Foreign Minister Lakshman Kadirgamar in August 2005, by the LTTE (although they denied responsibility), further hardened attitudes. His successor was Anura Bandaranaike, the President's brother and putative political heir. Twenty years of civil conflict had done immense damage to Sri Lankan society and the economy, which has fallen behind other Asian economies, although it remains the second most prosperous nation in South Asia.

In elections held on 17 November 2005 Mahinda Rajapakse was elected president after defeating Ranil Wickremasinghe by a mere 180,000 votes. He appointed Ratnasiri Wickremanayake Prime Minister and Mangala Samaraweera Foreign Minister. Negotiations with the LTTE stalled and low-intensity conflict began. The violence dipped off after talks in February but escalated in April and the conflict continued until the military defeat of the LTTE in May 2009.

Defeat of the LTTE

The Sri Lankan government declared total victory on Monday, 18 May 2009. On 19 May 2009, the Sri Lankan military effectively concluded its 26-year operation against the LTTE. Its military forces recaptured all remaining LTTE controlled territories in the Northern Province, including notably Killinochchi (2 January), the Elephant Pass (9 January) and ultimately the entire district of Mullaitivu.

The 58 Division of the Sri Lankan Army led by Brig. Shavendra Silva, 59 Division led by Brig. Prasanna de Silva and the 53 Division commanded by Gen. Kamal Gunaratne, after having boxed in the remaining LTTE cadres into a small area of territory near Nandhikkadal lagoon, linked up and eliminated the remaining cadres. This final battle claimed the lives of several top LTTE leaders and Velupillai Prabhakaran who was reported to have attempted to flee. On the morning of the 19th, soldiers of the 4th Vijayabahu infantry regiment led by Lt. Col Rohitha Aluvihare claimed to have found the body of Prabhakaran, and so militarily ending a separatist war that had defined Sri Lanka's history for three decades.

On 22 May 2009, Sri Lankan Defence Secretary Gotabhaya Rajapaksa confirmed that 6,261 personnel of the Sri Lankan Armed Forces had lost their lives and 29,551 were wounded during Eelam War IV since July 2006. Brig. Udaya Nanayakkara added that approximately 22,000 LTTE cadres had died during this time. Later the LTTE admitted Prabhakaran's death and accepted defeat.

During this final phase of the conflict, many non-governmental organizations expressed serious concerns about the ultra-aggressive government and LTTE tactics. Many claims have been made of the gross negligence of human rights at the internment camps for refugees. During the conflict, makeshift hospitals and refugee areas were shelled and destroyed although it was not entirely clear who was responsible for the shelling.

UN officials and Media representatives from other countries were sent to undertake investigations into the conflict.

The Times newspaper of the UK accused the government of a massacre on the coastline of a refugee camp caught between the fire. This raised the estimate of deaths to 20, 000, many times that of the official figures released by the government. Furthermore, it was uncovered that the Sri Lankan Government was receiving arms and munitions as well as several fighter planes from the Chinese government in exchange for a Chinese naval base to be built on the Sri Lankan coast. This is a move by Beijing to cement a stronger position in the geopolitical struggle for power over the energy trade routes along the Indian Ocean.

=== Political and economic instability (2009–2024) ===
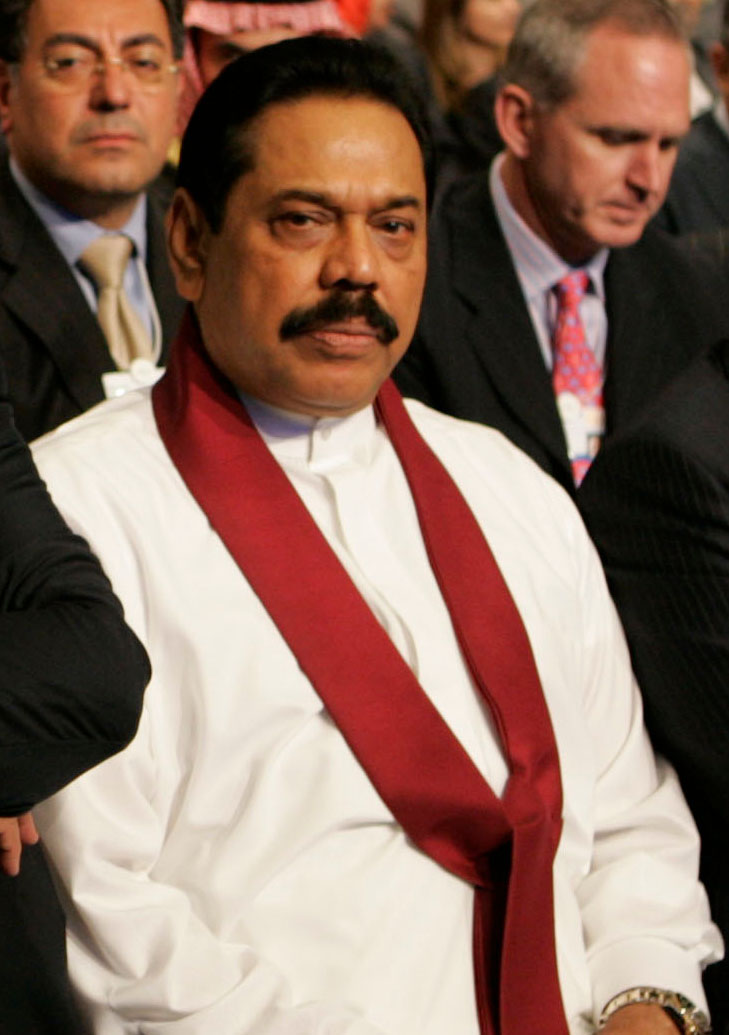
Former president Mahinda Rajapaksa

Sri Lankan government declaration of total victory on 16 May 2009 marked the end of the 26-year-long civil war. President Mahinda Rajapaksa, while attending the G11 summit in Jordan, addressed the summit stating "my government, with the total commitment of our armed forces, has in an unprecedented humanitarian operation finally defeated the LTTE militarily". However the fighting continued for a couple of days thereafter. On the same day, Sri Lankan troops killed 70 rebels attempting to escape by boat, as the last LTTE strongpoints crumbled. The whereabouts of LTTE leader Vellupillai Prabhakaran and other major rebel leaders were not certain at the time. On 17 May 2009, Selvarasa Pathmanathan, the LTTE chief of international relations, admitted the organization's defeat stating "This battle has reached its bitter end ... We have decided to silence our guns. Our only regrets are for the lives lost and that we could not hold out for longer".

On May 18, 2009, Velupillai Prabhakaran was erroneously claimed to be killed by the Sri Lankan armed forces. It was claimed that on the morning of that day, he was killed by gunfire while trying to escape the conflict zone in an ambulance with his closest aides. State television announced that the military had surrounded Prabhakaran in a tiny patch of jungle in the north-east. The Daily Telegraph wrote that, according to Sri Lankan TV, Prabhakaran was "... killed in a rocket-propelled grenade attack as he tried to escape the war zone in an Ambulance. Colonel Soosai, the leader of his "Sea Tigers" navy, and Pottu Amman, his intelligence chief were also killed in the attack."

19 May 2009 saw President Mahinda Rajapaksa giving a victory speech to the Parliament and declared that Sri Lanka is liberated from terrorism. Around 9:30 a.m., the same day, troops attached to Task Force VIII of Sri Lanka Army, reported to its commander, Colonel G.V. Ravipriya that a body similar to Velupillai Prabhakaran has been found among the mangroves in Nandikadal lagoon.

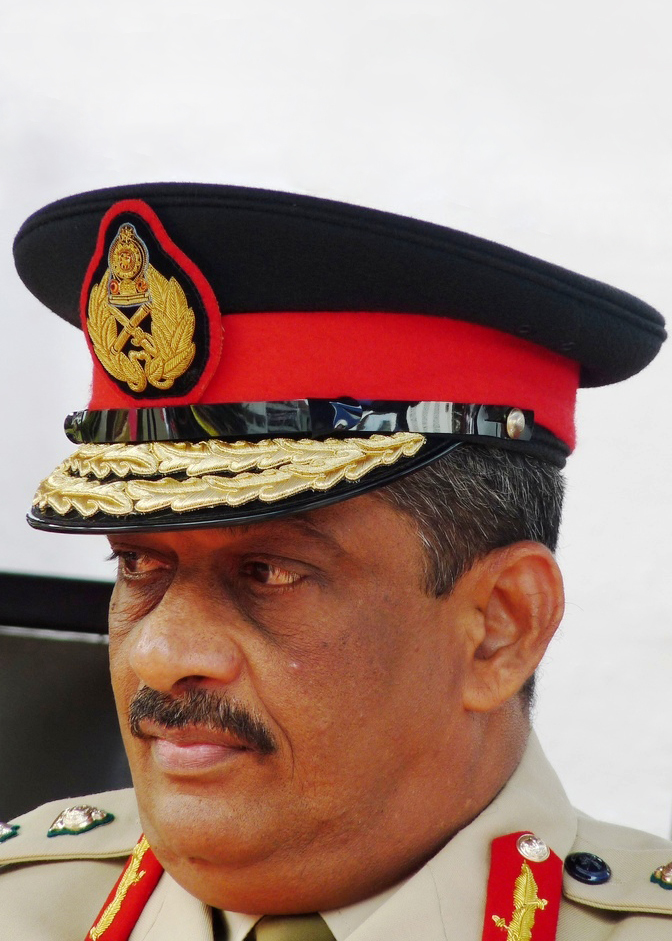
Former Commander of the Army Sarath Fonseka

Sarath Fonseka officially announced Prabhakaran's death on the State television ITN. Later, his body was shown on Swarnavahini for the first time, while the identity was confirmed by Karuna Amman, his former confidant. DNA tests against his son, who had been killed earlier by the Sri Lanka Military, also confirmed the death. Prabakaran's identity was However, contradicting the government claims, Selvarasa Pathmanathan on the same day claimed that "Our beloved leader is alive and safe." But finally on the 24 May 2009, he admitted the death of Prabhakaran, retracting the previous statement. The Sri Lankan military effectively concluded its 26-year operation against the LTTE, its military forces recaptured all remaining LTTE controlled territories in the Northern Province.

On 22 May 2009, Sri Lankan Defence Secretary Gotabhaya Rajapaksa confirmed that 6,261 personnel of the Sri Lankan Armed Forces had died and 29,551 were wounded during the Eelam War IV since July 2006. Brigadier Udaya Nanayakkara added that approximately 22,000 LTTE fighters had died during this time. The war caused the death of 80 000–100 000 civilians. There are allegations that war crimes were committed by the Sri Lankan military and the rebel Liberation Tigers of Tamil Eelam (Tamil Tigers) during the Sri Lankan Civil War, particularly during the final months of the Eelam War IV phase in 2009. The alleged war crimes include attacks on civilians and civilian buildings by both sides; executions of combatants and prisoners by both sides; enforced disappearances by the Sri Lankan military and paramilitary groups backed by them; acute shortages of food, medicine, and clean water for civilians trapped in the war zone; and child recruitment by the Tamil Tigers.

The Sri Lankan civil war cost the lives of an estimated 80,000–100,000 people. This included more than 23,327 Sri Lankan soldiers and policemen, 1,155 Indian soldiers and 27,639 Tamil fighters. The numbers were confirmed by the Secretary of Defence Ministry Gotabhaya Rajapaksa in an interview with state television on 22 May 2009. 23,790 Sri Lankan military personnel were killed since 1981 (it was not specified if police or other non-armed forces personnel were included in this particular figure). From the August 2006 recapture of the Mavil Aru reservoir until the formal declaration of the cessation of hostilities (on May 18), 6261 Sri Lankan soldiers were killed and 29,551 were wounded. The Sri Lankan military estimates that up to 22,000 LTTE militants were killed in the last three years of the conflict. While Gotabhaya Rajapaksa confirmed that 6,261 personnel of the Sri Lankan Armed Forces had died and 29,551 were wounded during the Eelam War IV since July 2006. Brigadier Udaya Nanayakkara added that approximately 22,000 LTTE fighters had died during this time.

Following the LTTE's defeat, Tamil National Alliance, the largest political party in Sri Lanka dropped its demand for a separate state, in favour of a federal solution. Sri Lanka, emerging after a 26-year war, became one of the fastest growing economies of the world.

Presidential elections were completed in January 2010. Mahinda Rajapaksa won the elections with 59% of the votes, defeating General Sarath Fonseka who was the united opposition candidate. Fonseka was subsequently arrested and convicted by court martial.

Under Mahinda Rajapaksa large infrastructure projects and Mega projects such as the Magampura Mahinda Rajapaksa Port were carried out. Large hydro power projects as well as coal powered power plants like the Sampur and Norocholai Power Stations and Sustainable power stations such as the Hambantota Solar Power Station were also built to supply the rising need for power in the country. By 2010 Sri Lanka's poverty rate was 8.9% while it was 15.2% in 2006. Sri Lanka also made it into the "high" category of the Human Development Index during this time.

However, the government came under fierce criticism for corruption and Sri Lanka ranked 79 among 174 countries in the Transparency International corruption index.

Several International bodies including UNROW Human Rights Impact Litigation Clinic, Human Rights Watch and Permanent People's Tribunal have raised allegations on the Sri Lankan Government for genocide against Tamils. On December 10, 2013, Permanent People's Tribunal unanimously ruled Sri Lanka guilty of the crime of genocide against the Tamil people.

==== National government ====
In November 2014, Mahinda Rajapksa called for early elections as signs of declining public support started to appear. Taking the chance the General Secretary of the ruling Sri Lanka Freedom Party and Health minister Maithripala Sirisena defected and said he would contest President Mahinda Rajapaksa at the upcoming presidential election. He was backed by the former president Chandrika Kumaratunga, UNP and its leader Ranil Wickremesinghe, Jathika Hela Urumaya as well as Sarath Fonseka. In his speech, he promised to end Thuggery, embezzlement, crime, drug mafia, nepotism and corruption. The largest Muslim party of Sri Lanka also left the government and joined Maithripala

In January 2015 presidential elections, Mahinda Rajapaksa was defeated by the common candidate of opposition, Maithripala Sirisena, with 51.28% of the votes. Maithripala Sirisena took oath as president. He removed politically appointed officials such as the Chief of Justice Mohan Peiris and launched a major anti-corruption campaign Rajapaksa's attempted return was thwarted in the parliamentary election the same year by Ranil Wickremesinghe This resulted in a unity government between the UNP and SLFP

During Sri Lanka's 68th national independence day celebrations on 4 February 2016, the Tamil version of the Sri Lankan national anthem, "Sri Lanka Matha", was sung at an official government event for the first time since 1949. The lifting of the unofficial ban on the Tamil version had been approved by President Maithripala Sirisena, who had said he would unite the nation after the nearly 26-year civil war which ended in 2009, and by others in the government. This step was viewed as part of the plan for reconciliation. Other steps had also been taken to mend ethnic divisions between the Sinhalese majority and the Tamil minority, according to an article published by National Geographic in November 2016. Some groups, including former President Mahinda Rajapaksa, heavily opposed the government's decision to allow the Tamil version to be sung.

On 21 April 2019, several deadly bombings occurred at three churches and three hotels in several cities across Sri Lanka. Later, two smaller explosions occurred at a housing complex and a motel, killing mainly police officers who had been investigating the situation and raiding suspect locations. At least 269 people were killed, including 45 foreign nationals, and over 500 were injured in the bombings. The church bombings were carried out during Easter masses in Negombo, Batticaloa and Colombo; the hotels bombed included the Shangri-La, Cinnamon Grand and Kingsbury hotels in Colombo. The Islamic State claimed responsibility for the attack, however the main group responsible for the bombings were the National Thowheeth Jama'ath, a Sri Lankan Islamist terrorist group.

==== Economic crisis and the Aragalaya ====
Sri Lankan President Maithripala Sirisena decided not to seek re-election in the 2019 presidential election. In 2019, Gotabaya Rajapaksa, former wartime defence chief and brother of former president Mahinda Rajapaksa was elected as the new President of Sri Lanka, as the candidate for the SLPP, a newly-formed Sinhalese-Buddhist nationalist party. In August 2020 parliamentary elections, the party, led by the Rajapaksa brothers, won a landslide victory. Mahinda Rajapaksa was inaugurated as the new Prime Minister of Sri Lanka.

Economic troubles in Sri Lanka began in 2019, when a severe economic crisis began caused by rapidly increasing foreign debt, massive government budget deficits due to tax cuts, a food crisis caused by mandatory organic farming along with a ban on chemical fertilizers, and a multitude of other factors. The Sri Lankan Government officially declared the ongoing crisis to be the worst economic crisis in the country in 73 years. In August 2021, a food emergency was declared. In June 2022, Prime Minister Ranil Wickremesinghe declared the collapse of the Sri Lankan economy in parliament. The crisis resulted in Sri Lanka defaulting on its $51 billion sovereign debt for the first time in its history, along with double-digit inflation, a crippling energy crisis that led to 15 hour power cuts, severe fuel shortages leading to the suspension of fuel to all non-essential vehicles, and more. Due to the crisis, massive street protests erupted across the country, with protesters demanding the resignation of the then-incumbent President Gotabaya Rajapaksa. The protests culminated with the storming of the President's House on July 9, 2022, and resulted in President Gotabaya Rajapaksa fleeing to Singapore. He later emailed his resignation to parliament, making him the first Sri Lankan president to resign in the middle of his term. On the same day the President's House was stormed, protesters stormed the private residence of the prime minister and burnt it down.

On July 20, 2022, Ranil Wickremesinghe was elected as the ninth President via a parliamentarian election.

=== Post–Aragalaya era (2024–Present) ===
==== Domestic politics ====
On 23 September 2024, Anura Kumara Dissanayake was sworn in as Sri Lanka's new president after winning the presidential election as a left-wing candidate. Later on, Harini Amarasuriya was sworn in as the new Prime Minister of Sri Lanka, became the third woman to hold the role. On 14 November 2024, President Anura Kumara Dissanayake's National People's Power (NPP), a left-leaning alliance, received a two-thirds majority in parliament in Sri Lankan parliamentary election.

==== Foreign relations ====
When the National People’s Power government assumed power following President Dissanayake’s victory in the September 2024, the country’s foreign policy was in disarray lacking clear direction. Sri Lanka’s foreign policy under President Dissanayake was to prioritise economic recovery and regional stability while carefully balancing relations with India, China, and Western powers to safeguard national interests. President Dissanayake’s first overseas visit was to India while his second was to China reflecting Sri Lanka’s intention to maintain friendly relations with both countries.

Dissanayake has indicated that Sri Lanka intends to gain BRICS membership, initiated by the previous government. Although invited to attend the BRICS summit in Kazan in October 2024, Dissanayake indicated that he would be unable to attend due to the elections in the country and will instead send a delegation to the summit.

==== Economy ====
In late 2024, Sri Lanka's economy demonstrated significant signs of recovery. The World Bank reported that the country's economy stabilized, with growth expected to reach 4.4% in 2024, surpassing earlier forecasts. This positive outlook followed four consecutive quarters of growth driven by the industrial and tourism sectors, supported by critical structural and policy reforms.. Additionally, inflation dropped to 0.5% as of August 2024 from a high of 64% in 2022. Coupled with the GDP growth experienced, this set a good economic foundation for residents' living standards and economic confidence.

The International Monetary Fund (IMF) also acknowledged Sri Lanka's progress, approving the third review of the country's $2.9 billion bailout in November 2024. The IMF noted that signs of economic recovery were emerging, although it cautioned that the economy remained vulnerable and emphasized the need for continued reforms and debt restructuring.

Sri Lanka finalized a $12.55 billion debt restructuring in December 2024, including Governance-Linked Bonds (GLBs) and Macro-Linked Bonds (MLBs). These complex restructuring instruments will give the country additional debt relief in the case of further economic downturn and rewards the country for improvements in governance. Sri Lanka signed a $2.5 billion debt restructuring agreement with Japan which states that the debts will be paid in semi-annual installments between January 2028 and July 2042.

Additionally, the Central Bank of Sri Lanka introduced a new single policy rate of 8% in November 2024, moving away from the previous dual-rate system. This move aimed to support the country's economic recovery following the severe financial crisis.

Economic growth is expected to moderate to 3.5 percent in 2025 reflecting scarring effects of the crisis and structural impediments to growth, amid global headwinds and unprecedented global trade policy uncertainty.

==== Tourism ====
In July 2025 the Government of Sri Lanka waives fees for visas from 33 countries in addition to the seven that already enjoy visa fee waiver in its goal of attracting 3 million visitors for the year and earning $5 billion in tourism revenue. In 2024 the government targeted 2.05 million tourists and roughly $3 billion of tourism revenue.

As of July 2025 a total of 1,313,232 foreign visitors have arrived in the country.

==== Emigration ====
As a result of the economic crisis the country has been experiencing a significant brain drain with over 300,000 people leaving Sri Lanka for foreign employment in 2024 alone.

==== Disasters ====
In November 2024 Cyclone Fengal crossed Sri Lanka in depression stage, it caused significant damage. Nearly 480,000 people were displaced, 17 were killed and 20 were injured, with 103 homes destroyed and 2,635 others damaged.

== See also ==
- History of Sri Lanka
- Communism in Sri Lanka
- Ceylon in World War II
