= Rupasinghe =

Rupasinghe is a surname. Notable people with the surname include:

- Ajith Rupasinghe Surendra (1943–2017), Sri Lankan political activist
- Gihan Rupasinghe (born 1986), Sri Lankan cricketer
- Hugh Fred Rupasinghe (1931–2019), Sri Lanka Army officer
- Manisha Rupasinghe (born 2001), Sri Lankan cricketer
- Neil Rupasinghe, Sri Lankan politician
- Nisitha Rupasinghe (born 1979), Sri Lankan cricketer
