= Premalal Kumarasiri =

Sri Lankan politician (1919–2004)

Hon. Premalal Kumarasiri
- பிரேமலால் குமாரசிறி ප්‍රේමලාල් කුමාරසිරි

Member of the Ceylon Parliament for Hakmana
- In office 1947–1952
- Preceded by: Seat created
- Succeeded by: C. A. Dharmapala

Personal details
- Born: 12 December 1919 Gonapinuwala
- Died: October 2004 (aged 84)
- Party: Ceylon Communist Party (Maoist)
- Other political affiliations: Communist Party of Ceylon
- Spouse: Menike
- Children: Kanthilal
- Education: Richmond College, Galle, Ananda College, Colombo
- Occupation: Communist
- Known for: Maoist politics

Premalal Kumarasiri (12 December 1919 - October 2004) was a Sri Lankan communist politician and former member of parliament.

Premalal Kumarasiri was born on 12 December 1919 in Gonapinuwala, a village in the south of Sri Lanka. He attended the local village school and then Ananda College in Colombo. After graduating he took up full-time work for the Communist Party of Ceylon.

In 1947 he was elected to the first parliament of Ceylon, representing the Hakmana electorate, as the Ceylon Communist Party's candidate. At only twenty-eight years old he was the youngest sitting member of the parliament.

In 1963 Kumarasiri organised the formation of the Ceylon Communist Party (Maoist) with N. Shanmugathasan, D. N. Nadunge, D. K. D. Jinendrapala, Higgoda Dharmasena, K. Manickavasagar, N. L. Perera, K. Wimalapala, K. Kulaveerasingham, W. S. de Siriwardene, A. D. Charleshamy, Watson Fernando, W. A. Dharmadasa, S. M. Wickremasinghe, A. Jayasuriya, D. A. Gunasekera, Cyril Kulatunge, Victor Silva, K.A. Subramaniam, Susima, K. V. Krishnakutty, S. Janapriya, Kanti Abeyasekere, E. T. Moorthy, Dharmadasa Jayakoddy, H. G. A. de Silva, S. M. P. de Silva, H. M. P. Mohideen, D. M. J. Abeyagunewardene, O. A. Ramiah, D. B. Alwis, C. S. Manohar, S. Sivadasan, Samarasiri de Silva and P. Wijayatileke. Kumarasiri was the first General Secretary of the Ceylon Communist Party (Maoist).

He received the first Premier of the People's Republic of China on behalf of the Ceylon Communist Party (Maoist) when Zhou Enlai visited Sri Lanka in 1964.
