= K. A. Subramaniam =

- கே. ஏ. சுப்பிரமணியம்

Co-founder of Communist Party of Sri Lanka (Left)

Personal details
- Born: 5 March 1931 Kollankaladdy, Sri Lanka
- Died: 27 November 1989 (aged 58) Kandy, Sri Lanka
- Party: Ceylon Communist Party (until 1964); Ceylon Communist Party (Maoist) (1964-1978); Communist Party of Sri Lanka (Left) (from 1978)
- Spouse: Valliammai
- Children: Sathiarajan (Meeran Master; 1962–2001), Sathiamalar (Buby) and Satheakeerthy
- Occupation: Communist

K. A. Subramaniam (5 March 1931 – 27 November 1989) was a Sri Lankan leftist political leader. He was one of the key member for the formation of the Ceylon Communist Party (Maoist). He was the founding General Secretary of the Communist Party of Sri Lanka (Left)

== Early life and background ==
Subramaniam was born on 5 March 1931 in the agricultural village of Kollankaladdy, near Tellippalai and Keerimalai in the northern Jaffna District of British Ceylon. He was the son of Kathirippillai Ambalappillai and Deivanaipillai Ilangkanayagamuthali. He began his primary schooling locally and attended St. Joseph's College in Colombo before completing his secondary education at St. Henry's College, Ilavalai..

In 1948, at the age of 17, he entered the Kankesanthurai (K.K.S.) Cement Factory as an engineering apprentice. Influenced by communist co-workers, he joined trade union organizing in the factory and was dismissed by the administration for his labor activities.

== Political career ==
=== Early communist organizing and CCP(M) formation ===
Subramaniam entered full-time radical politics in 1951 by joining the Communist Youth Movement and formally becoming a member of the Communist Party of Sri Lanka (CPSL). Mentored by pioneer northern communists including V. Ponnampalam, M. Karthigesan, Dr. S. V. Seenivasagam, Pon. Kandiah, and A. Vaithilingam, he was assigned to organize the Kankesanthurai electorate and Chunnakam. During the 1953 Ceylonese Hartal, the 22-year-old Subramaniam helped lead successful strike campaigns throughout the Jaffna Peninsula. By the late 1950s, he was serving on the CPSL Northern Regional Committee and as Regional Secretary of the Communist Youth Movement.

During the Sino-Soviet split, Subramaniam aligned with the pro-Beijing Marxist–Leninist wing headed by N. Sanmugathasan and Premalal Kumarasiri. On 17 November 1963, Subramaniam was named to the 35-member organizing committee that initiated the party split, leading to the formal foundation of the Ceylon Communist Party (Maoist) at its congress in January 1964.

=== International delegations: China and Albania ===
A committed proponent of proletarian internationalism, Subramaniam prioritized forging fraternal relationships with socialist states and communist parties worldwide. He visited the People's Republic of China on four occasions—in 1963, 1967, 1975, and 1979—and traveled to Albania in 1967 as a delegate of party, youth, and trade union goodwill missions:

- 1963 (China): In June 1963, representing the Ceylon Federation of Communist and Progressive Youth Leagues alongside D. B. Alwis, he traveled across China, met Vice Premier and Foreign Minister Chen Yi, and signed a joint fraternal declaration with Chieng Li-jen, Vice President of the All-China Youth Federation.
- 1967 (China and Albania): In 1967, he went to the People's Socialist Republic of Albania, where he delivered an address representing Ceylon at the 15th Congress of the Union of Working Youth of Albania, then proceeded to China on a goodwill party mission. (Kongresi i 5-të i BRPSH).
- 1975 (China): In 1975, he participated in an official party delegation to China alongside S. K. Senthivel, Kanti Abeyasekere, and Ratnayake, to study major industrial and agricultural collectives.
- 1979 (China): In late 1979, following the split and foundation of the CPSL (Left), he led a party mission to Beijing accompanied by Thayagam editor K. Thanikasalam. During this visit, he met senior Chinese Communist Party leaders including Vice Premier Ji Pengfei, discussed international Marxist politics, and traveled through Yunnan province, including Kunming.

=== Leadership of the Anti-Untouchability Movement (1966–1974) ===
Subramaniam served as the foremost field strategist of the mass campaigns against caste-based discrimination in the Jaffna Peninsula.. On 21 October 1966, he organized and led the historic march from Chunnakam to Jaffna town demanding the eradication of untouchability, an event widely recognized as the launch of the October 21 Upsurge.

Working alongside civil rights leader S. T. N. Nagaratnam, novelist K. Daniel, Dr. S. V. Seenivasagam, V.A. Kandasamy, N. Shanmugathasan and S. K. Senthivel, Subramaniam directed the Untouchability Eradication Mass Movement (Theendaamai Ozhappu Vekujana Iyakkam). He coordinated direct-action campaigns to secure equal seating and dining in tea-stalls (samapandhi bhojanam), open public drinking-water wells, and desegregate village temples at Chankanai-Nitchamam, Madduvil, Karaveddy-Kanpolai, and the historic 1968 confrontation at the Maviddapuram Kandaswamy Temple. When activists faced criminal charges and trials, Subramaniam managed their legal representation with progressive advocates such as Supreme Court Justice T. W. Rajaratnam.

=== 1969 May Day confrontation ===
On 1 May 1969, the United National Party government banned public May Day rallies across Sri Lanka because the date coincided with the Buddhist holiday of Vesak. Subramaniam and northern trade unions chose to defy the restriction. Operating from underground to evade police monitoring, he coordinated an assembly outside the Windsor and Rajah theatres in Jaffna and led a large procession carrying red flags into the city center. Police dispersed the march with a baton charge and tear gas, causing severe bleeding injuries to Subramaniam before arresting him. After hospital care in Jaffna, he spent several months recovering at Sanmugathasan's home in Colombo. The police assault was raised and debated in Parliament by MP S. D. Bandaranayake.

=== Split and foundation of the CPSL (Left) ===
Following the 1971 JVP insurrection and subsequent organizational crises, ideological divisions intensified within the CCP(M). Subramaniam argued that the party should reject sectarian dogmatism, adopt the international Three Worlds Theory, and recognize the right of self-determination for the Tamil national minority within Sri Lanka.

At a special party conference in mid-1978, a report submitted under Subramaniam's leadership was rejected by Sanmugathasan. Consequently, on 3 July 1978, delegates convened in Jaffna to form the Communist Party of Sri Lanka (Left), selecting Subramaniam as Secretary of the interim Organizing Committee. At its First National Congress in September 1984, he was elected General Secretary, a role he maintained until his death. The party subsequently renamed itself the New-Democratic Marxist-Leninist Party (NDMLP).Between 1978 and 1981, Subramaniam edited the English-language theoretical organ Red Banner, published in Jaffna.

=== Stand on the National Question and later activism ===
Subramaniam advocated for the right of self-determination of the Tamil people while opposing separate statehood and regional militarism. He stated that armed escalation alone could not resolve the ethnic conflict, calling instead for an equitable political settlement through tripartite negotiations between Tamil representatives, the Sri Lankan state, and India.

Following the 1987 Indo-Sri Lanka Accord, Subramaniam opposed the deployment of the Indian Peace Keeping Force (IPKF) and the detention of militant leaders. During the 1988 Sri Lankan presidential election, despite political tension and declining health, he campaigned across northern Sri Lanka in support of Sirimavo Bandaranaike's coalition.

== Cultural contributions ==
Subramaniam was a prominent patron of progressive Tamil literature. He co-founded the National Arts and Literary Association (Thesiya Kalai Ilakkiya Peravai) and provided editorial direction to its publication, Thayagam. He maintained close associations with literary figures including K. Kailasapathy, S. Sivasegaram, and R. Murugaiyan, and facilitated the translation and publication of Hungarian poet Sándor Petőfi's works into Tamil. Subramaniam also managed the circulation of party periodicals including Sempathahai, Red Banner, and Puthiya Boomi.

== Personal life ==
On 19 January 1962, Subramaniam entered into an inter-caste marriage with Valliammai Asaipillai ("Mani"), a teacher and writer affiliated with the Sri Lanka Progressive Writers' Association. They had three children: Sathiarajan, Sathiamalar ("Buby"), and Satheakeerthy.

Their eldest son, Sathiarajan (known by the nom de guerre "Meeran Master"), joined the People's Liberation Organisation of Tamil Eelam (PLOTE), was imprisoned under the Prevention of Terrorism Act from 1984 to 1987, and died in an accident in 2001. Their second son, Satheakeerthy, became an engineer. Valliammai later chronicled their family life and political activism in her memoir, Oru Communist Inaiyar Vaazhvin Santhippukal (Life Encounters of a Communist Spouse).

== Death and legacy ==
Subramaniam died on 27 November 1989 at the Kandy General Hospital at the age of 58. His remains were transported to Jaffna and laid in state at the party headquarters before being taken to his residence, "Sathiamanai" in Chulipuram. His funeral on 30 November 1989 was presided over by S. K. Senthivel and attended by trade unionists, political leaders, and writers; per his convictions, it was held without religious rites.

His book collection formed the foundation of the K.A.S Sathiamanai Library in Chulipuram. Annual memorial lectures in his honor have been delivered by scholars including Jayadeva Uyangoda and Tone Marie Buberg. In 2014, S. K. Senthivel authored the biographical volume Thozhar Maniam Ninaivukal (Comrade Maniam Memories).
