= Rohana Wijeweera =

Sri Lankan politician and revolutionary (1943–1989)

- රෝහණ විජේවීර; ரோகண விஜயவீர

1st Leader of the Janatha Vimukthi Peramuna
- In office 14 May 1965 – 13 November 1989
- Preceded by: Position Established
- Succeeded by: Saman Piyasiri Fernando

Personal details
- Born: Patabendige Don Nandasiri Wijeweera; 14 July 1943 Kottegoda, Matara, British Ceylon
- Died: 13 November 1989 (age 46) Borella, Colombo, Sri Lanka
- Cause of death: Assassination by firearm
- Party: Ceylon Communist Party (until 1964); Ceylon Communist Party-Peking Wing (1965); Janatha Vimukthi Peramuna (from 14 May 1965)
- Other political affiliations: Patriotic People's Front
- Education: Goda Uda Government Senior School; Dharmasoka College
- Alma mater: Lumumba University
- Occupation: Political activist and revolutionary

Military service
- Battles/wars: First JVP Insurrection; Second JVP Insurrection

Patabendi Don Jinadasa Nandasiri Wijeweera (Sinhala: පටබැඳි දොන් ජිනදාස නන්දසිරි විජෙවීර; 14 July 1943 – 13 November 1989), better known as Rohana Wijeweera, was a Sri Lankan Marxist–Leninist political activist, revolutionary, and founder of the Janatha Vimukthi Peramuna (JVP; transl. People's Liberation Front). Wijeweera led the party in two unsuccessful insurrections in Sri Lanka, in 1971 and 1987 until his assassination.

He formed the JVP in 1965, with the intention of replacing the Dominion of Ceylon with a socialist republic. The JVP opposed Tamil self-determination as well as the Liberation Tigers of Tamil Eelam.

Following the Indo-Lanka accord, the JVP, with the leadership of Wijeweera and a secondary faction, launched a military and social campaign with the aim of overthrowing the government of Sri Lanka. This included two major insurgencies, in 1971 and 1987–1989.

In 1989, the government of Sri Lanka then launched Operation Combine with the intention of killing Wijeweera, along with Upatissa Gamanayake. While they succeeded in killing Wijeweera, the JVP maintained its identity as a political party and later joined a coalition government, and eventually in 2024 came into power.

== Early life ==
Patabendi Don Jinadasa Nandasiri Wijeweera was born on 14 July 1943, to Patabendi Don Andris Wijeweera and Nasi Nona Wickramakalutota, who lived in Kottegoda, a coastal village situated close to Matara in southern Sri Lanka. His family mostly belonged to the Karava caste hierarchy. The eldest in the family, he had a younger brother Ananda and a younger sister Chitranie.

His father, who ran a small business, was an active member of the Ceylon Communist Party and very close to Dr. S. A. Wickramasinghe. He was disabled after an attack by thugs believed to be members of an opposing political party during the 1947 Parliamentary election campaign for the Hakmana electorate candidate Premalal Kumarasiri. Don Andris Wijeweera died in 1965.

== Education ==
Wijeweera had his primary education at Goda Uda Government School in Kottegoda from 1947 to 1953. In 1954 he entered Goda Uda Government Senior School and was there until mid-1959. He entered Ambalangoda Dharmashoka College in July 1959 to study GCE Ordinary Level in the science stream. Although he passed the exam, gaining credit grades for some subjects, he was not able to continue his studies due to limited family finances.

Having become active in the communist party, he applied and gained a scholarship to attend Lumumba University in Moscow to study medicine. In September 1960 he travelled to the Soviet Union to begin his studies. He completed the Russian language examination within seven and a half months, obtaining a distinction, and spent his holidays travelling through the USSR. He also worked during this time as an agricultural worker in the Moldavian Socialist Republic. He worked through his medical studies well up to third year and also obtained a distinction in political economics in 1963.

In late 1963 he became ill and received medical treatment from a hospital in Moscow, but finally requested a full academic term of medical leave and returned to Ceylon. At that time the Communist Party of Ceylon was divided into two groups which were pro-Chinese and pro-Soviet. A vocal supporter of the pro-Chinese wing Ceylon Communist Party (Maoist), Wijeweera did not get a visa to return to the USSR.

== Political career, 1965–1971 ==
Following his ideological dispute with the Communist Party of Soviet Union, Wijeweera became a functionary of the Ceylon Communist Party-Peking Wing the pro-China faction of the Communist Party of Sri Lanka. There he started an admiration for Josef Stalin and also for Mao Zedong; he met with members of the Labour Party of Albania in 1965, as they visited Ceylon.

=== New Left Movement ===
Soon Wijeweera was impatient with the CCP Maoist leaders due to what he saw as their lack of revolutionary purpose, and formed his own movement on 14 May 1965 after a discussion held in a house at Akmeemana in the Galle district with like-minded youth. He visited North Korea to broaden support for the newly formed movement.

Initially identified simply as the "New Left", this group drew on students and unemployed youths from rural areas, most of them in the 16 to 25-year-old range who felt that their economic interests had been neglected by the nation's leftist coalition governments. It became popularly known as the New Left Movement, a Marxist political party, but not Maoist.

After forming the political movement, Wijeweera named it Janatha Vimukthi Peramuna (JVP). He conducted a series of political lectures for the purpose of educating the youths according to the Marxist-Leninist doctrine. These lectures, popularly known as JVP five classes, eventually became the key manifesto of their political ideology.

- Crisis of the capitalist system in Sri Lanka
- The history of the left movement in Sri Lanka
- The history of the socialist revolutions
- Indian expansionism
- The path of revolution in Sri Lanka

Capturing state power for the purpose of implementing the JVP's socio-economic policies in the country was the key part of Wijeweera's political agenda. During the late 1960s, Wijeweera and the JVP consisted of disillusioned youths who believed that armed struggle is the most suitable way to a socialist revolution.

== 1971 Insurrection ==
In 1970 while campaigning for the United Front of Sirimavo Bandaranaike in the general election, Wijeweera was arrested following the riot in front of the U.S embassy, but released shortly as the pro-socialist United Front won the elections.

In April 1971 JVP led an armed campaign known as the 1971 April Uprising, a failed attempt to overthrow the Dominion of Ceylon under the government of Prime Minister Sirimavo Bandaranaike. North Korean boats were arrested attempting to arm the JVP.

Wijeweera was arrested before the armed attack took place in April 1971. He was later brought before the Criminal Justice Commission (CJC) that was formed after the failed insurrection. The commission sentenced him to life imprisonment, after which he made an historic speech, stating "We May Be Killed But Our Voice Will Never Die", echoing "History Will Absolve Me" by Fidel Castro at the end of Moncada Barracks trial in 1953. On appeal the sentence was reduced to 20 years rigorous imprisonment.

== Political career, 1977–1983 ==
After the victory of the pro-United States United National Party in the 1977 elections, the new government attempted to broaden its mandate with a period of political tolerance. Wijeweera was freed. The new government also tried to destroy its opposition from the pro-Soviet Union United Front.

=== Presidential elections ===
After the ban on the party was lifted, the JVP entered the arena of legal political competition. As a candidate in the 1982 presidential elections, Wijeweera finished third, with more than 250,000 votes (4%, as compared with Jayewardene's 3.2 million).

=== 1987–1989 Insurrection ===
In 1987, the JVP launched a second insurrection. Unlike in 1971, this was not an open revolt, but a low intensity conflict with subversion, assassinations, raids, and attacks on military and civilian targets.

== Final days ==
In October 1989, following the arrest and interrogation of two leading JVP members, Wijeweera was arrested, who had been living on a tea estate in Ulapane, masquerading as a planter under the name of Attanayake.

== Death ==
On 13 November 1989, Wijeweera, along with Upatissa Gamanayake were gunned down, but the actual circumstances remain a subject of speculation. Several versions of his death were circulated following the incident. The Sri Lankan Army stated that he had been shot in a confrontation between members of the JVP and the Army when he was taken under custody to help look at a JVP safe house. A rumour circulated that he was taken to a cemetery, shot in the leg and then summarily executed by being burnt alive in the crematorium. The official statement from Minister of State Defence Ranjan Wijeratne was that Wijeweera and fellow JVP member H.B. Herath had been taken to the safe house to help the Army locate part of the JVP's "treasure", while the search was in progress Herath had pulled out a gun and shot Wijeweera dead. It is widely believed that it was a politically motivated assassination and that the Army, at the behest of the Government, was responsible for his death. The Government itself gave conflicting answers, Foreign Minister A. C. S. Hameed corroborated Defence Minister Wijeratne's account that Herath had shot at Wijeweera, but states that the Army subsequently opened fire upon the two, killing both.

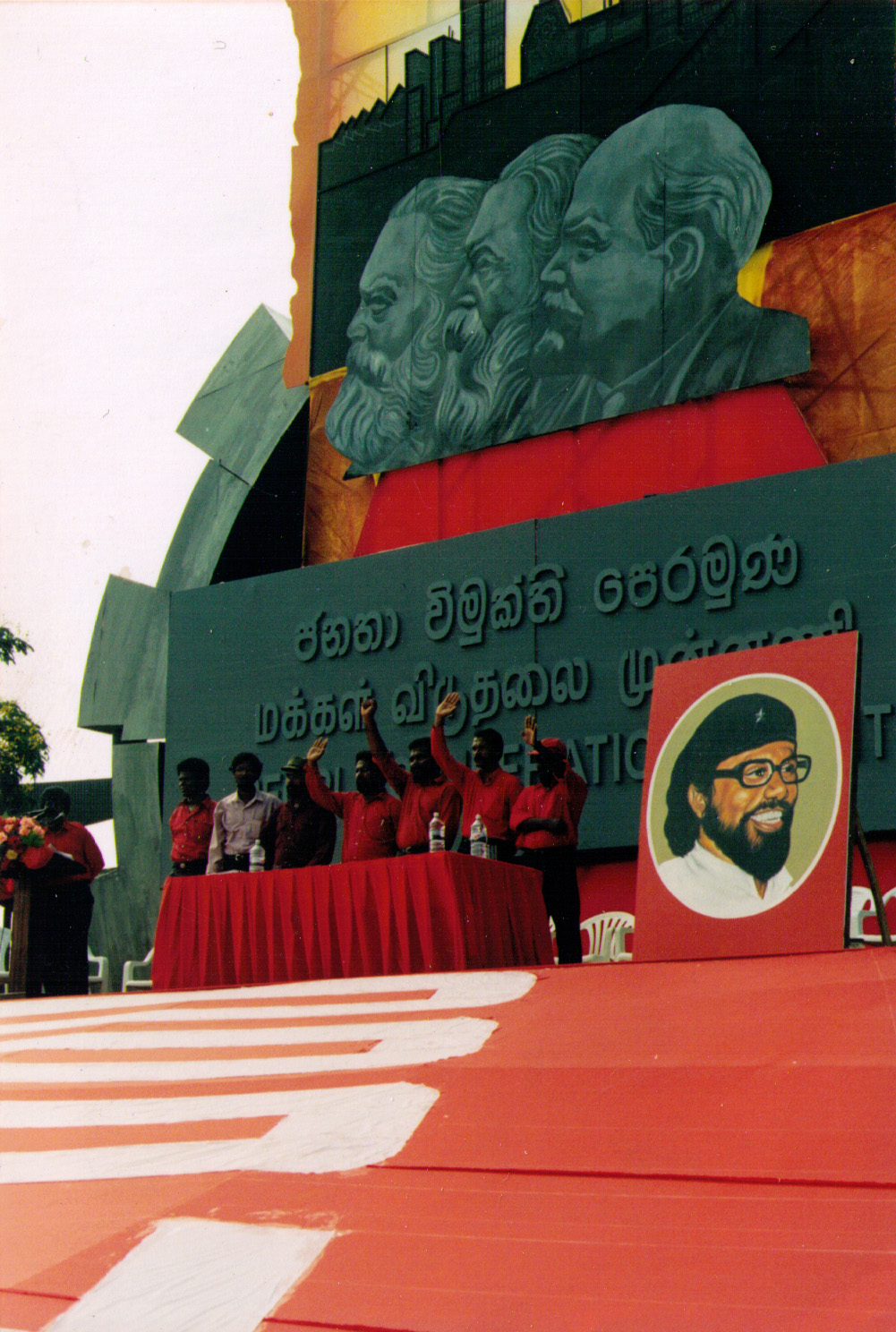
JVP leadership at May Day Celebration in Colombo in 1999, with a portrait of Wijeweera on the right.

== Works ==
In 1971 Wijeeweera wrote the book A Few Experiences (ISBN 978-955-8696-25-5) regarding his experiences during the first JVP insurgency. It was originally written in Sinhala. Wijeweera wrote "What is the answer for the Eelam Question" following the beginning of the Sri Lankan Civil War.

== Family ==
Wijeweera married Srimathi Chitrangani, with whom he had four daughters and two sons. After his death in 1989, his widow and children handed themselves over to the Army Headquarters and the government assured protection for the family. They were housed at the staff quarters in SLN Dockyard in Trincomalee and later in 1999 were moved to staff quarters in the naval barracks at SLNS Gemunu in Welisara where they have lived under state patronage. In February 2015, the Security Council decided that there was no security threat and requested the family to vacate the naval quarters that they were occupying.

In the 2020s, one of Wijeweera's sons, Uvindu Wijeweera, established a political party of his own, the Devana Parapura.

== In popular media ==
The biographical film of Wijeweera's late life titled Ginnen Upan Seethala was made in 2019. The film was directed by Anurudha Jayasinghe and popular actor Kamal Addararachchi played Wijeweera's role.

== See also ==
- Communism in Sri Lanka
- Nagalingam Shanmugathasan
- Vijaya Kumaratunga

Party political offices
Preceded by Position Established	Leader of Janatha Vimukthi Peramuna; 14 May 1965 – 13 November 1989	Succeeded by Saman Piyasiri Fernando
