= Ceylon Trade Union Federation =

The Ceylon Trade Union Federation (abbreviated CTUF) was a national trade union centre in Ceylon/Sri Lanka. CTUF was founded in December 1940, and united various unions led by the United Socialist Party. The founding meeting of CTUF was chaired by a Buddhist monk, Ven. Saranankara. Pieter Keuneman served as CTUF president for some time.

Soon after its foundation, CTUF ordered its affiliates to reorganise from company unions to unions by industrial sector.

CTUF led a major strike amongst harbour workers in July 1941. During the remainder of the Second World War, the party adopted a policy of avoiding confrontations as a way to support the 'anti-fascist' war effort. As of 1944 CTUF represented eleven unions with a combined membership of 18,000. After the formation of the Communist Party in 1943, CTUF remained closely tied to the new party. CTUF joined the World Federation of Trade Unions in 1945. On September 15, 1945 CTUF organized a mass rally to the State Council to demand solution to unemployment problem. As the government refused to hear the demands of the protestors, CTUF organized a token half-day strike, mobilizing some 8,000 workers, followed by a six-day strike of some 30,000 workers. The strike was settled after the Mayor of Colombo intervened.

In April 1958 a strike action of CTUF, the Ceylon Mercantile Union and the Ceylon Federation of Labour resulted in violence between striking workers and police.

In 1962 CTUF reached its peak strength, organizing almost 80,000 members. As of 1963 CTUF organized 31 unions with 68,130 members. In the internal split in the Communist Party in 1963, CTUF was seized by the Peking Wing faction. At the time of the split N. Shanmugathasan was the general secretary of CTUF, and A.D. Charleshamy and H. Jayawardena its vice presidents. Following the split in the Communist Party, Watson Fernando became president of CTUF whilst N. Shanmugathasan remained as general secretary. In response to the Communist Party (Peking Wing) taking control of CTUF, the Communist Party (Moscow Wing) set up the Ceylon Federation of Trade Unions (CFTU).

After the 1971 JVP insurrection, the Communist Party (Peking Wing) was targeted by government repression. Many leaders of the party were arrested. CTUF was temporarily disbanded. By 1974 CTUF had become practically defunct. Most CTUF leaders joined CFTU instead, some joined other groups.
