= List of Lanka Sama Samaja breakaway parties =

Since Sri Lanka gained independence in 1948, the Lanka Sama Samaja Party (LSSP) has seen a steady number of splits and breakaway factions. Some of the breakaway organisations have succeeded as independent parties, some have become defunct, while others have merged with the parent party or other political parties.

== List of breakaway parties ==
Year	Party	Founder(s)	Region	Status
1942	Bolshevik–Leninist Party of India, Ceylon and Burma	Leslie Goonewardene	International	Merged into the Bolshevik Samasamaja Party in 1948
1948	Communist Party of Sri Lanka	Dr. S. A. Wickramasinghe	National	Active
1948	Bolshevik Samasamaja Party	Colvin R de Silva, Leslie Goonewardene and Edmund Samarakkoddy	National	Merged into the Lanka Sama Samaja Party in 1950
1950	Viplavakari Lanka Sama Samaja Party	Philip Gunawardena	National	Merged into the Mahajana Eksath Peramuna in 1959
1959	Mahajana Eksath Peramuna	Philip Gunawardena and PH William de Silva	National	Active
1964	Lanka Sama Samaja Party (Revolutionary)	Edmund Samarakkody, Meryl Fernando, V. Karalasingham and P. Bala Tampoe	National	Merged into the Revolutionary Workers Party
1968	Revolutionary Workers Party	Edmund Samarakkoddy	National	Defunct
1968	Socialist Equality Party	Keerthi Balasooriya	National	Active
1972	Communist Party of Sri Lanka (Marxist–Leninist)	Watson Fernando, Ariyawansa Gunasekara and V.A. Kandasamy	National	Defunct
1977	Nava Sama Samaja Party	Vikramabahu Karunaratne and Sumanasiri Liyanage	National	Active
1982	Sri Lanka Sama Samaja Party	Anil Moonesinghe	National	Dissolved in 1983
