= All Ceylon United Motor Workers' Union =

The All Ceylon United Motor Workers Union is a trade union which organises workers in the passenger bus sector in Sri Lanka. It is affiliated to the Ceylon Federation of Labour (CFL).

== History ==
Omnibus transport first began in Sri Lanka as an owner-operated service. There was no regulation, so when more than one bus operated on a single route there was a scramble for the load, which might end in fisticuffs or even stabbings. The setting up of the limited liability omnibus companies by the British around 1940 was the first meaningful step to regularise public passenger transport in this country. The employees were treated abominably: one owner allegedly tied a bus conductor to a tree and spanked the poor man for failing to bring in the targeted collection for the day.

Trade union work was an uphill task and members of the Lanka Sama Samaja Party (LSSP) had to proceed in secret, disguising themselves to avoid company thugs. J. Wanigatunga was one of the union agents so deployed.

In February 1936 the LSSP was able to take leadership in a spontaneous island-wide 2-day strike of motor workers that took place against the motor laws which provided for the cancellation of driving licences for trivial offences. There was opposition from the Ceylon Labour Party of A.E. Goonesinghe, which went so far as to provide employers with blackleg labour to break strikes led by the Samasamajists. However, the organisation of the bus workers went forward slowly.

A strike wave in May 1941 affected the workers on the Fort-Mount Lavinia bus route. On 22 November 1945 the Motor Workers Union launched its island-wide bus strike. N.M. Perera, Philip Gunawardena, Somaweera Chandrasiri, W.J. Perera, George Perera and Leslie Goonewardene (who had just returned from India after underground work in the independence movement there) were arrested and prosecuted for supporting a strike in an essential service. However, the strike was a success, and the bus owners, who were the most stubbornly anti-union section of the capitalists in Sri Lanka had made important concessions. In the Jaffna peninsula, the organisations of the bus workers came over to the Motor Workers Union.

=== Hartal ===
On the eve of the "Hartal" (or 'general strike'), on 11 August 1953, the South-Western Bus Company workers came to a strike decision and its owner, Cyril de Zoysa, stated to union representatives that he left his employees free to act as they thought best. It thereby became certain that the biggest bus operator in Sri Lanka would not function on 12 August. The news about the SW Bus Co had been sent to other bus lines by LSSP leaflets the same evening.

However, certain bus owners announced of that they would run their buses, whatever the situation. The general public, among whom they were anyway not very popular, directed their anger against these defiant owners. This was especially true of the Gamini Bus Co Ltd and the High Level Road Bus Co Ltd. Their buses were stopped, stoned, and smashed by the angered people. Their principal routes were then blocked at numerous points with felled trees, so that even a military escort could not get their buses through. It was not for several days that these companies could resume their normal services. On the other hand, the South Western Bus Company was able to resume most of its services promptly after 12 August. Their routes had not been unduly blocked, and their vehicles had largely escaped damage.

=== Ceylon Transport Board ===
Immediately after the nationalisation of the bus companies in 1958, the Motor Workers’ Union successfully concluded negotiations with the Ceylon Transport Board on many demands, amongst which was the payment of Government rates of cost of living allowances to the employees. However, both in 1961 and 1963 C.T.B. employees won further gains only through major strikes.

The bus workers joined in a strike on 8 January 1967 aimed at protection of concessions won over the past several years. As a result, the union suffered heavy victimisation – which was later rectified by the law courts as well as by government intervention after the United Front election victory in 1970.

Again in the General Strike of 1980, the bus workers faced victimisation, including assault by the goons of the Jathika Sevaka Sangamaya (JSS) who, with government backing attacked other workers with bicycle chains and iron bars.
