= Communist Party of Sri Lanka (Marxist–Leninist) =

Communist Party of Sri Lanka (Marxist-Leninist)
- Abbreviation: CPSL (M-L)
- Founders: Watson Fernando; E.T Moorthy; D. A. Gunasekara; V.A. Kandasamy
- Founded: 1972
- Split from: Ceylon Communist Party (Maoist)
- Ideology: Communism; Marxism–Leninism; Maoism; Anti-revisionism
- Political position: Far-left
- Colors: Red

Party flag

The Communist Party of Sri Lanka (Marxist–Leninist) (abbreviated CPSL(M-L)) was a political party in Sri Lanka. The party originated in a split in the Ceylon Communist Party (Peking Wing) (CP(P)), as tension had risen between N. Shanmugathasan (who maintained opposition to the new United Front government) and Watson Fernando (who argued that the UF was a 'progressive force'). On September 22, 1972 the N. Shanmugathasan-led Central Committee of CP(P) declared Fernando and fellow CC members Ariyawansa Gunasekara and V.A. Kandasamy expelled. On November 12, 1972 Fernando's group declared itself as the CPSL(M-L).

Like the Communist Party (Peking Wing), the CPSL(M-L) sought to maintain contacts with the Chinese Communist Party. Notably, CPSL(M-L) retained support for official Chinese party line after the death of Mao Zedong and the ouster of the Gang of Four. On October 20, 1976 D.N. Nadunge, member of the Secretariat of the Central Committee of CPSL(M-L) sent a letter to the Central Committee of the Chinese Communist Party, congratulating Hua Guofeng on his appointment as new party chairman.

== Maoism in the party ==
The party strongly promoted Maoist ideology. After the death of Mao Zedong, the party continued to denounce the new Chinese ideology, though it still refused the join the Revolutionary Internationalist Movement.

== Strength of the party ==
The party would remain weak compared to Ceylon Communist Party (Maoist) but the party would gain favor among the communists as the "New Peking Wing" alongside the New-Democratic Marxist-Leninist Party. The party was heavily declined during the 87-89 Insurrections and went underground among many other Far-left parties in the country.

== See also ==
- Communist Party of India (Marxist-Leninist)
- Bolshevik-Leninist Party of India
