= Ajith Rupasinghe Surendra =

Sri Lankan political activist

- අජිත් රූපසිංහ සුරේන්ද්‍ර

General Secretary of Ceylon Communist Party (Maoist)
- In office 8 February 1993 – 3 April 2017
- Preceded by: N. Sanmugathasan

Personal details
- Born: 14 February 1943
- Died: 3 April 2017 (aged 74) Sri Lanka
- Party: Ceylon Communist Party (Maoist) other affiliation: Communist Party of Nepal (Maoist Centre)
- Spouse: Indrani
- Children: Kusum Byrd
- Education: University of California, Los Angeles
- Occupation: Politician

Ajith Rupasinghe Surendra (14 February 1943 – 3 April 2017) was a Sri Lankan political activist.

While he was living and studying in the United States, he was introduced to communism by his older brother Kumar Rupesinghe. He studied for a PhD in sociology at the University of California, Los Angeles. Surendra supported the Nepal revolution initiated by Communist Party of Nepal (Maoist Centre) through Nepalese Civil War and condemned when they abandoned the war to sign the Comprehensive Peace Accord in 2006

Ajith Rupesinghe returned to Sri Lanka and joined the Ceylon Communist Party (Maoist). He assumed the leadership of the party as the General Secretary after the death of N. Sanmugathasan in 1993, and remained leader until his death in 2017. He took the initiative to distinguish the party name with Ceylon Communist Party and changed from 'Ceylon Communist Party (Peking Wing)' to Ceylon Communist Party (Maoist).

Under the leadership of Surendra the Ceylon Communist Party (Maoist) openly supported Vikramabahu Karunaratne for the 2010 Sri Lankan presidential election. This stand was welcomed by most of the leftist parties because from 1965 the Ceylon Communist Party (Maoist) was boycotting all the elections held in Sri Lanka after N. Sanmugathasan contested in Colombo Central.
