= Sangarapillai Sivathasan =

Sri Lankan political activist (1934–2011)

- சங்கரப்பிள்ளை சிவதாசன்

Jaffna District former Member of Parliament

Personal details
- Born: 21 August 1934 Kollankaladdy
- Died: 12 November 2011 (aged 77) Kollankaladdy, Sri Lanka
- Party: Ceylon Communist Party (Maoist); Eelam People's Democratic Party
- Occupation: Politician former chairman of palmyrah development board

Sangarapillai Sivathasan (21 August 1934 – 12 November 2011) was a Sri Lankan political activist.

Sivathasan was born as second child to Sangarapillai and Sellamuthu in Kollankaladdy near Tellippalai. He studied at St Sylvester's College, Kandy and was very versed in many languages. He joined the Ceylon Communist Party in 1950s and worked closely with Pieter Keuneman, Premalal Kumarasiri and Douglas Devananda's father S. Kathiravelu. He was one of the key member for the formation of the Ceylon Communist Party (Maoist) in 1963. Later he married his comrade Kathiravelu's sister.

In 1986 he was detained by LTTE for his association with EPRLF. In1987 after the Indo-Sri Lanka Accord, he became a Provincial Council Member in the joined North-East Provincial Council. He was a Member of Parliament twice, representing Jaffna district. He was injured in a bomb blast carried out by the LTTE in August 2006 targeting his vehicle in Colombo and survived by a hair's breadth while being the Chairman of the Palmyrah Development Board.
