= People's Struggle Alliance =

Political alliance in Sri Lanka

People’s Struggle Alliance ජන අරගල සන්ධානය மக்கள் போராட்ட முன்னணி
- Chairperson: Nuwan Bopage; Wasantha Mudalige; Lahiru Weerasekara; Tharindu Uduwaragedara
- Founded: 19 June 2024
- Preceded by: Socialist People's Forum
- Headquarters: No. 31/1 Kandawatta Road, Nugegoda
- Ideology: Communism; Marxism–Leninism; Anti-imperialism; Revolutionary socialism; Aragalaya activism
- Political position: Far-left
- Colors: Red; Yellow
- Local Government Members: 16 / 8,793

Election symbol
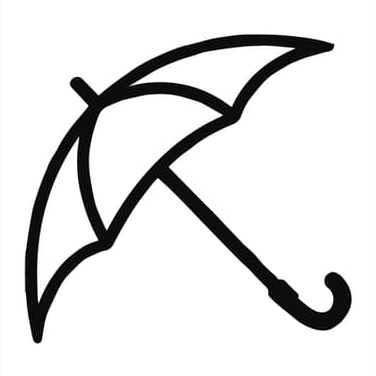
- Umbrella

Website
- www.psalliance.lk

The People's Struggle Alliance is a political alliance in Sri Lanka. Founded in 2024, the alliance consists of former student activists, social activists, journalists and far-left political parties.

The Frontline Socialist Party, the New Democratic Marxist–Leninist Party, Lahiru Weerasekara, national organizer of the 'Youth for Change' organization and Aragalaya activist, Wasantha Mudalige, former convener of the Inter University Students' Federation, and Tharindu Uduwaragedara of the Young Journalists' Association are among the members of the alliance.

== Electoral history ==
Sri Lankan presidential elections
| Election | Candidate | Votes | % | Result |
|---|---|---|---|---|
| 2024 | Nuwan Bopage | 11,191 | 0.08% | Lost |

Sri Lankan parliamentary elections
| Election | Votes | % | Seats | +/– | Result |
|---|---|---|---|---|---|
| 2024 | 29,611 | 0.27% | 0 / 225 | New | Extra-parliamentary |

Sri Lankan local elections
| Election | Votes | % | Councillors | +/– | Ref |
|---|---|---|---|---|---|
| 2025 | 50,492 | 0.48% | 16 / 8,793 | New | |
