= S. K. Senthivel =

Sri Lankan political activist

- එස්. කේ. සෙන්තිවේල්; சி. கா. செந்திவேல்
- S. K. Senthivel
- Born: Sinnathamby Kasipillai Senthivel; 23 November 1943 (age 82); Sirrupiddy, Jaffna District, Ceylon
- Other name: Vekujanan (வெகுஜனன்)
- Education: Sri Somaskanda College, Puttur
- Occupations: Politician; writer; social activist
- Years active: 1964–present
- Known for: Anti-caste activism, left-wing politics, Sri Lankan Tamil literature
- Title: General Secretary, New-Democratic Marxist-Leninist Party (1978–present)
- Other political affiliations: Ceylon Communist Party (Maoist) (1964-1978)
- Spouse: Selvarani
- Children: Nanthan; Gowri; Maniyathas (1991–1998)
- Parents: Kasipillai (father); Nagamma (mother)

Sinnathamby Kasipillai Senthivel (சி. கா. செந்திவேல்; එස්. කේ. සෙන්තිවේල්; born 23 November 1943), commonly known as S. K. Senthivel and by the pen name Vekujanan (வெகுஜனன்), is a Sri Lankan communist politician, author, and civil rights activist. Since 1989, he has served as the General Secretary of the New-Democratic Marxist-Leninist Party (NDMLP).

== Early life ==
Sinnathamby Kasipillai Senthivel was born on 23 November 1943 in Sirrupiddy near Puttur in the Jaffna Peninsula of British Ceylon. He received his secondary education at Sri Somaskanda College in Puttur.

== Political activism and career ==
Senthivel entered active politics during his youth, joining the Ceylon Communist Party (Maoist) as a full-time cadre in 1964 under the leadership of Nagalingam Shanmugathasan. During the 1960s, he was a leading young Marxist organizer in the mass anti-caste movement in northern Sri Lanka, taking an active role in the 21 October 1966 uprising against untouchability and discriminatory practices in temples, schools, and tea shops.

In mid-1968, Senthivel was chosen as one of six party delegates dispatched to socialist Albania, where he completed five months of Marxist-Leninist political education at the V. I. Lenin Party School in Tirana. In 1975, he travelled to the People's Republic of China as part of an official party delegation alongside K. A. Subramaniam to observe the socialist system during the lifetime of Mao Zedong.

Following factional realignment within the Maoist movement in the late 1970s, Senthivel joined K. A. Subramaniam to form the New-Democratic Marxist-Leninist Party (NDMLP). Upon Subramaniam's death in 1989, Senthivel succeeded him as General Secretary.

Throughout his political career spanning over five decades, Senthivel has promoted what he defines as "progressive Tamil nationalism", contrasting working-class and anti-feudal politics against dominant-caste conservative Tamil nationalist parties and the central Colombo establishment. He contested 2020 parliamentary elections in the Jaffna Electoral District under the banner of the United Front for People's Progress (UFPP), campaigning on land rights for displaced families, debt relief for northern fishermen, and integration of the northern Muslim community.

Senthivel has also continued frontline grassroots interventions against ongoing caste discrimination in Jaffna, including disputes regarding cemetery and cremation access in rural communities such as Kalaimathy near Puttur. Additionally, he has campaigned for the constitutional recognition and ethnic rights of the Malayaha (Upcountry) Tamils.

=== Public lectures ===
- On 5 December 1991, Senthivel delivered a memorial lecture titled "Kailasapathy's Social Outlook and Contribution" at Hettiarachchi Hall, University of Peradeniya, commemorating the 9th death anniversary of pioneering literary critic K. Kailasapathy. The event was organised by the University of Peradeniya Tamil Society and presided over by Professor S. Thillainathan.
- In July 2016, he delivered the Santasilan Kadirgamar Memorial Lecture at Trimmer Hall, Jaffna, examining the history of social stratification, untouchability, and the status of oppressed castes in northern Sri Lanka.

== Selected works ==
- In 1988, he co-authored Caste and its struggles in Sri Lanka with Dr. Nadesan Raveendran. Vekujanan (S. K. Senthivel); Iravana (N. Raveendran) (1989). Casteism and Anti-Caste Struggles in Sri Lanka (in Tamil). Chennai. (2nd updated ed., 2007 and 3rd updated ed., 2021).
- Camūkamum Manitarkaḷum Vāḻkkaiyum [Society, Human Beings and Life] (1994)
- Komiṉisṭ Kārttikēcaṉum Vaṭapula Iṭatusāri Iyakkamum [Communist Karthigesan and the Northern Left Movement] (2003)
- Senthivel, S. K. (14 October 2026). Dedicated Fighter for Equality: Memories of Comrade K.A.S. Puthiya Neethi Publication.
