= Watson Fernando =

Sri Lankan communist politician and trade unionist

Watson Fernando is a Sri Lankan communist politician and trade unionist. He served as president of the Ceylon Communist Party (Peking Wing) and was a member of the Moratuwa Municipal Council.

== Early political and labour activism ==
Fernando worked as a mercantile clerk. He rose to become a district-level leader of the Communist Party of Sri Lanka. In the first parliamentary election of 1947 he contested the Moratuwa Electoral District seat. He obtained 722 votes (2.58%). He was a leader during the Hartal of 1953. As of 1958 he served as Vice President of the All Ceylon Toddy Workers' Union (CTUF affiliate, with M.G. Mendis as President). He again contested the Morutuwa seat in the March 1960 parliamentary election, obtaining 1,091 votes (4.49%).

== Sino-Soviet split ==
Fernando became president of the Ceylon Trade Union Federation after the split in the Communist Party in 1963. He had sided with the pro-China faction in the split. In 1964 he held the post of Ratmalana District Committee secretary of the party and was one of 116 signatories to the declaration that marked the definitive split of the party into two groups.

== UF government and formation of CPSL(M-L) ==
Fernando led a split in the party in 1972. Fernando criticized the party leader N. Shanmugathasan's opposition to the United Front government, arguing that UF was a 'progressive force'. Whilst the party leader N. Shanmugathasan was abroad in Albania in April 1972, Fernando tried to seize control over the party. Fernando led a meeting on July 10 that declared N. Shanmugathasan expelled from the party. N. Shanmugathasan replied by summoning the party Central Committee on September 22, which declared Fernando expelled. Fernando's faction regrouped and at a meeting on November 12, 1972 it took the name Communist Party of Sri Lanka (Marxist-Leninist). Fernando sought to bring the Maoist movement closer to the UF orbit, but his faction remained a minor group compared to N. Shanmugathasan's party. Just like the main pro-China Communist Party, Fernando's CPSL(ML) sought to maintain contacts with the Chinese Communist Party.

== Family ==
He was married to Milna Fernando, the couple had two sons.
