= Ceylon Communist Party (Maoist) =

Ceylon Communist Party (Maoist) ලංකා කොමියුනිස්ට් පක්ෂය (මාඕවාදී) சிலோன் கம்யூனிஸ்ட் கட்சி (மாவோயிஸ்ட்)
- General Secretary: Ajith Rupasinghe Surendra (until 2017)
- Founders: N. Shanmugathasan; Premalal Kumarasiri
- Founded: 1964; 62 years ago
- Split from: Ceylon Communist Party
- Ideology: Communism; Marxism–Leninism; Mao Zedong Thought; Anti-revisionism
- Political position: Far-left
- International affiliation: RIM (defunct)
- Colors: Red

Party flag

The Ceylon Communist Party (Maoist) (CCP(M)) is a political party in Sri Lanka. It emerged in 1964 following a split within the original Ceylon Communist Party (CCP). Initially, the breakaway faction also identified itself as the "Ceylon Communist Party," leading to its informal designation as the Ceylon Communist Party (Peking Wing) due to its ideological alignment with the Communist Party of China. By the late 1960s, the party had become one of the country's principal leftist political forces. Its founding leadership included Premalal Kumarasiri and N. Shanmugathasan.

== History ==
=== Background ===
During the early 1960s, growing ideological friction between the Communist Party of the Soviet Union (CPSU) and the Chinese Communist Party (CPC) precipitated deep divisions within the Ceylon Communist Party (CCP). The party's minority tendency—rooted firmly in trade union organizing under the Ceylon Trade Union Federation (CTUF) and led by Politburo members Nagalingam Shanmugathasan and Premalal Kumarasiri—opposed the party leadership's (led by Pieter Keuneman and S. A. Wickramasinghe) accommodating stance toward Sri Lanka Freedom Party (SLFP) coalition politics.

One of the last major unified gatherings before the split occurred on 10 March 1963 in Jaffna, where leaders across both emerging tendencies convened for the CCP Northern district and youth conference sessions at the Town Hall followed by a mass rally at the Jaffna Fort grounds. Key national and regional figures in attendance included Pieter Keuneman, N. Shanmugathasan, Premalal Kumarasiri, Sarath Muttetuwegama, and W. A. Dharmadasa. At the conference proceedings, V. Ponnambalam was elected unopposed as District Secretary and K.A. Subramaniam was chosen as Youth League Secretary, while sharp ideological debates surfaced over the Sino-Soviet dispute and future party strategy.

In June 1963, K. A. Subramaniam and D. B. Alwis signed an agreement with the All-China Youth Federation on behalf of the Ceylon Federation of Communist and Progressive Youth Leagues, establishing cooperation between the two organisations. During their 1963 visit to the People's Republic of China, they met Chen Yi, China's Vice Premier and Foreign Minister.

=== Initial organising committee ===
On 17 November 1963, the party formed an organising committee comprising:

- Premalal Kumarasiri
- N. Sanmugathasan
- D. N. Nadunge
- D. K. D. Jinendrapala
- Higgoda Dharmasena
- K. Manickavasagar
- N. L. Perera
- K. Wimalapala
- K. Kulaveerasingham
- W. S. de Siriwardene
- A. D. Charleshamy
- Watson Fernando
- W. A. Dharmadasa
- S. M. Wickremasinghe
- A. Jayasuriya
- D. A. Gunasekera
- Cyril Kulatunge
- Victor Silva
- K. A. Subramaniam
- Susima
- K. V. Krishnakutty
- S. Janapriya
- Kanti Abeyasekere
- E. T. Moorthy
- Dharmadasa Jayakoddy
- H. G. A. de Silva
- S. M. P. de Silva
- H. M. P. Mohideen
- D. M. J. Abeyagunewardene
- O. A. Ramiah
- D. B. Alwis
- C. S. Manohar
- S. Sivadasan
- Samarasiri de Silva
- P. Wijayatileke

=== Founding ===
The Ceylon Communist Party (Maoist) (CCP(M)) was formally established in 1964. Later that year, Premalal Kumarasiri, representing the CCP(M), welcomed Zhou Enlai (the first Premier of the People's Republic of China) during Zhou's official visit to Sri Lanka.

=== Early years and first splits ===
In 1964, Rohana Wijeweera joined the CCP(M) as a functionary but grew disillusioned with the party's perceived lack of revolutionary zeal. On 14 May 1965, he founded the Janatha Vimukthi Peramuna (JVP) after mobilising like-minded youth. Around the same time, the Peradiga Sulanga (Broad Wind) faction, led by Gamini Yapa, also split from the CCP(M).

Later in 1965, W. A. Dharmadasa rejoined the original Ceylon Communist Party (CCP), having previously worked to expand the CCP(M)'s influence in Tamil-speaking regions.

=== Representation in Parliament ===
From 1965 to 1970, S. D. Bandaranayake represented the CCP(M)'s views in Parliament. He vocally supported anti-caste struggles in northern Sri Lanka, visiting the region alongside N. Sanmugathasan and K. A. Subramaniam to express solidarity with marginalised communities.

In 1966, Bandaranayake raised parliamentary questions about a banned protest procession against caste oppression in Chunnakam on 21 October 1966. The CCP(M) defied the police ban, leading to a violent crackdown in which numerous cadres sustained severe injuries.

On 1 May 1969, S. D. Bandaranayake, D. K. D. Jinendrapala, and Watson Fernando were arrested in Colombo after the United National Party (UNP) government outlawed May Day rallies. Simultaneously, CCP(M) leaders in Jaffna, including K. A. Subramaniam (who required months of recuperation at N. Sanmugathasan's residence), were brutally assaulted by police. Bandaranayake later challenged these actions in Parliament.

=== 1970s ===
In 1972, some cadres criticised party leader N. Shanmugathasan's opposition to the United Front (UF) government, arguing that the UF represented a "progressive force". While Shanmugathasan was abroad in Albania in April 1972, a group consisting of D. N. Nadunge, Watson Fernando, E. T. Moorthy, D. A. Gunasekara, and V.A. Kandasamy attempted to seize control of the party. This faction later regrouped and, at a meeting held on 12 November 1972, adopted the name Communist Party of Sri Lanka (Marxist-Leninist). They sought to align the Maoist movement more closely with the UF, although this group remained relatively minor in comparison to Shanmugathasan's Ceylon Communist Party (Maoist), which continued to receive strong support from Samal De Silva, Kanti Abeyasekere, and K.A. Subramaniam.

Following the death of Mao Zedong and the ascendancy of Deng Xiaoping in China, the party firmly denounced the new direction taken by the Chinese leadership. In 1978, under Shanmugathasan's leadership, the party issued a public statement defying the Central Committee’s decision by rejecting the Three Worlds Theory and refusing to endorse the right to Tamil self-determination. This stance resulted in a split, as proponents of Tamil self-determination and supporters of the Three Worlds Theory—including Samal De Silva, K. A. Subramaniam, S. K. Senthivel, and S. D. Bandaranayake—left the party and established a new political organisation, the Communist Party of Sri Lanka (Left).

=== 1980s onwards ===
The party reorganised itself internationally among those who reaffirmed Maoism, becoming one of the signatories to the founding declaration of the Revolutionary Internationalist Movement.

In 1991, a conference was held which reconstituted the party as the Ceylon Communist Party (Maoist). N. Shanmugathasan continued to lead the party until his death in 1993.

Following Shanmugathasan's demise, Ajith Rupasinghe Surendra assumed leadership of the party. Under his guidance, the Ceylon Communist Party (Maoist) maintained its ideological stance and continued its political activities until his death in 2017.

== International affiliations ==
The party maintained strong ties with China during the era of Mao Zedong. Following the onset of the Naxalite insurgency in India, the CCP supported the CPI (M-L) by serving as a liaison between the Naxalites and the Chinese leadership.

Ajith Rupasinghe Surendra was affiliated with the pro-democracy factions involved in the Nepalese Civil War. The party was also a member of the now-defunct Revolutionary Internationalist Movement.

== See also ==
- Communist Party of Sri Lanka
- Communist Party of India (Maoist)
- Left Liberation Front
- People's Liberation Army, Nepal
- List of anti-revisionist groups
