= Ceylon Federation of Labour =

The Ceylon Federation of Labour (CFL) is an organisation bringing together trade unions in the private, semi-government and co-operative sectors of Sri Lanka.

== History ==
The Ceylon Federation of Labour was registered as a federation of unions by the Workers & Peasants Union, which was led by the Radical Party under the influence of the ideas of M.N. Roy of India. When the Lanka Sama Samaja Party re-commenced its trade union activity in the post-WWII period, it did so in co-operation with the Workers & Peasants Union and gradually took over leadership of the CFL by 1946.

The CFL was involved in the general strike of 1946 and its successor of 1947. It was the prime mover in the hartal (strike) of 1953.

== Affiliated unions ==
- All Ceylon Commercial and Industrial Workers' Union (ACCIWU)
- All Ceylon Oil Workers’ Union (ACOWU)
- All Ceylon United Motor Workers' Union (ACUMWU)
- Lanka Estate Workers' Union (LEWU)
- Lanka Hotel Employees Union (LHEU)
- United Corporations and Mercantile Union (UCMU)
- United Port Workers Union (UPWU)

== Notable leaders ==
- N.M. Perera
- Colvin R de Silva
