= New Democratic Marxist–Leninist Party =

New Democratic Marxist–Leninist Party නව-ප්‍රජාතන්ත්‍රවාදී මාක්ස්-ලෙනින්වාදී පක්ෂය புதிய-ஜனநாயக மார்க்சிச-லெனினிச கட்சி
- General Secretary: S. K. Senthivel
- Founders: K. A. Subramaniam; Samal De Silva
- Founded: 3 July 1978
- Split from: Ceylon Communist Party-Peking Wing
- Ideology: Communism; Marxism–Leninism; Mao Zedong Thought; Anti-revisionism
- Political position: Far-left
- National affiliation: People's Struggle Alliance
- International affiliation: ICOR
- Colors: Red, Yellow

Election symbol
- Kettle

Website
- ndmlp.net

The New Democratic Marxist–Leninist Party (Sinhala: නව-ප්‍රජාතන්ත්‍රවාදී මාක්ස්-ලෙනින්වාදී පක්ෂය, Nava-Prajathanthravadi Maks-Leninvadi Pakshaya; Tamil: புதிய-ஜனநாயக மார்க்சிச-லெனினிச கட்சி) is a Marxist-Leninist and Maoist party in Sri Lanka. The party emerged in 1978 following a split in the Ceylon Communist Party (Maoist). The party was initially known as the Ceylon Communist Party (Left). The founding general secretary was K. A. Subramaniam, the current is S. K. Senthivel.

== History ==
=== Background ===
In June 1963, K. A. Subramaniam and D. B. Alwis signed an agreement with All-China Youth Federation on behalf of the Ceylon Federation of Communist and Progressive Youth Leagues for cooperation between the two organizations. They met China's vice premier and foreign minister Chen Yi (marshal) during this trip to the People's Republic of China in 1963. Since 1964, when several hundreds of members and carders who had joined the Ceylon Communist Party (Maoist) because it was a revolutionary party became dissatisfied with the party leadership and began to quit the party and became isolated individuals or joined other parties. K.A. Subramaniam joined the others who decided to stay in the party and were confident that they could build up the party anew, on the correct lines.

Samal De Silva and others who continued to stay in the party which had N. Sanmugathasan as its General Secretary, were forced to change their position in 1978, at a special party conference which was summoned in the middle of 1978, though a full report incorporating correct ideological, political and organisational standpoints was presented under the leadership of K.A. Subramaniam and debated, the report was not accepted and arbitrary decisions were taken. In this background, party members who had assembled from various parts of Sri Lanka decided to form a separate party. K.A. Subramaniam accepted the proposal with much reluctance and came forward to implement it resolutely.

=== Founding and later history ===
In 1978, Ceylon Communist Party (Maoist), led by N. Sanmugathasan, issued a public statement in defiance of the decision of the central committee not to accept the decision of the Tamils self-determination and reject the Three Worlds Theory, many including Samal De Silva, K.A. Subramaniam, S.K. Senthivel left the party and formed a new political party. On 3 July 1978 a Conference of Party members was held. At that conference it was resolved that the new party should be named Communist Party of Sri Lanka (Left), and till a party congress was held, and an interim organising committee was chosen by the conference, he was elected secretary of the committee. K.A. Subramaniam deployed all his skills to build up the party as a strong organisation and to make it take root among the working people.

Communist Party of Sri Lanka (Left) changed its name to the New Democratic Party in 1991, and after that to New-Democratic Marxist-Leninist Party at its 5th All Ceylon Conference held in Colombo in June 2010. Currently S.K. Senthivel is the general secretary, and internationally the party is affiliated with ICOR.

== See also ==
- Communist Party of Sri Lanka
- Communist Party of Sri Lanka (Marxist-Leninist)
- List of anti-revisionist groups
