= Lanka Sama Samaja Party (Alternative Group) =

Lanka Equal Society Party (Alternative Group) Lanka Sama Samaja Party (Alternative Group)
- Leader: Chandra Kumarage
- Split from: Lanka Sama Samaja Party
- Ideology: Communism; Marxism-Leninism; Trotskyism
- National affiliation: Left Liberation Front
- International affiliation: Fourth International
- Colors: Red

Lanka Sama Samaja Party (Alternative Group) is a Trotskyist political party in Sri Lanka, led by Chandra Kumarage. The party was formed following a split in the Lanka Sama Samaja Party. The party followed the same ideologies as any other Samasamaj Party. The party was affiliated with the Fourth International

LSSP(AG) is a constituent of the New Left Front.
