= Nagalingam Shanmugathasan =

Sri Lanka Trade Unionist

- நாகலிங்கம் சண்முகதாசன் නාගලිංගම් ෂන්මුගදාසන්

Personal details
- Born: 2 May 1920 Manipay, British Ceylon
- Died: 8 February 1993 (aged 72) London, England
- Party: Ceylon Communist Party (until 1964); Ceylon Communist Party (Peking Wing) (from 1964)
- Spouse: Parameswari
- Children: Dr. Radha Thambirajah
- Education: Colombo University College
- Occupation: Trade Unionist

Nagalingam Shanmugathasan (Tamil: நாகலிங்கம் சண்முகதாசன், 1920 – 8 February 1993) was a trade unionist and Maoist revolutionary leader in Sri Lanka. He was the General Secretary of the Ceylon Communist Party (Maoist)

== Early life and family ==
Shanmugathasan hailed from a family of modest means in the town of Manipay in Jaffna District. He began studying history at the University College Colombo in 1938, where he first came into contact with communist ideas and met supporters of the Communist Party of Great Britain who had returned from studying at Cambridge University. In 1939 he and two fellow students were suspended, but soon reinstated, from the university for distributing anti-imperialist flyers after the outbreak of World War II. Shanmugathasan gained notoriety among the students after this action and in 1940 won in the student election to become General Secretary of the University Union Society. The next year he was elected President of the Society. In the meantime, he was organizing a group of Communists among the students that opposed both British imperialism and the Trotskyists of the Lanka Sama Samaja Party.

After graduating from the University of Ceylon in 1943, Shanmugathasan joined the trade union movement, and became a full-time activist of the Ceylon Communist Party. He became the head of the Ceylon Trade Union Federation and led several strikes, including the general strike of 1947, the Hartal (general strike) of 1953, and a transport strike in 1955.

Shanmugathasan married with Parameswari, the widow wife of veteran Communist leader Hon. Pon Kandiah. Also Shanmugathasan adopted Hon. Pon Kandiah's daughter – Dr. Radha Thambirajah. She is a lecturer of Acupuncture in Europe .

== Anti-Soviet and pro-Chinese stand ==
In the aftermath of the Soviet-Chinese split of the Communist movement, he and Premalal Kumarasiri were expelled from the Ceylon Communist Party's Politburo in 1963 for pro-Mao views, and they formed a new Party with the same name as Ceylon Communist Party. In 1964 he became the general secretary of the Ceylon Communist Party (Peking Wing) (later CCP(Maoist)). He contested the 1965 general election as a Communist Party (Peking Wing) candidate but was unsuccessful, winning only 0.5% of the vote. The party at its ninth Congress held in 1969 upheld Marxism-Leninism-Mao Zedong Thought and the Great Proletarian Cultural Revolution. Shanmugathasan visited China twice during the Cultural Revolution and was important enough to have addressed thousands of Red Guards.

After the formation of the Communist Party of India (Marxist-Leninist), which conducted armed struggle with the Communist Party of India (Maoist) as a part of the Naxalite Insurgency, Shanmugathasan played the role of liaison between China and CPI(ML).

In 1971 Shanmugathasan was imprisoned for one year during a crackdown on revolutionaries following the Janatha Vimukthi Peramuna (People's Liberation Front) rebellion. Shanmugathasan was targeted by the government for his espousal of armed revolution for political change and for being identified as one of the political mentors of Rohana Wijeweera, the founding leader of the JVP. While detained in prison Shanmugathasan authored a book, A Marxist Looks at the History of Ceylon.

In 1973, Shanmugathasan's party was estimated by the US State Department to have approximately 500 to 800 cadre, and possessed "the ability to control the Ceylon Trade Union Federation and the Ceylon Plantation Workers' Union with a combined membership of some 110,000".

== Anti-Chinese stand ==
In 1976, after the death of Mao Zedong and the defeat of the Gang of Four and the revolutionary pro-Mao forces in China, Shanmugathasan sided with the pro-Mao forces internationally. He played an important role in the foundation of the Revolutionary Internationalist Movement, which he hailed as a "milestone in the history of the international communist movement". In 1991 he convened a conference of the Communist Party of Ceylon (Maoist) to promote new leadership and assure the longevity of the party.

== Political mentor ==
Sri Lankan former President Maithripala Sirisena commenced his political career under Shanmugathasan in the Ceylon Communist Party (Maoist).

S. K. Senthivel the General Secretary of the New-Democratic Marxist-Leninist Party has started his full time political career under Shanmugathasan in 1964 and worked closely with him till 1978.

In 1965, Rohana Wijeweera learned from Shanmugathasan to lead the revolutionary faction of the Ceylon Communist Party (Maoist). Later he formed the Janatha Vimukthi Peramuna or JVP.

== Stand on Tamil Nationalism ==
Shanmugathasan was one of few national level politicians of Sri Lankan Tamil origin. He did not accept the Tamil Nationalism and the decision of the Tamils self-determination till 1983, when the Civil War broke out. After the anti-Tamil holocaust of July 1983 Shanmugathasan began publicly endorsing the Tamil militant struggle for self-determination.

In his 1989 political memoir, he stated:

The winning of the right of self-determination for the Tamil people is part of Sri Lanka‘s democratic revolution which must bring together the revolutionary from among both the Sinhalese and Tamils, particularly, the workers, peasants and radical intelligentsia - irrespective of language, caste or creed.

== Final days ==
His last public appearance was at the first press conference of the International Emergency Committee to Defend the Life of Dr Abimael Guzmán in London. He died of natural causes on 8 February 1993 in England, where he had gone for medical treatment near the end of his life.

== Works ==
Political Memoirs of an Unrepentant Communist by N. Shanmugathasan, published 1989

This is a partial list of books and articles written by Shanmugathasan.

- A Marxist Looks at the History of Ceylon, 1974, Colombo: Sarasavi Printers
- The Bright Red Banner of Mao Tse-tung Thought, 1969, Colombo: Communist Party Publications, written to commemorate the twentieth anniversary of the founding of the People's Republic of China (excerpt from Chapter IV)
- "Castro Joins Anti-China Chorus," Peking Review, Vol. 9, No. 9, 25 February 1966
- Enver Hoxha Refuted, originally published in A World to Win magazine
- How Can the Working Class Achieve Power? A Selection of Articles of Interest to the Working Class Movement, 1963, Colombo: Worker Publications
- The Lessons of the October Revolution, 1964, Colombo: Workers' Pub. House
- "N. Sanmugathasan on Indonesian Revolution," Peking Review, Vol. 9, #37, 9 September 1966
- "Nurtured by Mao Tse-tung’s Thought, China Grows Young," Peking Review, Vol. 9, #46, 11 November 1966
- Political Memoirs of an Unrepentant Communist, 1989, Colombo (excerpts online)
- "Sri Lanka's Week of Shame: an eyewitness account," Race & Class, A Journal for Black & Third World Liberation, Volume XXVI, Summer 1984, No. 1: Sri Lanka: Racism and the Authoritarian State
- Some Notes on Mao's Philosophy, 1986
- "Tremendous International Significance of Mao Tse-tung’s Thought," Peking Review, Vol. 11, No. 43, 25 October 1968, pp. 22–23
