= United Front (Sri Lanka) =

Left-wing political alliance in Sri Lanka from 1968 to 1977

United Front සමගි පෙරමුණ
- Abbreviation: UF
- Founder: Sirimavo Bandaranaike
- Founded: 1968
- Dissolved: 1977
- Preceded by: United Left Front
- Ideology: Big tent Factions: Communism; Anti-imperialism; Sinhalese nationalism Social democracy
- Political position: Left-wing
- Members parties: Sri Lanka Freedom Party; Lanka Sama Samaja Party; Communist Party of Sri Lanka

The United Front (Sinhala: සමගි පෙරමුණ, romanized: Samagi Peramuna) was a political alliance in Sri Lanka, formed by the Sri Lanka Freedom Party (SLFP), the Lanka Sama Samaja Party (LSSP) and the Communist Party of Sri Lanka (CPSL) in 1968. It came to power in the 1970 general election.

It was conceived by the LSSP as a front of the working class - represented by itself and the CPSL - with the petty bourgeoisie - represented by the SLFP - and by the CPSL as a front of progressive forces.

== Goals ==
The United Front predominantly aimed at the complete decolonization of Sri Lanka.

=== International support ===
The United Front was heavily anti-British and pro-Soviet as completely opposed to the foreign policy of the United National Party. The UF was supported by the Soviet Union in order to decolonize the island. The pro-dominion UNP criticized this. The UNP that had a majority of Christians wanted to rebel against it.

== Electoral history ==
Sri Lanka Parliamentary Elections
Election year	Votes	Vote %	Seats won	+/–	Result for the party
1970	2,442,402	48.93%	116 / 151	▲116	Government
