= List of assassinations of the Second JVP Insurrection =

The following is a list of notable assassinations of the Second JVP Insurrection, most of which were carried out by the Janatha Vimukthi Peramuna or by government security forces.

== Politicians ==
Victim	Position	Date	Location	Method	Perpetrator(s)
Jinadasa Weerasinghe	UNP MP (Tangalle)	31 July 1987	Angunakolapelessa	Shot	JVP is blamed.
Keerthisena Abeywickrama	UNP MP (Deniyaya)	18 August 1987	Parliament of Sri Lanka, Sri Jayawardenapura Kotte	Bombing	JVP is blamed.
Harsha Abeywardena	Chairman, UNP	23 December 1987	Wellawatte	Shot	JVP is blamed.
Daya Sepali Senadheera	UNP MP (Karandeniya)	1988			JVP is blamed.
Vijaya Kumaratunga	Founder of Sri Lanka Mahajana Party and actor	16 February 1988	Colombo	Shot	JVP is blamed.
G. V. S. de Silva	District Minister for Galle; UNP MP (Habaraduwa)	1 May 1988	Galle		JVP is blamed.
Nandalal Fernando	General Secretary, UNP	20 May 1988	Wellawatte		JVP is blamed.
S. B. Yalegama	Former SLFP MP (Rattota) & USA candidate	28 May 1988/ 25 August 1988?	Matale		JVP is blamed.
L.W. Panditha	CPSL member and trade unionist	27 July 1988	Dematagoda, Colombo District		JVP is blamed.
Lionel Jayatilake	Minister & UNP MP (Kuliyapitiya)	26 September 1988	Kuliyapitiya	Shot	JVP is blamed.
Indrapala Abeyweera	SLFP Deputy General Secretary	10 January 1989		Shot	JVP is blamed.
P.D. Wimalsena	LSSP member and trade unionist	15 May 1989			JVP is blamed.
Merrill Kariyawasam	UNP MP (Agalawatta)	September 1989			JVP is blamed.
O. Kariyawasam	Liberal candidate	26 October 1989	Wattala, Gampaha District		JVP is blamed.
W.M.P.G. Banda	UNP MP (Galagedara)				JVP is blamed.
Lesley Ranagala	UNP MP (Borella)			Shot	JVP is blamed.

== JVP leaders ==
Victim	Position	Date	Location	Method	Perpetrator(s)
Rohana Wijeweera	Leader of the Janatha Vimukthi Peramuna	13 November 1989	Borella	Shot	Government Forces are blamed.
Upatissa Gamanayake	Deputy leader of the Janatha Vimukthi Peramuna	13 November 1989			Government Forces are blamed.
Saman Piyasiri Fernando	Military wing leader of the Janatha Vimukthi Peramuna	29 December 1989			Government Forces are blamed.

== Journalists ==
Victim	Position	Date	Location	Method	Perpetrator(s)
Thevis Guruge	Chairman, ITN & broadcaster, Radio Ceylon	23 July 1989			JVP is blamed.
Premakeerthi de Alwis	Broadcaster	31 July 1989	Colombo	Shot	JVP is blamed.
K. Amaratunge	Chief News Editor, Rupavahini	13 August 1989			JVP is blamed.
Sagarika Gomes	Broadcaster, Rupavahini	13 September 1989			JVP is blamed.
Richard de Zoysa	Journalist, author, human rights activist and actor	18 February 1990	Moratuwa	Shot	Pro-government paramilitary squads are blamed.

== Academics ==
Victim	Position	Date	Location	Method	Perpetrator(s)
Professor Stanley Wijesundera	Vice Chancellor, University of Colombo	8 March 1989	Colombo	Gunshot	JVP is blamed.
Professor Chandratne Patuwathavithane	Vice Chancellor, University of Moratuwa				JVP is blamed.
Captain T.E. Nagahawatte	Assistant Registrar, University of Peradeniya	October 1989	Peradeniya	Gunshot	JVP is blamed.

== Professionals ==
Victim	Position	Date	Location	Method	Perpetrator(s)
D. C. Athukorale	Chief Engineer, Colombo Port Authority	17 November 1988	Welikada	Gunshot	JVP is blamed.
E. Liayana Pathirana	Working Director, Salt Corporation	22 June 1989	Opanayake	Gunshot	JVP is blamed.
Wijedasa Liyanarachchi	Lawyer	2 September 1989	General Hospital, Colombo	Multiple injuries resulting from torture	Sri Lanka Police is blamed.
Dr Gladys Jayawardene	Chairperson, State Pharmaceuticals Corporation	12 September 1989	Slave Island, Colombo	Gunshot	JVP is blamed.
Neville Nissanka	Lawyer	3 October 1989	Miriswatta, Gampaha	Gunshot	PRRA is blamed.

== Police and Military officers ==
Victim	Position	Date	Location	Method	Perpetrator(s)
Terrence Perera	Deputy Inspector General of Police, Director - Counter Subversive Division	12 December 1987	Battaramulla	Shot	JVP is blamed.
Bennet Perera	Deputy Inspector General of Police, Director, Criminal Investigation Department	1 May 1989	Mount Lavinia	Shot	JVP is blamed.

== Activists ==
Victim	Position	Date	Location	Method	Perpetrator(s)
Daya Pathirana	Leader, Independent Students Union, University of Colombo	15 December 1986	Near Bolgoda Lake, Piliyandala	Cut-throat	JVP led Inter University Students' Federation (IUSF) is blamed.
Padmasiri Thrimavitharana	Medical student and prominent student activist	22 October 1988	Rathnapura	Multiple injuries resulting from torture	Pro-government paramilitary squads are blamed.
Nandathilaka Galappaththi	Education Secretary and Political Secretary of Janatha Vimukthi Peramuna	10 September 1989	Mattegoda	Multiple injuries resulting from torture	Paramilitary squads are blamed.
P. R. B. Wimalarathna	Teacher and the leader of the National Center for Workers' Struggle.	19 September 1989	Borella	Multiple injuries resulting from torture	Paramilitary squads are blamed.

The number of activists killed exceeded 13,000 as the following quote from Barbara Harff, professor of political science emerita at the U.S. Naval Academy in Annapolis, Maryland showed:

“And on the democratic side, Sri Lanka is one clear case of a democratic regime that in 1989–90 authorized military squads to track down and summarily execute members and suspected supporters of the JVP (Peoples Liberation Party), which had begun its second rebellion that threatened to overthrow the state. Between 13,000 and 30,000 were killed in this politicide...”

== See also ==
- List of assassinations of the Sri Lankan Civil War
- 1987 grenade attack in the Sri Lankan Parliament
- 1989 Temple of the Tooth attack
