= List of people assassinated by the Janatha Vimukthi Peramuna =

This is a list of notable people assassinated by the Janatha Vimukthi Peramuna (JVP). JVP is a Sri Lankan Marxist-Leninist, communist party which was involved in two armed uprisings against the ruling governments in 1971 (SLFP) and 1987–89 (UNP). Later it entered democratic politics by participating in the 1994 parliamentary election

== 1971 JVP Insurrection ==
- Rex De Costa - Former commanding officer of the Ruhunu Regiment and a medical doctor in the Ceylon Defence Force during World War II, former Vice President of the World Veterans Federation
- Noel Weerakoon, CA - RMA Sandhurst and Ceylon Army cricketer

== 1987–89 JVP Insurrection ==
- K. Gunaratnam - businessman and movie director
- Amara Wellappuli - Attorney-At-Law
- Anura Daniel - United National Party MP for Kandy
- Chandratne Patuwathavithane - Academic & Former vice chancellor of University of Moratuwa
- D. C. Atukorala - A Chief Engineer attached to the Ports Authority, Sri Lanka
- Daya Pathirana - Former leader of the Independent Students Union (ISU) of University of Colombo
- Daya Sepali Senadheera - United National Party MP for Karandeniya
- DIG Bennet Perera - Former Director Criminal Investigation Department of Sri Lanka.
- DIG Terrence Perera - Former director of the counter subversive division, Sri Lanka Police
- Esmie Amarasiri - Wife of M. S. Amarasiri, former Chief Minister, Southern Provincial Council, Sri Lanka
- G. V. S. de Silva - Former district minister and United National Party MP for Habaraduwa
- Gamini Medagedera - attorney at law, English teacher and secretary of Sri Lanka communist party polonnaruwa
- Gladys Jayawardene - Former Chairman of State Pharmaceutical Corporation of Sri Lanka.
- Harsha Abeywardena - Former chairman of the United National Party
- Jinadasa Weerasinghe - United National Party MP for Tangalle
- K. Amaratunge - Chief News Editor, Sri Lanka Rupavahini Corporation
- L. W. Panditha - Member of Sri Lankan communist Party and Trade unionist
- Lesley Ranagala - United National Party MP for Borella
- Leslie Yatanwala - Attorney-At-Law
- Lionel Jayatilake - Former minister and United National Party MP
- Merrill Kariyawasam - United National Party MP for Agalawatte
- Nandalal Fernando Former General Secretary of United National Party
- Premakeerthi de Alwis- Famous Sri Lankan radio and television broadcaster and lyricist.
- Rev. Fr. Michael Paul Rodrigo, OMI - Catholic priest
- Sagarika Gomes - Artist and TV newscaster.
- Stanley Wijesundera - Sri Lankan academic and a Professor of Chemistry, the first Vice Chancellor of the University of Colombo and formerly the Chairman of the Association of Commonwealth Universities
- Thevis Guruge - Distinguished broadcaster with Radio Ceylon and subsequently the Sri Lanka Broadcasting Corporation. First Sinhala Announcer of the Radio Ceylon
- Ven. Kotikawatte Saddhatissa Thera - Famous Buddhist monk
- Ven. Pohaddaramulle Premaloka Thero - Buddhist monk
- Vijaya Kumaranatunga (Note: Other sources blame Kumaranatunga's assassination on the Government.) - Popular Sri Lankan film actor and politician, founder of Sri Lanka Mahajana Party (SLMP)
- W. M. G. T. Banda - Former Minister of Buddhist Affairs and United National Party MP for Galagedara
