= List of attacks on civilians attributed to the Janatha Vimukthi Peramuna =

The following is a list of notable attacks on civilians attributed to the Janatha Vimukthi Peramuna (JVP), a Sri Lankan Marxist-Leninist, communist group.

== Attacks in chronological order ==
Attack	Date	Location	District	Province	Death toll	Refs
Assassination of Rex De Costa	9 April 1971	Deniyaya	Matara	Southern	1	
Assassination of Daya Pathirana	15 December 1986	Piliyandala	Colombo	Western	1	
Grenade attack on Parliament	18 August 1987	Sri Jayawardenepura Kotte	Colombo	Western	2	
Assassination of Harsha Abeywardena	23 December 1987	Wellawatte, Colombo	Colombo	Western	4	
Assassination of Vijaya Kumaranatunga	16 February 1988	Colombo	Colombo	Western	2	
Kathiresan temple bombing	16 February 1988	Bambalapitiya, Colombo	Colombo	Western	10+	
Udugampola family massacre	24 July 1988	Poddala	Galle	Southern	5	
Grandpass rally attack	17 October 1988	Grandpass, Colombo	Colombo	Western	3	
Kadawatte rally attack	2 December 1988	Kadawatte	Colombo	Western	4	
Poojapiya massacre	25 January 1989	Poojapiya, Katugastota	Kandy	Central	6	
Temple of the Tooth attack	8 February 1989	Kandy	Kandy	Central	2-5	
Assassination of Stanley Wijesundera	8 March 1989	Colombo	Colombo	Western	1	
Kataragama bombing	July 1989	Kataragama	Moneragala	Uva	15	
Assassination of Thevis Guruge	23 July 1989				1	
Assassination of Premakeerthi de Alwis	31 July 1989	Colombo	Colombo	Western	1	
Assassination of Chandratne Patuwathavithane	14 September 1989				1	

== See also ==
- List of attacks attributed to the LTTE
- List of attacks on civilians attributed to Sri Lankan government forces
