= 1989 Kandy massacre =

Attacks on villages in Sri Lanka

- Part of the 1987–1989 JVP insurrection
- Location: 7°18′N 80°42′E; Kandy District, Sri Lanka
- Date: 14 September 1989
- Target: Civilians, potential JVP sympathisers
- Deaths: 100+
- Perpetrators: Eagles of the Central Hills; Sri Lankan Armed Forces (allegedly); Sri Lanka Police (allegedly)

The 1989 Kandy massacre was a series of retaliatory attacks on the villages of Menikhinna, Arangala, Mahawatta, and Kundasale in the Kandy District of the Central Province, Sri Lanka during the 1987–1989 JVP insurrection. While the massacre was officially attributed to an anti-communist paramilitary group known as the Eagles of the Central Hills, other reports and eyewitness accounts claim that it was a joint operation conducted by the army and police. It was one of the largest single incidents reported to Amnesty International during the JVP insurrection.

== Background ==
Since 1987, the Sinhalese Marxist–Leninist Janatha Vimukthi Peramuna (JVP) had been engaged in a low-intensity conflict with the Sri Lankan government in response to the presence of the Indian Peacekeeping Force (IPKF) in the country amidst the Sri Lankan Civil War. The JVP garnered much sympathy from impoverished Sinhalese and university students, especially among young to middle-aged men. In response, the army and police, operating both on-duty and off-duty as vigilante groups, would arrest, torture, and kill people suspected of being sympathetic to the JVP. When the JVP killed servicemen or their families, vigilante squads, made up of off-duty policemen and soldiers, would kill JVP members and/or supporters in retaliation.

== Incident ==
In Kundasale on 13 September 1989, the JVP allegedly killed sixteen family members of three security forces personnel.

The following night, armed men in uniform set fire to a number of residential dwellings in Menikhinna, killing approximately 52 people. The Menikhinna area was a stronghold of members of the Bathgama caste, who were known to be supporters of the JVP. The armed group then moved onto the villages of Kundasale and Aranagala, where they killed a further 30 people. Residents of Kandy found over 100 bodies floating in the river, and it was suspected that there were at least 50 additional deaths. It is believed that the killers were pro-government vigilantes seeking revenge for the earlier murders. Amnesty International later estimated that over 100 villagers were killed.

== See also ==
- List of attacks on civilians attributed to Sri Lankan government forces
