= Office on Missing Persons =

Sri Lankan government department

Office on Missing Persons (OMP)-Sri Lanka
Agency overview
- Formed: 15 September 2017; 9 years ago
- Jurisdiction: Sri Lanka
- Headquarters: No. 40, Level 03, Buthgamuwa Road, Rajagiriya, Colombo District, Sri Lanka
- Annual budget: Rs 1.3 Billion (2018)
- Agency executive: Mahesh Katulanda, Chairman (From 2021)
- Parent department: Ministry of Justice, Prison Affairs and Constitutional Reforms
- Key documents: Office on Missing Persons (Establishment, Administration And Discharge Of Functions) Act, No. 14 of 2016; Office on Missing Persons (Establishment, Administration And Discharge Of Functions) (Amendment) Act, No. 9 of 2017
- Website: www.omp.gov.lk

The Office on Missing Persons (OMP)' is a Sri Lankan government department tasked with bringing closure to suffering victims and their relatives by determining the status of all missing persons in Sri Lanka. It is the first pillar of four "Transitional Justice mechanisms" proposed by the Sirisena–Wickremesinghe administration in the aftermath of the Sri Lankan Civil War. The Office On Missing Persons (Establishment, Administration And Discharge Of Functions) Act, No. 14 of 2016 provides for:

"...the establishment of the office on missing persons; to provide for the searching and tracing of missing persons; to provide assistance to relatives of missing persons; for the setting up of a database of missing persons; for setting out the procedures and guidelines applicable to the powers and functions assigned to the said office; and to provide for all matters which are connected with or incidental to, the implementation of the provisions of this act.

Anywhere between 16,000 and 20,000 people are thought to be missing in Sri Lanka.

== Background ==
After the end of the Sri Lankan Civil War, recommendations of the Lessons Learnt and Reconciliation Commission (LLRC) (December 2011), included investigations into the disappearances and abductions of persons to ensure accountability and responsibility on them. The Presidential Commission of Inquiry Into Complaints of Abductions and Disappearances (August 2015), also known as the Paranagama Commission, after its head Maxwell Paranagama, investigating missing persons Sri Lanka, found close to 19,000 persons confirmed to have gone missing during the Sri Lankan Civil War. 23,586 complaints were received including approximately 5,000 from families of security forces personals. A United Nations Working Group on Enforced or Involuntary Disappearances, during the period from 1980 to 2010 related to the 1987–1989 JVP insurrection and Sri Lankan Civil War, recorded 12,000 cases of enforced disappearances.

== History ==
The government first introduced a bill to establish the Office on Missing Persons (OMP) on the 22 May 2016. The Office was established 15 September 2017, and operations commenced on 28 February 2018 with the appointment of members to the commission. The office's first step will be to investigate missing persons in conflict affected areas of the North and East of the country including victims, civilians and members of the armed forces and the police. As of March 2018 13,294 completed applications (Feedback Data Sheet) have been submitted island-wide. A database has also been developed to maintain records of missing persons.

== Operations ==
=== Scope ===
In the context of the office, a missing person is defined as "one whose fate or whereabouts are reasonably believed to be unknown". Such as the following:

- 1. "in the course of, consequent to, or in connection with the conflict which took place in the Northern and Eastern Provinces or its aftermath, or is a member of the armed forces or police who is identified as “missing in action”; or
- 2. in connection with political unrest or civil disturbances (such as the youth insurrections of 1971 or 1987–1989 JVP insurrection); or
- 3. as an enforced disappearance as defined in the “International Convention for the Protection of All Persons from Enforced Disappearance”;"

This definition applies to all people in all regions of Sri Lanka regardless of ethnicity or religion.

=== Commission ===
There are 7 members of the commission who are appointed for a term of 3 years. Each member can only serve a maximum of two terms. All commissioners are nominated and approved by the Constitutional Council and are appointed by the president. The commissioners are to not only be qualified professionals on human rights, humanitarian Laws and with investigative skills but also representative of the Sri Lankan society as a whole.

2018-2021

Member	Position	Joined Council	Term expires	Appointed by	Notes
Saliya Pieris PC	Chairman	28 February 2018	28 February 2021	Maithripala Sirisena	Human rights and constitutional Lawyer
Jayatheepa Punniyamoorthy	Commissioner	28 February 2018	28 February 2021	Maithripala Sirisena	Women's rights activist
Mohanti Antonette Peiris	Commissioner	28 February 2018	28 February 2021	Maithripala Sirisena	Major General (Rtd.)
Nimalka Fernando	Commissioner	28 February 2018	28 February 2021	Maithripala Sirisena	Lawyer, human rights activist
Mirak Raheem	Commissioner	28 February 2018	28 February 2021	Maithripala Sirisena	Human rights researcher
Somasiri Liyanage	Commissioner	28 February 2018	28 February 2021	Maithripala Sirisena	Lawyer
Kanapathipillai Venthan	Commissioner	28 February 2018	28 February 2021	Maithripala Sirisena	Human rights activist

2021-

Member	Position	Joined Council	Term expires	Appointed by	Notes
Mahesh Katulanda	Chairman	May 2021		Gotabaya Rajapaksa	Senior Attorney-at-Law
Wijekone Bandara Ganegala	Member of the Board	May 2021		Gotabaya Rajapaksa	Senior member (Special Grade) of the Sri Lanka Administrative Service (SLAS)
Sithy Dane Arfa Thassim	Member of the Board	May 2021		Gotabaya Rajapaksa	High Court Judge (Rtd.)
Thambiaiah Yogarajah	Member of the Board	May 2021		Gotabaya Rajapaksa	Senior Official of the Presidential Commission
P M W Sampath Perera	Member of the Board	May 2021		Gotabaya Rajapaksa	Lawyer
Madhava Jayawardhana	Member of the Board	May 2021		Gotabaya Rajapaksa	Lawyer
Jayantha Wickramasinghe	Member of the Board	May 2021		Gotabaya Rajapaksa	Deputy Inspector general of Police (Rtd.)

=== Mandate ===
The Office on Missing Persons is not law enforcement or Judicial agency, but a truth and investigative one. The findings of the OMP will not give rise to any criminal or civil liability. The commission has the power to recommend compensation and to clear the way for next of kin to take legal action against those responsible for the disappearance of their loved ones. According to Part II Section 10 of the Office on Missing Persons Act, No. 14 of 2016, the office was established:

(a) to search for and trace missing persons and identify appropriate mechanisms for the same and to clarify the circumstances in which such persons went missing;

(b) to make recommendations to the relevant authorities towards addressing the incidence of missing persons;

(c) to protect the rights and interests of missing persons and their relatives as provided for in this Act;

(d) to identify avenues of redress to which missing persons and relatives of missing persons are entitled and to inform the missing person (if found alive) or relative of such missing person of same;

(e) to collate data related to missing persons obtained by processes presently being carried out, or which were previously carried out, by other institutions, organizations, Government Departments and Commissions of Inquiry and Special Presidential Commission of Inquiry and centralize all available data within the database established under this Act;

(f) to do all such other necessary things that may become necessary to achieve the objectives under the Act

The OMP had a budget of Rs 1.3 Billion (2018).

== See also ==
- Sri Lanka and state terrorism
- Human rights in Sri Lanka
- Alleged war crimes during the final stages of the Sri Lankan Civil War
