= Derrick Nugawela =

Colonel Derrick Nugawela was a Sri Lankan army officer, planter and banker.

Born to prominent Radala family in Kandy, Nugawela was educated at Trinity College, Kandy. Starting his career as a Tea Planter, Nugawela went on to serve as Assistant Superintendent, Superintendent and General Manager of several plantations including Dimbula and Kirkoswald.

Joining the Ceylon Volunteer Force, he was commissioned as a second lieutenant in the 2nd (V) Battalion, Ceylon Light Infantry in December 1950. With the formation of the Ceylon Sinha Regiment, Nugawela was transferred to the 2nd (V) Battalion, Ceylon Sinha Regiment in 1956. In June 1967 Nugawela was appointed commanding officer of the 2nd (V) Battalion, Ceylon Sinha Regiment with the rank of lieutenant colonel and served till April 1970 when Lieutenant Colonel Allen Nugawela succeeded him. He then served as the deputy commandant, Ceylon Volunteer Force from 1970 to 1972 having been promoted to colonel. When the 1971 JVP Insurrection started in April 1971, Colonel Nugawela was appointed Military Coordinating Officer, Hambantota District on 11 April 1971. He was able to reestablish government control over district, however the murder of Premawathie Manamperi took place in Kataragama by troops under his command.

In the mid 1970s, he migrated to Australia on sponsorship of Sir Roden Cutler and became an executive of Citibank. Returning to Sri Lanka in 1986, he worked for several years as a consultant for Citibank in Colombo and the Asian Development Bank. He served as Deputy Director-general of the Board of Investment.
