= Liyanarachchi =

Liyanarachchi is a surname. Notable people with the surname include:

- Kalpana Liyanarachchi (born 1973), Sri Lankan cricketer
- Nimali Liyanarachchi (born 1989), Sri Lankan runner
- Ranitha Liyanarachchi (born 1994), Sri Lankan cricketer
- Wijedasa Liyanarachchi (?–1989), Sri Lankan lawyer
