= Sri Lanka Reserve Police =

Sri Lanka Police units

The Reserve Police was a part-time volunteer section of the Sri Lanka Police that existed from 1974 to 2006. It was head by the Commandant, Reserve Police who was appointed by the Inspector General of Police.

== History ==
The Police Ordinance No 16 of 1865 which established a statutory police force in the island of Ceylon, provided provisions for the Inspector General of Police or a Superintendent of Police to appoint additional police officers as special constables to keep the peace, which was practiced during emergencies such as the 1915 riots.

Following the 1971 JVP Insurrection, the Reserve Police was established in 1974, following the enactment of the Police (Amendment) Law, No. 3 of 1974 which amended the Police Ordinance No 16 of 1865 to include the appointment of part-time volunteers as reserve police officers subjected to service in any part of the island. It included the creation of the post of Commandant, who would command the police reserve assisted by a Deputy Commandant. The Commandant may mobilize any reserve police officer on the recommendations of the Inspector General of Police and on mobilization the reserve police officer would have the same powers as a regular police officer of the same rank. With the start of the Sri Lankan Civil War in the 1980s reserve police officers remained in a constant state of mobilization due to man power needs of the police and served as a supplement to the regular police by means of recruitment of a non-permanent basis as well as on reduced recruitment inhibitors such as age and qualifications compared to the regular police force. Over the years the reserve police officers claimed that there was a disparity between them and their regular police counterparts with similar service in terms of rank and pay. This led to disbandment of the reserve police in 2006 and its personal were transferred to the regular police.

== Ranks ==
- Reserve Superintendent - Appointed by the IGP
- Reserve Assistant Superintendent - Appointed by the IGP
- Reserve Chief Inspector - Appointed by the IGP
- Reserve Inspector - Appointed by the Commandant, Reserve Police
- Reserve Sub-Inspector - Appointed by the Commandant, Reserve Police
- Reserve Police Sergeants-Major - Appointed by the Commandant, Reserve Police
- Reserve Police Sergeants (RPS) - Appointed by the Commandant, Reserve Police
- Reserve Police Constable (RPC) - Appointed by the Commandant, Reserve Police

== See also ==
- Sri Lanka Army Volunteer Force
- Sri Lanka Volunteer Naval Force
- Sri Lanka Volunteer Air Force
