= Alan Nugawela =

Army officer, planter

Allen Nugawela
- Military career
- Allegiance: Sri Lanka
- Branch: Ceylon Army
- Service years: 1954–1974
- Rank: Colonel
- Service number: O/1148
- Units: Ceylon Light Infantry, Ceylon Sinha Regiment
- Commands: Inspector, Sri Lanka Volunteer Force; 2nd (V) Battalion, Ceylon Sinha Regiment
- Conflicts: 1971 JVP Insurrection

Colonel Alan Tollence Nugawela (19??–2007) was a Sri Lankan army officer and a planter.

Born to prominent Radala family in Kandy, his father was Tikiri Banda Nugawela, Rate Mahatmaya of Udu Nuwara and his mother was Mariah Keppetipola, who claim to descend from Keppetipola Disawe. Nugawela was educated at Hillwood College, Kandy and Trinity College, Kandy, where his contemporaries included Denzil Kobbekaduwa. He started his career as a Tea Planter and later served as a Director of the Central Finance Company in Kandy.

Joining the Ceylon Volunteer Force, he was commissioned as a second lieutenant in the 2nd (V) Battalion, Ceylon Light Infantry in February 1954. With the formation of the Ceylon Sinha Regiment, Nugawela was transferred to the 2nd (V) Battalion, Ceylon Sinha Regiment in 1956. In 1962, Captain Nugawella was appointed an Extra ADC to William Gopallawa, Governor-General of Ceylon. Promoted to major, Nugawela served on the Governor-General's staff as his principle ADC from 1967 to 1970. In May 1970 Nugawela was appointed commanding officer of the 2nd (V) Battalion, Ceylon Sinha Regiment with the rank of lieutenant colonel succeeding Colonel Derrick Nugawela and served till April 1973. During his tenor as commanding officer, the 2nd battalion's barracks in Kandy was expanded and in April 1971, the battalion was mobilized for active service with the 1971 JVP Insurrection and was deployed in counter-insurgency operations. He relinquished command of the 2nd battalion in May 1973, promoted to Colonel and was appointed Inspector Sri Lanka Volunteer Force from 1973 to 1974.

He married Irangani Bulankulame and his brother-in-law was Major General Richard Udugama, who married his sister Rita Nugawela Kumarihamy. He lived at the Eladatte Estate in Handessa
