= Ceylonese protests against the Vietnam War =

Protests inpresent-day Sri Lanka in 1971

- Part of protests against the Vietnam War and the 1971 JVP insurrection
- Location: Dominion of Ceylon
- Caused by: Opposition to United States involvement in the Vietnam War; Ceylonese government support to the U.S. during the Vietnam War
- Goals: End of U.S. involvement in the Vietnam War and Ceylonese support to the U.S. government
- Methods: Civil disobedience; Vandalism; Protest marches
- Result: Prohibition of several Ceylonese leftist youth groups

Parties
Government of Ceylon; Ceylonese Armed Forces; Ceylon Police	Janatha Vimukthi Peramuna: Dharmasekara Clique; Kotte Clique; Peradeniya Clique; Lanka Sama Samaja Party (Revolutionary); Revolutionary Youth Front; Supported by: Ceylon Communist Party (Maoist) (alleged)

Lead figures
William Gopallawa; Dudley Senanayake	Dharmasekara; D.A Gunesekara; Sarath Wijesinghe

Casualties
- Deaths: 1–2
- Injuries: 10–12
- Arrested: 100 (19 March 1971); 120 (20 March 1971); 375 (30 March 1971); 410 (1 April 1971)

In March 1971, several left-wing political organisations in the Dominion of Ceylon (modern-day Sri Lanka) protested against U.S. involvement in the Vietnam War.

== Protests ==
The protesters gathered in the road leading to the U.S. embassy in Ceylon, and many of them were youths who were influenced by the worldwide anti-war movement including the one in the United States. The government paid no attention to the protests until 10 March 1971, when the protesters threw a petrol bomb towards the United States embassy in Ceylon.

The rioters attacked and damaged the vehicles parked outside the embassy and killed a police officer, who was at duty outside the embassy. The attacks were believed to be planned by the political movement Janatha Vimukthi Peramuna (JVP, People's Liberation Front), a revolutionary communist youth front. Although it was new, the group had committed to many crimes, according to other leftist groups at the time. The LSSP R and the Revolutionary Youth Front (Ceylon) were also among the rally.

The JVP denied active involvement, which it claimed had been the responsibility of government-sponsored anti-communism, which was trying to stop a revolutionary movement. After the allegations, the JVP planned to arm itself, especially against the government, and to become more elitist. JVP members later claimed that they had in fact been involved but that the group that had thrown a petrol bomb was a different group, the JVP - Dharmasekara group, and that Wijeweera had no involvement. They stated further that the JVP - Dharmasekara group was a Maoist group that tried to stop them from carrying out a revolution involving a 'mass movement', rather than the Maoist tactic of a potracted people's war. Later in prison, Wijeweera wrote a book that stated, "It is much easier to make a guerrilla than coordinate a political movement".

=== Account of the JVP members ===
According to the JVP, a Politburo member, known as Dharmasekara, was responsible. Osmond was the second leader of the JVP, after Wijeweera, and said that he had not been aware of the attack. Police raided his compound to arrest him, and in prison, Wijeweera sent a message to Osmond, who was also under arrest, according to 'Niyamuva', a JVP publication:

Distribute a leaflet to make the masses aware regarding the reppression, carry out other propaganda campaigns, full time activists to change their areas to avoid suppression and to retreat at places where reppression is high. Also, to meet lawyers favourable to the party regarding taking legal action to free the members currently under arrest.

== Government ban and arrests ==
The government banned the JVP. The ban was to be lifted by 1972, but the group had begun a uprising, which made the government name it as a terrorist organization. The Ceylon Communist Party (Maoist) was also banned in 1971, after the uprising.

The JVP leader, Rohana Wijeweera, was arrested and sent to the Jaffna Prison. The other groups that were blamed were the Lanka Sama Samaja Party (Revolutionary), the Socialist Students Union (a recruitment wing of the JVP) and the Revolutionary Youth Front (Ceylon).

=== 13 March 1971 ===
Wijeweera and Senanayake was arrested by the Ceylon Police Force.

=== 19 March 1971 ===
It was announced that the police and the army were given broad powers. The number taken into custody was around 100.

=== 20 March 1971 ===
The Department of Information reported that the number taken into custody was around 120. The security forces set fire to a house for the first time at Mawarala in Matara to capture some JVP members.

=== 27 March 1971 ===
The government captured more than 300 youths. Many who worked with Nagalingam Shanmugadasan at the Ceylon Communist Party (Maoist) was also arrested. Vidyodaya and Vidyalankara Campuses were raided by the army because of the alleged connections to the JVP and the Ceylon Communist Party (Maoist). By 1 April, over 410 had been arrested.

=== 5 April 1971 ===
The JVP launched a planned island-wide armed insurrection to overthrow the government.

== See also ==
- 1971 JVP insurrection
- 1953 Ceylonese Hartal
- Anti-American sentiment
- Decolonization of Asia
- Quit India movement
- Naxalbari uprising
