= Nimalka Fernando =

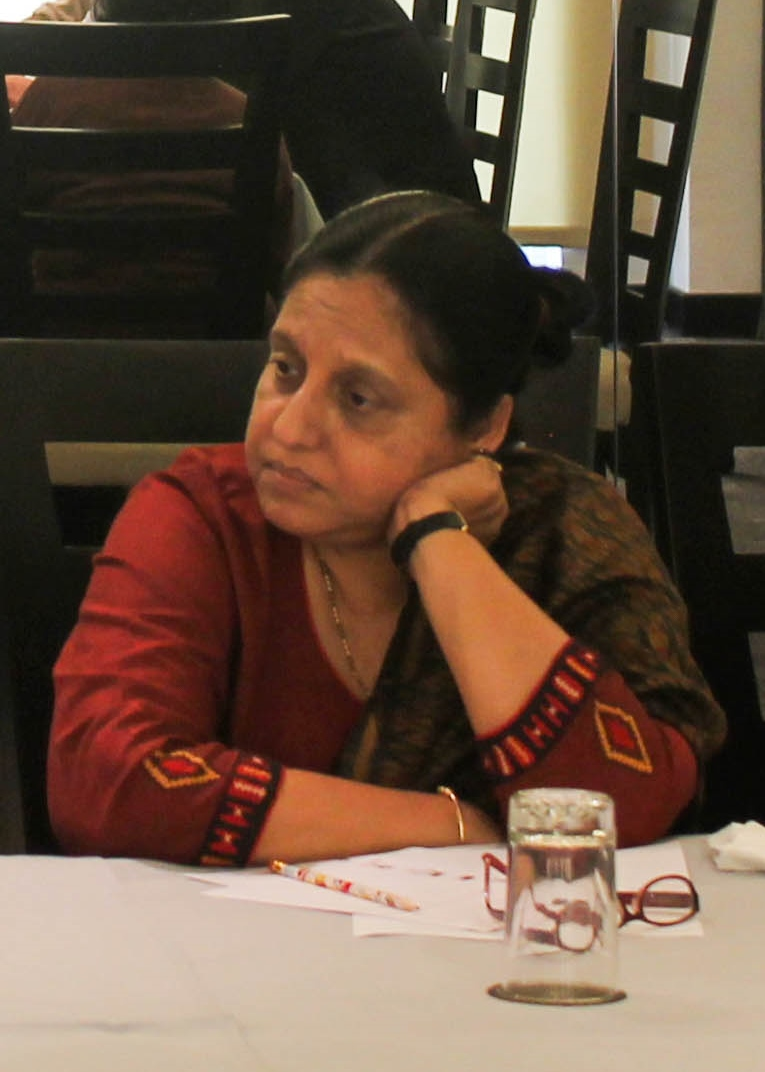
- Nimalka Fernando in 2015
- Born: 1953 (age 72–73); Colombo
- Education: Bishop's College
- Children: 1

Nimalka Fernando is a Sri Lankan attorney-at-law and women’s rights activist. She is a member of the Democratic People’s Movement in Sri Lanka, which is a coalition of people’s movements, NGOs and trade unions initiating action and dialogue for alternative development paradigms. She is President of the International Movement Against All Forms of Discrimination and Racism (IMADR) and the Women’s Forum for Peace in Sri Lanka. Nimalka is a founding member of Asian Regional Exchange for New Alternatives or ARENA and was a member of the ARENA Executive Board 1994 – 1997.

In March 2018, Fernando was appointed by Sri Lankan President Maithripala Sirisena as one of the commissioners for the Office of Missing Persons (OMP). Her appointment was opposed by The Global Sri Lankan Forum which was expressed through a statement requesting for her removal.

== Personal life ==
Fernando studied at Bishop's College, Colombo. She obtained her degree in Law from Sri Lanka Law College. She has a son, Kanishka, from her first marriage. She was friends with Rajani Thiranagama, a well known Sri Lankan academic and Human Rights activist killed by the Liberation Tigers of Tamil Eelam.
