= Sri Lanka and state terrorism =

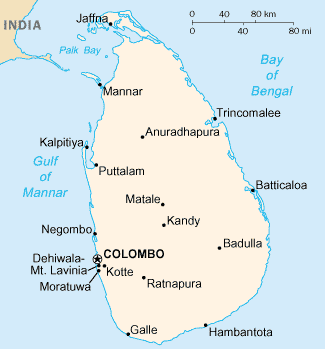
Main cities in Sri Lanka.

The Sri Lankan state has been accused of state terrorism against the Tamil minority as well as the Sinhalese majority, during the two Marxist–Leninist insurrections. The Sri Lankan government and the Sri Lankan Armed Forces have been charged with massacres, indiscriminate shelling and bombing, extrajudicial killings, rape, torture, disappearance, arbitrary detention, forced displacement and economic blockade. According to Amnesty International, state terror was institutionalized into Sri Lanka's laws, government and society.

== History ==
=== 20th century ===
Sri Lanka gained independence from Britain in 1948 as the Dominion of Ceylon, although the British Royal Navy retained a base there until 1956. In 1972, the country became a republic, adopting the name Sri Lanka. Since this time, the country has experienced several armed conflicts– a civil war, two Marxist uprisings, and other terrorist incidents.

==== Marxist-Leninist insurrections ====
From 1985 to 1989, Sri Lanka responded to violent insurrection with equal violence against the Sinhalese majority as part of the counterinsurgency measures against the uprising by the Marxist Janatha Vimukthi Peramuna (JVP) party. In order to subdue support of the JVP uprising, several acts of cruelty committed by the state were recorded, including the torture and mass murder of school children. This repression peaked amongst the Sinhalese population between 1989–90. Approximately 90,000 casualties occurred during between 1971 and 1990, most of whom were Sinhalese male youths.

==== Civil war ====
The Sri Lankan Civil War lasted from 1983 to 2009. In 1986, an American-Tamil social anthropologist at Harvard University stated that acts of terrorism had been committed by all sides during the war, but although all parties in the conflict had resorted to the use of these tactics, in terms of scale, duration, and sheer numbers of victims, the Sri Lankan state was particularly culpable. This was echoed by the Secretary of the Movement for Development and Democratic Rights, a non-governmental organisation, which further claimed that the Sri Lankan state viewed killing as an essential political tool. This had originally prompted the demand for a separate state for minority Tamils called Tamil Eelam in the north of the country, an idea first articulated by S.J.V. Chelvanayagam in 1976.

Assaults on Tamils for ethnic reasons have been alleged, and the experience of state terrorism by the people of Jaffna has been alleged to have been instrumental in persuading the United National Party to increase their hostilities there.

Chandrika Kumaratunga was the President of Sri Lanka from 1994 to 2005. In an interview with the British television presenter and news critic David Frost, she stated that at the time that her husband Vijaya Kumaranatunga was assassinated, "Sri Lanka had a killing fields, there was a lot of terror perpetrated by the government itself, state terrorism." This statement has been supported by a report released by the Asian Legal Resource Centre (ALRC), a non-governmental organization based in Hong Kong and associated with the United Nations, which has also claimed that there was widespread terrorism committed by the state during this period.

=== 21st century ===
Following the collapse of peace talks in 2006, human rights agencies such as the Asian Center of Human Rights (ACHR), the University Teachers for Human Rights (UTHR), and pro-LTTE political parties such as the Tamil National Alliance claimed that the government of Sri Lanka had unleashed state terrorism as part of its counterinsurgency measures against the rebel LTTE movement. The Sri Lankan government responded by claiming that these allegations by the LTTE were an attempt by the LTTE to justify their own acts of terrorism.

The ACHR has also stated that following the collapse of the Geneva talks of February 2006, the government of Sri Lanka perpetrated a campaign of state terrorism by targeting alleged LTTE sympathizers and Tamil civilians. A spokesman for Human Rights Watch was of the opinion that "the Sri Lankan government has apparently given its security forces a green light to use dirty war tactics." International intervention in Sri Lanka was requested by Tamil sources to protect civilians from state terrorism.

== State terrorist groups ==
The Sri Lankan government has been accused of the usage state-sponsored paramilitaries to commit war crimes. Many of these groups were created at the height of the second JVP uprising. During the civil war, one of the major state-sponsored paramilitaries was the Tamil Makkal Viduthalai Pulikal, led by Karuna Amman.

=== Anti-separatist paramilitaries ===
- Eelam People's Democratic Party – Led by former leader of the Eelam People's Revolutionary Liberation Front, Douglas Devananda
- Tamil Makkal Viduthalai Pulikal – A highly controversial organization which defected from the LTTE in 2004, led by Karuna Amman, former LTTE commander of the Eastern Province.

=== Anti-communist paramilitaries ===
- Eagles of the Central Hills – Formerly active in Kandy. Responsible for the massacre of suspected JVP rebels in 1989. Also responsible for killings of workers at Peradeniya University.
- Black Cat group – Responsible for attacks on politicians and civilians. The group would threaten members of the Communist Party of Sri Lanka throughout the late 1980s.

== See also ==
- State sponsored terrorism
