= Athula Nimalasiri Jayasinghe =

Sri Lankan revolutionary and politician

Hon. Athula Nimalasiri Jayasinghe

Deputy Minister of Power and Energy
- In office 1994–2001

Member of Parliament for Gampaha District
- In office 1989–2004

Personal details
- Born: 1944
- Died: 2014 (aged 69–70)
- Party: Janatha Vimukthi Peramuna (1965-1973); Sri Lanka Freedom Party
- Other political affiliations: United People's Freedom Alliance
- Profession: Businessmen

Wijayamuni Devage Athula Nimalasiri Jayasinghe (known as Athula Nimalasiri Jayasinghe or Loku Athula) (1944 - 2014) was a Sri Lankan revolutionary and politician. A JVP leader of the 1971 JVP insurrection, Jayasinghe was later elected to the Sri Lankan Parliament and served as a Deputy Minister of Power and Energy.

== Early life and education ==
Born to a well to do family in Gonahena, Kadawatha in the Gampaha District, he was the eldest with four younger sisters. He received his education at Kirillawala Maha Vidyalaya and at Rahula Vidyalaya, Gampaha, before moving to Colombo for his GCE Ordinary Level and GCE Advanced Level with the ambition to study engineering.

== Revolutionary ==
As a student he got quickly involved in the revolutionary that became the Janatha Vimukthi Peramuna (JVP) becoming one of its founding leaders along with Rohana Wijeweera. Becoming an active member, Jayasinghe adopted the nom de guerre "Loku Athula" and became one of the top four leaders. He organized training camps and began training members in martial arts. He was responsible for armed wing of the group and took command of its carders in the districts of Kegalle and Kurunegala. He was unsuccessful in holding the area and withdrew to the jungles of Wilpaththu, where he was captured with what of left of his carders which had reduced to 40 from 300. He was wounded in the final encounter with the Ceylon Army and was sent to Colombo for medical treatment. He was the 6th accused in the Criminal Justice Commission prosecution of the perpetrators of the insurrection. He turned crown witness along with W.T. Karunarathne, becoming a witness for the prosecution against the accused and gained a pardon in 1975.

== Political career ==
Following his release from prison, he joined the Sri Lanka Freedom Party. He was elected to the provincial council, having been elected in the 1988 and 1993 provincial council elections. He contested the 1994 general election and was elected to parliament and appointed Deputy Minister of Power and Energy. He remained in until 2004. In 2005, he supported Mahinda Rajapaksa in the presidential election.
