= Tony Opatha =

Sri Lankan cricketer (1947–2020)

Personal information
- Full name: Antony Ralph Marinon Opatha
- Born: 5 August 1947; Colombo, Ceylon
- Died: 11 September 2020 (aged 73); Colombo, Sri Lanka
- Batting: Right-handed
- Bowling: Right-arm medium
- Role: Bowler

International information
- National side: Sri Lanka (1975–1979)
- ODI debut (cap 6): 7 June 1975 v West Indies
- Last ODI: 16 June 1979 v India

Career statistics
Competition	ODI	FC	LA
Matches	5	39	20
Runs scored	29	790	100
Batting average	9.66	17.17	7.69
100s/50s	0/0	0/3	0/0
Top score	18	65	19
Balls bowled	253	6,548	1,092
Wickets	5	111	21
Bowling average	36.00	30.74	33.85
5 wickets in innings	0	2	0
10 wickets in match	0	0	0
Best bowling	3/31	6/91	3/20
Catches/stumpings	3/–	24/–	8/–
- Source: ESPNcricinfo, 24 December 2014

Antony Ralph Marinon Opatha (5 August 1947 – 11 September 2020) was a Sri Lankan cricketer. A right-arm medium pace bowler, he played five One Day Internationals at the 1975 and 1979 Cricket World Cups.

Educated at St. Peter's College, Colombo, Opatha joined the Royal Ceylon Volunteer Air Force in 1968. He had played for his college cricket team and went on to play for the Air Force cricket team until 1977. He first played for Ceylon in 1971 and was a member of the Sri Lankan teams in the World Cups in England in 1975 and 1979. He later played club cricket in Ireland for one season in 1979 (after having played for Denton West in 1977) and was offered the post of coach of the Holland team.

As player/manager of the rebel tour to South Africa in 1982–83 in defiance of the sporting ban against the apartheid state, Opatha and the other tourists received a lifetime ban from international cricket. The name of the team, "Arosa Sri Lankan XI", derived from Opatha's initials ARO plus SA for South Africa. The ban was lifted in 1991.

Opatha was coach of the Netherlands women's national cricket team at the 1995 Women's European Cricket Cup in Ireland.

In September 2018, Opatha was one of 49 former Sri Lankan cricketers felicitated by Sri Lanka Cricket, to honour them for their services before Sri Lanka became a full member of the International Cricket Council (ICC).
