= Sunil Handunnetti =

Sri Lankan politician

Hon. Sunil Handunneththi MP
- සුනිල් හඳුන්නෙත්ති சுனில் ஹந்துநெத்தி
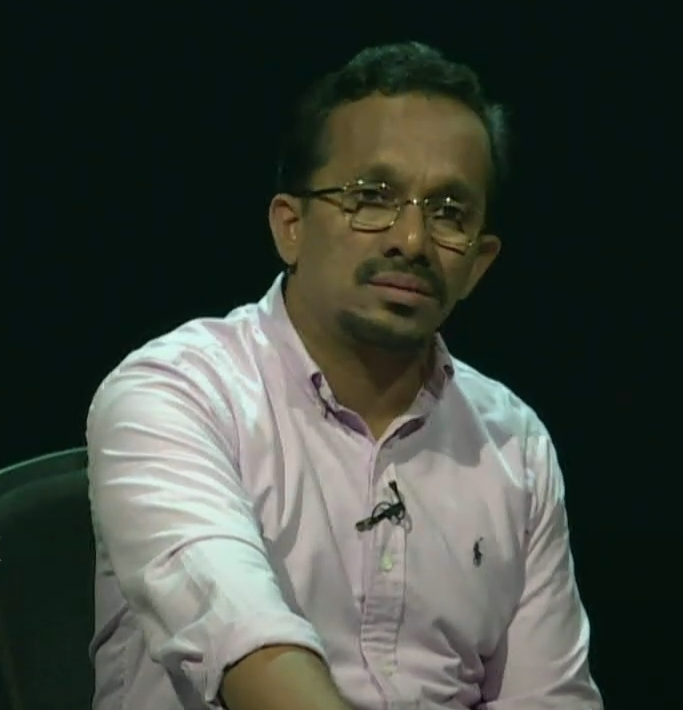
- Handunneththi in 2023

Minister of Industries and Entrepreneurship Development
- Incumbent
- Assumed office 18 November 2024
- President: Anura Kumara Dissanayake
- Prime Minister: Harini Amarasuriya
- Preceded by: Harini Amarasuriya

Member of Parliament for Matara District
- Incumbent
- Assumed office 21 November 2024
- Majority: 249,251 Preferential votes

Member of Parliament for National List
- In office 1 September 2015 – 2 March 2020

Member of Parliament for Colombo District
- In office 19 December 2001 – 26 June 2015

Personal details
- Born: October 19, 1971 (age 54) Deniyaya, Matara, Sri Lanka
- Party: Janatha Vimukthi Peramuna
- Other political affiliations: National People's Power
- COPE Chairperson from 2015 to 2020

Sunil Handunneththi (Handunnetti; born October 19, 1971) is a Sri Lankan politician and a member of the Parliament of Sri Lanka who has served as the Minister of Industries and Entrepreneurship Development since November 2024. A member of the National People's Power and Janatha Vimukthi Peramuna, he was elected as a Member of Parliament for Matara Electoral District in 2024 Sri Lankan parliamentary election. He formerly contested 2010 parliamentary elections under the Democratic National Alliance (DNA), which is led by former army chief Sarath Fonseka and was re-elected to Parliament from Colombo District.

== Early life and education ==
Handunneththi was born on 19 October 1971 in Deniyaya, Matara, Sri Lanka. He attended Dharmasoka College in Ambalangoda and earned a Bachelor of Science in Business Administration from the University of Sri Jayewardenepura.

== Political career ==
Handunneththi entered politics by being a student in Sri Jayawardanapura University and became the Convener of the Inter University Students' Federation in 1995 and continued until 1996. Was an activist in the Socialist Students Union and entered full-time politics in 1998 and was elected as a councilor of the Colombo Municipal Council during 1998-1999. Handunnetti was elected to the Central Committee of the JVP in 2000 and was appointed to the Political Bureau of the JVP in 2012 and was appointed as the Financial Secretary of the JVP. Elected to Parliament at the general election held in 2004 with the second highest number of preferential votes from Colombo District. In 2004 was appointed as the Deputy Minister of Ministry of Rural Economic Affairs.

== Electoral history ==
Election	Constituency	Party	Alliance	Votes	Result
1999 provincial	Colombo District	JVP		635	Not elected
2000 parliamentary	Colombo District	JVP		8,823	Elected
2001 parliamentary	Colombo District	JVP		9,438	Elected
2004 parliamentary	Colombo District	JVP	UPFA	152,942	Elected
2010 parliamentary	Colombo District	JVP	DNA	78,126	Elected
2015 parliamentary	Matara District	JVP		35,270	Not elected
2020 parliamentary	Matara District	JVP	NPP	37,136	Not elected
2024 parliamentary	Matara District	JVP	NPP	249,251	Elected
