= Wijedasa Liyanarachchi =

Sri Lankan lawyer and human rights activist

Wijedasa Liyanarachchi (1958 – 2 September 1989) was a Sri Lankan lawyer. His death from wounds received while in police custody made him a cause célèbre for human rights in Sri Lanka during the 1987–1989 JVP insurrection.

== See also ==
- State terrorism in Sri Lanka
- 1987–89 JVP Insurrection
