= Eagles of the Central Hills =

Paramilitary in Sri Lanka

- මධ්‍යම කඳුකරයේ රාජාලීන්
- Country: Sri Lanka
- Allegiance: Sri Lanka Army (claimed)
- Ideology: Anti-communism; Sinhalese nationalism
- Political position: Far-right

The Eagles of the Central Hills was a far-right Sinhalese paramilitary group in Sri Lanka. It was mainly active during the 1987–1989 JVP insurrection, where it was one of the main anti-communist paramilitaries alongside the Black Cat group and violently opposed the Marxist–Leninist Janatha Vimukthi Peramuna (JVP).

The Eagles of the Central Hills were believed to consist of off-duty police and military personnel. They reached out to local police stations and often claimed responsibility for killing militants or affiliates of the JVP through massacres and assassinations.

== Kandy massacre ==
In Kundasale on 13 September 1989, the JVP allegedly killed sixteen family members of three security forces personnel.

In retaliation, the Eagles set fire to a number of residential dwellings in Menikhinna the following night, killing approximately 52 people. The armed group then moved onto the villages of Kundasale and Aranagala, where they killed a further 30 people. Residents of Kandy found over 100 bodies floating in the river, and it was suspected that there were at least 50 additional deaths. It was the group's most ambitious attack, tolling up to over 250 murders and over 50 disappearances.

== Peradeniya University massacre ==
On 5 October 1989, armed vigilantes shot or beheaded fourteen workers at a Peradeniya University residential complex for custodial and clerical staff. Police later received a message from the vigilantes, who called themselves the Eagles of the Central Hills, claiming responsibility for the murders and that the victims were JVP supporters who had allegedly engineered the murder of T. E. Nagahawatte, an assistant registrar at the university and a captain in the local army volunteer reserve force.
