= Jinadasa Weerasinghe =

Sri Lankan politician

Member of Parliament for Tangalle
- In office 1977–1987
- Preceded by: constituency created
- Succeeded by: constituency abolished

Personal details
- Born: 8 June 1926
- Died: 31 July 1987 (aged 61)

Puwakdandawa Jinadasa Weerasinghe (8 June 1926 – 31 July 1987) was a Sri Lankan politician and Member of Parliament who represented the Tangalle electorate for United National Party from 1977 to 1987. He was assassinated by the Janatha Vimukthi Peramuna (JVP) during the second JVP insurrection.

After being elected in the 1977 general election, he was shot dead on 31 July 1987 while his car was stopped on the way to his home in Tangalle. He was returning from the signing of the Indo-Sri Lanka Accord, following which riots broke out and curfew was imposed island wide. His teenage son who was accompanying him was also shot and critically wounded. Police blamed the Janatha Vimukthi Peramuna for the assassination.

== See also ==
- List of assassinations of the Second JVP Insurrection
