= Sri Lanka Volunteer Air Force =

The Sri Lanka Volunteer Air Force (SLVAF) is the volunteer reserve element of the Sri Lanka Air Force. Its current mission is to provide trained personnel in support of the Sri Lanka Air Force, specifically No. 3 Squadron, SLAF Regiment and Airfield Construction Squadron. It is very similar to the Royal Air Force's Royal Auxiliary Air Force and the Sri Lanka Volunteer Naval Force of the Sri Lanka Navy.

All officers and airmen who are commissioned or enlisted to the Volunteer Air Force has to undergo a specified training course to suite the SLAF requirements since they are a part of the staff of the SLAF. The duration and the nature of the training is determined by the Commander of the SLAF.

== History ==
It was formed in 1971 vide Extraordinary Gazette No. 14, 953/18 dated 14 April 1971 by the Governor-general. This was in response to the manpower shortage faced by the air force in face of the 1971 JVP Insurrection that started on 5 April 1971. The purpose of the Volunteer Air Force is to absorb personnel into the organization to fulfill urgent requirements and mobilize in specialized as well as in other areas on a temporary basis to supplement the regular force. Sqn Ldr J.T. Rex Fernando was the first Commanding Officer of the unit with Flt. Lt. Mani Seneviratne as his adjutant.

At its conception the role of the Volunteer Force was essentially to assist the Regular Force in its primary and internal security duties. With more volunteers employed on internal security duties the skilled regular tradesmen were able to concentrate on their specialist technical and other skilled duties.

Apart from internal security duties and general operational tasks Volunteer personnel were employed almost in every field of Air Force activity, on flying duties, Air Field Construction, Mechanical Transport Operations and maintenance, Engineering duties, Logistics and Catering Duties and Administrative, clerical, Medical and other miscellaneous service duties. The Airfield Construction Squadron was organized to undertake major construction projects and maintenance commitments.

Among the officers, specialists recruited were General Duties Pilots who were required to supplement the small number of Regular Pilots who were continuously flying day and night on operational and air transportation commitments since the outbreak of the insurrection. The Volunteer Pilots were intended to provide some relief though it was not possible to immediately employ most of them on flying operational duties. While a very few were experienced pilots, most of the selected pilots held previous experience in light training aircraft only. A rapid course of training on the basic De Havilland Chipmunks and converting them on the De Havilland Doves and De Havilland Herons they were of assistance to the regular pilots. The volunteers were demobilized by 1972 when the insurrection was stopped successfully.

== Squadrons ==
- No. 3 Squadron, SLAF Regiment
- Airfield Construction Squadron

== Notable members ==
- Desmond de Silva - Entertainer
- Tony Opatha - National Cricketers

== See also ==
- Sri Lanka Army Volunteer Force
- Sri Lanka Volunteer Naval Force
- Royal Auxiliary Air Force
- RAF Volunteer Reserve
