= Tangalle Electoral District =

Electoral district of Sri Lanka

Tangalle electoral district was an electoral district of Sri Lanka between July 1977 and February 1989. The district was named after the town of Tangalle in Hambantota District, Southern Province. The 1978 Constitution of Sri Lanka introduced the proportional representation electoral system for electing members of Parliament. The existing 160 mainly single-member electoral districts were replaced with 22 multi-member electoral districts. Tangalle electoral district was replaced by the Hambantota multi-member electoral district at the 1989 general elections, the first under the proportional representation system.

== Members of Parliament ==
Key

Independent SLFP UNP

| Election | Member | Party | Term |
|---|---|---|---|
| 1977 | Jinadasa Weerasinghe | United National Party | 1977 - 1987 |

== Elections ==
=== 1977 Parliamentary General Election ===
Results of the 8th parliamentary election held on 21 July 1977:

| Candidate | Party | Symbol | Votes | % |
|---|---|---|---|---|
| Jinadasa Weerasinghe | United National Party | Elephant | 23,456 | 58.25 |
| H.S. de Silva | Sri Lanka Freedom Party | Hand | 11,673 | 28.99 |
| D. E. W. Gunasekera | Communist Party of Sri Lanka | Star | 3,831 | 9.51 |
| Vijitha Ranaweera | | Bell | 1,234 | 3.06 |
| Valid Votes | | | 40,194 | 99.81 |
| Rejected Votes | | | 75 | 0.19 |
| Total Polled | | | 40,269 | 100.00 |
| Registered Electors | | | 46,470 | |
| Turnout | | | | 86.66 |
