= Socialist Students Union =

Student wing of Janatha Vimukthi Peramuna

Socialist Students Union සමාජවාදී ශිෂ්‍ය සංගමය
- Abbreviation: SSU
- National Organizer: Rangana Lakmal Dewapriya
- Founder: Rohana Wijeweera
- Founded: 1965
- Headquarters: 464/20, Pannipitiya Road, Pelawatta, Battaramulla, Sri Lanka.
- Ideology: Communism; Marxism-Leninism; Anti-revisionism; Revolutionary socialism Anti-imperialism
- International affiliation: WFDY
- Affiliations: Inter University Students' Federation
- Type: Student wing
- Status: Banned (from 1983 to 1994); Legal (1994 – present)
- Mother party: Janatha Vimukthi Peramuna
- Ex chief secretaries: 1.Comrade Shantha Bandara; 2.Comrade Lalith Wijerathne; 3.Comrade D.M.Ananda; 4.Comrade H.B.Herath; 5.Comrade Upali Jayaweera; 6.Comrade Ananda Idamegama; 7.Comrade c.R.Nishshanka; 8.Comrade Athula senarathna 9.Comrade Anura Kumara Dissanayake; 10.Comrade Sunil Handunnetti; 11.Comrade Bimal Rathnayake; 12.Comrade Mangala Kuruppu

Party flag

Website
- ssusrilanka.com

Socialist Students Union of Sri Lanka (SSU), also known as Samajavadi Shishya Sangamaya, is a students' union in Sri Lanka that operates as the students' wing of the Marxist-Leninist Janatha Vimukthi Peramuna.

It is currently a member of the Inter-university Students' Federation.

The SSU was formed in 1968 by Marxist Rohana Wijeweera, initially called Samajawadi Shishya Sangamaya (සමාජවාදී ශිෂ්‍ය සංගමය), the SSU is the oldest student union in Sri Lanka, and promotes Communism. It was able to start recruiting youths from both universities and independent student councils; by 1970 the SSU was dominant in student politics and was able to operate as the armed wing of the JVP in 1970 especially during the ruling period of The United Front. Shantha Bandara was the founding general secretary of the Socialist Students Union. All the general secretaries who succeeded him (before 1990) were killed in the struggle by the United National Party government that was in power at that time, this included Lalith Wijerathne, H. B. Herath, D. M. Ananda, Upali Jayaweera, Ananda Idamegama, c. R. Nissanka, and Athula Senarathna. The SSU together with the Patriotic Students' Union were banned in 1988. After 1990, the Socialist Students Union was again reformed. Anura Kumara Dissanayake was its founding general secretary. Sunil Handunnetti, Bimal Rathnayake and Mangala Kuruppu became general secretaries after him.
