= Rex De Costa =

Sri Lankan medical doctor and soldier

- Born: 15 June 1920; Colombo, Ceylon
- Died: 9 April 1971 (aged 50); Deniyaya, Ceylon
- Military career
- Branch: Ceylon Defence Force; Ceylon Army Volunteer Force
- Service years: 1944-1956
- Rank: Lieutenant colonel
- Units: Ceylon Medical Corps, Ceylon Army Medical Corps, Ruhunu Regiment
- Commands: 1 Battalion, Ruhunu Regiment
- Conflicts: World War II; First JVP Insurrection X
- Awards: Member of the Order of the British Empire; War Medal 1939–1945; Defence Medal
- Other work: Vice President, World Veterans Federation

Lieutenant Colonel Dr. Anthony St. Clare Rex de Costa, MBE, CAVF (15 June 1920 – 9 April 1971) was a renowned Sri Lankan medical doctor and soldier. He was the commanding officer of the Ruhunu Regiment, a doctor in the Ceylon Defence Force during World War II and a vice president of the World Veterans Federation. He was assassinated by the JVP during the 1971 Insurrection.

== Personal life ==
Born to Dr Marceline de Costa and Lilia De Costa nee Rajapaksha. He was educated at the Royal College, Colombo and at the Colombo Medical College.

He was married to his cousin Doreen de Costa nee Gunathilake, and had four children: Marcel, Cheryl, Rex and Eric. After his death, the family was involved in community work in the town of Deniyaya and had close links to his old regiment, 2nd(V) Sri Lanka Army Medical Corps.

== Army life ==
After graduating, de Costa joined the Ceylon Medical Corps of the Ceylon Defence Force as a lieutenant during World War II and served in active duty until the demobilization at the end of the war, yet stayed on as a reservist with the rank of captain. His brother Malcolm de Costa joined the Ceylon Navy Volunteer Reserve and served with the Royal Navy during the war. Reaching the rank of captain, Malcolm served as commander, Volunteer Naval Force.

When the Ceylon Army was formed in 1949 after Ceylon gained its independence, de Costa strayed with the newly created Ceylon Army Volunteer Force as a major and played a significant part in its early stages. In 1954, with the formation of the Ruhunu Regiment, a reserve force raised from personnel from the southern province, he transferred to it.

He became the commanding officer of the 1st Battalion, Ruhunu Regiment based in Galle with the rank of lieutenant colonel. During this time, his adjutant was Lt. Tissa Weerathunga, who would later become the head of the Sri Lankan Army. Following the general election of 1956, when S.W.R.D. Bandaranaike became prime minister, he disbanded the Ruhunu Regiment as he considered it loyal to the previous UNP government. Lt. Col. de Costa requested a transfer to his old unit, the Ceylon Army Medical Corps, which was turned down. Therefore, at the age of 36, he retired from the army as one of its youngest lieutenant colonels. For his wartime service, he had earned the Defence Medal and the War Medal 1939–1945, and for service in the Ceylon Army, he received the Ceylon Armed Services Inauguration Medal, and the Queen Elizabeth II Coronation Medal.

Thereafter, he took up the cause of world war veterans around the world and joined the World Veterans Federation. He travelled to several countries for WVF work and became its vice president from 1961 to 1963. For his service, he was appointed a Member of the Order of the British Empire by HM Queen Elizabeth II and retired to a quiet life to his family home in Deniyaya in 1967. There, he continued his medical practice for the benefit of the poor in the area.

== Death ==
On 5 April 1971, the Janatha Vimukthi Peramuna launched an insurrection against the government. Since the insurrection had taken the Ceylon Government by surprise, many of the small police stations in rural areas were unprepared and overrun in the initial days, with many constables and officers killed. The small police station in the town of Deniyaya also came under insurgent attacks, and Dr. Rex de Costa volunteered his help in the form of medical aid to wounded constables and in weapons training, which the police lacked. When the situation became critical on 8 April, the OIC of the Deniyaya Police Station decided to withdraw his personnel to the safety of a larger Police Station in Rakwana. The Inspector asked Dr. Rex de Costa to come with them. Since his children were sick, Lt. Col. de Costa refused and stayed behind. After the police withdrew from Deniyaya town and its police station, releasing the detainees held there. As the insurgent learnt of Dr. Rex de Costa's assistance to the police, an insurgent unit went to his house around 9 am on April 9, Good Friday and demanded that he come out. As he came out from the front door with his hands raised, he was cut down by a hail of bullets. Dr. Rex de Costa died instantly in front of his wife.

The assassination of Dr. Rex de Costa was one of the major incidents of the 1971 JVP Insurrection. Justice A. C. Alles, a member of the Commission of Inquiry established under the Criminal Justice Commissions Act, following the insurrection, dedicated an entire chapter in his book about the insurrection to De Costa Murder.

== See also ==
- Premawathie Manamperi
- Noel Weerakoon
