= Premawathie Manamperi =

Sri Lankan girl (killed 1971)

- ප්‍රේමවතී මනම්පේරි
- Born: 18 January 1949; Kataragama, Sri Lanka
- Died: 17 April 1971 (aged 22); Kataragama, Sri Lanka
- Cause of death: Gunshot wounds
- Body discovered: Kataragama
- Education: Kataragama Vidyalaya
- Known for: Murder and torture victim
- Parents: Hendrik Appuhamy (father); Lilawathi Obeysinghe (mother)

Premawathi Manamperi (18 January 1949 – 17 April 1971) was a woman from Kataragama, Sri Lanka. She was arrested on suspicion of leading a rebel group that disturbed the country in 1971. That year, she was handed over to the army where she was tortured, possibly raped and paraded naked through the streets, and killed. Her death is a prominent event in Sri Lankan crime history.

== Early life ==
Manamperi was the oldest daughter of Hendrick Appuhamy, a watcher in the Department of Wildlife in Devatagama, Kataragama. She had ten brothers and sisters. She took the Dharmacharya examination and worked as a Dhamma teacher at Kataragama Dhamma School.

In 1970, Manamperi was crowned Princess of the Year at a festival in Kataragama.

== Death ==
On 5 April 1971, the JVP insurrection started. Kataragama was a center of insurgent activity. On 16 April, Inspector Udawatte and three police constables arrested Manamperi at her home under suspicion of rebel association.

Manamperi was tortured throughout the night, but revealed nothing about her activities. The lieutenant Wijesuriya made Premawathi take off her clothes and walk across the town nude while being beaten by him and another officer. Manamperi was shot in front of the Gunasiri Hotel (now Matara Hotel). According to Gunasiri, the owner of the hotel, after being shot Manamperi was still conscious and had asked for some water from him. However, the army officers had carried her away and made arrangements to bury her.

The burial was assigned to Aladdin. Recognizing Aladdin, Manamperi took off her earrings and asked him to give them to her mother. Soon after another soldier shot her in the head. Despite being shot again, the postmortem done after her body was exhumed revealed that Manamperi was still alive when she was being buried. This has been mentioned in the full review compiled by Dr. Ruwan M. Jayaratne on the 1971 insurrection.

Along with Manamperi, six other females were arrested, and they were all detained at the Pilgrim's Rest of S.L.T.B Kataragama.

== Controversies ==
There are several controversies related to Manamperi's death. She was arrested under the suspicion that she was a JVP rebel whereas several witnesses have stated that she had no direct connection with the JVP. In the Kataragama Dhamma School, where Manamperi was working as a Dhamma Teacher, it was suspected that the JVP were conducting the 'Panthi Paha' programme that recruit and prepare existing members for revolt. Using this as a pretext, the Kataragama Police officer-in-charge (OIC), Sub-Inspector (SI) Jayasiri Udawatte took revenge on Manamperi by arresting her as she had rejected his lustful advances on earlier occasions. When she was crowned as the Kataragama beauty queen in 1970, he had met her on stage and there after showed his interest towards her which she had rejected repeatedly.

When the Kataragama police was attacked by JVP insurgents, the military was deployed to control the situation. Colonel Derrick Nugawela was appointed Military Commanding Officer of the Hambantota District on 11 April 1971. The army established their camp at the Pilgrim's Rest House. Since the police station was attacked, SI Udawatta and the other police officers also remained at the same camp.

On 16 April, Manamperi and few other females were arrested on the grounds that they were JVP rebels by SI Wijesuriya and few other officers. They were taken to the aforementioned camp. Reports state that she was tortured throughout the night as she had denied having connections with the JVP which made Lt. Wijesuriya, a volunteer officer, furious. This resulted in her gruesome death. Although Lt. Wijesuriya and another officer were convicted for attempted murder, nothing was done to arrest SI Wijesuriya who had framed her unlawfully.

Even though Manamperi being stripped naked and humiliated suggest that she might have been raped, there have not been any investigations conducted regarding it and no arrest have been made. Although there is evidence, that SI Wijesuriya had a major role to play in her unlawful arrest, there were no investigations conducted against him. Furthermore, investigations have revealed that these army officers failed to arrest any actual JVP rebels, except Manamperi and the other girls who were proven not guilty.

== Aftermath ==
Manamperi's body was exhumed on 24 May 1971 and an inquest was held. The case was later referred to the Galle Criminal Court by the Hambantota Magistrate. The case was heard by Supreme Court judge D.Q.M. Sirimanne. The murder suspects, Lieutenant Alfred Wijesuriya and Amaradasa Ratnayake, a member of the volunteer force, were brought to trial. He was found guilty of attempted murder on 17 April 1971, by shooting her with a sub-machine gun. The two accused were sentenced to 16 years of imprisonment in 1973. Wijesuriya died of a heart attack a year later in prison. in 1988, Ratnayake was killed at his home in Devinuwara by the suspected JVP hit team at Matara as a punishment for the murder of Premawathi.

== Remembrance ==
In 1979, a memorial was built in Kataragama to commemorate her death that portray various events of her life and her inhumane death. This shrine was built as a merit to her as pilgrims who visit Kataragama could quench their thirst by drinking water from the clay pot fixed to it. However, later the memorial was vandalized and now is believed to be destroyed.

Sri Lankan singer and songwriter, Anton Jones (3 June 1937 – 21 February 2016) whose songs were based on real incidents such as 'Rukmani Devi' (popular Sri Lankan film actress and singer), 'Maru-Sira'(controversial passing away of a death-row prisoner) wrote a song based on Manamperi's death as well. The title of the song is 'Premawathi Manamperi Tharuniya'.

Furthermore, a movie named 'Nahi Werena Verani' was filmed based on Manamperi's brutal killing. Director Dharmasiri Wickremaratne used the original case recordings to create the plot line of the movie. The role of Premawathi was acted by Sangeetha Weeraratne, while Sanath Gunathilake played the role of the Army officer Lieutenant Wijesuriya. The role of Army General in the film was played by the veteran actor Joe Abeywickrema.

Although not mentioned by name, allusions to Manamperi have been made in the 2022 Booker Winner, The Seven Moons of Maali Almeida by Sri Lankan author Shehan Karunatilaka as Miss Kataragama 1970 and as the Defiled Beauty Queen.

== 1977 election ==
Her murder attracted national attention and was an issue in the 1977 election. UNP candidate J. R. Jayewardene discussed the attack in great detail and condemned Sirimavo Bandaranaike's handling of the crime to discredit his opponent.

== See also ==
- Rex De Costa
