= Ruhunu Regiment =

National Service Regiment
- Active: 1954 - 1956
- Country: Ceylon
- Branch: Ceylon Army
- Role: Reserve Infantry
- Size: 1 Battalion, 1 Detachment

Commanders
- Notable commanders: Lieutenant Colonel Rex De Costa, MBE

The Ruhunu Regiment was a former Military reserve force of the Ceylon Army. The regiment was raised in 1954 in Galle with a detachment in Matara. It was disbanded in 1956 when S.W.R.D. Bandaranaike became prime minister as he considered the unit to be loyal to the opposition. Its personnel made up volunteer units of the Gemunu Watch when it was formed in 1962. Raised along with the Rajarata Rifles, it was one of only three geographically based regiments in the Sri Lanka Army.

== See also ==
- Rex De Costa
