= Assassination of Daya Pathirana =

1986 murder in Piliyandala, Sri Lanka

Daya Pathirana assassination
- Part of Prelude to the 1987-1989 JVP insurrection
- Location: Bolgoda Lake, Piliyandala, Sri Lanka
- Date: 15 December 1986
- Target: Daya Pathirana
- Attack type: Cut-throat
- Deaths: 1 killed (Daya Pathirana)
- Injuries: 1 wounded (Somasiri)
- Perpetrator: Janatha Vimukthi Peramuna activists (some were students affiliated to Inter University Students' Federation)

The assassination of Daya Pathirana took place on 15 December 1986. Daya Pathirana was the leader of the Independent Students Union of University of Colombo during 1985–1986. Pro-Janatha Vimukthi Peramuna activists (some of them were members of Inter University Students' Federation) are accused of his murder. This assassination is considered as a watershed incident in the 1987–1989 Janatha Vimukthi Peramuna insurrection.

== Background ==
Daya Pathirana pioneered the Independent Students Union of University of Colombo during his study at the Faculty of Arts, University of Colombo. In the book Sri Lanka: The Travails of Unfinished War, Protracted Crisis (1995), Dr. Dayan Jayatilleka describes Pathirana as a very poor student, a radical leftist, not a member of the old Left or the traditional Left. Although he was leftist, he vehemently opposed Janatha Vimukthi Peramuna, the Marxist-Leninist political party which had almost total control over the students' unions in Sri Lanka. Therefore he and the Independent Students Union led by him became the most serious threat to the Janatha Vimukthi Peramuna control. In a report named Insurrectionary Violence in Sri Lanka: The Janatha Vimukthi Peramuna Insurgencies of 1971 and 1987-1989, Tisaranee Gunasekara describes Pathirana as a "radical student activist, with impeccable anti-United National Party/anti-systemic credentials". Taking over the entire university system was a vital objective, because the Inter University Students' Federation was earmarked by the leadership of the Janatha Vimukthi Peramuna to be the public political face of the party.

== Abduction and assassination ==
On 15 December 1986, he along with a colleague named Somasiri was abducted to a lonely spot off the Bolgoda Lake, Piliyandala. The abductors then began to torture him and Somasiri, demanding information about other student and left activists. This was interrupted by a group of pilgrims (as it was the full moon poya day) It saved the life of Somasiri. But Pathirana's throat was slit at the point of intervention, and he eventually succumbed to his wounds.

== Aftermath ==
The assassination of Daya Pathirana is considered as the first targeted killing of the 1987–89 Janatha Vimukthi Peramuna insurrection. The subsequent uprising proved extremely costly to the country, leaving approximately 60,000 dead or missing. However in 1996, six years after the failed insurrection, General Secretary Tilvin Silva denied that Janatha Vimukthi Peramuna was involved in the Daya Pathirana murder.

== See also ==
- List of assassinations of the Second JVP Insurrection
- Inter University Students' Federation
