= Gladys Jayawardene =

Physician and academic

- Born: Sri Lanka
- Education: Ladies' College
- Occupation: Physician
- Spouse: Roland Jayawardene

Gladys Jayawardene (died September 12, 1989) was a Sri Lankan physician and academic. She was the first female Director of the Medical Research Institute and Chairman of the State Pharmaceutical Corporation.

Educated at C.M.S. Ladies' College, Colombo, she graduated from the Colombo Medical College and gained a PhD in Parasitology from the University of London as the first Sri Lankan female to do so.

Joining the Ceylon Medical Service after graduation she transferred to the Medical Research Institute and went on to become its first female Director in the 1980s and in 1988 was appointed Chairman of the State Pharmaceutical Corporation (SPC). During her tenure the SPC began manufacturing Oral Rehydration Salts "Jeevanee" based on a formula approved by the WHO and UNICEF which had been imported before. Dr Jayawardene was threatened by the others to stop imports of medicines from India due to their Anti-Indian policy. She refused to be intimidated and was assassinated on September 12, 1989 at Slave Island, Colombo.

She married Roland "Roly" Jayawardene, a medical doctor and brother of J. R. Jayewardene. She was the President of the Ladies' College Old Girls' Association in 1973–1974. The Gladys Jayawardene Gold Medal for Parasitology is awarded annually by the Faculty of Medicine, University of Colombo.

== See also ==
- List of people assassinated by the Janatha Vimukthi Peramuna
- 1987–1989 JVP Insurrection
- Stanley Wijesundera
