= Noel Weerakoon =

Sri Lankan army officer

Major Noel Weerakoon, CA was a Sri Lankan army officer. He was the first officer of the Sri Lanka Army to be killed in action during the 1971 Insurrection.

Trained at the Royal Military Academy Sandhurst, Weerakoon was commissioned into the Ceylon Artillery. He played cricket for Sandhurst and the Ceylon Army. In April 1971, with the onset of the Janatha Vimukthi Peramuna-led insurrection Ceylon Army mobilized for its first combat operations since its formation in 1949. Captain Weerakoon lead a supply convoy from Vavuniya to Anuradhapura to deliver ammunition to the besieged town. He was wounded when his convoy was ambushed by insurgents. He succumbed to his wounds at the Anuradhapura hospital, becoming the first Sri Lankan army officer to be killed in the line of duty. He was posthumously promoted to the rank of Major.

His widowed young wife, Ramya Weerakoon went on to form Ramya Holdings, which became the holding company for many of the manufacturing and export industries she started following the death of her husband.
