= Assassination of Harsha Abeywardena =

1987 political assassination in Sri Lanka

- Location: Wellawatte, Colombo, Sri Lanka
- Date: 23 December 1987
- Target: Harsha Abeywardena, UNP Chairman
- Attack type: Targeted shooting
- Weapon: T-56 assault rifle
- Deaths: 4
- Perpetrator: Janatha Vimukthi Peramuna (JVP) (alleged)
- Judge: T. B. Weerasuriya

The assassination of Harsha Abeywardena occurred on 23 December 1987 in Wellawatte, Colombo, Sri Lanka. Abeywardena, the chairman of the ruling United National Party (UNP), (Note: Some sources describe Abeywardena as UNP General Secretary. He had held that post from 1979 before being elected party Chairman in December 1984, and was re-elected Chairman at the party's annual convention days before his death.) was shot and killed alongside three others during the 1987–1989 JVP insurrection. The attack was attributed to the Janatha Vimukthi Peramuna (JVP).

== Harsha Abeywardena ==
Harsha Deva Abeywardena (c. 1950 – 23 December 1987) was a Sri Lankan politician who held senior organisational office in the ruling United National Party (UNP), serving as the party's General Secretary and later as its chairman. He was a close political ally of President J. R. Jayewardene during the 1987–1989 JVP insurrection.

=== Political career ===
Abeywardena held two of the UNP's principal organisational offices. He served as General Secretary of the party, and subsequently as chairman, a post concerned with the party's day-to-day affairs, which he had held for about four years by the time of his death. He was re-elected Chairman at the UNP's annual convention shortly before he was killed.

== Background of the assassination ==
Following the signing of the Indo-Sri Lanka Accord in July 1987, the JVP launched an armed insurrection opposing the agreement and the presence of the Indian Peace Keeping Force (IPKF). UNP officials and organisers became targets for the group's military wing, the Deshapremi Janatha Viyaparaya (DJV). Abeywardena had been re-elected party chairman at the UNP's annual convention shortly before the attack.

== Incident ==
On 23 December 1987, Abeywardena was attacked by gunmen in the Colombo suburb of Wellawatte. According to contemporaneous reporting, the assailants had waited near his residence, posing as men repairing a bicycle tyre, before opening fire at close range with a T-56 assault rifle. Abeywardena, his driver, a police bodyguard and a bystander were killed.

== Legal proceedings ==
By late April 1988, five suspects had been arrested in connection with the assassination. The case was heard in Colombo High Court 2 before Judge T. B. Weerasuriya from mid-February 1989. Senior State Counsel Nihara Rodrigo and State Counsel Asoka Weerasooriya appeared for the State, and the accused was defended by Ananda Wijesekera PC.

The proceedings faced multiple delays. The second accused, Hemantha Dias, escaped from Magazine Prison during a jailbreak in December 1988. During the trial the first accused, Lasantha Wijewardena, alleged that his confession had been extracted under torture. When the case resurfaced in mid-1991, it emerged that the first accused had been shot dead by an unknown assailant on 23 September 1989 while under guard at the General Hospital, and that the fifth accused, Liyanage, had been shot dead while allegedly attempting to escape.

== Aftermath ==
A state funeral was held in Colombo under tight security. Abeywardena's killing was one of a series of attacks on the UNP leadership, including the assassination of UNP General Secretary Nandalal Fernando in May 1988, which also took place in Wellawatte. The violence continued until the insurrection ended in late 1989.

== See also ==
- List of people assassinated by the Janatha Vimukthi Peramuna
