= Stanley Wijesundera =

Sri Lankan academic

- Born: 6 December 1923; Ampitiya, Kandy, British Ceylon
- Died: 8 March 1989 (Aged 65); Colombo, Sri Lanka
- Cause of death: Assassination
- Education: Trinity College, Dharmaraja College, Ananda College, University of Ceylon, University of London, University of Oxford
- Occupation: Academic
- Title: Vice Chancellor of the University of Colombo
- Term: 1979–1988
- Predecessor: Position established
- Successor: G. L. Peiris
- Spouse: Anoja Wijesundera

Stanley Wijesundera (6 December 1923 – 8 March 1989) was a Sri Lankan academic. He served as the first Vice chancellor of the University of Colombo from 1979 to 1988. A professor of biochemistry, he was the chairman of the Association of Commonwealth Universities from 1983 to 1984. Wijesundera was assassinated by the JVP hitmen during the 1987–89 JVP Insurrection.

== Early life and education ==
Born in Kandy, He was educated at Trinity College, Dharmaraja College and Ananda College, Colombo. Entering the University of Ceylon he studied at both the Colombo campus and Peradeniya campus, graduating with a BSc (Hons) in chemistry. Going on to the University of London, he gained his MSc and DSc and his PhD from the University of Oxford.

== Academic career ==
On return to Ceylon he was appointed as a lecturer in the University of Ceylon, where he served in both Peradeniya and Colombo in various capacities from 1948 to 1977 as assistant lecturer, lecturer, associate professor and also on various commit-tees both academic and administrative.

He served as a member of the University Senate from 1970 to 1978. He became a professor at the Department of Biochemistry in the Faculty of Medicine, University of Colombo, becoming the chair of the department in 1978. Thereafter he become the dean of the Faculty of Science and later was appointed as the first vice chancellor of the University of Colombo in January, 1979, when it was established as an independent university after the disestablishment of University of Sri Lanka. He served as the chairman of the Association of Commonwealth Universities from 1983 to 1984.

Wijesundera retired from the office of the vice chancellor in late 1988, and was succeeded by G. L. Peiris. He was given his own office at the College House after he left office to continue his researches.

== Assassination ==
During the 1987–89 JVP Insurrection, Wijesundera came under pressure from elements of the Janatha Vimukthi Peramuna (JVP) to shut down the university. Wijesundera steadfastly refused the demand. This led to his assassination at the Library Room in the College House by members of the JVP on 8 March 1989.

== Personal life ==
He was married to Kalyani, the daughter of Walter Wijewardena and was the brother-in-law of the Upali Wijewardene. He was the Basnayake Nilame of the Kelaniya Raja Maha Vihara, a post later taken up by his son Shalitha Wijesundara, former chairman of the Sri Lanka Airports Authority and current Provincial Councilor, Western Province. His youngest daughter Lakmini Wijesundera, founder and CEO of BoardPAC and IronOne Technologies is the Entrepreneur of the Year in Sri Lanka for three consecutive years since 2015 and has been the first Ernst & Young EY Winning Woman to represent Sri Lanka.

== Legacy ==
According to many scholars and academics, Wijesundera was instrumental in transforming the University of Colombo to a Metropolitan Campus. At the time of his assassination in March 1989, he had already initiated the transformation of the university education system. Although his loss created an irreplaceable void, his family, associates and fellow academics have made great efforts to take his legacy forward.

As a tribute to the incredible legacy of him, Professor Stanley Wijesundera Memorial Lecture was started in 2007 led by Prof. Kamani Tennakoon and Prof. Eric Karunanayake and it is carried out annually.

On 10 December 2023, To mark his 100-year birth anniversary a commemorative first day cover and stamp was issued by the Postmaster General of Sri Lanka, S.Sathkumara at a special function organized at the Temple Trees. The event was presided by President Ranil Wickremesinghe, family and friends of Prof. Wijesundera and several other dignitaries.

== See also ==
- List of people assassinated by the Janatha Vimukthi Peramuna
- 1987–89 JVP Insurrection
- Gladys Jayawardene

Academic offices
Preceded by New appointment	Vice Chancellor of the University of Colombo; 1979–1989	Succeeded by G. L. Peiris
