= Kundasale =

Kundasale කුණ්ඩසාලේ குண்டசாலை
- suburb
- Location in Sri Lanka
- Coordinates: 7.3096°N 80.7104°E
- Country: Sri Lanka
- Province: Central Province
- District: Kandy

Population
  - Total: 150,000
- Time zone: UTC+5:30 (Sri Lanka Standard Time Zone)
  - Summer (DST): UTC+6 (Summer time)
- Post Code: 20168

Kundasale (Sinhala: කුණ්ඩසාලේ, romanized: Kuṇḍasālē; Tamil: குண்டசாலை, romanized: Kuṇṭacālai) is a former town, now a suburb of Kandy in Kandy District, Central Province of Sri Lanka. The town is situated 7 km (4.3 mi) to the southeast of the centre of Kandy. The population is about 150,000.

== History ==
King Vira Parakrama Narendra Sinha, the last Sinhalese King of Kandy, decided in 1710 to move his palace from Kandy to Kundasale. He instructed the local governor, Ramukwelle Dissawe, to construct the palace complex. Rambukwelle Dissawe engaged the services of a builder, Devendra, who built the palace completely out of wood on top of a hill in a garden, Narikele. The palace is purported to have been more a summer palace rather than a royal palace. He was the first and the last king to have Kundasale as the capital of the Kandyan Kingdom. The king died in May 1739 and in 1804 British troops under the command of Captain Arthur Johnson attacked the palace, plundered its valuables and burnt it to the ground. The building's remnants were used in the construction of the nearby Sri Narendrasinhe Rajamaha Viharaya. The two stone elephant carvings at the main entrance, Mahawahalkada, of Sri Dalada Maligawa (Temple of the Sacred Tooth Relic) are said to have come from the ruins of the Kundasale Palace. They were however destroyed in the 1989 attack on the temple by the Janatha Vimukthi Peramuna.
