= Menikhinna =

Coordinates: 7°19′N 80°42′E

- City
- Interactive map of Menikhinna
- Country: Sri Lanka
- Province: Central Province
- Time zone: UTC+5:30 (Sri Lanka Standard Time)

Menikhinna is a town in Central Province, Sri Lanka. This is situated in agricultural area where people mostly consume ground water. Knuckles mountain range is situated close by this town.

== See also ==
- List of towns in Central Province, Sri Lanka
