= Inter University Students' Federation =

Student organization in Sri Lanka

- අන්තර් විශ්වවිද්‍යාලයීය ශිෂ්‍ය බලමණ්ඩලය பல்கலைக்கழகங்களுக்கு இடையிலான மாணவர் கூட்டமைப்பு
- Emblem of the IUSF
- Abbreviation: IUSF (Anthare)
- Formation: 1978; 48 years ago
- Type: Umbrella body of Students' Unions
- Legal status: Active
- Purpose: Free education, Student Rights, Anti-privatization
- Headquarters: University of Sri Jayewardenepura
- Location: Nugegoda, Sri Lanka
- Region served: National
- Members: 17 State University Students' Unions; ~70 Faculty Students' Unions
- Official language: Sinhala, Tamil, English
- Convener: Adisha Gamage
- Website: iusflanka.org

The Inter University Students' Federation (Sinhala: අන්තර් විශ්වවිද්‍යාලයීය ශිෂ්‍ය බලමණ්ඩලය, Tamil: பல்கலைக்கழகங்களுக்கு இடையிலான மாணவர் கூட்டமைப்பு; commonly known as the IUSF or Anthare) is the largest student organization in Sri Lanka. It represents the collective voice of student councils from all major state universities across the country.

Established in 1978, the IUSF acts as an umbrella organization for various student unions in Sri Lankan state universities. It is well known for its activism regarding free education, student welfare, and broader national political issues. The organization is currently led by Convener Adisha Gamage.

== History ==
=== Formation and Early Years (1978–1987) ===
The IUSF was formed in 1978 to unite fragmented student movements under one banner to protect the rights of university students. Its first convener was Shantha Bandara, a prominent student leader from the University of Peradeniya.

During its early years, the IUSF campaigned heavily against the 1978 Constitution of Sri Lanka and proposed educational reforms (White Paper on Education) which they claimed would be detrimental to free education.

=== Insurrection and Ban (1987–1989) ===
During the 1987–1989 JVP insurrection, the IUSF played a major role in mobilizing students against the Indo-Lanka Accord and the presence of the Indian Peace Keeping Force (IPKF). The government banned the IUSF and other student unions in 1988. Many student leaders, including Conveners, were killed or disappeared during this period of "Bheeshanaya" (Terror). The ban was lifted in 1990.

=== Post-1990 and Recent Activism ===
Since re-establishing itself in the 1990s, the IUSF has been the primary force opposing the privatization of education in Sri Lanka.

- Battle against Private Universities: The IUSF launched massive protests against the establishment of private higher education institutes such as the North Colombo Medical College (NCMC) and later the South Asian Institute of Technology and Medicine (SAITM).
- 2022 Economic Crisis (Aragalaya): Under the leadership of then-convener Wasantha Mudalige, the IUSF played a pivotal role in the 2022 Sri Lankan protests ("Aragalaya") demanding the resignation of President Gotabaya Rajapaksa. They organized the massive "Anthare March" to Colombo which became a turning point in the protests.

== Organization and Leadership ==
The IUSF is led by a Convener selected by the representatives of the affiliated student unions. The headquarters is symbolically based at the University of Sri Jayewardenepura.

=== List of Notable Conveners ===
The position of IUSF Convener is considered one of the most influential youth political roles in Sri Lanka. Notable past conveners include:

- Shantha Bandara (First Convener)
- D.M. Ananda
- Ranjitham Gunaratnam (Abducted and disappeared)
- Sunil Handunnetti
- Ravindra Mudalige
- Duminda Nagamuwa
- Chameera Koswatta
- Udul Premaratne
- Sanjeewa Bandara
- Najith Indika
- Lahiru Weerasekara
- Wasantha Mudalige
- Madushan Chandrajith
- Sasindu Perera
- Adisha Gamage (incumbent)

== Controversies and Crackdowns ==
The IUSF is frequently involved in street protests which often result in clashes with the police. The government often uses tear gas and water cannons to disperse IUSF protests. Several conveners have been arrested and detained under the Prevention of Terrorism Act (PTA) and other laws for extended periods.

== See also ==
- Education in Sri Lanka
- Politics of Sri Lanka
- University of Sri Jayewardenepura
- University of Peradeniya
