= Chandratne Patuwathavithane =

- Born: Sri Lanka
- Education: Ananda College University of Ceylon King's College London
- Occupation: Academic
- Title: Dr.
- Spouse: Dorothy Patuwathavithane
- Children: Dilrukshi & Chatura Patuwathavithane

Chandratne Patuwathavithane (died September 14, 1989) is a Sri Lankan born academic who served as the vice chancellor of University of Moratuwa, Sri Lanka during 1980–1983 and 1988–1989 until he was assassinated in his office during the 1987–89 insurgency in Sri Lanka.

== Education ==
He was a product of Ananda College, Colombo and later gained admission to the University of Ceylon from where he graduated with a degree in engineering. He received a scholarship to study at King's College London, from which he received a PhD in mechanical engineering. Arthur C. Clarke's essay collection Greetings, Carbon-Based Bipeds! (1999) is in part dedicated to his memory with the note that he "was killed while serving his students."
