= List of current Sri Lanka Army formations =

The professional head of the army is the Commander of the Army, at present Lieutenant General Lasantha Rodrigo. He is assisted by the Chief of Staff of the Army. The Commandant of the Volunteer Force is head of the Army Volunteer Force and is responsible for the administration and recruitment of all reserve units and personnel. The Army Headquarters, situated in Sri Jayawardenepura is the main administrative and the operational headquarters of the Sri Lanka Army.

Organized and controlled by the Army General Staff at Army HQ, various formations are raised from time to time to suit various security requirements and operation in the country. The Army at present has one field corps (1 Corps) and five regional commands known as Security Forces Headquarters, which are the Security Forces Headquarters Jaffna (SFHQ-J), Wanni (SFHQ-W), East (SFHQ-E), Mullaitivu (SFHQ-MLT) and South (SFHQ-S).

Each SFHQ and most divisions are commanded by a General Officer Commanding in the rank of Major General. A SFHQ has several divisions under its command and each division is further divided into brigades. Each brigade is commanded by an officer in the rank of Brigadier and has a number of Infantry battalions, support arms (Artillery, Engineers and Signals) and support services (Service Corps, Engineering Services, Ordnance Corps, Electrical and Mechanical Engineers) under assigned to it. There are also several independent brigade (Air Mobile Brigade, Armored Brigade, etc.)

In other parts of the country, there are Area and Sub-Area Headquarters. Armour, Artillery, Engineers and Signals Units are grouped under Brigade Headquarters of their own arm; Armored Brigade, Artillery Brigade and so on.

Following is a list of all combat formations and their commands of the Sri Lanka Army.

== Headquarters formations ==
Army Headquarters Formation

- Independent Brigade HQ
- Commander Security Unit

SLAVF Headquarters

== Field Corps ==
1 Corps

- Reserve Strike Force
  - 53 Division, based at Inamaluwa, Dambulla
    - Air Mobile Brigade
  - 58 Division
- Special Operations Force
  - Commando Brigade
  - Special Forces Brigade

== Security Forces Headquarters ==
Security Forces Headquarters - Jaffna (SFHQ-J)

- 51 Division, based in Kopay
  - 511 Brigade, based in Ottahapulam
  - 512 Brigade, based in Jaffna
  - 513 Brigade, based in Keeramalai
  - 515 Brigade, based in Kankesanthurai
- 52 Division, based in the Mirisuvil
  - 521 Brigade, based in Vallei
  - 522 Brigade, based in Vidaththalpalei
  - 523 Brigade, based in Allarai
- 55 Division, based in Elephant Pass Military Base, Jaffna Peninsula
  - 551 Brigade
  - 552 Brigade, based in Iyakkachchi
  - 553 Brigade, based in Periyapachchapalai

Security Forces Headquarters - Wanni (SFHQ-W)

- Area Headquarters Mannar, Mannar
- 21 Division, based in Anuradhapura
  - 211 Brigade, based in Medawachchiya
  - 212 Brigade, based in Anuradhapura
  - 213 Brigade, based in Gajasinghepura
- 54 Division, based in Mannar
  - 541 Brigade, based in Kalliadi
  - 542 Brigade, based in Manthottam
  - 543 Brigade, based in Pesalei
- 56 Division, based in Kokeliya
  - 561 Brigade, based in Kanagarayankulam
  - 562 Brigade, based in Echchankulam
  - 563 Brigade, based in Navatkulam
- 62 Division, based in Galkulama
  - 621 Brigade, based in Welioya
  - 622 Brigade, based in Helamba Wewa
  - 623 Brigade, based in Vedivettukallu
- 65 Division, based in Alankulam
  - 651 Brigade, based in Mulankavil
  - 652 Brigade, based in Naddankandal
  - 653 Brigade, based in Thachchana Maradamadu

Security Forces Headquarters - East (SFHQ-E)

- 22 Division, based in Trincomalee
  - 221 Brigade, based in Plantain Point
  - 222 Brigade, based in Jayanthigama
  - 223 Brigade, based in Kaddaparichchan
- 23 Division, based in Poonani, Batticaloa District
  - 231 Brigade, based in Kallady
  - 232 Brigade, based in Tharavikulam
  - 233 Brigade, based in Vakarai
- 24 Division
  - 241 Brigade, based in Akkaraipattu
  - 242 Brigade, based in Komari

Security Forces Headquarters – Mullaitivu (SFHQ-MLT)

- 57 Division
  - 571 Brigade
  - 572 Brigade
  - 572 Brigade
- 59 Division, operating in the Mullaittivu District
  - 591 Brigade, based in Mullaittivu
  - 592 Brigade, based in Mathavalasinghekulam
  - 593 Brigade, based in Nayaru
- 64 Division operating in the Mullaittivu District
  - 641 Brigade, based in Puthukkudiyiruppu
  - 642 Brigade, based in Oddusuddan
  - 643 Brigade, based in Muthiyankaddukulam
- 66 Division operating in the Kilinochchi District
  - 661 Brigade, based in Poonaryn
  - 662 Brigade, based in Paranthan
  - 663 Brigade, based in Kilinochchi
- 68 Division Kombavil, Mullaittivu District
  - 681 Brigade
  - 682 Brigade

Security Forces Headquarters – West (SFHQ-W)

- 14 Division, based in Colombo, Western Province (formerly Operation Command Colombo)
  - 141 Brigade, based in Gampaha
  - 142 Brigade, based in Colombo and Kalutara
  - 143 Brigade, based in Puttalam and Kurunegala
  - 144 Brigade
- 61 Division
  - 611 Brigade, responsible for Kegalle and Rathnapura Districts
  - 612 Brigade, responsible for Kaluthara District
  - 613 Brigade, responsible for Galle and Matara Districts

Security Forces Headquarters – Central (SFHQ-C)

- 11 Division, based in Kundasale
  - 111 "Kandy" Brigade, based in Doluwa
  - 112 Brigade, based in Badulla
- 12 Division, based in Hambanthota
  - 121 Brigade, based in Buttala
  - 122 Brigade, based in Weerawila

== Independent units ==
Divisions

- Engineering Division
  - Field Engineer Brigade
  - Plant Engineer Brigade

Brigades

- Mechanized Infantry Brigade
- Armored Brigade
- Artillery Brigade
- Signals Brigade

== Disbanded ==
- Task Force Anti Illicit Immigration
- Security Forces Headquarters – Kilinochchi
- Northern Command
- Western Command
- Eastern Command
- Southern Command
