= Aruna Jayasekara =

Sri Lankan army general

Major General Aruna Jayasekara WWV RSP VSV USP MP
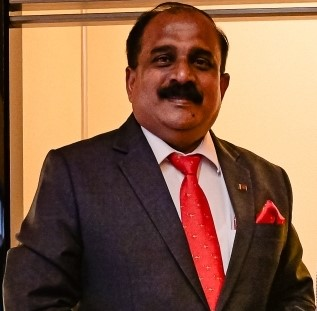
- Aruna Jayasekara in 2026
- Born: 19 October 1964 (age 61); Uva Province
- Military career
- Allegiance: Sri Lanka
- Branch: Sri Lanka Army
- Service years: 1985–2019
- Rank: Major General
- Unit: Gemunu Watch
- Commands: Security Forces Headquarters – East, 22 Division, 14 Division, 68 Division
- Conflicts: 1987–1989 JVP insurrection, Sri Lankan Civil War
- Awards: Weera Wickrama Vibhushanaya; Rana Sura Padakkama; Vishista Seva Vibhushanaya; Uttama Seva Padakkama

K. P. Aruna Jayasekara (born 19 October 1964) is a former senior Sri Lanka Army officer, politician and member of Parliament. He has served as the Commander, Security Forces Headquarters – East (2018–2019), Director of Training, Army Headquarters.

General Jayasekara is noted for commanding several deployments of Sri Lankan forces in UN peacekeeping missions and for commanding Task Force 08 (later 68 Division) in the 2008–2009 Sri Lankan Army Northern offensive, including the Battle of Puthukkudiyirippu.

== Early life and education ==
Born in the Uva Province, Jayasekara studied at the Uva College Badulla and the Central College Badulla.

== Military career ==
=== Infantry officer ===
He joined the Sri Lanka Army on 21 March 1985 as an Officer Cadet in the Intake SSC 04, receiving his basic training at the Sri Lanka Military Academy and was commissioned as a Second Lieutenant in the 1st Battalion of the Gemunu Watch on 4 October 1985. Serving as a Platoon commander and Adjutant, he was later transferred to the 4th Battalion, Gemunu Watch where he went on command as a commanding officer from October 1998 to September 2001. The 4th Battalion established in 1985 under the command of Lieutenant Colone Lakshman Algama, had taken part in counter-insurgency operations against the JVP insurrection and the LTTE during the Sri Lankan Civil War.

=== Training ===
Jayasekara had completed the Indian Army's Young Officers’ Course; Junior Command & Staff Course at the Command and Staff Training Institute in Bangladesh; the Staff Course at the Defence Services Staff College, the Senior Command Course at the Army War College, Mhow; the Allied Offers War Course at the National Defence University, Islamabad in 2008 and the National Defence Course at the National Defence College, Bangladesh in 2014.

=== Staff and higher command ===
Jayasekera went on to serve as a general staff officer, at the Directorate of Operations; Chief Instructor, Sri Lanka Military Academy; Colonel (general staff) HQ 53 Division, Directing Staff, Defence Services Command and Staff College; Brigade Commander, 212 Brigade; Director, Operations, Army Headquarters; Commander, Task Force 08; General Officer Commanding, 68 Division; Commandant, Sri Lankan Army Officers Career Development Centre; Director Training, Army Headquarters; Director Army Sports, Director General Training, Army Headquarters; General Officer Commanding, 14 Division; General Officer Commanding, 22 Division; Colonel of the Regiment - Gemunu Watch; Commander, Security Forces Headquarters – East.

=== Foreign deployment ===
In overseas deployments, Jayasekera served as the Deputy Contingent Commander of MINUSTA, lead the delegation Mali to reconnaissance on pre-deployment of troops under MINUSMA. Lectured on Jungle Warfare at the International Jungle Warfare Seminar held at Amazon Command in Manaus - Brazil. He took part in the India – Sri Lanka Joint Exercise ‘MITRA SHAKTI - 2015’ and TEMTEST in Jakartha - Indonesia. He was a keen Tennis player. He retired from the army in November 2019 and is a member of the Association of Retired Flag Rank Officers.

== Political career ==
He formed and headed the Retired Armed Forces Collective of the National People's Power (NPP) in 2023 and was nominated on the NPP National List for the 2024 Sri Lankan parliamentary election. He was elected to parliament and appointed deputy minister of defence in the 17th Parliament of Sri Lanka.
