= Nalin Angammana =

Sri Lankan senior army officer

Lieutenant General Nalin Angammana † RSP, USP
- ලුතිනන් ජෙනරාල් නලින් අංගම්මන
- Born: November 11, 1945; Kandy, Sri Lanka
- Died: July 30, 1995 (aged 49); Valaichchenai, Batticaloa, Sri Lanka
- Military career
- Allegiance: Sri Lanka
- Branch: Sri Lanka Army
- Service years: 1965–1995
- Rank: Lieutenant General
- Unit: Sri Lanka Engineers
- Commands: 3 Division, 1 Field Engineer Regiment
- Conflicts: 1971 Insurrection; Sri Lankan Civil War
- Awards: Rana Sura Padakkama; Uttama Seva Padakkama

Lieutenant General Nalin K. B. Angammana (Sinhala: ලුතිනන් ජෙනරාල් නලින් අංගම්මන) (1945 – 1995) RSP, USP, psc was a senior Sri Lanka Army officer, who was the former General Officer Commanding, 3 Division.

== Early life and education ==
Born in Kandy, Angammana was educated at Dharmaraja College, Kandy.

== Military career ==
In 1965 April 5, Joining the Ceylon Army, Angammana as an officer cadet and received his basic officer training at the Army Training Centre, Diyatalawa. Thereafter he was commissioned as a Second Lieutenant in the 1 Field Engineer Regiment, Sri Lanka Engineers. He attended the dthe Defence Services Staff College, Wellington gaining the Psc qualification and served as the commanding officer of the 1 Field Engineer Regiment from March 1987 to September 1988. He was serving as the General Officer Commanding, 3 Division when he was killed on 30 July 1995. He was returning to his headquarters following an inspection of army detachment that had been attacked the LTTE few hours prior. His vehicle hit a pressure mine buried by the LTTE off Valaichenai the resulting explosion killed Major General Angammana and three other officers and wounded 13 other soldiers. He is the most senior officer of Sri Lanka Army to be killed in the field during the Sri Lankan Civil War, he was posthumously promoted to the rank of Lieutenant General and the Lieutenant General N K B Angammana Memorial Hall named in his honor at the regimental headquarters of the Sri Lanka Engineers.

== See also ==
- Denzil Kobbekaduwa
- Sri Lankan Civil War
