= Nanda Mallawaarachchi =

Sri Lankan army general

Major General Nanda Mallawaarachchi නන්ද මල්ලවආරච්චි
- Born: Anuradhapura
- Military career
- Allegiance: Sri Lanka
- Branch: Sri Lanka Army
- Service years: 1971 – 2007
- Rank: Major General
- Unit: Sri Lanka Light Infantry
- Commands: Acting Commander of the Army; Chief of Staff
- Awards: Rana Wickrama Padakkama; Vishista Seva Vibhushanaya; Uttama Seva Padakkama
- Other work: Sri Lanka's Ambassador to Indonesia & Permanent Secretary to the Ministry of Law and Order

Major General Nanda Mallawaarachchi RWP, VSV, USP, ndc, psc, Msc (Defense) is the Current Secretary of Sports in Sri Lanka. He was the former Secretary of Law & Order in Sri Lanka. He was also the former Acting Commander & Chief of Staff of the Sri Lanka Army as well as the Ambassador of Sri Lanka in Indonesia.

== Early life ==
He was born in Anuradhapura to Dr. Sirisena Mallawaarachchi & Siriyalatha Athukorale. He graduated from The Central College (Anuradhapura) and later Ananda College in Colombo.

== Military career ==
Mallawaarachchi enlisted into the Sri Lankan Army in 1971, upon his completion of his Officer Cadet training at the Sri Lanka Military Academy, Diyatalawa. He was commissioned a Second Lieutenant of Sri Lanka Light Infantry in 1972. He has had extensive training in many countries including the United States and India. He was a national champion in practical pistol shooting and is an excellent marksman. Major General Mallawaarachchi served the Sri Lankan Army for over 36 years throughout the island. He has held numerous positions in the Army, among them were The Acting Commander of the Sri Lankan Army, Chief of Staff of the Sri Lankan Army, Regimental commander of the Sri Lanka Light Infantry, 1st ever Security Forces Commander of Eastern area of Operations, General officer Commanding in 52 Division Jaffna, General officer Commanding in 23 Division Minneriya and Commandant and Vice Chancellor of the Kotawala Defence University.

== Diplomatic career ==
He was appointed Ambassador and Plenipotentiary of Sri Lanka to the Republic of Indonesia in July 2007.

== Secretary of Law & Order ==
On 23 August 2013 President Mahinda Rajapaksa created the Ministry of Law & Order and appointed Mallawaarachchi as Permanent Secretary to the Ministry. The Sri Lanka Police Service and the elite Special Task Force would function directly under the new ministry.

== Secretary of Sports ==
On 24 Oct 2014 Mallawaarachchi was appointed as the Secretary to the Ministry of Sports (Sri Lanka). He relinquished from his post as Secretary of Law & Order on the same day.
