= 12 Division (Sri Lanka) =

- Active: 2011 - Present
- Country: Sri Lanka
- Branch: Sri Lankan Army
- Type: Division (military)
- Role: Defense of the Port of Hambantota; Military Aid to the Civil Power
- Size: 20,000+ troops
- Part of: Security Forces Headquarters – Central
- Garrison/HQ: Hambantota

The 12 Division is a division of the Sri Lanka Army. Based at the Hambantota, it is responsible for the maintenance of capability for the defence of the Port of Hambantota. It is also responsible for carrying out training and administrative work. It was established 4 February 2011.
