= Security Forces Headquarters – East =

- Active: 31 October 2003 – Present
- Allegiance: Sri Lanka
- Branch: Sri Lanka Army
- Size: 3 divisions
- Garrison/HQ: Aselapura Camp, Welikanda, Polonnaruwa
- Anniversaries: 31 October
- Engagements: Sri Lankan Civil War
- Website: army.lk/sfhqeast

Commanders
- Current commander: Maj. Gen. Aruna Jayasekera

Security Forces Headquarters – East (SFHQ-E) is a regional command of the Sri Lanka Army, responsible for the operational deployment and command of all army units stationed in and around the country's Eastern Province. The command was established on 31 October 2003 with 2 divisions, and currently consists of the 22 Division, 23 Division and 24 Division, a total of 8 brigades. The current Commander, SFHQ-E is Maj. Gen. Santhusitha Pananwala, in office since 2 November 2017.

Like the other area commands of the Sri Lanka Army, it coordinates operations and deployments of ground units of the Navy, Air Force and Police with that of the army in the area.

Area of responsibility includes Trincomalee District, Batticaloa District, Ampara District and Polonnaruwa District

== Composition ==
- 22 Division, based in Trincomalee
- 23 Division, based in Poonani, Batticaloa District
- 24 Division, based in Malwatte

== Past Commanders ==
Rank	Name	Tenure
Maj. Gen.	N. Mallawaarachchi	31 October 2003 – 19 December 2004
Maj. Gen.	G. Hettiarachchi	20 December 2004 – 11 May 2005
Maj. Gen.	T.T.R. De Silva	12 December 2005 – 18 May 2006
Maj. Gen.	N. Wijesinghe	19 May 2006 – 18 December 2006
Maj. Gen.	P. Pannipitiya	18 December 2006 – 28 December 2007
Maj. Gen.	J.J.P.S.T. Liyanage	28 December 2007 – 16 November 2008
Maj. Gen.	S.M. De A. Rajapakse	16 November 2008 – 30 November 2009
Maj. Gen.	J.C. Rambukpotha	30 November 2009 – 1 February 2010
Maj. Gen.	S. Udumalagala	11 February 2010 – 27 December 2010
Maj. Gen.	M.H.S.B. Perera	1 January 2011 – 22 August 2011
Maj. Gen.	S.A.A.L. Perera	23 August 2011 – 19 February 2015
Maj. Gen.	N.J. Walgama	20 February 2015 – 14 January 2016
Maj. Gen.	K.M.U. Wijeratne	15 January 2016 – 31 October 2016
Maj. Gen.	D.D.U.K. Hettiarrachchi	1 November 2016 – 27 March 2017
Maj. Gen.	D.S.N.K. Senadeera	29 March 2017 – 2 November 2017
Maj. Gen.	H.W.M.S.D.B. Pananwala	2 November 2017 – 8 November 2018
Maj. Gen.	K.P.A. Jayasekera	9 November 2018 – October 2019
