= Security Forces Headquarters – West =

- Active: 15 November 2012 – Present
- Allegiance: Sri Lanka
- Branch: Sri Lanka Army
- Size: 2 divisions
- Garrison/HQ: Panagoda Cantonment, Homagama
- Anniversaries: 15 November
- Engagements: Sri Lankan Civil War
- Website: army.lk/sfhqwest

Commanders
- Current commander: Maj. Gen. Sathyapriya Liyanage

Security Forces Headquarters – West (SFHQ-W) is a regional command of the Sri Lanka Army, that is responsible for the operational deployment and command all army units stationed in the western part of the island, this includes two divisions. The current Commander SFHQ-W is Major General U A B Medawela. The SFHQ-W is based at Panagoda Cantonment.

Although it is primary a command of the Sri Lanka Army it coordinates operations and deployments of ground units of the Navy, Air Force and police with that of the army in that area. Security Forces Headquarters – West was formed spiting the Security Forces Headquarters – South which existed briefly.

Area of responsibility includes Colombo District, Gampaha District, Kalutara District, Galle District, Matara District, Ratnapura District, Kegalle District, Kurunegala District and Puttalam District.

== Composition ==
- 14 Division, based in Colombo, Western Province (formerly Operation Command Colombo)
  - 142 Brigade, based in Colombo and Kalutara
  - 143 Brigade, based in Puttalam and Kurunegala
  - 581 Brigade, based in Gampaha
- 58 Division
  - 141 Brigade, based in Galle and Matara
  - 583 Brigade, based in Ratnapura
