= 24 Division (Sri Lanka) =

- Active: 11 November 2009 – present
- Country: Sri Lanka
- Branch: Sri Lanka Army
- Part of: Security Forces Headquarters – East
- Garrison/HQ: Malwatte, Eastern Province

The 24 Division is a division of the Sri Lanka Army. Established on 11 November 2009 as Task Force 3, the division is currently based in Malwatte in the Eastern Province. The division is a part of Security Forces Headquarters – East and has two brigades.

The division includes battalions of the SLNG, SLSR, and the Vijayabahu Infantry Regiment. 241Brigade includes 3 ViR, 16 SLNG, and 28SLNG.
