= 23 Division (Sri Lanka) =

- Active: 1 January 1990 – present
- Country: Sri Lanka
- Branch: Sri Lanka Army
- Part of: Security Forces Headquarters – East
- Garrison/HQ: Punanai, Eastern Province

The 23 Division is a division of the Sri Lanka Army. Established on 1 January 1990 as the 3 Division. It was renamed as the 23 Division on 23 Jul 1997. The division is currently based in Punanai in the Eastern Province. The division is a part of Security Forces Headquarters – East and has three brigades.
