= 22 Division (Sri Lanka) =

- Active: 23 July 1997 – present
- Country: Sri Lanka
- Branch: Sri Lanka Army
- Part of: Security Forces Headquarters – East
- Garrison/HQ: Trincomalee, Eastern Province

The 22 Division is a division of the Sri Lanka Army. Established on 23 July 1997, the division is currently based in Trincomalee in the Eastern Province. The division is a part of Security Forces Headquarters – East and has four brigades.
