= Sri Lanka Army =

Land force branch of the Sri Lankan armed forces

- ශ්‍රී ලංකා යුද්ධ හමුදාව (Sinhala) இலங்கை இராணுவம் (Tamil)
- Emblem of the Sri Lanka Army
- Founded: 1881
- Country: Sri Lanka
- Type: Army
- Role: Land warfare
- Size: 150,000 personnel
- Part of: Sri Lanka Armed Forces
- Headquarters: Army Headquarters, Sri Jayawardenapura Kotte
- Mottos: Latin: Pro Patria "For the Fatherland"
- Colours: Gold, blue and orange
- Anniversaries: Army Day: 10 October
- Engagements: Second Boer War; World War I: World War II; Easter Sunday Raid; Cocos Islands mutiny; 1971 JVP Insurrection; 1987–89 JVP Insurrection; Sri Lankan Civil War; Operation Yukthiya; Haitian conflict
- Decorations: Military awards and decorations of Sri Lanka
- Website: www.army.lk

Commanders
- Commander-in-Chief: Anura Kumara Dissanayake (President of Sri Lanka)
- Commander of the Army: Lieutenant General Nilantha Premaratne
- Chief of Staff of the Army: Major General Sampath Fernando
- Deputy Chief of Staff of the Army: Major General K.J.N.M.P.K. Nawarathna
- Notable commanders: Field Marshal Sarath Fonseka; General Sepala Attygalle; General Hamilton Wanasinghe; Major General Bertram Heyn; Major General Anton Muttukumaru

Insignia
- Flag

- Presidential Colour

The Sri Lanka Army (Sinhala: ශ්‍රී ලංකා යුද්ධ හමුදාව, romanised: Śrî Langkâ Yudha Hamudâwa; Tamil: இலங்கை இராணுவம், romanised: Ilankai iraṇuvam) is the oldest and largest of the Sri Lanka Armed Forces. The army was officially established as the Ceylon Army in 1949, though the army traces its roots back to 1881 when Ceylon Light Infantry Volunteers was created; the army was renamed as the 'Sri Lanka Army' when Sri Lanka became a republic in 1972. In 2024, the Army had approximately 150,000 personnel.

The Army Headquarters is situated in Sri Jayawardenepura Kotte; Commander of the Army is the highest appointment in the army who commands the army and is assisted by the Chief of Staff of the Army and Deputy Chief of Staff of the Army. The Commander-in-Chief of the Sri Lanka Armed Forces is the President of Sri Lanka, who heads the National Security Council through the Ministry of Defence, which is charged with formulating, executing defence policy and procurements for the armed forces.

== Background ==
=== Pre Anuradhapura period to the Transitional period ===
Repeated incursions by South Indians, particularly the Cholas, into Sri Lankan territory occurred throughout the next few centuries and led to the engagement of the rival forces in battle. In one famous encounter, Sinhalese King Dutugamunu (161–37 BC) raised an army of eleven thousand in his battle against the Chola invader Elara, whom he eventually defeated. Dutugemunu's organisational skills, bravery and chivalry are famous and his battles have gone down in history as outstanding offensive operations.

Other Sri Lankan monarchs whose military achievements stand out include Gajabahu I (113–35), who sailed to India to bring back his captured soldiers, and Dhatusena (455–73) who is credited with repulsing numerous Indian invasions and for organising a naval build-up to deter seaborne attacks. He also had the foresight to cover his defences with artillery. Vijayabahu I (1055–1110) was another warrior king who dislodged Indian invaders and united the country. Parakramabahu the Great (1153–1186) was an outstanding monarch of the Polonnaruwa period, and his accomplishments as a military leader and a great administrator are noteworthy. His reign included a military expedition to Burma in retaliation for indignities inflicted on his envoys and Burmese interference in the elephant trade. This marked the first overseas expedition in Sri Lankan military history. It is also reported that Parakramabahu's fame was such that his assistance was sought by South Indian rulers who were involved in internecine struggles. Another strong ruler in the Transitional period of Sri Lanka was Parakramabahu VI, who defeated Indian invaders, united the island and ruled it from capital Kotte. Although the known epigraphical records do not indicate that the Sri Lankan rulers had a full-time standing army at their disposal, there is evidence supported by legend, designation, name, place and tradition that prove there were 'stand-by' equestrian, elephant, and infantry divisions to ensure royal authority at all times. Militias were raised as the necessity arose, and the soldiers returned to their pursuits, mainly for farming, after their spell of military duty.

=== Transitional period ===
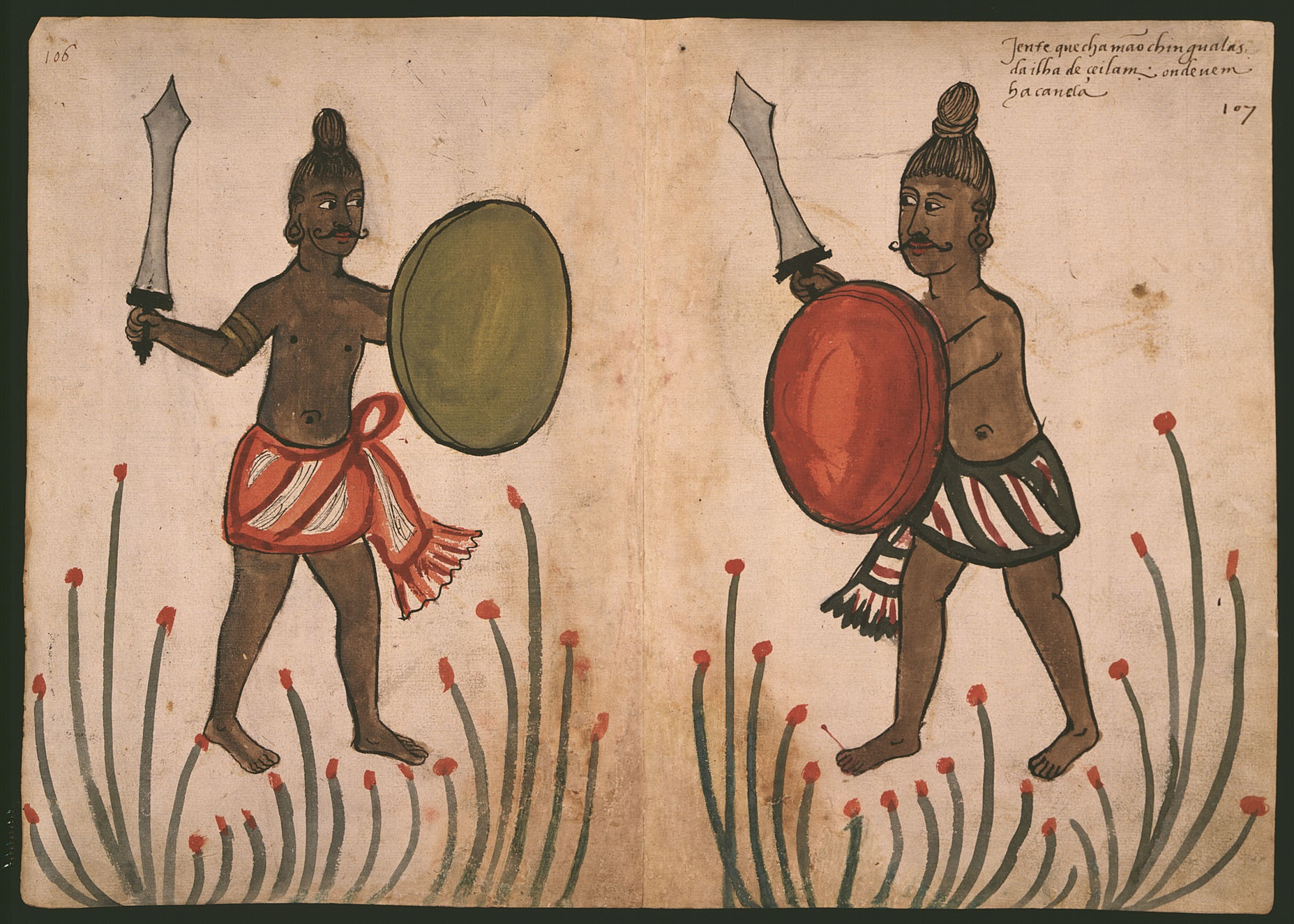
A Portuguese illustration of Sinhalese warriors, produced c. 1540

Parts of Sri Lanka came under the control of three colonial European powers, namely the Portuguese in the 16th century, the Dutch in the 17th century and the British in the 18th century. Yet, until the entire island was ceded to the British in 1815, regional kingdoms maintained most of their independent defence forces and were able to successfully repulse repeated thrusts by the European armies. However the British, unlike their counterparts, were not primarily restricted to maritime power, and thus had the capability to bring the entire island under their control and to integrate locals into the British defence forces.

At the beginning of the 16th century, modern Europe first came in contact with Sri Lanka. In 1505 a Portuguese fleet, while operating in the Indian seas against Arab traders, was blown off course and landed at Galle, on the southern coast of the island. In 1517 the Portuguese re-appeared, and with the consent of the Sinhalese King established a trading post in Colombo. Having initiated contact with Sri Lanka as traders, the Portuguese soon made themselves political masters of the western seaboard. Numerous forts were soon established, and features of European civilisation was introduced.

The Portuguese are credited with the introduction of European-style fortresses to Sri Lanka during this era. Although some locals already possessed military training and fighting experience, there is no evidence that the Portuguese employed local inhabitants into their own forces. Thus the Portuguese were forced to restrict their presence in the island due to their small numbers and their efforts were more focused toward projecting maritime power.

In 1602 Dutch explorers first landed in Sri Lanka. By 1658 they had completely ousted the Portuguese from the coastal regions of the island. Much like the Portuguese, they did not employ locals in their military and preferred to live in isolation, pursuing their interests in trade and commerce. Like the Portuguese, they defended their forts with their own forces, but unlike the Portuguese, Dutch forces employed Swiss and Malay mercenaries. The Dutch Forts in Jaffna, Galle, Matara, Batticaloa and Trincomalee were sturdily built and are considered a tribute to their military engineering skills. Also, like the Portuguese, the Dutch focussed on maritime power and although they had the capability to develop and use local forces, they chose to isolate themselves from the local population.

=== Kandyan period ===
The British Empire then ousted the Dutch from the coastal areas of the country, and sought to conquer the independent Kandyan Kingdom. In the face of repeated British assaults, the Kandyans were forced into a degree of guerilla warfare and fared well against their superior British adversaries.

Initially the British stationed their forces, which included naval vessels, artillery troops and infantry, to defend the island nation from other foreign powers, using the natural harbor of Trincomalee as their headquarters in Sri Lanka. In 1796, the Swiss and Malay mercenaries who were previously in the service of the Dutch were transferred to the British East India Company. While the Swiss Regiment de Meuron left in 1806 and was eventually disbanded in Canada in 1822, the Malays, who initially formed a Malay Corps, were converted into the 1st Ceylon Regiment in 1802 and placed under a British commanding officer. In the same year, the British became the first foreign power to raise a Sinhalese unit, which was named the 2nd Ceylon Regiment, also known as the Sepoy Corps.

In 1803 the 3rd Ceylon Regiment was created with Moluccans and recruits from Penang. All these regiments fought alongside British troops in the Kandyan Wars which began in 1803. Throughout the following years, more Sinhalese and Malays were recruited to these regiments, and in 1814 the 4th Regiment was raised, which was composed entirely of African troops. It was later renamed as the Ceylon Rifle Regiment. Eventually, the Kandyan Kingdom was ceded to the British in 1815, and with that they gained control over the whole island. Resistance to British occupation cropped up almost instantly. During the first half-century of occupation, the British faced a number of uprisings, and were forced to maintain a sizable army in order to guarantee their control over the island. After the Matale Rebellion led by Puran Appu in 1848, in which a number of Sinhalese recruits defected to the side of the rebels, the recruitment of Sinhalese to the British forces was temporarily halted.

== History ==
=== Ceylon Volunteers ===
On 1 April 1881 by a proclamation issued by the Governor of Ceylon, a Volunteer Force was raised in Ceylon. It was designated the Ceylon Light Infantry Volunteers (CLIV) in an attempt to compensated for the disbandment of the Ceylon Rifle Regiment in 1874. The Ceylon Light Infantry Volunteers was originally administered as a single regiment. However, over the years various sections of the volunteers grew large enough to become independent regiments. The different units that emerged from the Volunteer Force were the

- Cadet Battalion Ceylon Light Infantry
- Ceylon Artillery Volunteers
- Ceylon Engineers
- Ceylon Mounted Infantry (CMI)
- Ceylon Planters Rifle Corps (CPRC)
- Ceylon Supply & Transport Corps
- Ceylon Volunteer Medical Corps

These volunteers saw active service when a contingent of the Ceylon Mounted Infantry (CMI) in 1900, and a contingent of the Ceylon Planters Rifle Corps (CPRC) in 1902, took part in the Second Boer War in South Africa. Their services were recognised by the presentation in 1902 of a colour to the CMI, and a presentation in 1904 of a banner to the CPRC.

=== Ceylon Defence Force Ordinance No. 8 of 1910 ===
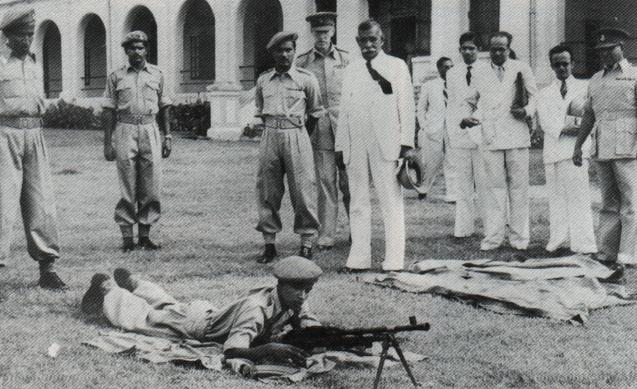
First Prime Minister of Independent Sri Lanka D. S. Senanayake visiting the 1st battalion of the CLI at the Echelon Square and watching volunteers being trained to handle light machine guns.

In 1910, with the enactment of the Ceylon Defence Force Ordinance No. 8 of 1910, the Ceylon Defence Force (CDF) was formed bring under it all volunteer units for administrative, training and logistics purposes. It continued to grow throughout the early period of the 20th century.

During the First World War, many volunteers from the Defence Force travelled to Great Britain and joined the British Army, and many of them were killed in action. One of them mentioned by Sir Arthur Conan Doyle was Private Jacotine of the CLI, who was the last man left alive in his unit at the Battle of Lys, and who continued to fight for 20 minutes before he was killed.

In 1922, the CDF was honoured by the presentation of the King's and Regimental colours to the Ceylon Light Infantry (CLI).

In 1939, the CDF was mobilised and an enormous expansion took place which required the raising of new units such as the Ceylon Signals Corps, the Auxiliary Territorial Service (Ceylon) and also the Colombo Town Guard, which had been previously disbanded, but was later re-formed to meet military requirements. During the Second World War, Britain assumed direct control over the Armed Forces of Ceylon. At the end of World War II, CDF which had increased in size during the war began demobilisation.

=== Army Act No. 17 of 1949 ===
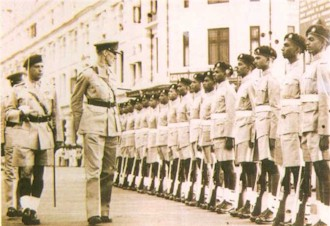
Brigadier James Sinclair, Earl of Caithness inspecting a guard of honour wearing khaki drill.

In 1948, Sri Lanka gained independence from Britain, becoming a Dominion within the Commonwealth and a year earlier Ceylon entered into the bi-lateral Anglo-Ceylonese Defence Agreement of 1947. This was followed by the Army Act No. 17 of 1949 which was passed by Parliament on April 11, 1949, and formalised in Gazette Extraordinary No. 10028 of October 10, 1949 marked the creation of the Ceylon Army, consisting of a regular and a volunteer force, the later being the successor of the disbanded CDF. Therefore, October 10, 1949, is considered the day the Ceylon Army was raised, and as such October 10 is celebrated annually as Army Day. Brigadier James Sinclair, Earl of Caithness was appointed as Commandant of the Ceylon Army. The Defence Agreement of 1947 provided the assurance that British would come to the aid of Ceylon in the event it was attacked by a foreign power and provided British military advisers to build up the country's military. In November, a Ceylon Army Guard takes over duties at Echelon Barracks from the Guard of the British Army.

The Army Headquarters, Ceylon was established in Colombo, with a General Staff Branch, an Adjutant General Branch, a Quartermaster General Branch and a Pay and Records Branch. Soon after the Headquarters, Ceylon Volunteer Force was established. The initial requirement was to raise an artillery regiment, an engineer squadron, an infantry battalion, a medical unit, and a service corps company. For much of the 1950s the army was preoccupied with the task of building itself and training existing and new personnel. To this aim the British Army Training Team (BATT) advisory group carried out training for ex-members of the CDF within the Ceylon Army, field rank officers were sent to the British Army Staff College, Camberley and some attached to units of the British Army of the Rhine to gain field experience. Newly recruited officer cadets were sent for training at Royal Military Academy, Sandhurst, stating with 10 officer cadets in 1950, which continued until the 1968 and both officers and other ranks were sent to specialist training courses in Britain, India, Pakistan and Malaya. There were no formations and all units were structured to directly function under the Army Headquarters. However temporary field headquarters were to be formed at the time requirement arose.

Due to a lack of any major external threats, the growth of the army was slow, and the primary duties of the army quickly moved towards internal security by the mid-1950s, the same time as the first Ceylonese Army Commander Major General Anton Muttukumaru took command of the army. The first internal security operation of the Ceylon Army began in 1952, code named Operation Monty to counter the influx of illegal South Indian immigrants brought in by smugglers on the north-western coast, in support of Royal Ceylon Navy coastal patrols and police operations. This was expanded and renamed as Task Force Anti Illicit Immigration (TaFII) in 1963 and continued up to 1981 when it was disbanded. The Army was mobilised to help the police to restore peace under provincial emergency regulations during the 1953 hartal, the 1956 Gal Oya Valley riots and in 1958 it was deployed for the first time under emergency regulations throughout the island during the 1958 Riots.

During the 1950s and 1960s the army was called upon to carry to essential services when the workers went on strike which were organised by the left-wing parties and trade unions for various reasons, the most notable was the 1961 Colombo Port strike, during which ships threatened to bypass Colombo port and the country almost starved. To counter these common strikes several units were formed, who were employed in development work when there were no strikes. New regiments were formed, which included the Ceylon Armoured Corps, Ceylon Sinha Regiment and the Ceylon Pioneer Corps.

In 1962 several senior officers attempted a military coup, which was stopped hours before it was launched. Thereafter the government mistrusted the military and reduced the size and growth of the army, especially the volunteer force, disbanding several units and forming the Gemunu Watch.

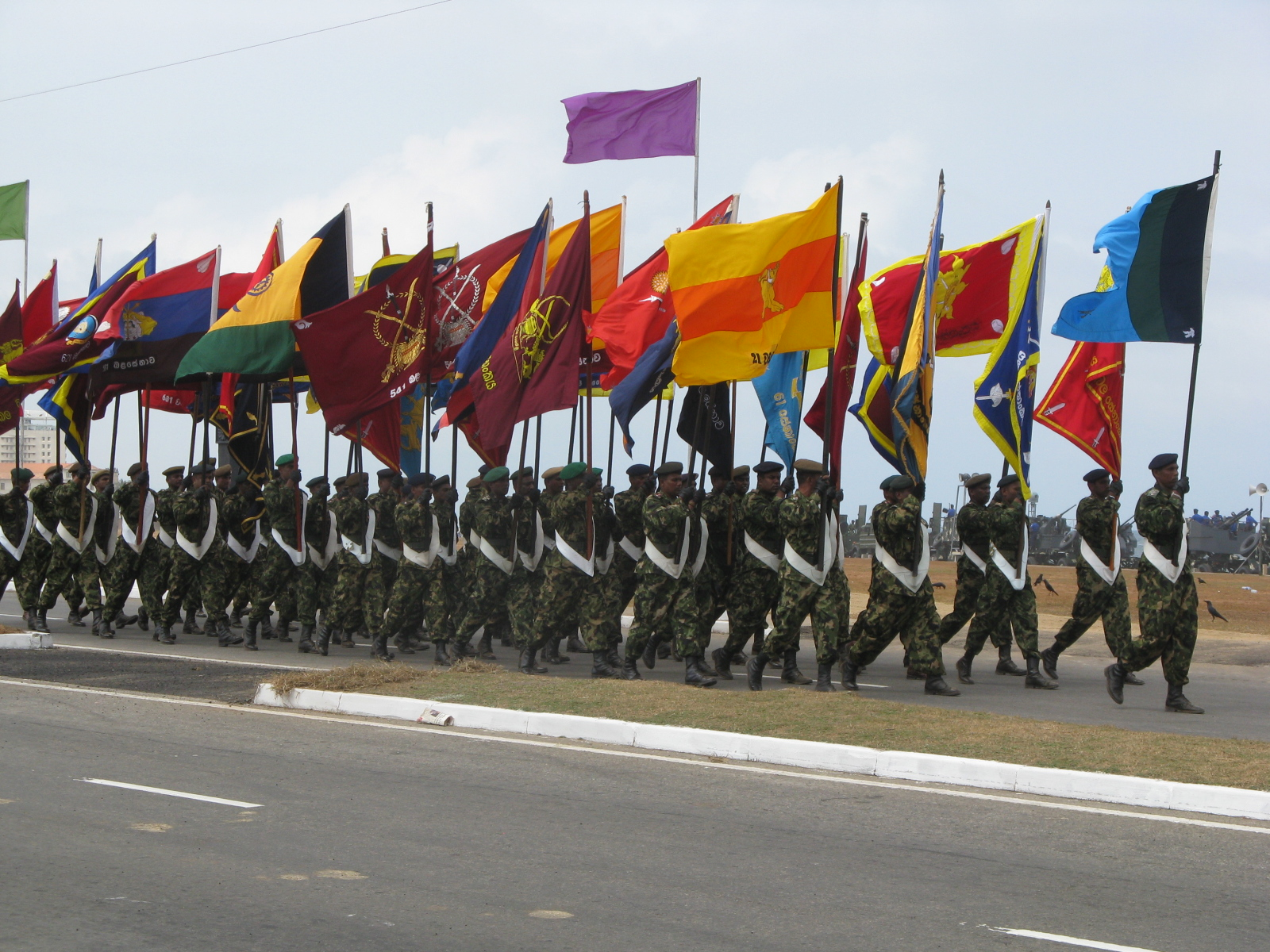
Sri Lanka Army flags

In 1971, the Army found itself facing a full blown insurgency, when the JVP Insurrection broke out in April 1971. Having been caught by surprise, as a result of failure to comprehend the magnitude of the insurgency from intelligence reports. Although completely ill-prepared to deal with an insurgency, lacking weapons, ammunition, equipment and training; the army responded quickly and successfully defeated the insurgency by the Janatha Vimukthi Peramuna by mid 1971.

In May 1972, when Ceylon was proclaimed a republic and changed its name from the Dominion of Ceylon to the Republic of Sri Lanka, all Army units were renamed accordingly.

By the late 1970s the army was confronted with a new conflict, this time with Tamil militant groups in the north of the island. The Liberation Tigers of Tamil Eelam (LTTE) emerged as the prominent of these Tamil militant groups. The war escalated to the point where India intervened as a peacekeeping force. This was later seen as a tactical error, as the Indian Peace Keeping Force united nationalist elements such as the JVP to politically support the LTTE in their call to evict the IPKF. This led to a second insurgency by the JVP, forcing the army to deploy its forces in the south of the island and to fight on two fronts between 1987 and 1989. The 1980s saw a massive expansion of the army from 15,000 personnel to over 30,000. New regiments were raised, while others were expanded with new battalions. New weapons and equipment were introduced as the war shifted from counter-insurgency to conventional warfare tactics, with multi battalion, brigade and division scale operations. New regiments were formed which included the Commando Regiment, Special Forces Regiment, Mechanized Infantry Regiment, Gajaba Regiment, Vijayabahu Infantry Regiment, Military Intelligence Corps, Sri Lanka Army Women's Corps, Sri Lanka Rifle Corps and the Sri Lanka National Guard.

The war with the LTTE was halted several times for peace negotiations, the last of which following the signing of a ceasefire agreement in 2002 with the help of international mediation. However, renewed violence broke out in December 2005 and following the collapse of peace talks, the Army has been involved in the heavy fighting that has resumed in the north and east of the country.

Since 1980, the army has undertaken many operations against the LTTE rebels. The major operations conducted by the army eventually led to the recapture of Jaffna and other rebel strongholds. On 19 May 2009, the Sri Lanka Army declared victory as they found the dead body of LTTE leader Velupillai Prabhakaran. This marked the end of the war, with the LTTE ceasing to exist in Sri Lanka as a result of prolonged military offensives conducted by Sri Lanka army. The Sri Lankan Armed Forces, including the army, have been accused of committing war crimes during the war, particularly during the final stages. A panel of experts appointed by UN Secretary-General Ban Ki-moon to advise him on the issue of accountability with regard to any alleged violations of international human rights and humanitarian law during the final stages of the civil war found "credible allegations" which, if proven, indicated that war crimes and crimes against humanity were committed by the Sri Lankan Armed Forces and the Tamil Tigers.

== Deployments ==
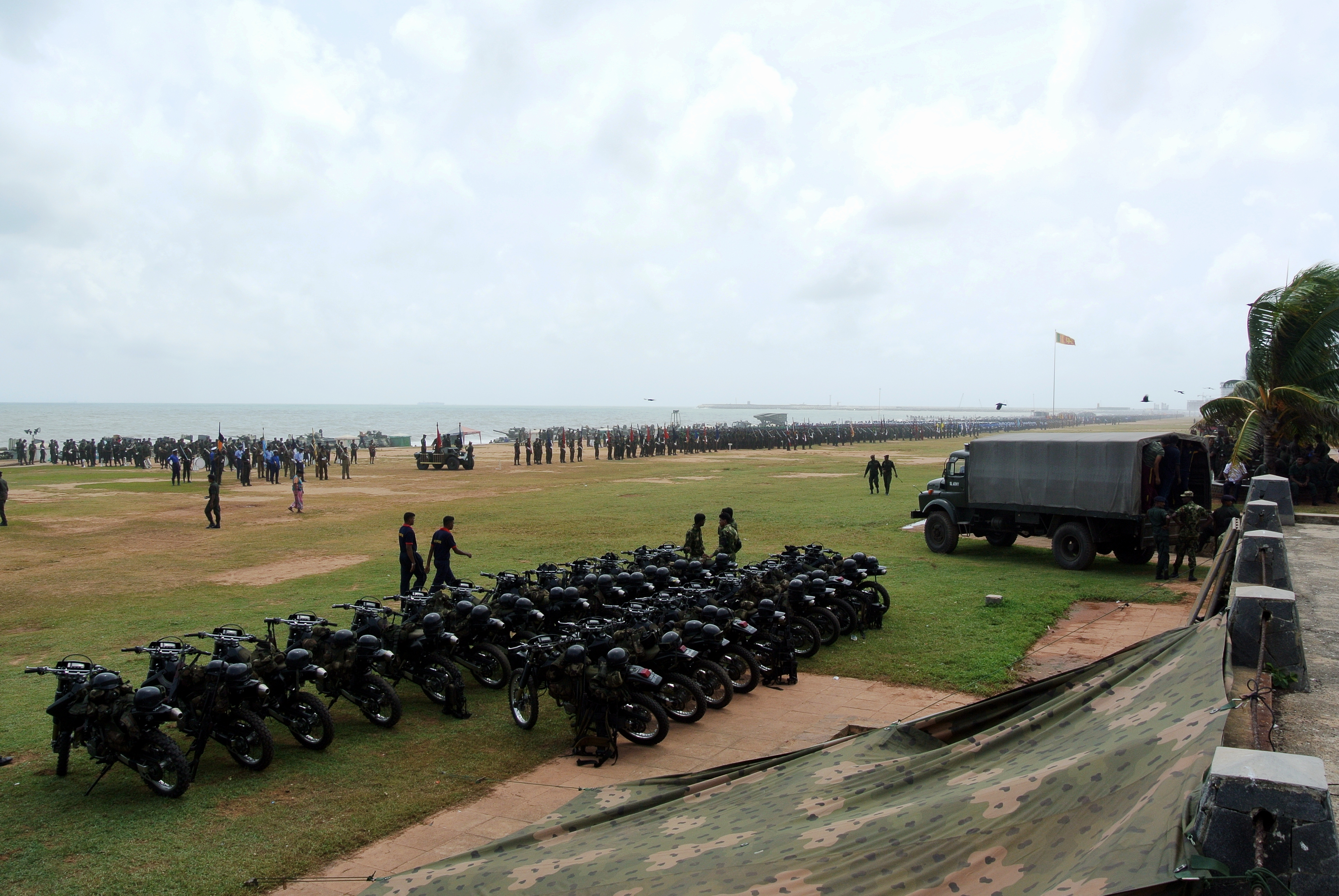
Military gathering on Galle Face Green in Colombo

As of present, the bulk of the Sri Lankan Army is deployed for domestic defensive and combat operations, while a sizable foreign deployment is maintained.

=== Domestic ===
Due to the Sri Lankan Civil War the army has been on a constant mobilised (including volunteers) state since the 1980s. The majority of the army has been deployed in the North and Eastern provinces of the country, which includes 14 Divisions coming under six operational headquarters and 2 independent Divisions and several independent Brigades. The army is also based in other parts of the island for internal security including a Division for the defence of the capital.

=== Foreign ===
The Sri Lanka Army currently participates in several major overseas deployments:

- Haiti - 900 personnel currently deployed for Gang Suppression Force
- Lebanon – a mechanised infantry company with combat support personnel in the United Nations Interim Force in Lebanon since November 2010.
- South Sudan – Sri Lanka Army's entry into South Sudan in 2014 as the newest member in the UN peace keeping family, marks a milestone in the Army history. Sri Lanka became the first country to deploy a surge contingent in South Sudan.Army maintains a SRIMED Level 2 Hospital, manned entirely by Sri Lanka's Sri Lanka Army Medical Corps personnel.
- Mali – an infantry battalion with support personnel that has been deployed as part of the United Nations Multidimensional Integrated Stabilization Mission in Mali in 2016

=== Peacekeeping ===
The Sri Lanka Army has taken part in two peacekeeping missions with United Nations over the course of its history. First assignment was in the Congo (ONUC) (1960–1963). Most recently, following the signing of a ceasefire agreement was signed between the government and the LTTE in 2002, Sri Lankan forces were invited by the United Nations to be part of the UN peacekeeping force in Haiti. In the process of the peacekeeping operations, two soldiers were killed in a raid in Petit-Goave. After over 6 months of service, the first contingent of the peacekeeping force returned to Sri Lanka on May 17, 2005. In December 2007, 7th rotation of the Sri Lankan contingent had been deployed with a force of 991 officers and other ranks, many of those deployed have been awarded the United Nations Medal for their services. In November 2007, 114 members of the 950 member Sri Lankan Army peacekeeping mission in Haiti was accused of sexual misconduct and abuse which resulted in 108 members, including three officers, being sent back after being implicated in alleged misconduct and sexual abuse where sex was exchanged for money and valuable items, with some acts considered rape as they involved those under 18. In January 2019, a Sri Lankan army officer and trooper on peace keeping duty in Mali were killed and three more wounded when their convoy came under an IED attack. The incident prompted the army to accelerate its Avalon program.

Sri Lanka Army's newest contingent of 243 professionally-trained Army personnel in the Combat Convoy Company (CCC), well-prepared to serve in the United Nations (UN) Multidimensional Integrated Stabilization Mission in Mali (MINUSMA) left the island on 21 April 2021.

== Organisation structure ==
The professional head of the army is the Commander of the Army. He is assisted by the Chief of Staff of the Sri Lanka Army and a Deputy Chief of Staff. The Commandant of the Volunteer Force is head of the Army Volunteer Force and is responsible for the administration and recruitment of all reserve units and personnel. The Army Headquarters, housed in the Defence Headquarters Complex in Sri Jayawardenapura Kotte is the main administrative and the operational headquarters of the Sri Lanka Army.

=== Administrative ===
The Army Headquarters is divided into a number of branches, namely the General Staff (GS) branch responsible for coordination of operations and training and the Adjutant General's (AGs) branch responsible for personnel administration, welfare, medical services, and rehabilitation. The Quarter Master General's (QMGs) branch is responsible for feeding, transport, movement, and construction and maintenance. The Master General of Ordnance's (MGOs) branch is responsible for procurement and maintenance of vehicles and special equipment. The Military Secretary's Branch is responsible for handling all matters pertaining to officers such as promotions, postings and discipline. Each branch is headed by an officer in the rank of Major General who is directly responsible to the Commander of the Army for the smooth functioning of the Branch. Under each Branch, there are several Directorates, each headed by a Brigadier.

The headquarters of field formations each have its own staff. For instance a divisional headquarters is divided into a GS branch as an AQ branch, each headed by a Colonel and is responsible for operations & training and administration & logistics respectively. Similarly, a Brigade Major and Major AQ is responsible for operations and administration in a brigade.

Like the Indian Army, the Sri Lanka Army has largely retained the British-style regimental system that it inherited upon independence. The individual regiments (such as the Sri Lanka Light Infantry and the Sri Lanka Sinha Regiment) operate independently and recruit their own members. Officers tend to remain in a single battalion throughout their careers. The infantry battalion, the basic unit of organisation in field operations, includes five companies of four platoons each. Typical platoon has three squads (sections) of ten personnel each. In addition to the basic infantry forces, a commando regiment was also established in 1986. Support for the infantry is provided by an armoured regiment, five reconnaissance regiments, three mechanised infantry regiments, five field artillery regiments, a rocket artillery regiment, three commando regiments, three special forces regiments, six field engineering regiments, five signals battalions, a medical corps, and a variety of logistics units.

=== Regiments and corps ===
Name	Headquarters/Regimental Centre	Regular Units	Volunteer Units	Headquarters Units
Armoured Corps	Rock House Army Camp	5	2	0
Artillery	Panagoda Cantonment	9	2	0
Engineers	Panagoda Cantonment	10	2	0
Signals Corps	Panagoda Cantonment	10	1	1
Light Infantry	Panagoda Cantonment	16	6	1
Sinha Regiment	Ambepussa Camp	14	6	1
Gemunu Watch	Kuruwita Army Camp	15	6	1
Gajaba Regiment	Saliyapura Camp	14	6	1
Vijayabahu Infantry Regiment	Boyagane Camp	15	6	1
Mechanized Infantry Regiment	Dambulla	4	1	0
Commando Regiment	Ganemulla	4	0	1
Special Forces Regiment	Naula	4	0	0
Military Intelligence Corps	Polhengoda	4	2	0
Engineer Services Regiment	Panagoda Cantonment	7	9	0
Service Corps	Panagoda Cantonment	7	2	0
Medical Corps	Boralesgamuwa	4	1	0
Ordnance Corps	Dombagoda	6	1	0
Electrical and Mechanical Engineers	Slave Island	7	1	0
Corps of Military Police	Polhengoda	7	0	0
General Service Corps	Panagoda Cantonment	3	3	0
Women's Corps	Borella	2	2	0
Rifle Corps	Pallekele	0	2	0
Pioneer Corps	Matugama	0	2	0
National Guard	Kurunegala	0	19	1

=== Operational command ===
Organised and controlled by the Army General Staff at Army HQ, various formations are raised from time to time to suit various security requirements and operations in the country and overseas. The Army at present has deployed 12 Divisions, 7 task forces and several independent brigades. Except for the 11 Division based at the Panagoda Cantonment which is responsible for the maintenance of capability for the defence of the capital, all other divisions, task forces and brigades are deployed for operations in the Northern and Eastern provinces of Sri Lanka, coming under five regional commands known as Security Forces Headquarters, which are the Security Forces Headquarters Jaffna (SFHQ-J), Wanni (SFHQ-W), East (SFHQ-E), Mullaittivu (SFHQ-MLT), West (SFHQ-W) and Central (SFHQ-C). One Security Forces Headquarters, the SFHQ-KLN was disbanded in 2021.

Each SFHQ and most divisions are commanded by a General Officer Commanding in the rank of Major General. A SFHQ has several divisions under its command and each division is further divided into brigades. Each brigade is commanded by an officer in the rank of Brigadier and has a number of Infantry battalions, support arms (Artillery, Engineers and Signals) and support services (Service Corps, Engineering Services, Ordnance Corps, Electrical and Mechanical Engineers) under assigned to it. There are also several administrative brigades (Artillery Brigade, Armoured Brigade, etc.) and the Air Mobile Brigade.

In other parts of the country, there are Area and Sub-Area Headquarters. Armour, Artillery, Engineers and Signals Units are grouped under Brigade Headquarters of their own arm; Armoured Brigade, Artillery Brigade and so on.

=== Formations ===
Army Headquarters Formation

- Independent Brigade HQ
- Commander Security Unit

SLAVF Headquarters

1 Corps, based in Kilinochchi

- Reserve Strike Force
  - 53 Division, based at Inamaluwa, Dambulla
    - Air Mobile Brigade
    - 532 Brigade
    - 533 Brigade
  - 58 Division
    - 581 Brigade
    - 582 Brigade
    - 583 Brigade
- Special Operations Force
  - Commando Brigade
  - Special Forces Brigade

Security Forces Headquarters - Jaffna (SFHQ-J)

- 51 Division, based in Jaffna
  - 511 Brigade
  - 512 Brigade
  - 513 Brigade
- 52 Division, based in the Jaffna Peninsula
  - 521 Brigade
  - 522 Brigade
  - 523 Brigade
- 55 Division, based in Elephant Pass Military Base, Jaffna Peninsula
  - 551 Brigade
  - 552 Brigade
  - 553 Brigade

Security Forces Headquarters - Wanni (SFHQ-W)

- Area Headquarters Mannar, Mannar
- 21 Division
- 54 Division
- 56 Division
- 61 Division
- 62 Division

Security Forces Headquarters - East (SFHQ-E)

- 22 Division, based in Trincomalee
- 23 Division, based in Poonani, Batticaloa District
- 24 Division

Security Forces Headquarters – Mullaitivu (SFHQ-MLT)

- 59 Division, operating in the Mullaittivu District
- 64 Division, operating in the Mullaittivu District
- 68 Division, Kombavil, Mullaittivu District

Security Forces Headquarters – West (SFHQ-W)

- 14 Division, based in Colombo, Western Province (formerly Operation Command Colombo)
  - 141 Brigade, based in Gampaha
  - 142 Brigade, based in Colombo and Kalutara
  - 143 Brigade, based in Puttalam and Kurunegala
- 61 Division

Security Forces Headquarters – Central (SFHQ-C)

- 11 Division
  - 111 Brigade based in Kandy
  - 112 Brigade, based in Badulla
- 12 Division
  - 121 Brigade, based in Buttala
  - 122 Brigade, based in Weerawila

Army Training Command

Logistic Command

Specialist Formations

- Engineers Division
- Armoured Brigade
- Artillery Brigade
- Mechanized Infantry Brigade
- Signals Brigade
- Corps of Agriculture and Livestock

== Training ==
At the formation of the Ceylon Army in 1949, the need to train a standing army was felt strongly since the Ceylon Defence Force had operated on a regimental training model to maintain the efficiency of its volunteers culminating with the annual two week training camp at the garrison town of Diyatalawa, in the Badulla District which became the traditional training grounds for the newly formed army. The Army Recruit Training Depot was established in Diyatalawa in 1950 and later renamed as the Army Training Centre. Officer cadets were sent to the Royal Military Academy Sandhurst, along with specialised training at trade schools of the British Army, while officers of field rank were sent to the Staff College, Camberley and to the Royal College of Defence Studies. With the economic limitations in the 1960s, focus was given for local training in order to save foreign exchange. The army initiated basic officer training at the Army Training Centre in 1968. With the rapid expansion of the army in the 1980s and 1990s saw the establishment of local specialist and trade schools, along with staff colleges and a defence university. At present the Army Training Command (ARTRAC) with its headquarters at Diyatalawa formulates all training doctrine of the army and all its training centres. ARTRAC directs all army training establishments, regimental training establishments and battalion training schools.

All pre-commissioning training for officers are carried out at the Sri Lanka Military Academy (SLMA) (formally the Army Training Centre) and at the Volunteer Force Training School (VFTS) situated in Diyatalawa. The officer cadets graduating from SLMA are commissioned as officers in the regular and volunteer forces, while VFTS conducts shorter commissioning courses for prospective officers for the volunteer force and the National Cadet Corps. The course for officer cadets runs for ninety weeks and includes training in tactics and administration which helps prepare the cadets to take up the positions of platoon and company commanders. The course consisted of military and academic subjects and also trained the cadets physically. The course helps to promote leadership qualities and the understanding of each one's role as an officer and a servant of the state. Due to the lack of officers within the lower levels, the training process was sped up in the 1980s by developing a short commission course. The cadets were given a training of fifty-six weeks and devoted themselves to continue their careers in the military with the mandatory ten years of service for regular army officers and five years of service for volunteer officers. Once completing their basic training at SLMA, junior officers would receive specialised training at training centres which would include young officers courses in their area of specialisation followed by advanced training on weapon systems.

Selected field officers attended command and staff courses at the Army War College followed by the Command and Staff Course at the Defence Services Command and Staff College (DSCSC) at Batalanda, Makola which was established in 1997 as the Army Command and Staff College. Officers may attend specialist long courses such as the Logistics Staff Course that is conducted at the Army School of Logistics which was established in 2011. Senior field officers with the potential to advance to general officer rank are selected to attend the prestigious National Defence College (NDC) in Colombo which is the highest level of military training in Sri Lanka.

The General Sir John Kotelawala Defence University (KDU) formed in 1981 and situated in Ratmalana, fourteen kilometres south of Colombo, as only university specialising in defence studies in the island. Each year, approximately fifty cadets from all three services are admitted to the university (aged 18–22) to participate in a three-year programme of academic work and as sent to their service academies for their final year of training. In addition KDU conducts postgraduate and masters programs in defence related subjects for officers who attend staff and defence courses at DSCSC and NDC.

Training for the new recruits are carried out by the Army Training School in Maduru Oya and at several locations by training battalions, followed by additional specialised training in arms or trade at training centres such as the Infantry Training Centre in Minneriya and the Combat Training School in Ampara.

At its formation the armed forces of Sri Lanka had limited indigenous training facilities, especially in technical and advanced roles, they have depended greatly on military training provided by foreign countries. The United Kingdom played a major role in the early years following independence and have continued to be an important source of military expertise to the Sri Lankan military. Other sources include India, Pakistan, the United States, Australia and Malaysia. Additionally, in an agreement reached in 1984, Israeli security personnel (reportedly from Shin Bet, the Israeli counterespionage and internal security organisation) trained army officers in counterinsurgency techniques. With the rapid expansion of the army, in recent years it has expanded its training facilities locally.

The Sri Lankan Army has also provided special training to the United States Army on their request as well as many other countries in military education regarding civilian rescue, jungle combat, and guerilla warfare etc.

=== Training establishments ===
Training Centres

1. Sri Lanka Military Academy (SLMA)
2. Army War College (AWC)
3. Army School of Logistics (ASL)
4. Volunteer Force Training School (VFTS)
5. Army Training School (ATS)
6. Infantry Training Centre (ITC)
7. Combat Training School (CTS)
8. Army Physical Education Centre (APEC)
9. Marksman Sniper Training School (MSTS)
10. Centre for Army Vocational Training (CAVT)
11. Institute of Peacekeeping Support Operations Training Sri Lanka (IPSOT-SL)

Regimental Training Centres

1. Armoured Corps Training Centre
2. School of Artillery
3. Sri Lanka School of Military Engineering
4. Sri Lanka Signal Corps Training School
5. Mechanized Infantry Training Centre
6. Commando Regiment Training School
7. Commando Regimental Special Warfare Training School
8. Special Forces Training School
9. Special Forces Combat Diving Training School
10. Special Forces Jungle Warfare Training School
11. Military Intelligence Training School
12. Airmobile Training School
13. Engineer Services Trade School
14. Army Service Corps Training School
15. Sri Lanka Army Military School of Nursing
16. Sri Lanka Army Ordnance School
17. Sri Lanka Electrical And Mechanical Engineers School
18. Sri Lanka Corps of Military Police School
19. Sri Lanka Army General Service Corps Trade School

== Personnel ==
As of 2024 the Sri Lanka Army had 150,000 personnel. In 2023 the army had 200,783 personnel and the number was reduced to 150,000 in 2024.

In late 1987, the army had a total estimated strength of up to 40,000 troops, about evenly divided between regular army personnel and reservists on active duty. The approximately 20,000 regular army troops represented a significant increase over the 1983 strength of only 12,000. Aggressive recruitment campaigns following the 1983 riots raised this number to 16,000 by early 1985. By 1990 the army had expanded to over 90,000 personnel and by 2007, it had expanded to over 120,000.

Since the Sri Lankan armed forces are all volunteer services, all personnel in the Sri Lanka Army have volunteered as regular personnel or reservists. This should not be confused with the traditional term volunteers used for reservists or reservist units. Recruitment is carried out island wide with a restrictions in the northern and eastern provinces during the civil war in those areas. The Rifle Corps is the only territorial unit that carries out recruitment from a specific area.

=== Parama Weera Vibhushanaya recipients ===
The Parama Weera Vibhushanaya is the highest award for valour awarded in the Sri Lankan armed forces. Army recipients include;

- Colonel A.F. Lafir †
- Lieutenant-Colonel Lalith Jayasinghe †
- Major G. S. Jayanath †
- Major K. A. Gamage †
- Major W.M.I.S.B. Walisundara †
- Captain Saliya Upul Aladeniya †
- Captain H. G. M. H. I. Megawarna †
- Lieutenant U. G. A. S. Samaranayake †
- Second Lieutenant K.W.T. Nissanka †
- Warrant Officer 2nd Class Pasan Gunasekera †
- Staff Sergeant H. G. S. Bandara †
- Sergeant D. M. S. Chandrasiri Bandara †
- Sergeant P.N. Suranga †
- Sergeant A.M. Anura †
- Corporal Gamini Kularatne †
- Corporal K. Chandana †
- Corporal P. M. Nilantha Pushpa Kumara †
- Corporal A. M. N. P. Abesinghe †
- Lance Corporal W. I. M. Seneviratne †
- Lance-Corporal T. G. D. R. Dayananda †
- Lance-Corporal R. M. D. M. Rathnayake †
- Lance-Corporal A. M. B. H. G. Abeyrathnebanda †
- Lance-Corporal K.G.M. Rajapaksha †

=== Notable fallen members ===
Over 23,790 Sri Lankan armed forces personnel were killed since the begin of the civil war in 1981 to its end in 2009, this includes 12 general officers killed in active duty or assassinated. 659 service personnel were killed due to the second JVP Insurrection from 1987 to 1990. 53 service personnel were killed and 323 were wounded in the first JVP Insurrection from 1971 to 1972. Notable fallen members include;

- Lt. Gen. Denzil Kobbekaduwa † – Overall Operational Commander, Northern Sector.
- Lt. Gen. Parami Kulatunga † – Former Deputy Chief of the Staff of the Army.
- Lt. Gen. Nalin Angammana † – Former GOC, 3 Division.
- Maj. Gen. Vijaya Wimalaratne † – Former Jaffna Brigade Commander.
- Maj. Gen. Lakshman 'Lucky' Wijayaratne † – Former brigade commander, 22 Brigade.
- Maj. Gen. Percy Fernando † – Former deputy GOC, 54 Division.
- Maj. Gen. Larry Wijeratne † – Former brigade commander, 51-4 Brigade.
- Maj. Gen. Susantha Mendis † – Former brigade commander, 51-2 Brigade.
- Maj. Gen. Janaka Perera – Former Chief of Staff of the Sri Lanka Army, Overall Operational Commander of Northern Sector, General Officer Commanding (GOC) of the 53 Division.
- Maj. Gen. Ananda Hamangoda † – Former brigade commander, 51-2 Brigade.
- Brig. Ariyasinghe Ariyapperuma † – Former Commander, Northern Command
- Brig. Bhathiya Jayatilleka † – former Brigade commander, 54-1 brigade
- Brig. Rohitha Neil Akmeemana † – former Brigade commander, Elephant Pass.
- Col. Tuan Nizam Muthaliff † – Former commanding officer 1st Battalion Military Intelligence Corps.
- Maj. Noel Weerakoon † – first army officer killed in action (during the 1971 Insurrection).

=== Directorate of Rehabilitation ===
The Directorate of Rehabilitation was established with the intention and focus towards the rehabilitation of Officers and Other Ranks Wounded in Action. However, with the increase of a number of casualties due to the operations, the Sri Lanka Army proceeded to utilise the services of battle casualties with the view of obtaining a productive service from these individuals. As a result, under mentioned institutes had been established.

- Ranaviru Sevana
- Ranaviru Apparels
- Abhimansala Wellness Resort 1 (Anuradhapura)
- Abhimansala Wellness Resort 2 (Kamburupitiya)
- Abhimansala Wellness Resort 3 (Panagoda)
- Ranaviru Resources Centre
- Mihindu Seth Medura

=== Women in the Sri Lanka Army ===
Making a corps for women was dreamed by former Commander of the Army General Denis Perera who became commander in October 1977. Gen. Perera sought help from the British Army's Women's Royal Army Corps and in 1978 three females were sent to Britain for officer training. They returned to Sri Lanka in August 1979 after completion of eight months of training. The Sri Lanka Army Women's Corps was officially formed on September 14, 1979, with one battalion (the 1st regular battalion).

The first three female cadets to enroll the army were K.C. Jayaweera, M.P Wijegunawardena and V.P. Senevitathna (trained in Britain) and the first batch of female cadets to be trained in Sri Lanka was commissioned from the Sri Lanka Military Academy on 18 August 1984. On 16 October 1980, ten women were recruited for N.C.O. training and were given the basic Army training at the Army Training Centre, Diyatalawa. These N.C.O.s passed out in November 1980. The three officers and ten N.C.O.s participated at the Independence Day celebrations held at the Galle Face Green for the first time in 1981 and Women's Corps has been a part of the country's Independence celebrations ever since. Lieutenant Colonel (later Brigadier) A.W. Thambiraja (male) was the first commanding officer of the 1st regular battalion (1 SLAWC) and Major K.C. Weerasekara was promoted to Lt. Col. in 1993; she was the first woman to be promoted to this rank from this corps and was also the first woman to be appointed as the commanding officer of the 1 SLAWC in 1989 in the Major rank.

The regimental centre of the corps was established on 17 November 1997 at Borella. Male Major General W.A.A. de Silva RSP USP was the first Colonel Commandant of the Regiment from 1997 to 1998 and female Lieutenant Colonel M.H.P.S. Perera, USP was the first Centre Commandant from 1998 to 2004. Major General H.I.G. Wijerathna, USP was the first female colonel commandant of this regiment who served from 2008 to 2010 and Brigadier D.T.N. Munasinghe was the second female to be appointed as the colonel commandant in 2016.

The primary aim of raising Women's Corps was to provide telephone operators, computer operators, nurses and clerks, to release the male counterparts to the battle field. However, women soldiers were also employed on field duties later. Six more battalions were created in the 1990s and 2000s.

Over 25 female soldiers had been killed in action with the first in 1997.

In 2009, one female captain and two female corporals became members of the Sri Lanka Army Commando Regiment after completing commando training.

In 2021, a special 'Women Corps Quick Reaction Rider Team' was formed to operate in an emergency situation in Jaffna; female soldiers were in motorcycles.

Apart from the Women's Corps women are now recruited in the Sri Lanka Signals Corps, Military Intelligence Corps, Sri Lanka Army Medical Corps, Sri Lanka Corps of Military Police, Sri Lanka Army General Service Corps, Corps of Engineer Services, Sri Lanka Army Ordnance Corps and Sri Lanka Army Service Corps.

== Equipment ==
In the 1980s, the army expanded its range of weapons from the original stock of World War II-era British Lee–Enfield rifles, Sten Submachine guns, Vickers machine guns, Bren machine guns, 6-inch coastal guns, Daimler Armoured Cars, Bren Gun Carriers, 40 mm anti-aircraft guns, 3.7-inch heavy anti-aircraft guns and 4.2-inch heavy mortars as well as post war Alvis Saladins, Alvis Saracen, Ferrets and Shorland S55s. New sources of weaponry in the mid-to-late 1970s included the Soviet Union, Yugoslavia, and China – countries with which the leftist Bandaranaike government had close ties.

To meet the threat posed by predominantly the LTTE, Army purchased modern military hardware including 50-calibre heavy machine guns, rocket-propelled grenade (RPG) launchers, Night Vision Devices, 106 mm recoilless rifles, 60 mm and 81 mm mortars, 40 mm grenade launchers and some sniper rifles. Refurbished armoured personnel carriers were added to the 'A' vehicle fleet of the 1st Reconnaissance Regiment, Sri Lanka Armoured Corps. These APCs enabled the Armoured Corps to have their own assault troops to provide close contact protection to their Alvis Saladin and Ferret Scout Cars which were vulnerable to anti-tank weapons. The capability of the Sri Lanka Artillery was enhanced with the introduction of Ordnance QF 25 pounders. Chinese-made 122 mm, 130 mm and 152 mm howitzers were introduced to the Sri Lankan Army in 1995 and 1998 whilst 122 mm Multi Barrel Rocket Launchers (MBRL), were first used in 2000 by the Sri Lanka Army.

Though the weapons were obsolete at the time of purchase, security forces found them to be successful in combat. Land mines proved to be the most lethal threat to personnel, as a number of mines were deployed against unprotected trucks and buses by the LTTE in the northern and eastern Provinces. These land mines weighed approximately 50–100 kg, against which no armoured vehicle that the SLA possessed was able to withstand the blast effect. Consequently, Armscor Buffels – South African armoured personnel carriers constructed on a Unimog chassis – were imported in quantity. By 1987 Sri Lanka's indigenous Unicorn APC had been engineered from the Buffel, followed by the improved Unibuffel class. Both the Unicorn and the Unibuffel are assembled by the Sri Lanka Electrical & Mechanical Engineers (SLEME).

In recent years, Sri Lanka has become increasingly reliant on China for weapons. This is due to most European nations and the United States Governments passing regulations about the selling of weaponry to nations which are suffering or suffered from internal conflict. However the United States has expressed its intent to maintain military training assistance. Recently the Sri Lankan Army started to produce locally weapons such as a new multiple rocket launcher, with 10 barrels and a firing range of 20 km. The SLEME is also producing vehicles for transport, the UniCOLT series trucks, and landmine-resistant vehicles, the UniAIMOVs and the UniAVALONs. In 2020, the Army shipped several modernised Unibuffels to the Sri Lankan forces who are serving in a peacekeeping mission in Mali.

Sri Lanka also continues to receive a variety of weapons from Britain, India, Japan, Pakistan, Israel and other former suppliers.

=== Armour ===
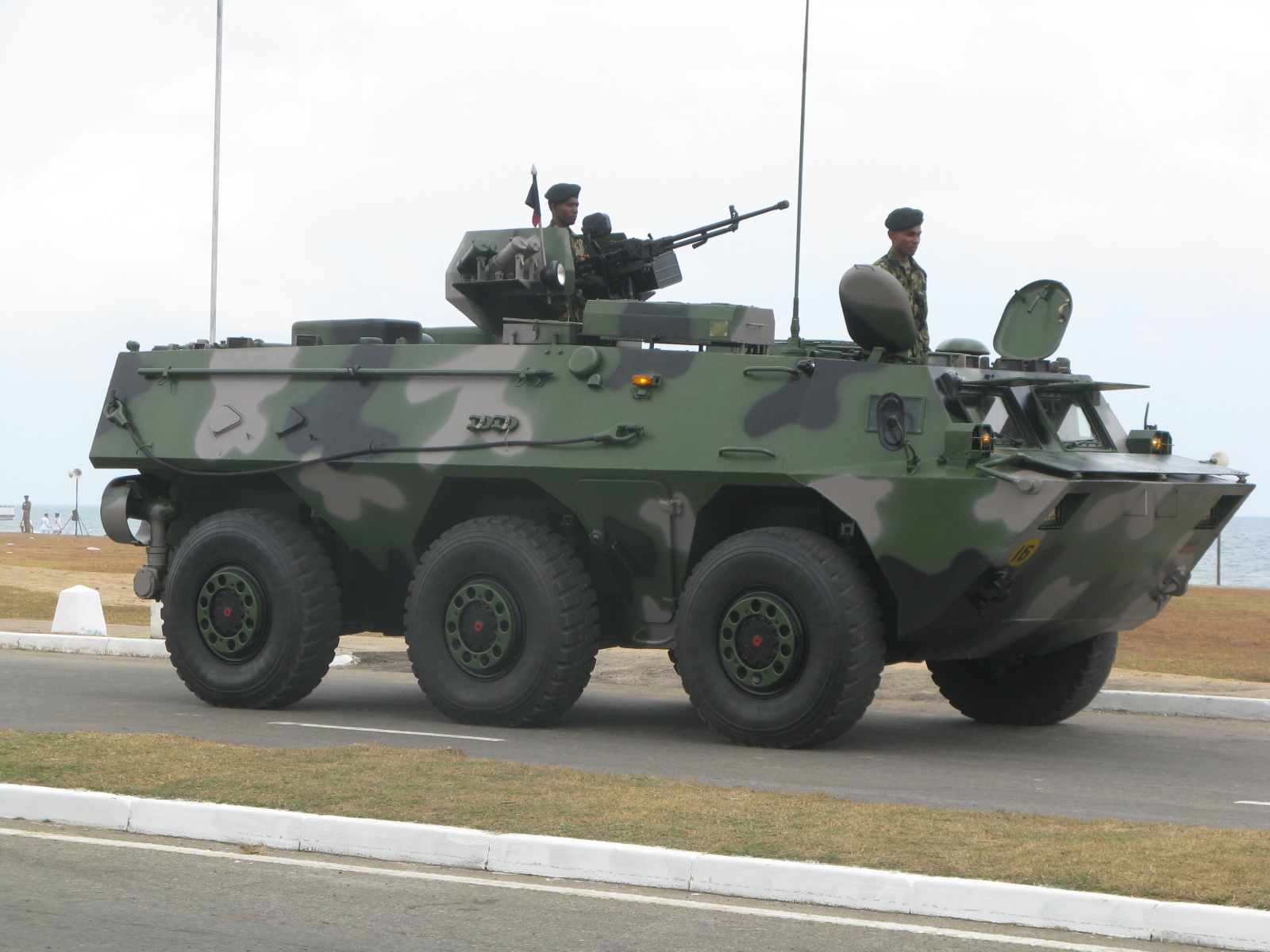
Sri Lanka Army WZ551 APC

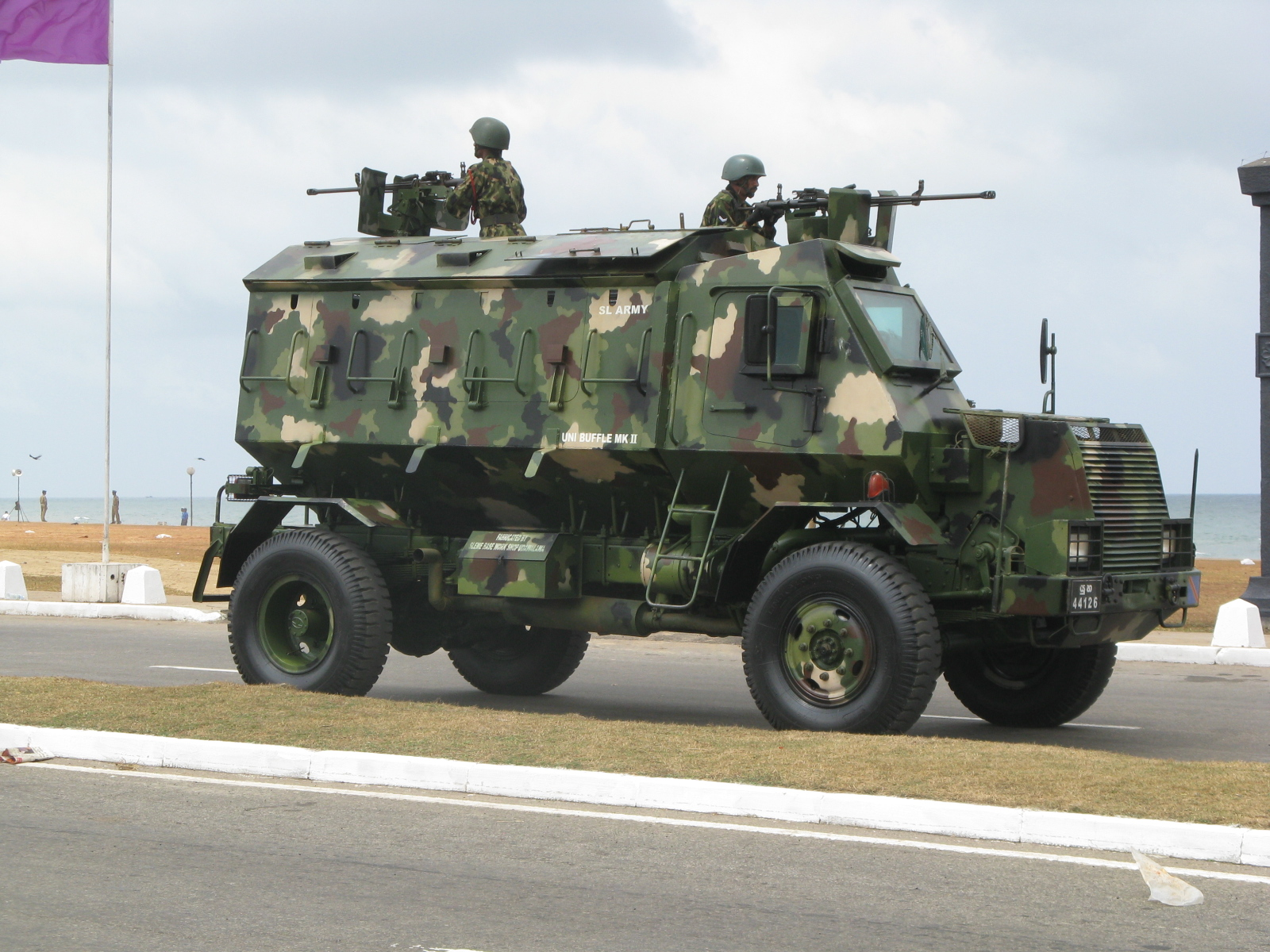
Unibuffel MK II Armoured Personnel Carrier – Sri Lanka Army

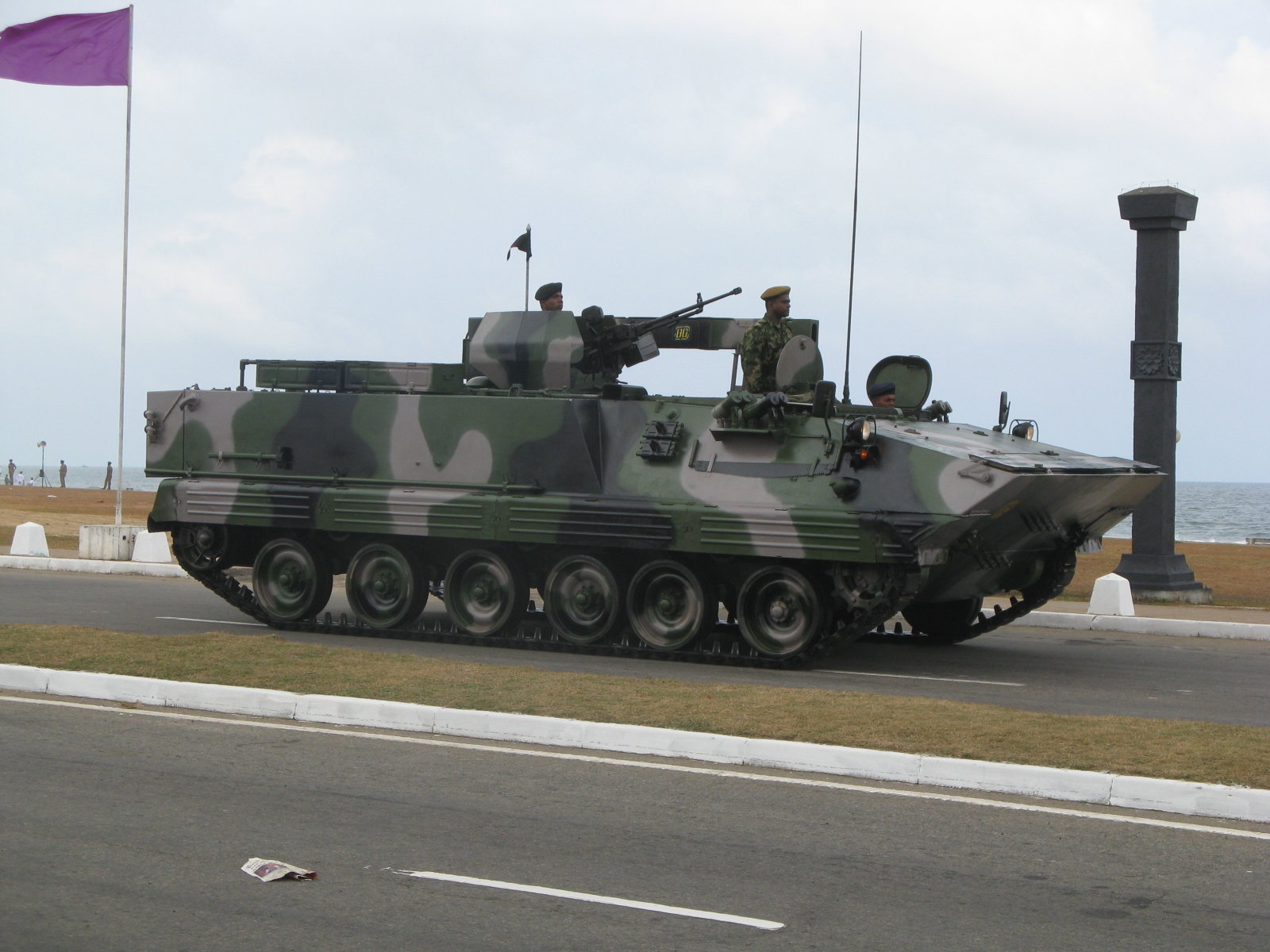
Type 89 (YW534) Armoured Fighting Vehicles

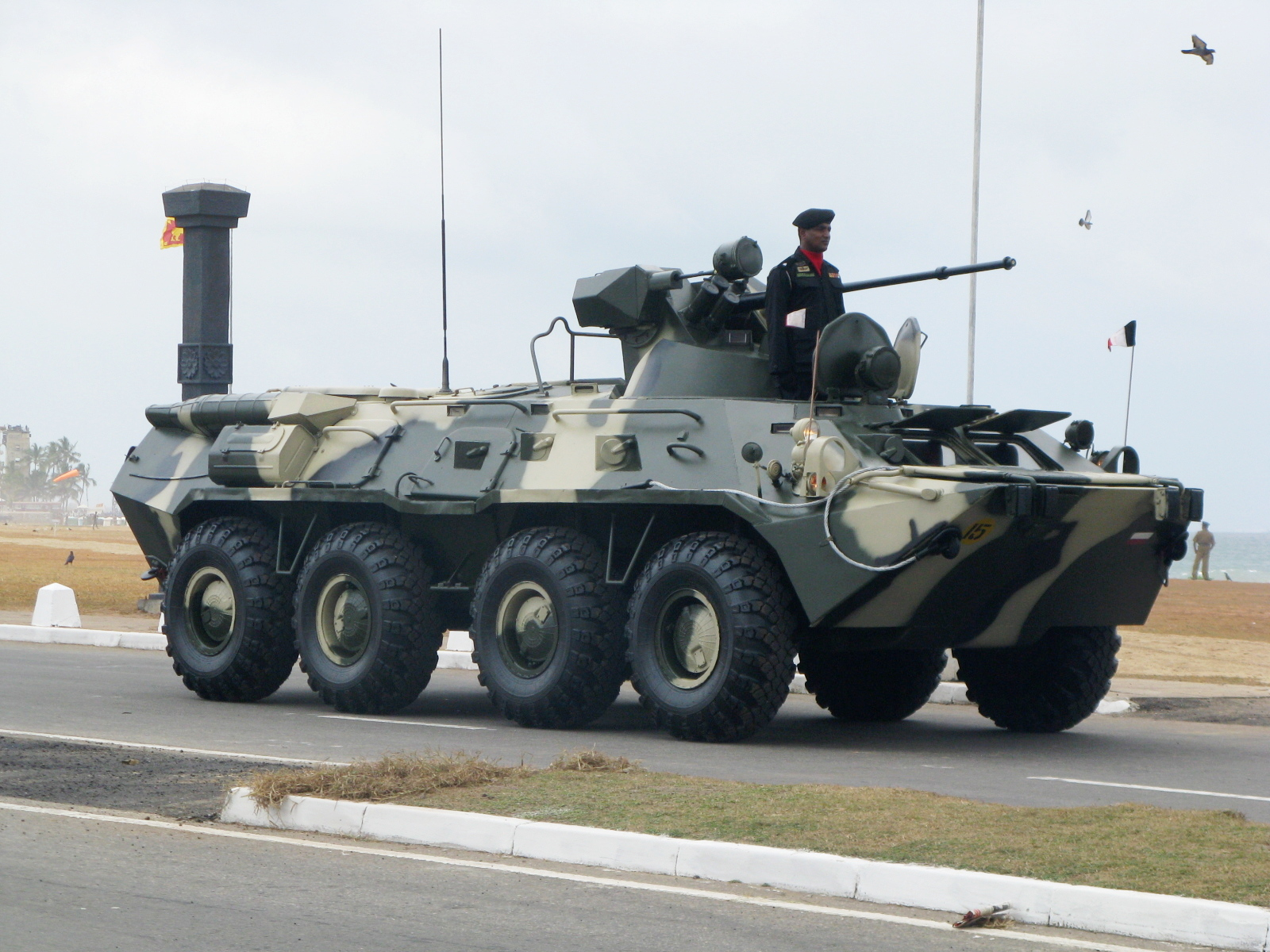
Sri Lanka Army BTR80A

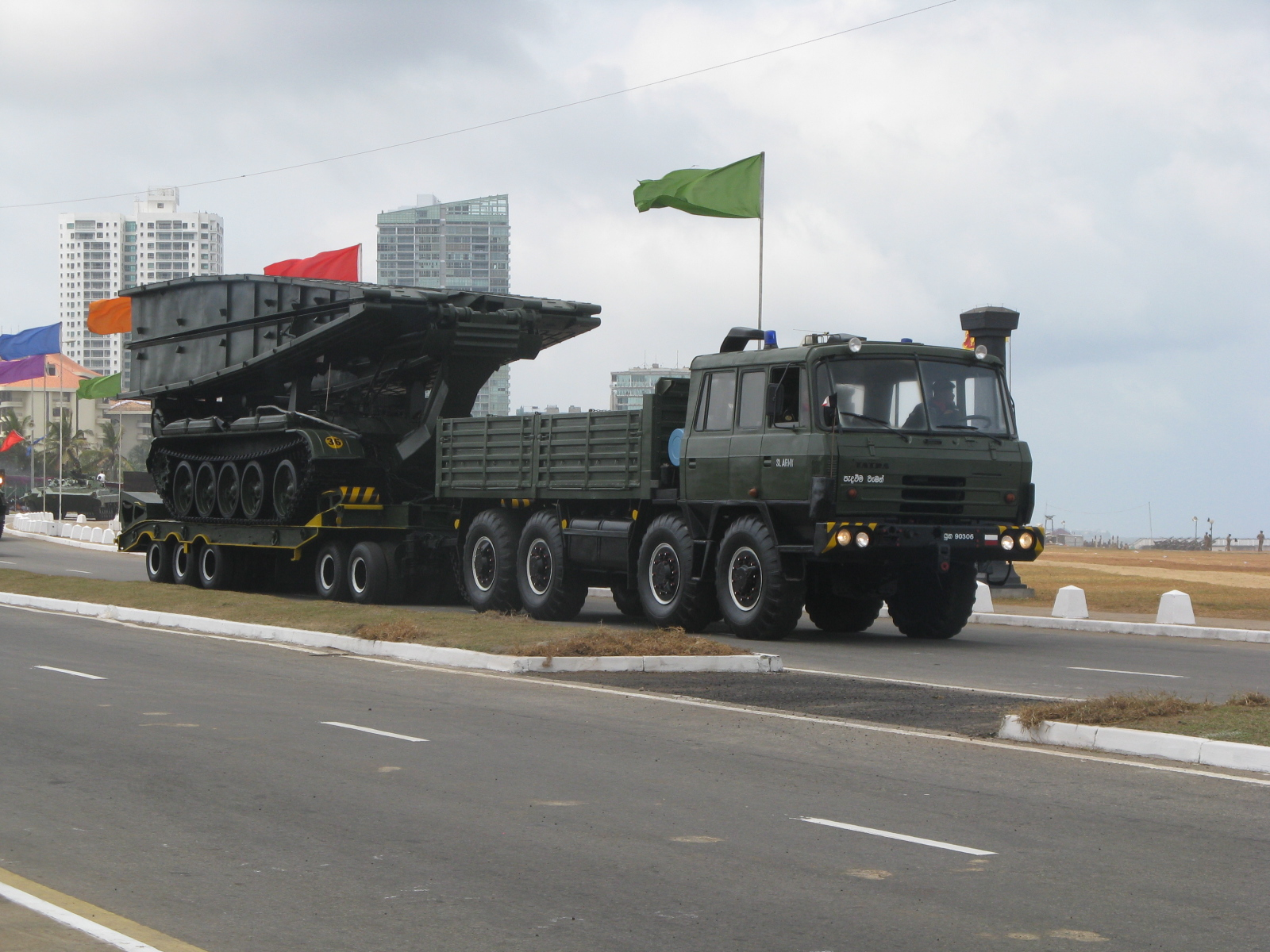
Sri Lanka Army MT-55A Armoured Vehicle-launched Bridge pulled by Tatra T815 Truck

Type	Origin	Quantity	Notes
Main battle tanks
T-55AM2	Soviet Union; Czechoslovakia	Unknown numbers in service	Czech modernized variant based on T-55 of Soviet Union
Type 59	China	Up to 25 - 45 in reserve.	
Types 69	China	Unknown numbers in service	
BMP-2 BMP-3	Soviet Union	Unknown numbers in service	
BMP-1	Soviet Union Soviet Union	Unumbers in serviceservice	bmp 1service with unknown numbers of Chinese type 86s
ZSL-92/Type 92 IFV (WZ-551A)	China	80(exact number of vehicles in service unknown)	Wheeled
Type 85 (YW-309)	China	Up to 20	
Armoured cars
Land Rover Hotspur	United Kingdom	Unknown numbers in service	
UniAIMOV	Sri Lanka	Unknown	4x4 Light armoured High-Mobility/Forward Command vehicle
Armoured personnel carriers
Type 89 (YW-534)	China	40	Tracked, including command post version
ZSL-92A/Type-92 APC (WZ-551B)	China	120exact number of vehicles in service unknown)	
Type 85 (YW-531H)	China	30	Tracked, amphibious
Type 63 (YW-531)	China	Up to 10 Type 63 8n reserve	Tracked
BTR-80/80A	Soviet Union Russia	25(originally up to 50 BTR 80/80As are bought from Russia)	Wheeled
Buffel	South Africa; West Germany	31(originally bought south africa buffeles Mrap numbers unknown )	Mine-protected APC
Unibuffel	South Africa; West Germany Sri Lanka	60+(exact produce vehicle numbers unknown)	Locally manufactured, mine-protected APC
Unicorn	Sri Lanka	105(exact produced vehicle numbers unknown)	Locally manufactured, mine-protected APC
Avalon	Sri Lanka	Unknown numbers in service	6x6 Mine-Resistant Ambush Protected Command vehicle
Unicob	Sri Lanka	Unknown numbers in service	Mine Resistant Ambush Protected Vehicle
Engineering support vehicles
VT-55	Soviet Union Czechoslovakia	16	Armoured recovery vehicle
MT-55A	Soviet Union Czechoslovakia	Up to2 -10	Armoured vehicle-launched bridge
BREM-K	Soviet Union Russia	Unknown numbers in service	Armoured recovery vehicle
Type 89 Recovery Vehicle	China	Unknown numbers in service	Armoured recovery vehicle
XJZ-92 Armored Recovery Vehicle	China	Unknown numbers in service	Armoured recovery vehicle

=== Multi Purpose Trucks ===
Type	Origin	Quantity	Notes
UniCOLT	Sri Lanka	Unknown numbers in service	Multi Purpose Truck
Tata Model 1210 SD	India	Unknown numbers in service	Field Artillery Tractor
Tata Defence Troop Carrier LPT 709	India	Unknown numbers in service	Troop carrier
Ashok Leyland Stallion	India	Unknown numbers in service	Troop carrier
NORTHBENZ Tiema XC2200	China	Unknown numbers in service	Troop carrier, Field Artillery Tractor
Tatra 815	Czechoslovakia / Czech Republic	Unknown numbers in service	Troop Carrier, Heavy Equipment Transporter
Sinotruk HOWO 371	China	Unknown numbers in service	Heavy Equipment Transporter
Tata LPTA 1628 6x6	India	Unknown numbers in service	Used for UN missions.
Mitsubishi Canter	Japan	Unknown numbers in service	Troop carrier
Cxxm 3 Generation Combat Personnel Carrier Troop Truck	China	Unknown numbers in service	Used for UN missions.

=== Utility and staff transport ===
Type	Origin	Quantity	Notes
Land Rover Defender	United Kingdom	Unknown numbers in service	Used for Utility and staff transport
Toyota Land Cruiser	Japan	Unknown numbers in service	Used for Utility and staff transport
Tata Sumo	India	Unknown numbers in service	Used for Utility and staff transport
Mitsubishi L200	Japan	Unknown numbers in service	Used for Utility and staff transport

=== Artillery ===
Type	Image	Origin	Quantity	Notes
MRLS
RM-70		Czech Republic	Unknown numbers in service	20.7 km - 40Km range based on use of MRLS rocket type
Phl 81		China	Unknown numbers in service	Based on rocket type
Towed artillery
D-20		Soviet Union	Unknown numbers in service	17,4 km range
Type-59-1		China	30	27 km range
Type-83		China	Unknown numbers in service	19 km range
Mortars
PM-43 120mm		Soviet Union	Unknown numbers in service	5,7 km range
82mm		unknown	Unknown numbers in service	
81mm		unknown	Unknown numbers in service	

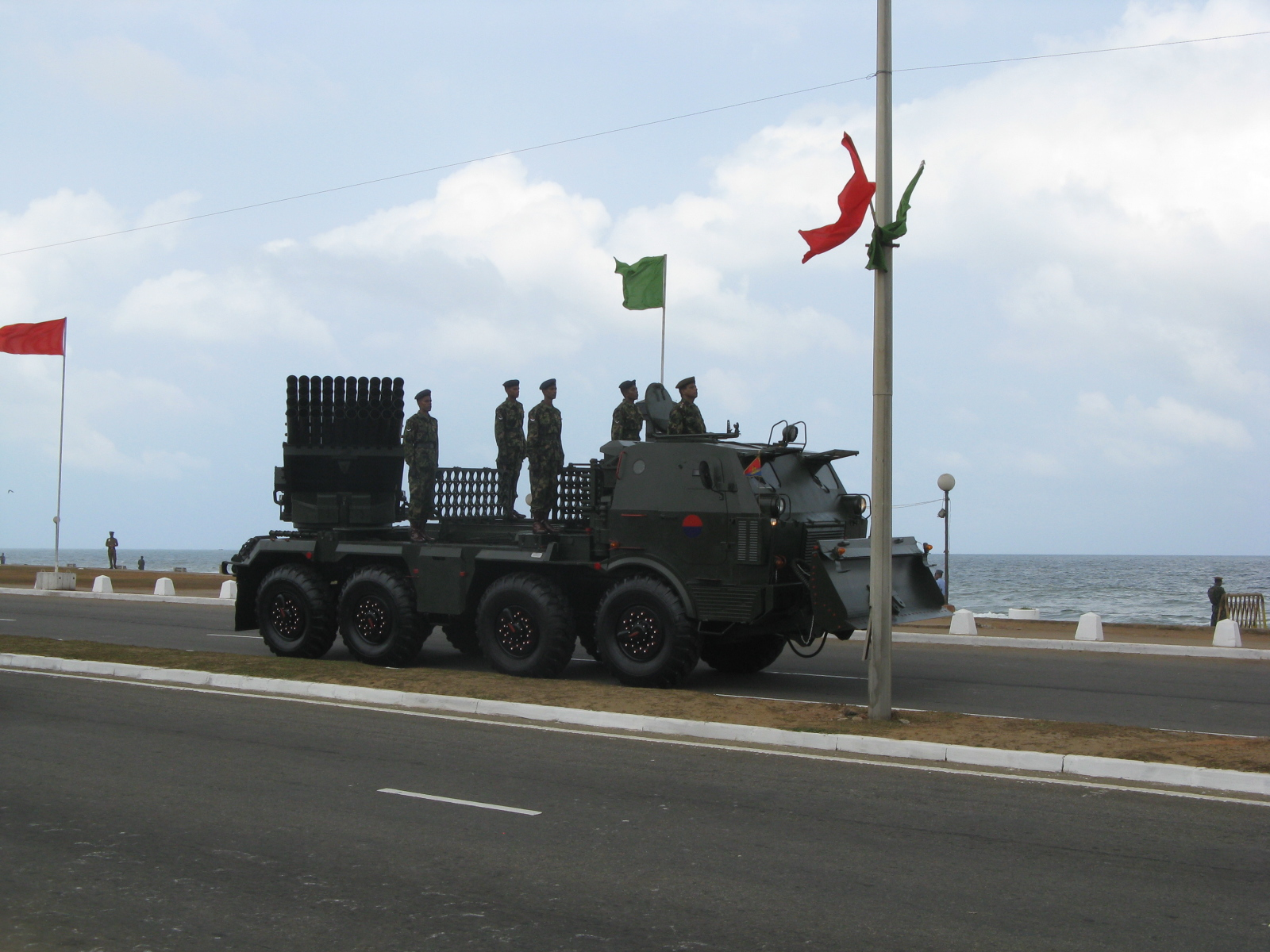
RM-70 Multi Barrel Rocket Launcher – Sri Lanka Army

=== Special vehicles ===
Type	Origin	Quantity	Notes
BJ2022	China	10	Field communication vehicle

=== Infantry Attire & Gears ===
Attire & Equipment
Name	Image	Type	Notes
OR-201		Combat Helmet	Standard issue from 1980s
PASGT		Combat Helmet	Current standard issue
MICH		Combat Helmet	Used by Army Commando Regiment and Special Forces Regiment.
TSh-4M		Crewman Helmet	Issue for Crewman Helmet for Main battle tank and Armored Fighting Vehicle Crewman.
"Blotch" Camouflage Pattern		Combat uniform	Standard issue
M81 Battle Dress Uniform		Combat uniform	Firstly issued for Army Commando Regiment, designated as No. 7 Dress
Black Battle Dress Uniform		Combat uniform	Used by some unit of Special Forces Regiment
Pixelated Camouflage Pattern		Combat uniform	Used by Army Commando Regiment and the Special Forces Regiment
Ghillie Suit		Ghillie suit	Used by Army Commando Regiment and Special Forces Regiment.
Bomb Suit		Bomb suit	Issued for Counter-Terrorist Bomb Disposal Unit

=== Infantry weapons ===
Handguns	Country of manufacture
Beretta 92	Italy
Glock 17	Austria
Glock 19	Austria
Type 54 pistol	China
Makarov pistol	Soviet Union
Taurus PT24/7	Brazil
CZ 75	Czechoslovak Socialist Republic
QSZ-92	China
P226	Switzerland
M1911	US
Assault rifles, Battle rifles and Carbines
Type 56 (ceremonial use only)	China
Type 56-2	China
Type 81 assault rifles	China
M16 (A2 and A4)	US
M4 Carbine	US
SAR-21	Singapore
QBZ-95	China
SAR-80 (Retd)	Singapore
FN FNC (Retd)	Belgium
MZ-47	Israel
CAR-15	US
G3 (Retd)	West Germany
Sub-machine guns
MP5 (MP5A3, MP5SD6, MP5KA5)	West Germany Germany
Uzi submachine guns	Israel
Taurus SMT-9	Brazil
PM-63	Poland
Sniper rifles	Country of manufacture
Accuracy International L96A1	UK
Zastava M93 Black Arrow	Federal Republic of Yugoslavia
SVD	Soviet Union
Heckler & Koch PSG1 sniper rifles	West Germany
Shotguns	Country of manufacture
Baikal MP-153	Russia
Winchester Model 1897	USA
Machine guns
Type 80	China
FN Minimi	Belgium
FN MAG	Belgium
M240 machine gun	US
HK21 Belt-fed light machine gun	West Germany Germany
Grenade launchers
Milkor MGL grenade launcher	South Africa
HK 69 breech-loading grenade launcher	West Germany
M203 grenade launcher	US
AGS-17 Automatic grenade launcher	Soviet Union
STK 40 AGL automatic grenade launcher	Singapore
Rocket launchers
M72 LAW	US
RPO-A Shmel man-portable rocket launcher	Soviet Union Russia
Type 69 RPG rocket launchers	China
IMI Shipon shoulder-launched rocket system	Israel
Anti-tank weapons
HJ-8 Anti-tank guided missile	China
Carl Gustaf 8.4cm recoilless rifle	Sweden

== Welfare ==
=== Sri Lanka Army Seva Vanitha Unit ===
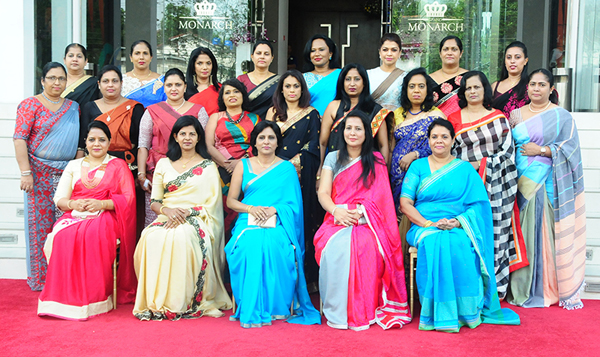
Sri Lanka Army Seva Vanitha Unit President with the presidents of Regimental Branches

Inaugurated on 12 July 1984, Sri Lanka Army Seva Vanitha Unit functions with the main objective of providing welfare facilities to the next of kin of war heroes who have sacrificed their lives, gone missing in action or injured whilst defending the sovereignty and territorial integrity of their motherland while also empowering the families of the serving Army personnel. Traditionally the organisation functions under the leadership of the wife of the serving Commander of the Army, and the members are the spouses of Army Officers as well as Lady Officers. The organisation extends to 22 Regimental branches functioning under the patronage of the wives of the respective Regimental Commanders.

Sri Lanka Army Seva Vanitha Unit conducts various welfare projects such as Viru Kekulu pre-schools, day care centres, welfare shops, bakeries and salons, with the contribution of the membership. Such as Construction of houses, giving away of educational scholarships and assisting in times of natural disasters, are done at both organizational and Regimental levels. The volunteer service extended by the spouses of the Army Officers whilst multitasking at their roles as wives, mothers and professionals, is a strength to Sri Lanka Army.

== Gallery ==
Sri lanka Army

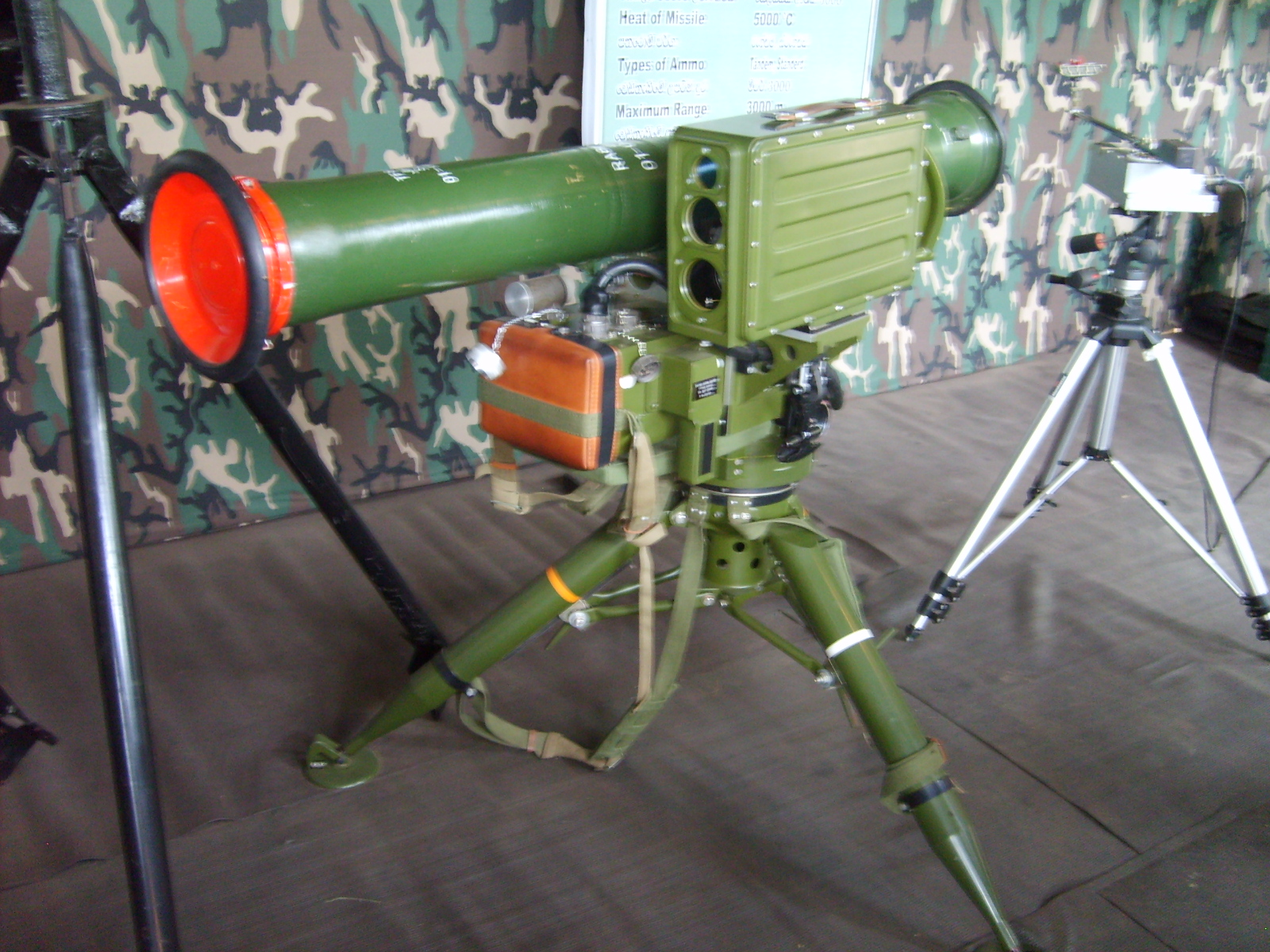
SLA HJ-8.

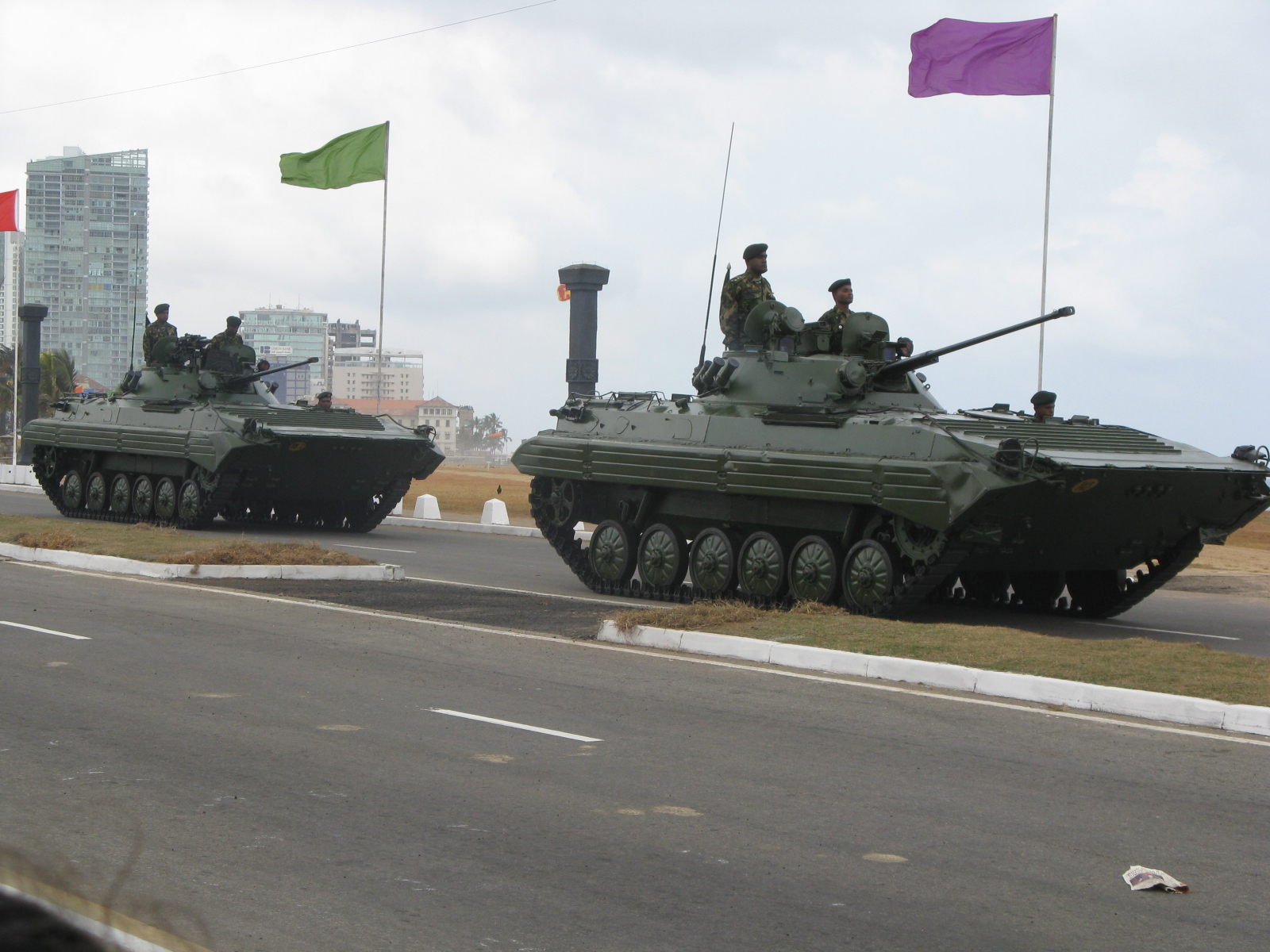
BMP-2 infantry fighting vehicle

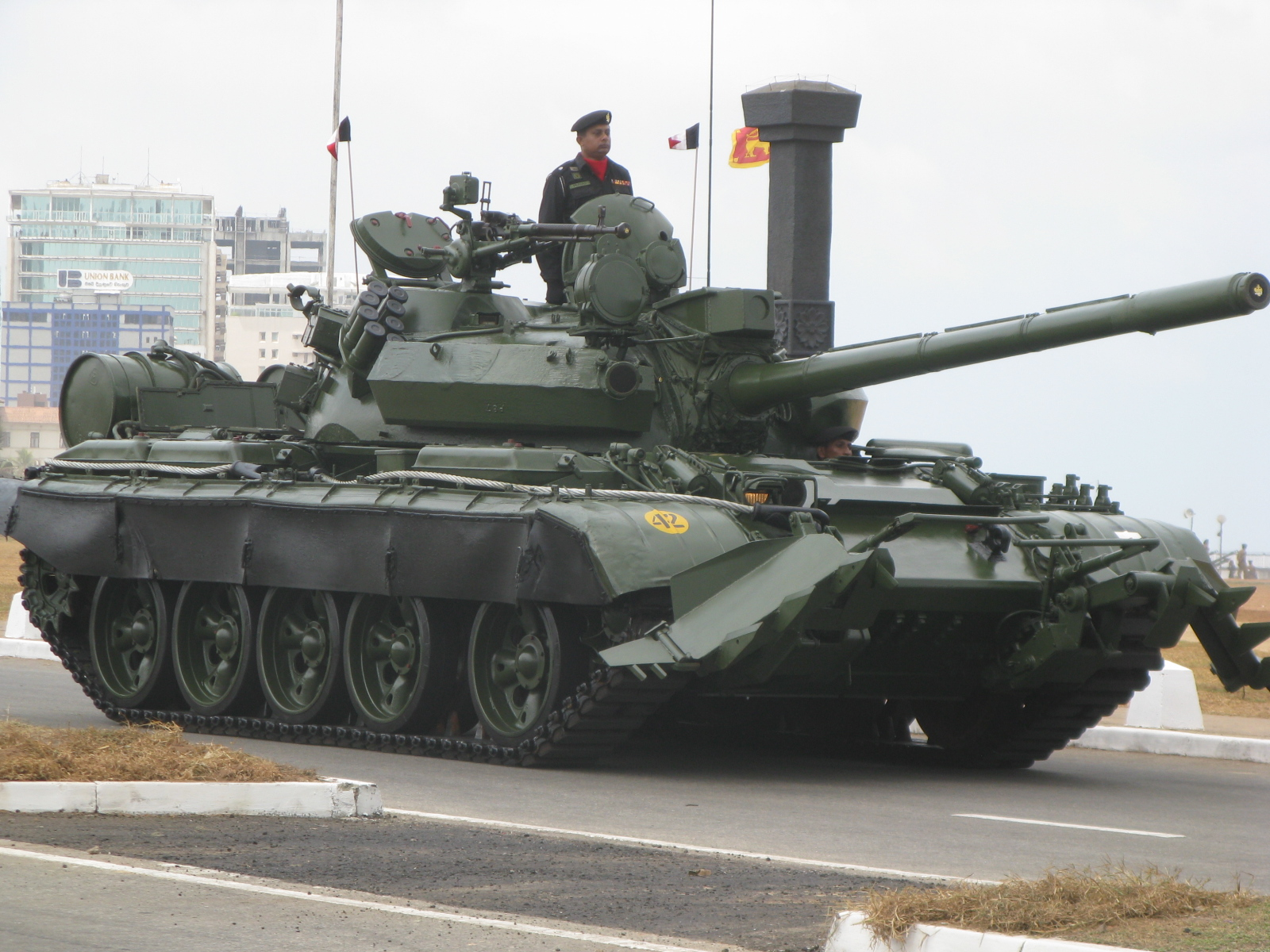
T-55AM2.

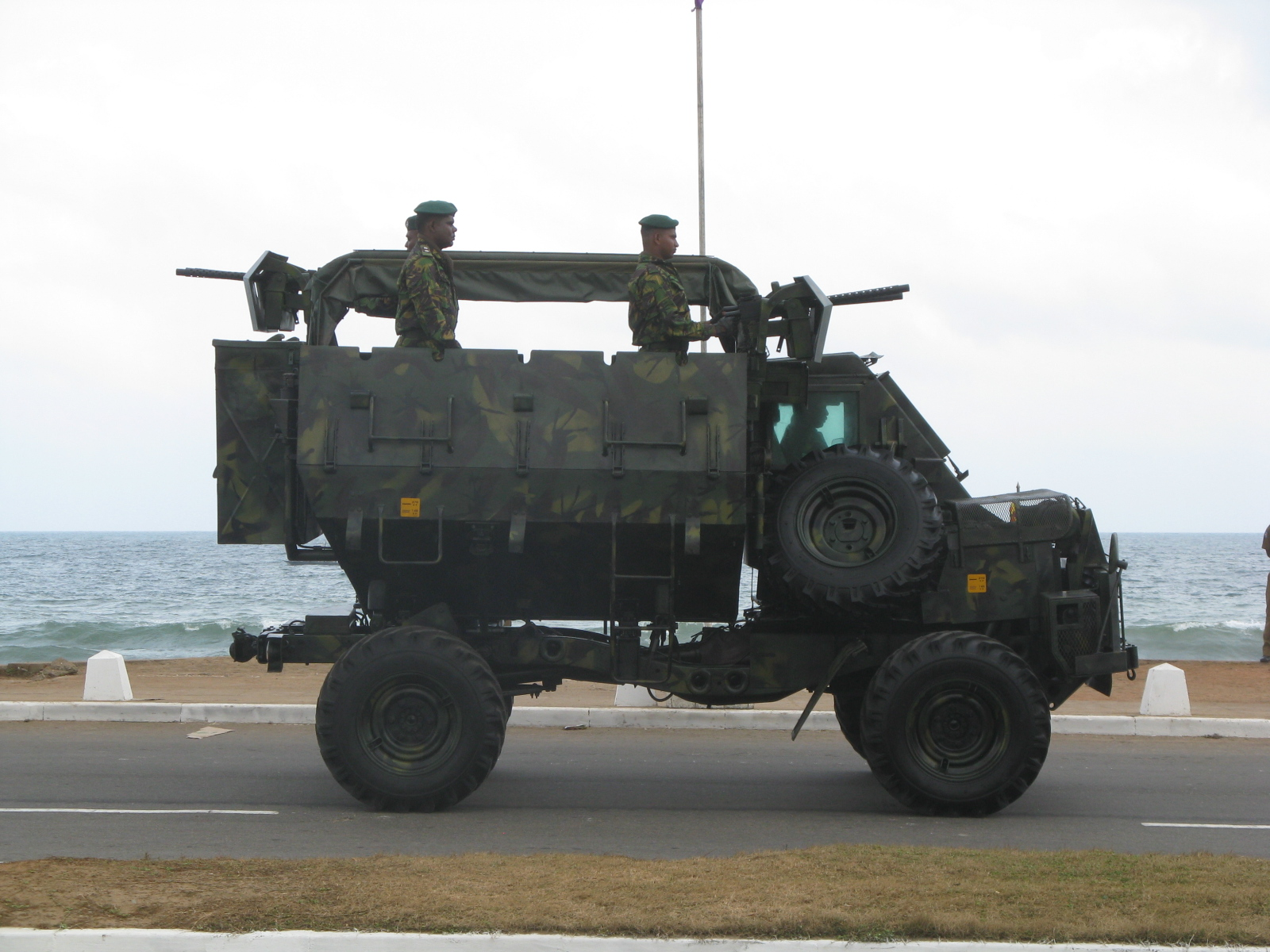
SLA Unibuffel.

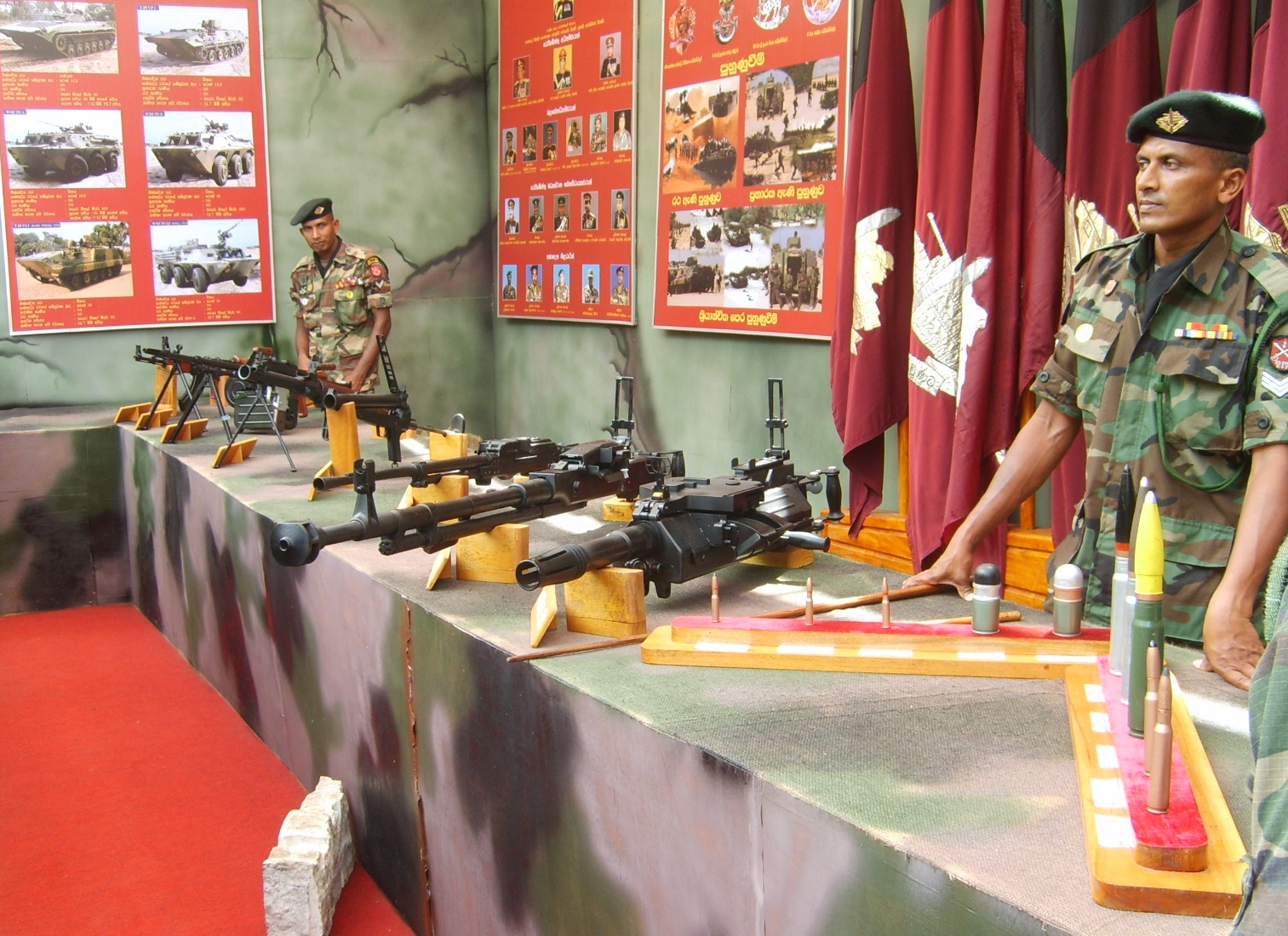
SLA MIR weapons

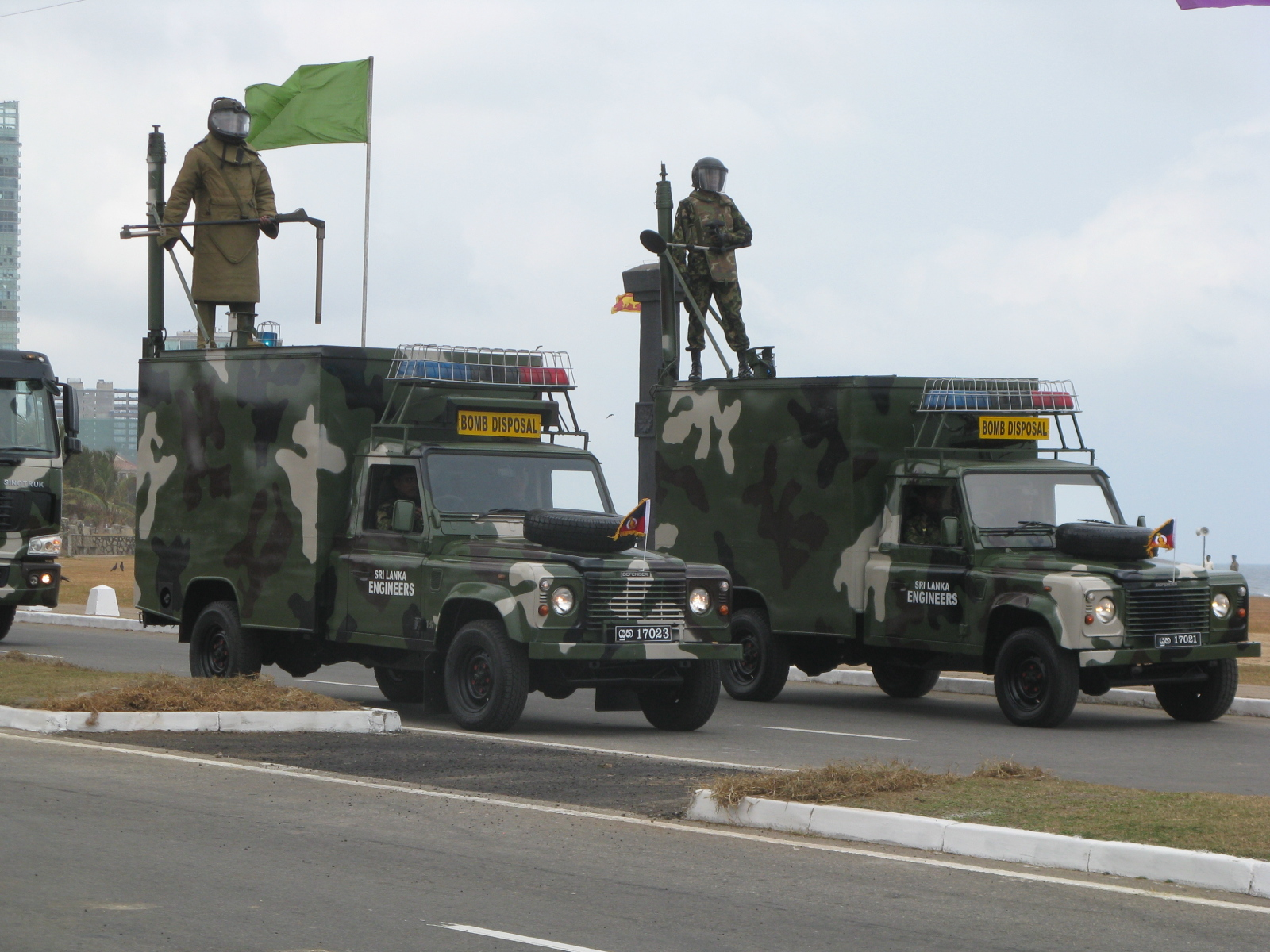
SLA Bomb Disposal Units on Victory Day Parade.

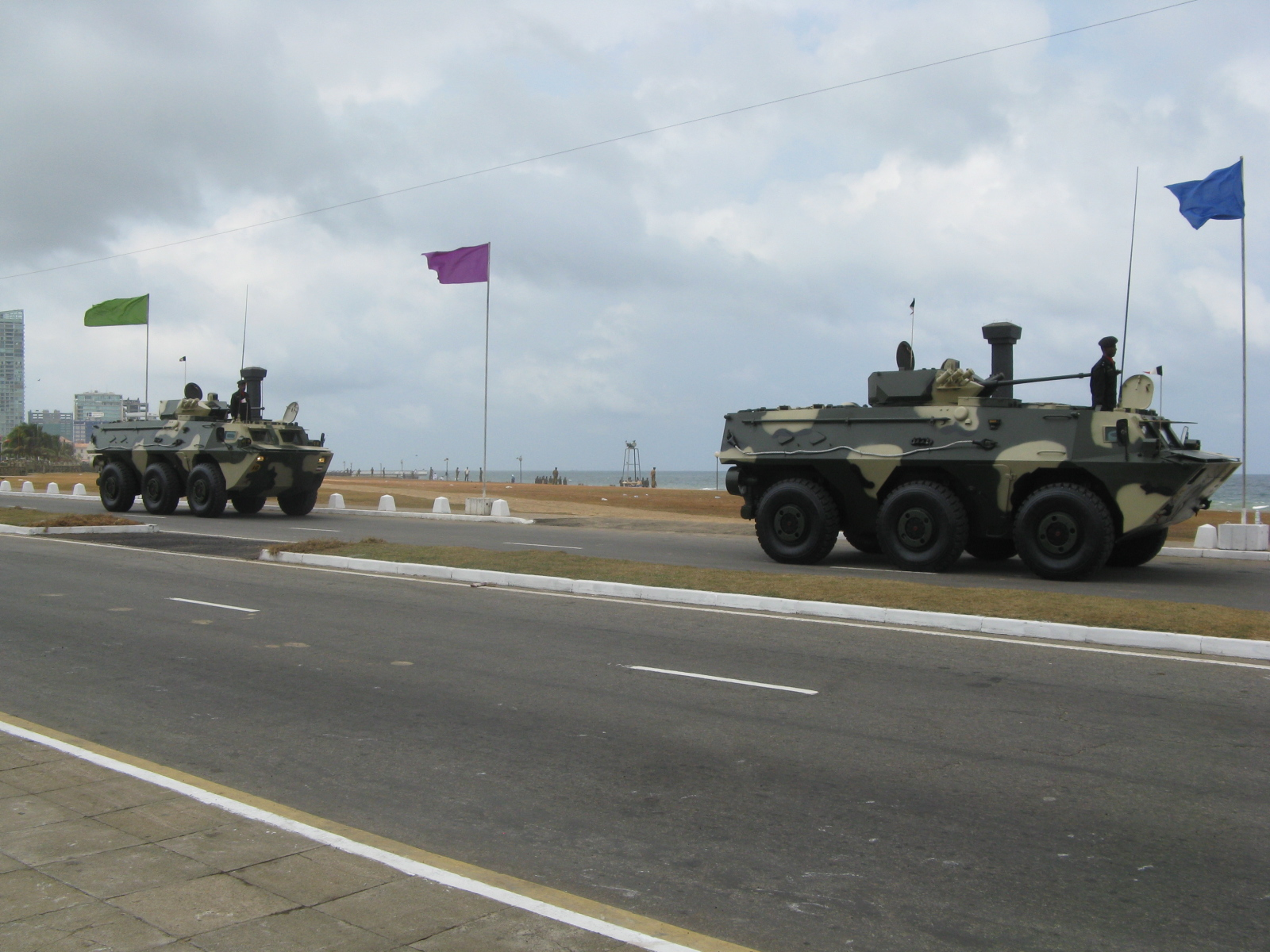
WZ551 (Type 92) infantry fighting vehicles.

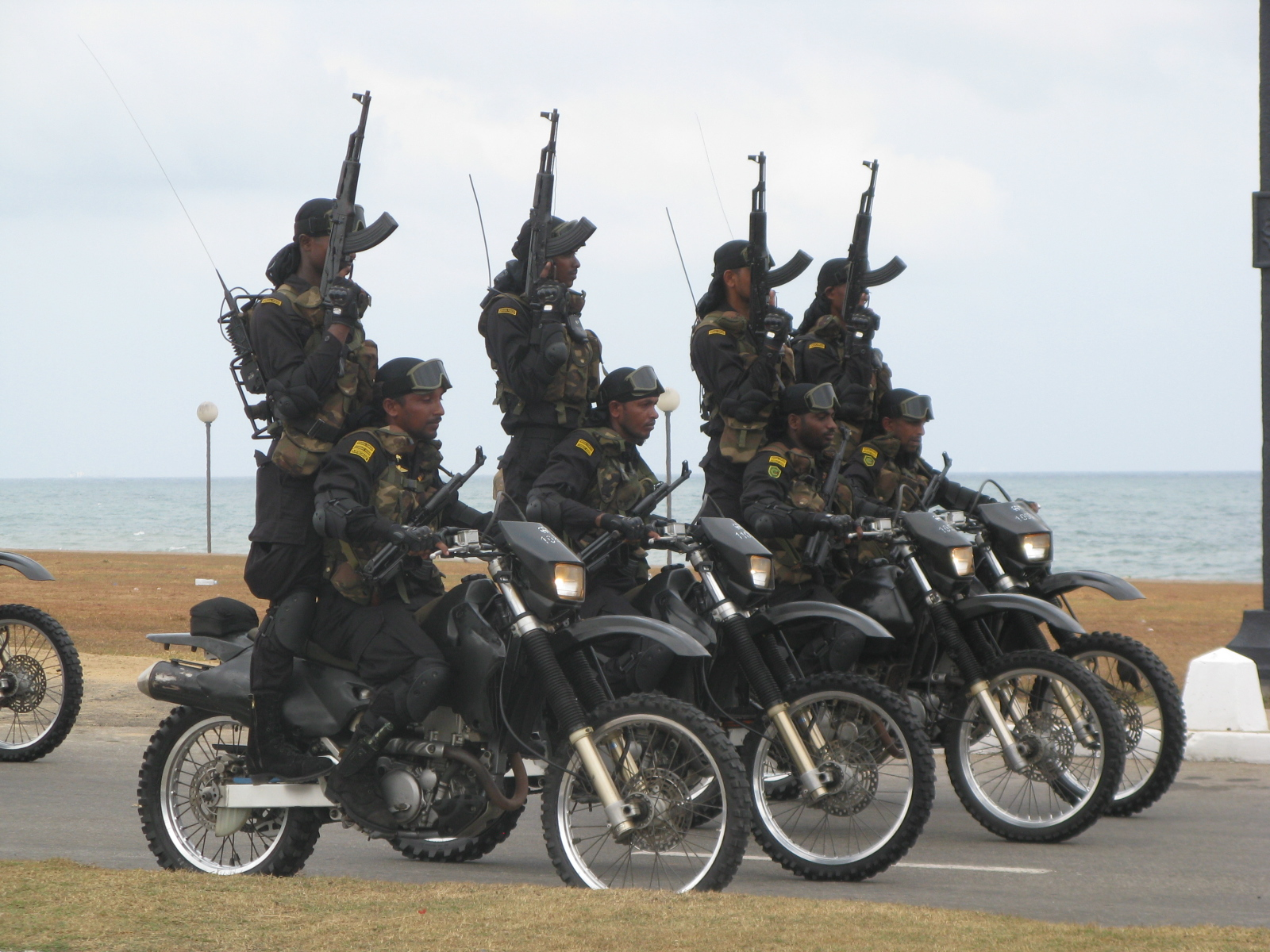
Combat Rider Teams, Special Forces Regiment

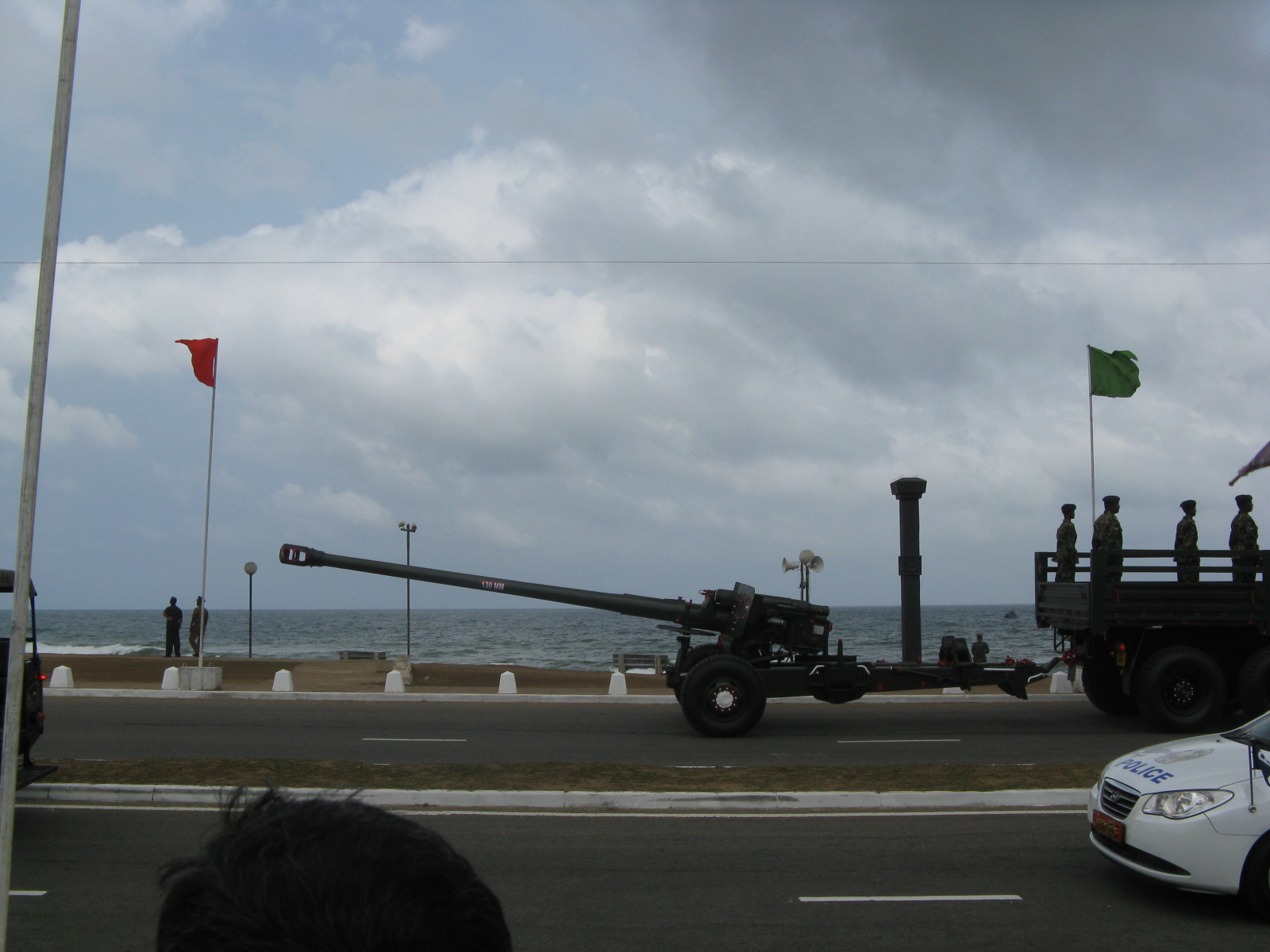
Type 59 130mm field gun

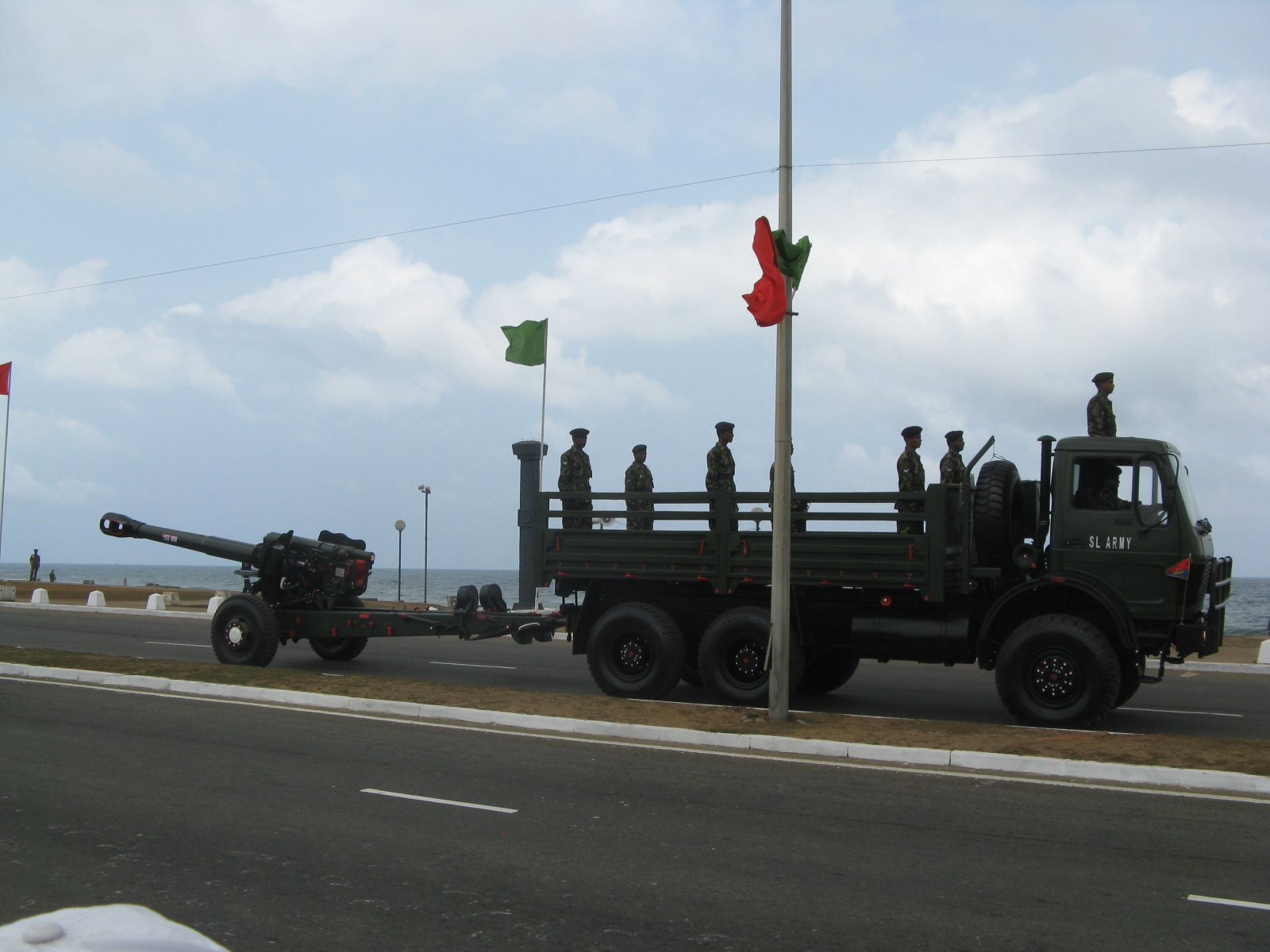
Type 66 152 mm gun-howitzer

== See also ==
- Awards and decorations of the military of Sri Lanka
- Uniforms of the Sri Lanka Army
- Sri Lanka Army ranks and insignia
- Sri Lanka National Guard
