= Parami Kulatunga =

Sri Lankan army general

Lieutenant General Parami Kulatunga † RSP, VSV, USP
- Parami Kulatunga, as a Maj. Gen.
- Born: 9 October 1951; Lewella, Kandy, Sri Lanka
- Died: 26 June 2006 (aged 54); Pannipitiya, Colombo
- Military career
- Allegiance: Sri Lanka
- Branch: Sri Lanka Army
- Service years: 1971–2006
- Rank: Lieutenant general (posthumously awarded)
- Unit: Gemunu Watch
- Commands: Deputy Chief of Staff of the Sri Lanka Army
- Conflicts: Sri Lankan Civil War
- Awards: Rana Sura Padakkama; Vishista Seva Vibhushanaya; Uttama Seva Padakkama; Desha Putra Sammanaya

Lieutenant General Parami Sudammika Bandara Kulatunga, RSP, VSV, USP (Sinhala:පාරමී කුලතුංග) (9 October 1951 in Kandy – 26 June 2006 †) was a Sri Lanka Army general. He was serving as the Deputy Chief of Staff of the Sri Lanka Army and its third highest-ranking officer at the time of his assassination. On the morning of 26 June, he was killed by a Tamil Tiger suicide bomber who drove an explosives-laden motorbike into his staff car as it was driving to a military base at Pannipitiya near Colombo.

== Early life and education ==
He was born in Lewella, Kandy, to Lionel and Leela Kulatunga. He was the youngest of four siblings, Lumbini, Samantha and Indu. Kulatunga was educated at Trinity College, Kandy, where he played rugby and became the Senior Regimental Sergeant Major of the Senior Cadet Platoon.

== Military career ==
=== Early career ===
Having joined the Ceylon Army on July 20, 1971, with intake 5A at the height of the 1971 JVP insurrection, receiving his basic training at the Army Tranining Center in Diyatalawa. Completing his training as the second in the order of merit, he was commissioned as a second lieutenant and posted to the 1st Battalion of the Gemunu Watch on October 14, 1972. He was promoted to lieutenant on July 24, 1974; captain on July 24, 1977, and major on June 1, 1982. This included a stint as the first aide-de-camp to Major General Tissa Weeratunga and active service in the northern province with the Gemunu Watch with the onset of the Sri Lankan Civil War, participating in the Vadamarachchi Operation in 1987.

=== Staff officer ===
On March 24, 1989, he was appointed as staff officer to the intelligence operation headquarters of the Ministry of Defence and was promoted to the rank of lieutenant-colonel October 1, 1989. On January 56, 1990, he was appointed as a general staff officer to the 23rd Brigade, taking part in the Operation Balavegaya in 1991 and was thereafter transferred to the general staff of the 2nd Division headquarters with promotion to the rank of colonel on June 27, 1993. He was thereafter appointed as deputy commandant of the General Sir John Kotelawala Defence Academy at Ratmalana on November 31, 1993, and took over as assistant military secretary at the Ministry of Defence June 10, 1994. Kulatunga had attended the Senior Command Course at the Army War College, Mhow; the Advanced Intelligence Course in Singapore and the Intelligence Staff Officers’ Course at the Military Intelligence Training School in Pune.

=== Higher command ===
On December 12, 1994, he was promoted to brigadier and became the brigade commander of the 22 Brigade in Trincomalee, taking part in the Operation Riviresa. He was then appointed director of training at the army headquarters on December 28, 1996, serving until October 1, 1997, when he was appointed deputy general officer commanding of the 56th and 54th Divisions, taking part in the Operation Jayasikuru. On November 28, 1999, he took over as general officer commanding (GOC), 52 Division in Varani. On May 5, 2000, he was promoted to the rank of major general and appointed as GOC of the 11th Division in the Panagoda Cantonment.

In 2003, he attended the U.S. Army War College as an international fellow in the class of 2003. On September 6, 2003, he was appointed the director general of the General Staff, army headquarters and on August 10, 2004, he was appointed Commander of Security Forces HQ, Wanni. On December 6, 2005, he was appointed the deputy chief of staff of the Sri Lanka army, serving as the third highest-ranking office in the army. He was also serving as Colonel of the Regiment of the Gemunu Watch from July 17, 2003. He had represented Sri Lanka in a number of international symposiums, including the Special Operations conference in the US, South Asia Peace Keeping Operations Seminar in Bangladesh, Pacific Armies Management seminar in Malaysia, Senior Military Officers’ Seminar in United Kingdom and United Nations medal awarding parade in Haiti.

== Assassination ==
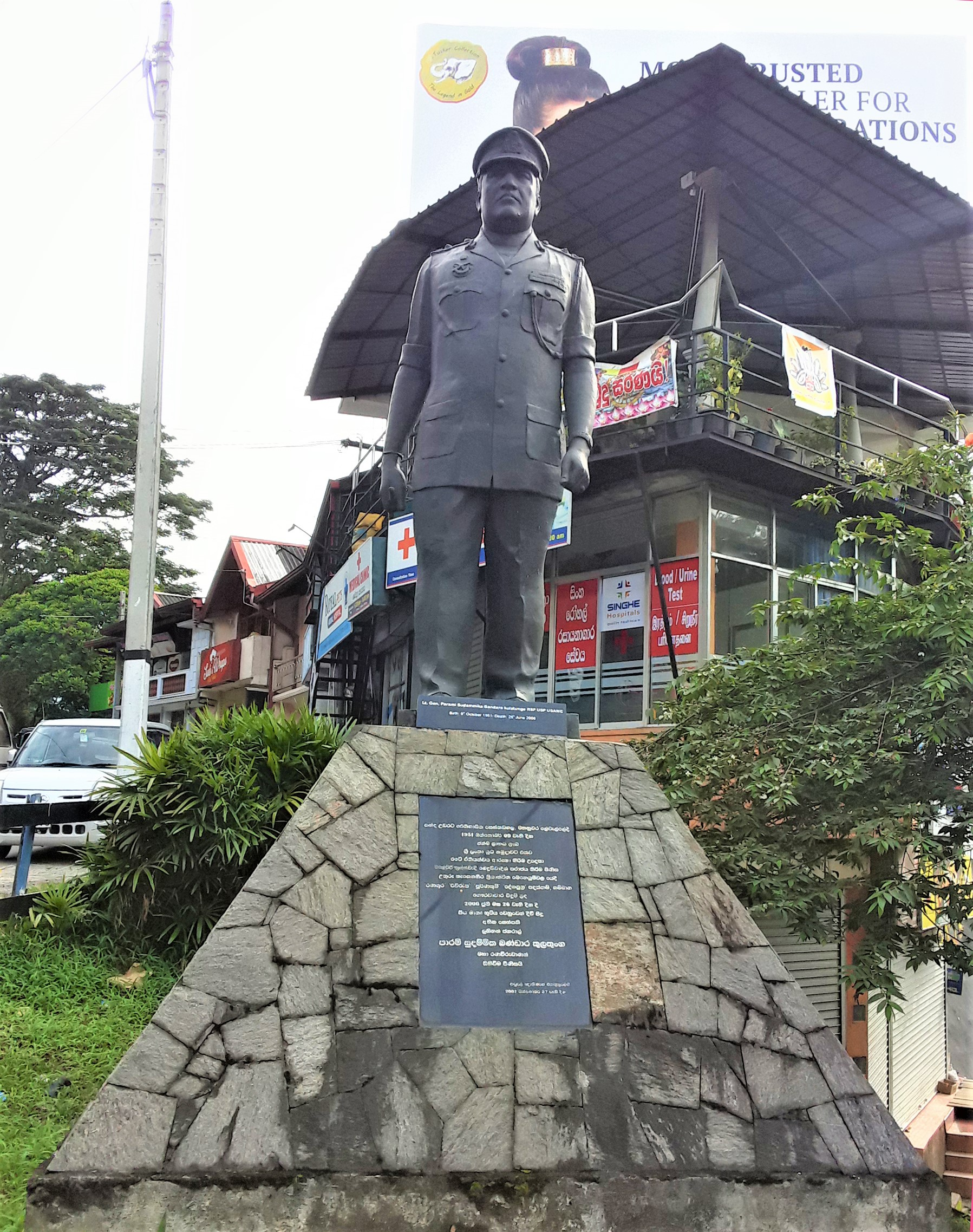
Lt General Parami Kulatunga Statue at Kandy.

On the morning of June 26, 2006, Major General Kulatunga was killed along with two other military personnel of his detail, Staff Sergeant Gomes and Corporal Buddhika and a civilian bystander, by a Tamil Tiger suicide bomber who drove an explosives-laden motorbike into his Peugeot 406 staff car at Pannipitiya as it was driving to army headquarters from his official quarters at the Panagoda Cantonment. He was age 55 at the time of his death. The government did not retaliate in force due to international press.

=== Threats ===
The State Intelligence Service and the Directorate of Military Intelligence had issued warring that despite the ceasefire agreement that was in place at the time, the LTTE was targeting senior military leaders. On 25 April 2006, the Commander of the Army, Lieutenant General Sarath Fonseka was severely wounded by an LTTE suicide bomb attack on his unarmored staff car at the army headquarters. Fonseka was transferred to Singapore for medical treatment. Major General Nanda Mallawaarachchi, Chief of Staff of the Army, took over temporary command of the army and Major General Kulatunga became the second in command effectively. Having received warnings, Kulatunga had requested quarters within the Army Headquarters, however this request was turned down. This forced Kulatunga to commute 28 km daily to his office at Army Headquarters from his quarters in the Panagoda Cantonment in his unarmored staff car.

=== Funeral ===
Major General Kulatunga was posthumously promoted to the rank of lieutenant general effective from June 28, 2006, the day his funeral took place at the Colombo general cemetery with full military honors. A Memorial Dedication service for Lieutenant General Kulatunga was held at the U.S. Army War College in Carlisle, Pennsylvania on October 11, 2006.

=== Investigation ===
Police Criminal Investigation Department investigations into the attacks on Fonseka and Kulatunga, discovered LTTE links with organized crime groups in Colombo and military personnel who had collaborated with the LTTE for money. Major Manamendra Dassanayake was convicted of aiding and abetting the LTTE in the assassinations of Lieutenant General Parami Kulathunga and Colonel Tuan Nizam Muthaliff, while Major Piyasiri Perera who was sentenced to death by a Court Marshall for treason was also implicated in the assassination.

== Awards and decorations ==
Kulatunga had received Rana Sura Padakkama (RSP) for gallantry, Uttama Seva Padakkama (USP), Sri Lanka Armed Services Long Service Medal, Riviresa Campaign Services Medal, Purna Bhumi Padakkama, North and East Operations Medal, Desha Putra Sammanaya amongst others. In 2008 he was posthumously awarded the Vishista Seva Vibhushanaya.

Rana Sura Padakkama	Vishista Seva Vibhushanaya	Uttama Seva Padakkama	Desha Putra Sammanaya
Purna Bhumi Padakkama	North and East Operations Medal	Vadamarachchi Operation Medal	Riviresa Campaign Services Medal
Republic of Sri Lanka Armed Services Medal	50th Independence Anniversary Commemoration Medal		Sri Lanka Army 50th Anniversary Medal
Sri Lanka Armed Services Long Service Medal		President's Inauguration Medal	

== See also ==
- List of Sri Lankan generals
