= Amal Karunasekara =

Sri Lanka army general

Major General Amal Karunasekara
- Military career
- Allegiance: Sri Lanka
- Branch: Sri Lanka Army
- Service years: 1981 – 2018
- Rank: Major General
- Unit: Sri Lanka Light Infantry
- Commands: Chief of Staff; Kilinochchi Security Forces; 53 Division; Sri Lankan Contingent, United Nations Stabilisation Mission in Haiti
- Conflicts: Sri Lankan Civil War; Insurrection 1987-89
- Awards: Rana Wickrama Padakkama; Rana Sura Padakkama; Vishista Seva Vibhushanaya; Uttama Seva Padakkama

Major General K.A.D. Amal Karunasekara, RWP, RSP, VSV, USP, ndu, psc is a retired senior Sri Lankan army officer who served as 51st Chief of Staff of the Sri Lanka Army. Major General (Rtd) Karunasekara is also the first Commandant of the National Defence College, Sri Lanka.

== Education ==
Educated at Nalanda College Colombo, Karunasekara was a Senior Cadet in the school's cadet platoon. Having received his basic training at the Sri Lanka Military Academy, he is a graduate of the Defence Services Command and Staff College, the Defence Services Staff College and the PLA National Defence University having studied Defence and Stretegic Studies. He also holds a MSc in Defence and Strategic Studies from the University of Madras; and a MSc in Defense Management from General Sir John Kotelawala Defence University.

== Military career ==
Karunasekara enlisted in the Sri Lanka Army as an Officer Cadet in 1981, going on to earn his commission as a Second Lieutenant in the Sri Lanka Light Infantry after completing training at the Sri Lanka Military Academy, Diyatalawa in 1984. Over the next 35 years, he would rise through the ranks of the army, holding such key positions as Director Military Intelligence, Director Infantry, Master General of Ordnance Branch, and Military Secretary. Karunasekara has held both battalion- and brigade-level commands during the Eelam War, and has commanded the 53 Division during its course. In addition, he was appointed the commander of the Sri Lankan contingent of the UN peacekeeping mission in Haiti (MINUSTAH) when first deployed in 2004.

He was the 15th Colonel of the Regiment of the Sri Lanka Light Infantry regiment, having occupied this position once temporarily between 2007 and 2009. He was an instructor at Diyatalawa and Directing Staff at the Defence Services Command and Staff College.

Karunasekara was appointed Commander of Security Forces Headquarters- Kilinochchi on 18 October 2015; he was promoted to Chief of Staff of the Army on 22 July 2017, after the promotion of Mahesh Senanayake to Army Commander earlier the same month left the position vacant. He retired from service on 14 March 2018 with the rank of Major General.

== Controversy ==
As commandant of the Sri Lankan contingent of MINUSTAH since 2004, Karunasekara has been at the center of the child sexual abuse scandal that troops and officers under his command have been implicated in

On 5 April 2018, he was arrested by the Sri Lanka Police Criminal Investigation Department on charges of aiding and abetting the abduction and assault on The Nation journalist Keith Noyahr in 2008. Karunasekara was accused of being part of a group of military intelligence operatives that functioned under the direction of the Mahinda Rajapakse government between 2006 and 2010. He is currently under investigation for several related acts of state-sanctioned violence, including the assassination of Lasantha Wickrematunge.

== Personal life ==
Karunasekara is married, and has one daughter with his wife Dananjanie.

Having been an avid hockey player at school level, he has represented Sri Lanka at national level in the sport and has gone on to be chairman of the Sri Lanka Army Hockey Committee

Military offices
Preceded by Mahesh Senanayake	Chief of Staff of the Army (Sri Lanka); July 2017 - March 2018	Succeeded by Dampath Fernando
