= Diyatalawa Garrison =

- Diyatalawa, Uva Province

Site information
- Type: Military Base
- Controlled by: Area Headquarters Diyatalawa

Site history
- In use: 1885 – present

Garrison information
- Garrison: Gemunu Watch

The Diyatalawa Garrison is a common name used for collection of military bases of the Sri Lanka Army located in and around the garrison town Diyatalawa in the Uva Province. Sometimes it is referred to as the Diyatalawa Cantonment. It is one of the oldest military garrisons in Sri Lanka. It is home to the several training centers of the army, including the Sri Lanka Military Academy and has a detachment of the Gemunu Watch. The Sri Lanka Army Medical Corps maintains a base hospital in Diyatalawa. SLAF Diyatalawa is situated in close proximity.

== History ==
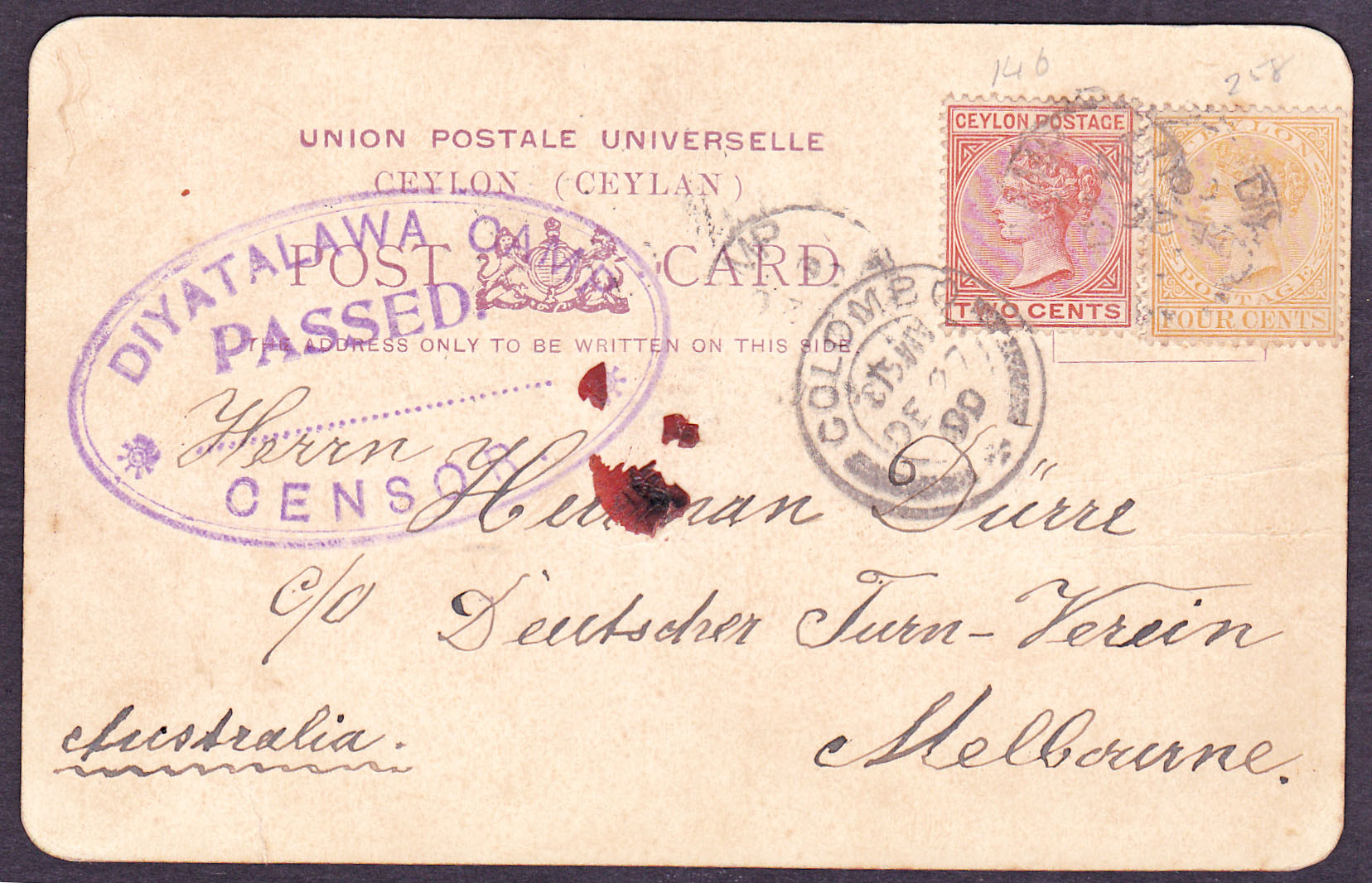
Postcard from the Boer War Prisoner-of-war Camp at Diyatalawa in 1900

It is not exactly known as to when Diyatalawa became a training station for troops, but available records show that it was selected around 1885, when the British Army first established a garrison at Diyatalawa. At that time training was conducted at the Imperial Camp which is presently occupied by the Gemunu Watch troops. In 1900, the British War Office constructed a concentration camp in Diyatalawa to house Boer prisoners captured in the Second Boer War. Initially constructed to house 2500 prisoners and 1000 guards and staff, the number of prisoners increased to 5000. During World War I an internment camp for enemy aliens was set up.

Early in World War II the camp was reopened and German nationals resident in Hong Kong and Singapore, as well as many sailors, like those removed from the Asama Maru in violation of international law, were housed here. Also imprisoned were Buddhist monks of German extraction like Nyanaponika and Govinda Anagarika who had acquired British citizenship. In June 1941 most of the sailors were transferred to Canada. The section for Germans was sensibly divided in a pro- and anti-Nazi wing. There was also a section set up to house Italian POWs. After the Japanese started bombing the island, inmates were on 23 February 1942 transferred to camps on the mainland. Males usually went to Dehradun.

After independence the facilities of the British Army were taken over by the newly established Ceylon Army, and Diyatalawa became the primary training grounds for the young army with the establishment in 1950 the Army Recruit Training Depot later renamed at the Army Training Centre. Several of the army's regiments were resided here, 1st Field Squadron, Ceylon Engineers (1951), Sri Lanka Sinha Regiment (1956), Gemunu Watch (1962).

The Royal Navy had a rest camp, HMS Uva, which was situated at Diyatalawa with recreational facilities; this was later taken over by the Royal Ceylon Navy in 1956, commissioning it as HMCYS Rangalla and established its training center there. They had to move out in 1962 and it was taken over by the Gemunu Watch.

On 14 March 2013, the Security Forces Headquarters – Central the youngest of the seven commands of the Sri Lanka Army was formed at Diyatalawa. Prior to this Diyatalawa served as an Area Headquarters.

Army Training Command (ARTRAC) was inaugurated on 29 January 2012 at Diyatalawa. ARTRAC was established as a separate organization for doctrinal development and training monitoring of Sri Lanka Army.

== Training centers ==
- Sri Lanka Military Academy
- Volunteer Force Training School
- Marksmanship and Sniper Training School

== See also ==
- Gemunu Watch
- Trincomalee Garrison
