= Prasanna Chandrasekera =

Sri Lankan army general (born 1965)

Major General Prasanna Chandrasekera
- ප්‍රසන්න චන්ද්‍රසේකර
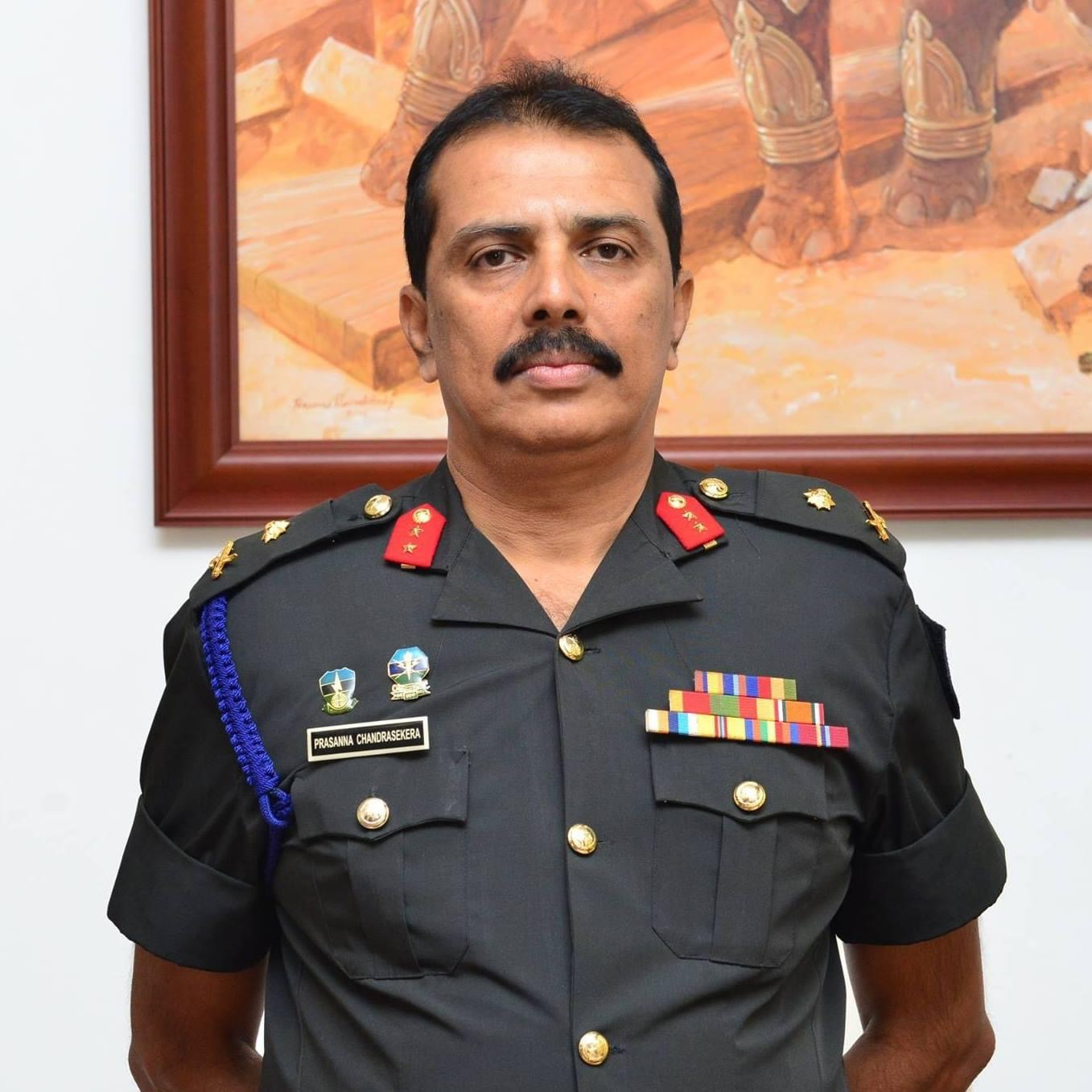
- Born: 10 September 1965 (age 61); Kandy, Sri Lanka
- Spouse: Praveena Bandara
- Children: Daughter and Son
- Military career
- Allegiance: Sri Lankan
- Branch: Sri Lanka Army
- Service years: 1985–2020
- Rank: Major General
- Unit: Sri Lanka Signals Corps
- Commands: Master-General of the Ordnance Quartermaster general Director General Real Estate and Quartering Colonel of the Regiment SLAWC Brigade Commander, 65 Division
- Conflicts: Sri Lankan Civil War; Insurrection 1987-89
- Awards: Sewa Padakkama; Sewabhimani Padakkama; Purna Bhumi Padakkama; Eastern Humanitarian Operations Medal; Northern Humanitarian Operations Medal; North and East Operations Medal; Vadamarachchi Operation Medal; Riviresa Campaign Services Medal; Sri Lanka Army 50th Anniversary Medal; Ceylon Armed Services Long Service Medal
- Other work: Private Secretary to Hon. Seetha Arambepola

Major general Prasanna Chandrasekera, (Sinhala: ප්‍රසන්න චන්ද්‍රසේකර) is a retired Sri Lankan Army general. He was the Master-General of the Ordnance of the Sri Lanka Army, During the Sri Lankan civil war he was the Brigade Commander, 65 Division of the Kilinochchi District.

== Early life and education ==
C. M. D. P. Chandrasekera (Prasanna) was born on 10 September 1965 in Kadugannawa (Central Province, Sri Lanka). He studied at Dharmaraja College, Kandy from the year 1970 to 1984 where he took part in both academics and sports.

== Military career ==
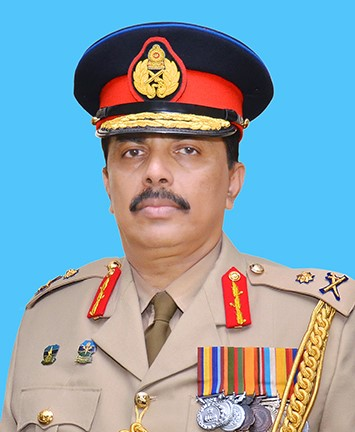
In military coat

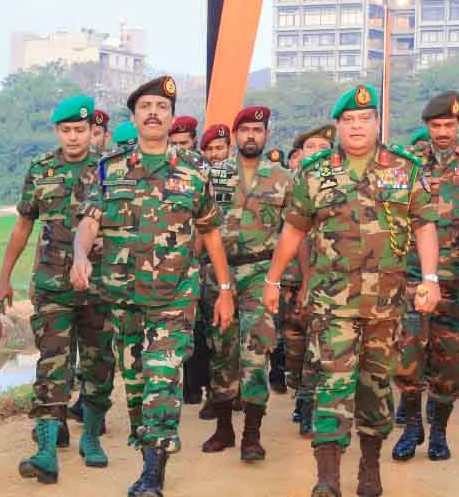
Major General Prasanna Chandrasekera leading the senior army staff with General Shavendra Silva

He enlisted into the Sri Lanka Army Regular Force on 1 November 1985 at Sri Lanka Military Academy, Diyathalawa and Officers' Training School in Pakistan. Later, he was commissioned as a Second Lieutenant and posted to Sri Lanka Signals Corps on 24 July 1986.

Later as a senior army officer, he was the Director General, Real Estate and Quartering of the Sri Lanka Army from 2017 to 2019 and was responsible for acquisition and renting of lands and buildings to the Sri Lanka Army forces. Finally he served as the Master-General of the Ordnance in his office at the Army Headquarters from December 2019 to September 2020. In addition, he was the Colonel of the Regiment of Sri Lanka Army Women's Corps from February 2020 to September 2020 and Chairman of the Army Aquatic and Water Polo Committee.

=== Appointments held at the military level ===
Major General

- Master General Ordnance - 9 December 2019 to 9 September 2020.
- Quarter Master General- 12 November 2019 to 8 December 2019.
- Director General Real Estate and Quartering- 7 January 2019 to 12 November 2019.
- Colonel of the Regiment, Sri Lanka Army Women Corps - February 2020 to September 2020.
- Chairman of the Army Swimming and Water Polo Committee - 9 December 2019 to September 2020.
- Commanding Officer, Station Officers' Mess - Army Headquarters - 9 December 2019 to September 2020.

Brigadier

- Director Real Estate and Quartering- Army Headquarters - September 2017 to January 2019.
- Public Relations Officer - to the Secretary of the Ministry of Defense - March 2015 to September 2016.
- Director of Veteran Affairs -Army Headquarters - February 2015 to March 2015.
- Brigadier General Staff - Security Force Headquarters (Kilinochchi) - March 2014 to February 2015.
- Brigade Commander - 651 Infantry Brigade (Kilinochchi) - March 2013 to March 2014.

Colonel

- Brigade Commander- 651 Brigade- July 2011 to February 2013.
- Colonel Coordinator- Headquarters, Chief Signal Officer- December 2010 to July 2011.
- Colonel General Staff- 23 Infantry Division, Walikanda - April 2009 to December 2010.

Lieutenant Colonel

- Communication Advisor (Technical) - Ministry of Defense, Colombo - May 2007 to April 2009.
- Staff Officer I - Signal Brigade, Panagoda - January 2006 to March 2007.

Major

- Commanding Officer - 3rd Regiment Sri Lanka Signal Corps, Anuradhapura - September 2003 to January 2006.
- Second in Command - 3n1 Regiment Sri Lanka Signal Corps, Anuradhapura - April 2000 to July 2002.
- Commandant - School of Signals, Kandy- July 2002 to June 2003.
- General Staff Officer II (Operation & Training) - 54 Division, Elephant Pass - May 1995 to April 1998.
- General Staff Officer II (Administration) - 21 Division, Anuradhapura - February 1995 to April 1995.

Captain Lieutenant Second Lieutenant

- Adjutant - 3rc1 Regiment Sri Lanka Signal Corps, Anuradhapura - December 1993 to February 1995.
- General staff Officer Ill (Operation) - Army Headquarters, Colombo - June 1991 to December 1993.
- Officer Commanding - Army Electronic Warfare Squadron - April 1991 to June 1991.
- Signal Officer - Security Force Headquarters, Vavuniya - May 1990 to April 1991.
- Signal Officer - 21 Brigade, Vavuniya -August 1989 to May 1990.
- Signal Officer - Security Force Headquarters, West - May 1988 - November 1988.

=== Other military achievements ===
Chandrasekera is an alumnus of PLA National Defence University in China, and had obtained the post-graduation - Master of Military Science and Strategic Studies MSc(MS&S) along with the title of ndu. apart from that, he had privilege to conduct with the following as well.

- PRC 1077/1099 Tactical Radio Repair and Maintenance Course, United States - 1998.
- Multinational Peacekeeping Operation Exercise, Wheeler Army Air Field, Hawaii, United States.
- Multinational Communication Interoperability Program (MCIP), Philippines and United States.
- Signals Mid-Career Course, Military Collage of Signal, Pakistan - 2003.
- Senior Command Course, Military College of War, Mhow, India) - 2011.
- Signal Young Officers' Course, Military Collage of Telecommunication and Engineering, Mhow, India - 1989.
- Battalion Commanders Course, Army Training School (Sri Lanka), MaduruOya.

== Medals, awards and decorations ==
Chandrasekera received few awards in the Sri Lankan armed forces, which includes the Vadamarachchi Operation Medal, Riviresa Campaign Services Medal, Ceylon Armed Services Long Service Medal.

Eastern Humanitarian Operations Medal	Sewabhimani Padakkama	Sewa Padakkama	
Northern Humanitarian Operations Medal	Purna Bhumi Padakkama	North and East Operations Medal	Vadamarachchi Operation Medal
Riviresa Campaign Services Medal	50th Independence Anniversary Commemoration Medal	Sri Lanka Army 50th Anniversary Medal	Sri Lanka Armed Services Long Service Medal

== Retirement and current employment ==
Prasanna Chandrasekera completed 34 plus years of service in the Sri Lanka Army and retired on 9 September 2020. During his tour of duty, he participated in most of the military operations conducted against terrorism in Sri Lanka, upholding different responsibilities in various command, staff and instructional appointments with his ranks held that blends with his wide experience in the field. He is currently working as the private secretary to Seetha Arambepola at the ministry of skills development and vocational training, research & innovations (MoSTR).

== Family ==
Chandrasekera is married to Praveena Bandara Chandrasekera, who was the 18th Chairperson of Seva Vanitha Unit at the Sri Lanka Army Women's Corps. They have one daughter and a son.

== See also ==
- Dharmaraja College, Kandy
- Sri Lankan civil war
- Master-General of the Ordnance
- Major General

Military offices
Preceded by Jayashantha Gamage	Master-General of the Ordnance; December 2019 - September 2020	Succeeded by Kuma Peiris
Preceded by Jagath Gunawardena	Director General Real Estate and Quartering; January 2019 - November 2019	Succeeded by Priyanka Fernando
