= National Cadet Corps (Sri Lanka) =

Youth organisation in Sri Lanka, sponsored by its Ministry of Defence

- ජාතික ශිෂ්‍යභට බලකාය (Sinhala)
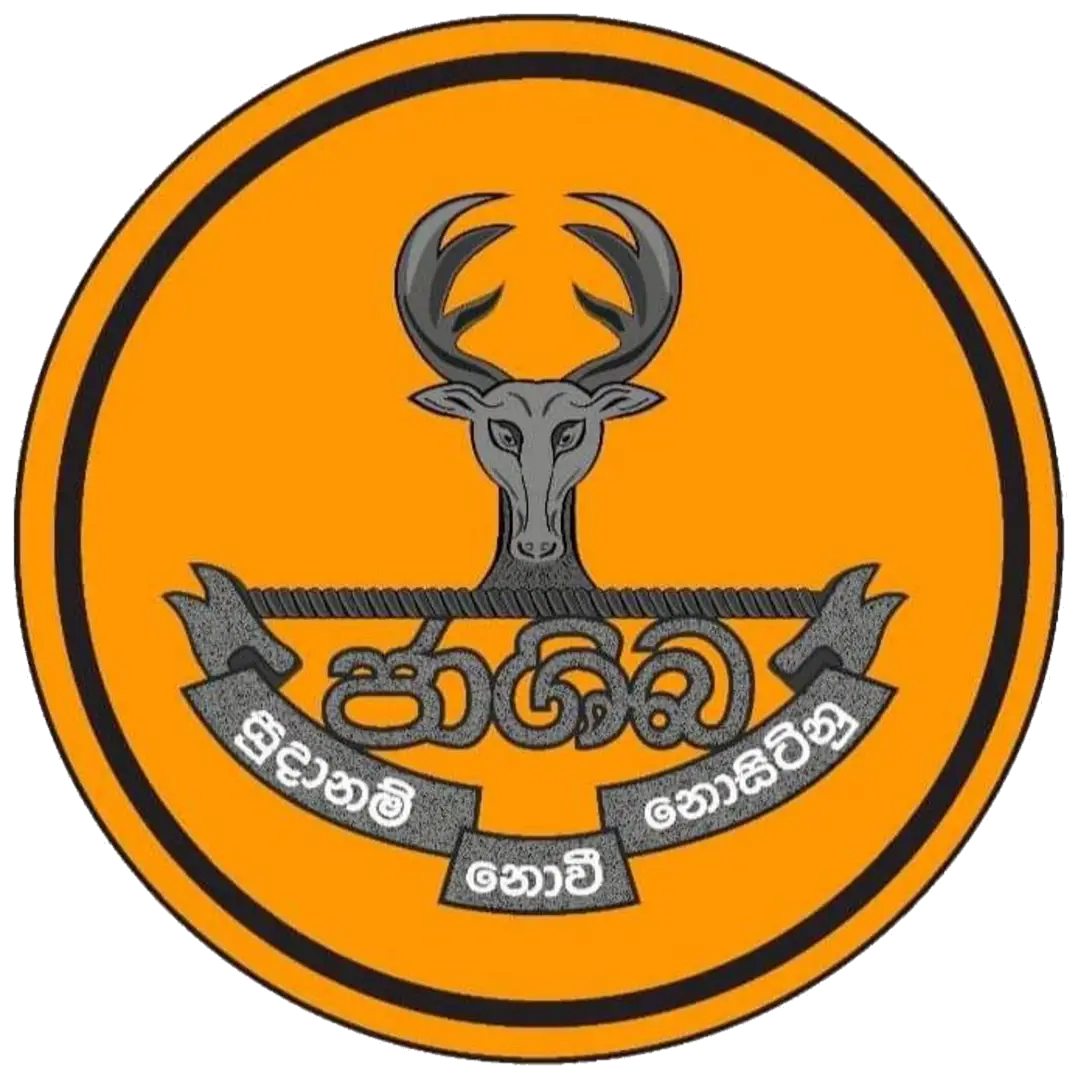
- Logo of the National Cadet Corps of Sri Lanka
- Founded: April 1881; 145 years ago
- Country: Sri Lanka
- Role: Volunteer Youth Organization
- Size: 30 Battalions, 4,492 Platoons (4,213 Cadet Platoons and 279 Band Platoons) and over 100,000 members
- Headquarters: No 15, Dutugemunu Street, Pamankada, Dehiwala, Sri Lanka.
- Mottos: සූදානම් නොවී නොසිටිනු; Sudanam Novi Nositinu; "Never be unprepared"; Nonquam non paratus ஆயத்தமில்லாமல் இருக்காதீர்கள் නකදාචිද් අසං විහිතඃ
- Anniversaries: 29 April
- Battle honours: President's Colours, Corps Colours
- Website: cadet.gov.lk

Commanders
- Director: Maj Gen. APCR Premathilaka RSP USP ndc

The National Cadet Corps (NCC; Sinhala: ජාතික ශිෂ්‍යභට බලකාය, romanized: jātika śiṣyabhaṭa balakāya) is a volunteer youth organisation in Sri Lanka, sponsored by the Ministry of Defence, which operates in schools. Its activities (Cadet and Cadet Band) are open for secondary school students on voluntary basis and its officers are government teachers and educational administrators, who serve as instructors.

The National Cadet Corps presently consists of 9 Provincial Headquarters, 2 Training Centres, and 30 Battalions deployed island wide. Approximately, 100,000 school cadets organized in to 4492 cadet platoons, including 279 cadet band platoons, are registered and trained by the NCC. Cadets are given basic military training in small arms and parades, as well as leadership training. The Corps is also given the grand opportunity to march alongside the forces during the Independence Day Parade of Sri Lanka.

The NCC is headed by a Director of a senior military rank, commonly a Major General, who is appointed by his excellency, the president of Sri Lanka. Although its officers and cadets have no liability for active military service many officers volunteer for secondment to the Sri Lanka Armed forces during national emergencies or are mobilized under national service. Traditionally the Cadet Corps has served as a source for officers for the regular forces of the Sri Lankan military.

Administered under the Mobilization and Supplementary Forces Act, No. 40 of 1985, the corps was renamed from time to time and in 1988, under the initiative of the government and then Minister of Education, Youth Affairs & Employment, and Deputy Minister of Manpower Mobilization, Hon Ranil Wickremesinghe, it was designated as the "National Cadet Corps" thereby discontinuing its attachment to Sri Lanka Army Volunteer Force and merging both Defence & Police cadetting under one organization. It is notable that the former president, Hon Ranil Wickremesinghe had the opportunity to present President's colours and Corps colours to the NCC on 19 February 2023.

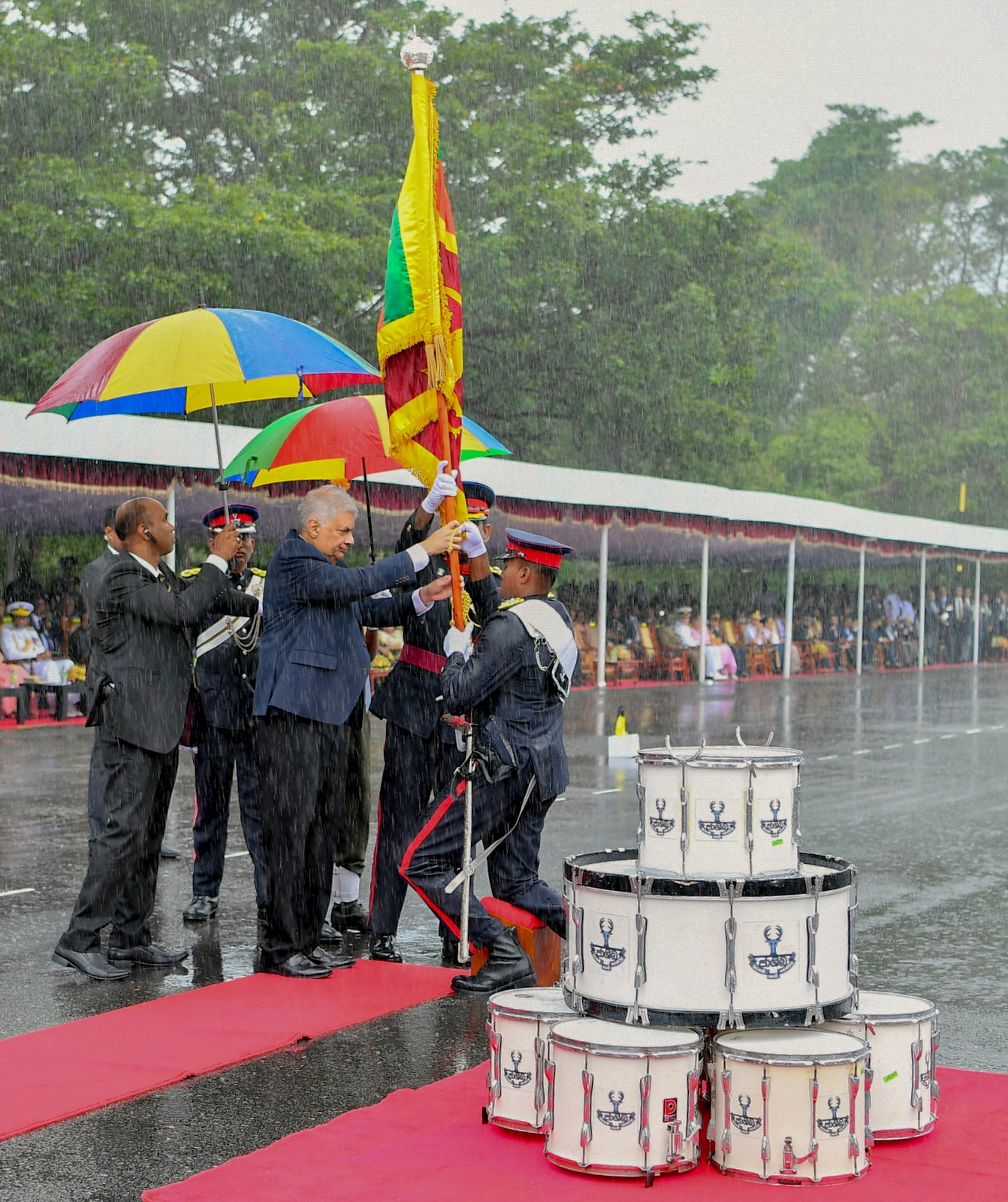
President's and Corps colours were awarded to the NCC by President Ranil Wickremesinghe on 19 February 2023

The first NCC Training Centre was established at Rantambe in 1990 during the tenure of Maj Gen EG Thevanayagam as Director and was declared open by then Secretary of Defence Gen Cyril Ranathunga VSV. Thereafter, on 4 April 2024, the second Training Centre was opened at Mullaitivu by then State Minister of Defence Hon Premitha Bandara Tennakoon, courtesy of the Ministry of Defence and Sri Lanka Army during the tenure of the then Secretary Defense, Gen (Rtd) GDHK Gunaratne WWV RWP RSP USP ndc MPhil, then Commander of the Army, Lt Gen HLVM Liyanage RWP RSP ndu, and the 14th Director of NCC, Maj Gen GS Fonseka USP psc.

== Mission statement ==
The mission statement of the National Cadet Corps is

To train and inspire every school cadet through effective training curriculum which inculcate core values of NCC and mould them to become competent and effective leaders within and outside the school

The Vision of the National Cadet Corps is

‍To mainstream the school cadetting in Sri Lanka by establishing a cadet platoon in every school possible and thereby groom youth to be dynamic, versatile and disciplined citizens with extra-ordinary leadership qualities to face utmost challenges in the society.

== Initiation of cadetting and its early history ==
The first Regiment of the Ceylon Volunteer Force was established as Ceylon Light Infantry Volunteers in April 1881. The pioneer of school cadetting, Mr. John B. Cull, then principal of Royal College, Colombo, formed a cadet platoon with the intention of promoting "discipline through drill" among students. This developed to be an auxiliary battalion to the Ceylon Light Infantry (CLI) Volunteers.

By 1902, more schools such as S. Thomas' College, Mt. Lavinia; Wesley College, Colombo; Trinity College, Kandy; and Richmond College, Galle joined and became companies of the "Cadet Battalion, Ceylon Light Infantry" (CB CLI) during the tenure of Maj Morris, who was then the Commanding Officer of CLI Volunteers and also the Acting Commandant of the Army Volunteer Force. Some cadets had voluntarily joined the British Forces and took part in the Boer War in South Africa. During the 1915 Sinhalese-Muslim riots, cadets who joined British forces were called upon to control the riots that spread across Ceylon.

Training of the cadets took place in Uragasmanhandiya until 1903, and subsequently cadets began their training alongside the British Forces at Diyatalawa. Later, they were trained separately. As Cadets joining British Forces declined, cadetting was recognized as an activity for school students up to 16 years, thereby allowing junior cadetting to be initiated. School cadetting was commanded by selected school teachers and subalterns from schools, who eventually became officers of the organization. Past cadet companies were led by officers of the CLI Volunteers.

The "De Soysa Trophy" in memory of Mr. AJR De Soysa (Former Member of the Legislative Council of Ceylon) awarded to winning Junior Cadets, was first won by St. Benedict's College, Kotahena in 1913 according to records.

Ceylonese lawyer, judge and legislator Hermann Albert Loos, awarded the "Hermann Loos Challenge Trophy" in 1917, to the best senior platoon, which was first won by Kingswood College, Kandy.

== Involvement in World Wars ==
During World War I, out of 330 cadets who volunteered to join the British Forces and fought abroad, about 30% had either been injured or had sacrificed their lives in battle.

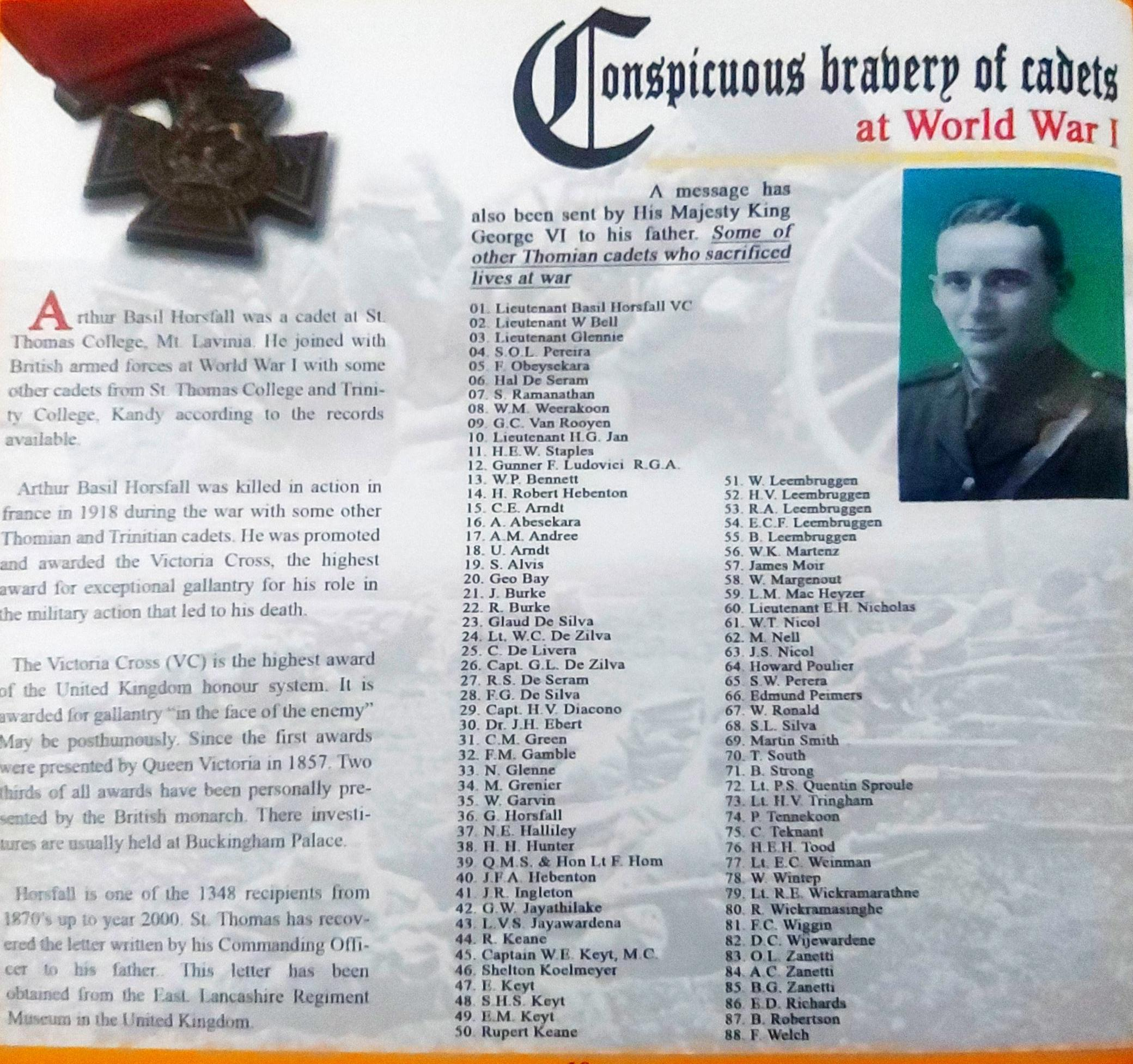
An article listing the details of cadets from Ceylon who displayed bravery during WWI and received honours from the British Monarch

One such honourable mention is Lt Arthur Basil Horsfall VC, who was a cadet from S. Thomas' College, Mt. Lavina. As per records, he joined the British armed forces alongside fellow cadets from S. Thomas' College, and Trinity College during World War 1.

In 1918, Horsfall was killed in action with some other cadets in France during the war. He was posthumously promoted and awarded the Victoria Cross – the highest award for exceptional gallantry in the face of the enemy, for his role in the military action that led to his fate.

Lt Horsfall is one of the 1348 recipients of this award from 1870's up to year 2000. St. Thomas' College has recovered the letter written by his Commanding Officer to his father. This letter has been obtained from the East Lancashire Regiment Museum in the United Kingdom. A message has also been sent by His Majesty, King George VI, to his father as well.

During World War II, from 1939 to 1945, both cadets and officers of the Cadet Corps joined the British and Ceylon Defence Forces and fought in the war.

== Progressive expansion ==
It was in 1919 that the cadet battalion was separated from the CLI, and was renamed as the Ceylon Cadet Battalion (CCB) which had registered 17 schools by then.

The Cadet Sports Meet commenced in 1923 and was the only central sports meet. This eventually evolved to be the "Public School Sports Meet."

In 1948, Col R. J. F. Mendis, the Commander of the Ceylon Cadet Battalion, was appointed as the Commandant of the Ceylon Defense Force (CDF). After gaining independence from the British rule and having deemed a dominion, the "Ceylon Army" was established in 1949. Subsequently, in 1950, the "Ceylon Cadet Battalion" (CCB) was named the "Ceylon Cadet Corps" (CCC) and was reformed as a regiment under the Ceylon Army Volunteer Force (CVF).

In the same year, the HQ of the 1st battalion of the CCC was initially established in Kalutara whereas that of the 2nd battalion was established in Kandy. In 1953, the 1st CCC battalion HQ was shifted to Galle, and the 3rd CCC battalion HQ was raised in Colombo. In 1964, the 4th CCC battalion was raised in Kurunegala and in 1968, the 5th CCC battalion was raised in Anuradhapura. Meanwhile, in 1963, four Cadet Bands were formed.

With the Ceylon Army making significant progress through the years, officers of the CCC pioneered to establish the "Pioneer Corps" of the Ceylon Army. It is notable that officers from the CCC were summoned to serve alongside regular and volunteer officers of the Ceylon Army. Such occasions include their contributions to suppress the harbour strike of 1962, and the insurgency of 1971 in the country where 100 CCC officers were called for duties with regular force officers.

Once Sri Lanka was declared as a Republic in 1972, the Cadet Corps was once again renamed. Thereafter the Ceylon Cadet Corps (CCC) was dubbed the "Sri Lanka Cadet Corps" (SLCC). On 4 July of the same year, the Police Cadet Corps was established with 5 boys' schools and 1 girls' school.

Afterwards in 1979, the 6th battalion was raised in Diyatalawa. Two years later, in 1981, the centenary celebration of the Cadet Corps was celebrated in Colombo. Nevertheless, many changes had come into effect by then – junior cadetting was discontinued and a proposal to establish a new national organization for cadetting was presented to the parliament by the Minister of Education, Youth Affairs & Employment and the Deputy Minister of Manpower Mobilization at the time, Hon Ranil Wickremesinghe.

Cadetting for girls in the SLCC began in 1985 with 10 girls' schools registered. The De Soysa Challenge Trophy, previously awarded to the best junior cadet platoon, was thenceforth awarded to the best girls' platoon.

== Establishment of the National Cadet Corps ==
Soon after, the Manpower Mobilization and Supplementary Forces Act, No 40 of 1985 was enacted as per the proposal brought to the house. During the tenure of the first Executive President of Sri Lanka, Hon JR Jayawardene, and then Minister of Education, Youth Affairs & Employment and the Deputy Minister of Manpower Mobilization, Hon Ranil Wickremesinghe, the activities of the SLCC and Police Cadet Corps were amalgamated to form the "National Cadet Corps" (NCC) in 1988. At the time, Lt Gen JED Perera VSV was the chairman of the Reserve Affairs Council and Maj Gen EG Thevanayagam VSV was appointed as the first director of the NCC.

After 48 years of administration by the Sri Lanka Volunteer Force, the NCC was transferred directly under the Ministry of Defence. Since then, NCC officers have been mobilized for active service to combat insurgency and terrorism, which had reached a new peak in 1989. Approximately 500 officers were mobilised for combat duties.

The NCC Training Centre was established on 2 December 1990 at Rantambe under the direction of Maj Gen E. G. Thevanayagam and was officially declared open by then Secretary Defense Gen Cyril Ranatunga VSV.

The 7 NCC battalion was raised in Gampaha in 1989. The 8 NCC in Pelmadulla and 9 NCC in Kegalle were raised in 1991. The battalions 10 NCC and 11 NCC were raised in Tangalle and Polonnaruwa in 1994 while in 2000, the battalions 12 NCC and 13 NCC were raised in Kalutara and Matale respectively. The 14 NCC battalion was raised in 2002 at Kuliyapitiya.

On 8 May 2001, the NCC HQ was established at No 68, Bandaranayake Mawatha, Kalubowila, Dehiwala courtesy of the Ministry of Education. Later it was shifted to its current location at No 15, Dutugemunu Street, Pamankada, Dehiwala on 30 September 2006. This was the year the corps celebrated its 125th anniversary with over 900 cadet platoons registered under its battalions.

Given that Sri Lanka was in a prolonged armed conflict over the years, government officials such as Gotabaya Rajapaksa, then Secretary Defense, had recognized a need for specialised training instead of the tradition of training all cadets under a single program. In 2007, the NCC had commenced Navy and Air force wings, making the classification of platoons similar to the National Cadet Corps of India. Although this decision was deemed a significant milestone, it was eventually suppressed and removed for better reorganisation.

The 15 NCC battalion was raised in Monaragala in 2007 as well. This was followed by the 16 NCC battalion which was raised in Matara in 2008.

Before achieving victory in the 30-year separatist war in May 2009, a number of NCC Officers had fought alongside the armed forces to defend the sovereignty, unity and territorial integrity of Sri Lanka.

In the years from 2009 to 2013, a number of battalions were raised throughout the country, including battalions 19 NCC, 20 NCC, 21 NCC, 22 NCC, 23 NCC, 24 NCC which were located at Pannipitiya, Jaffna, Trincomalee, Vavuniya, Kundasale, and Thissamaharamaya respectively. In 2014, 9 Girls' battalions were raised in all provinces of the country. The 34 NCC battalion was raised in Mullaitivu in the same year.

The centenary Hermann Loos Challenge Trophy Camp was held in 2017, at the NCC Training Centre, Rantambe. The winning trophy was won by De Mazenod College, Kandana. The Inter Province Sports Meet was held on 6 and 7 July 2019, at the Sugathadasa Stadium where Hon Ranil Wickremesinghe, who was then Prime Minister of the Democratic Socialist Republic of Sri Lanka, graced the event as its chief guest.

It was in 2020 that the Cadet platoons were reorganized as Defence and Police Platoons, suppressing Navy and Air Force platoons. During the COVID-19 pandemic, the annual national camps were not held until 2022. Nonetheless, in 2020, the Ananda College Past Cadet Band Association presented the "Bvt Col GW Rajapaksha ED Memorial Challenge Trophy" for the Best Boy Cadet of the Hermann Loos Challenge Trophy Camp whereas in 2022, the Royal College Past Cadets (1986/1987) presented the "Lt Col MAC Perera RSP Memorial Challenge Trophy" to the Best Girl Cadet of the De Soysa Challenge Trophy Camp.

== The legacy continued ==
Despite setbacks of the COVID-19 pandemic, the NCC was able to reach multiple new milestones in its history afterwards. Maj Gen PWB Jayasundara VSV USP ndc USACGSC IG took over duties as the 13th Director of the NCC on 13 January 2021. In order to reemerge from the dormancy during the crises that occurred in Sri Lanka, his leadership allowed the activities of the NCC to function smoothly once more.

With a plan foreseen, the NCC introduced online classes for cadets island wide. Battalion level and provincial level assessment camps, band camps, police camps and officer training courses were held as per the schedule. The culmination of the efforts was seen in October 2022 where the Herman Loos and De Soysa Camps were held at the NCC Training Centre, Rantambe for the first time after the pandemic. Having seen the commendable standards, the Secretary Defense whom was the chief guest of the event, pledged to award the NCC with honours. Before his retirement, Maj Gen PWB Jayasundara VSV USP ndc USACGSC IG, had set the background and contributed much to achieving the President's and Corps colours for the NCC.

On 12 January 2023, Maj Gen G. S. Fonseka took over the appointment as the 14th Director of the NCC. Having started as a cadet at Dharmaraja college who had climbed through the ranks at the Sri Lanka Army, he was well renowned for his efficient, timely and disciplined nature. Soon after his appointment, under his firm leadership, a robust action plan was created for the way forward of the NCC.

Marking one of its most iconic milestones, the President's Colours and Corps Colours were awarded to the NCC by the President of Sri Lanka, Ranil Wickremesinghe, at the ceremony held at the NCC Training Centre, Rantambe on 19 February 2023. Gracing the event the State Minister of Defence, Premitha Bandara Tennakoon; Governor of the Central Province of Sri Lanka, Lalith U. Gamage; Chief of Staff of the President and Senior Advisor to the President; Sagala Ratnayake; Secretary to Ministry of Defence, Gen (Retd) Kamal Gunaratne; Chief of Defence Staff, Gen Shavendra Silva; Commander of the Army, Lt Gen Vikum Liyanage; Commander of the Navy, Vice Admiral Priyantha Perera; President Army Seva Vanitha Unit, Janaki Liyanage; Director, NCC, Maj Gen G. S. Fonseka and Tri-Service officers, were present to witness the ceremony. Addressing the gathering, the president commended the cadet corps for its contributions to the country, and emphasised the need of disciplined leaders to serve the country and its future.

With the newly bestowed honours, the cadet corps gained more recognition both locally and internationally. The NCC Youth Exchange Programmes within SAARC countries, which had stopped in 2019, started again. Each year delegations composed of cadets (male and female) selected on merit basis in interviews and tests, along with selected NCC officers are given this rare opportunity, allowing them to experience different cultures and build international understanding through shared experiences. In May 2024, officials from the United States Army had shared their expertise on modern techniques of first aid with cadets at the Rantambe Training Centre, further strengthening diplomatic bonds between the two countries.

As per the president's concept of establishing cadet platoons in all national schools in the country, timely discussions between the Director of the NCC and relevant authorities, lead to fruitful outcomes. The NCC was able to start initiatives to further develop cadetting as means to foster strong connections between youths from all ethnicities, with the aim of grooming future leaders and creating disciplined citizens to the country.

The Sri Lanka Army officially handed over the Infantry Battalion Training School located at Nandikadal to the NCC to establish a second training centre. After completing all the necessities to begin training, the second NCC Training Centre - Mullaitivu was opened on 4 April 2024 by then State Minister of Defence, Hon Premitha Bandara Tennakoon. This effort not only encouraged schools from the northern, north-central and eastern provinces to engage in cadetting, but also in overcoming certain barriers that students had faced. Hence this increased the number of platoons as well as cadets by a considerable amount.

The NCC also introduced new ceremonial uniforms to Defence cadets and a new costume to Band cadets, which were first displayed at the 76th Independence Day Parade of Sri Lanka at Galle Face on 4 February 2024.

On the visionary concept of then Minister of Defence, the "National Youth Hero Award" was introduced through the NCC to honour young Sri Lankan heroes in recognition of exceptional bravery and selfless action towards the well-being of others. The first two awards were presented at the NCC HQ in Pamankada on 17 July 2024 to two teenage students whose acts of dynamic heroism, rescued the lives of others during emergencies despite risking their own. The recipients were master Sasindu Nimsara – a student of Kivula Piriwena, Mahakumbukkadawala, Puttlam, and miss Charithma Dinendri – a student of Siri Piyarathana Vidyalaya in Padukka.

Recently, on 15 February 2025, the acquisition of a purpose-built vehicle to transport the colours, was accomplished courtesy of the Sri Lanka Army; the former commander, Lt Gen Vikum Liyanage RWP RSP ndu; the present commander of the Army, Lt Gen Lasantha Rodrigo RSP ctf-ndu psc IG, and the Corps of Electrical and Mechanical Engineering.

Marking the end of his chapter in this decorative journey of the NCC, Maj Gen GS Fonseka USP psc retired on 18 February 2025.

== Organisation ==
=== Headquarters ===
Headquarters National Cadet Corps – Colombo

- General Staff Branch
- Corps' Secretary Branch
- Admin Quartering Branch
- Procurement Branch
- Finance Branch
- Headquarters Battalion

=== Battalions ===
National Cadet Corps has 34 Battalions located in;

- 1st NCC Battalion – Galle
- 2nd NCC Battalion – Kandy
- 3rd NCC Battalion – Colombo
- 4th NCC Battalion – Kurunagala
- 5th NCC Battalion – Anuradhapura
- 6th NCC Battalion – Badulla
- 7th NCC Battalion – Gampaha
- 8th NCC Battalion – Rathnapura
- 9th NCC Battalion – Kegalla
- 10th NCC Battalion – Tangalla
- 11th NCC Battalion – Polonnaruwa
- 12th NCC Battalion – Kalutara
- 13th NCC Battalion – Matale
- 14th NCC Battalion – Kuliyapitiya
- 15th NCC Battalion – Monaragala
- 16th NCC Battalion – Matara
- 17th NCC Battalion – Ampara
- 18th NCC Battalion – Nuwara Eliya
- 19th NCC Battalion – Padukka
- 20th NCC Battalion – Jaffna
- 21st NCC Battalion – Trincomalee
- 22nd NCC Battalion – Vavuniya
- 23rd NCC Battalion – Kundasale
- 24th NCC Battalion – Debarawewa
- 25th NCC Girl Battalion – North Western Province
- 26th NCC Girl Battalion – Western Province
- 27th NCC Girl Battalion – Southern Province
- 28th NCC Girl Battalion – Central Province
- 29th NCC Girl Battalion – Sabaragamuwa Province
- 30th NCC Girl Battalion – Northern Province
- 31st NCC Girl Battalion – Eastern Province
- 32nd NCC Girl Battalion – North Central Province
- 33rd NCC Girl Battalion – Uwa Province
- 34th NCC Battalion – Mulathivu
- 35th NCC Battalion – Puttlam
- 36th NCC Battalion – Kilinochchi
- 37th NCC Battalion – Mannar
- 38th NCC Battalion – Batticoloa
- NCC Training Centre, Rantambe
- NCC Training Centre, Mulathivu

== Training ==
NCC officers are trained in the National Cadet Corps officers' course at the Volunteer Force Training School, Diyatalawa. All Cadets undergo practical and theoretical training at their platoon and company level in the areas such as Physical Fitness, Foot Drill, Weapon Training and Firing, Map Reading, Field Craft, First Aid, Regimental Duties, Confidence Building Course, Leadership Activities, Fire Fighting, etc. Annually assessment camps at battalion level are held at NCC Training Centre, Rantambe while Naval Cadet assessment camps are held in the Naval and Maritime Academy and Air Force Cadet assessment Camps of the SLAF Diyatalawa. The standard issued service weapon of NCC is the T56-2 variant of the Type 56 assault rifle.

=== Trophies ===
- Hermann Loos Championship Trophy – awarded annually to the best performing cadet platoon from a boys' school since 1917, named after Hermann Albert Loos a senior District Judge of Ceylon
- T. T. R. De Soysa Champion – awarded annually to the best performing cadet platoon from a girls' school
- General T. I. Weeratunga Challenge Shield – awarded annually to the best performing Western Cadet Band from a boys school
- Best Eastern Band Championship Trophy
- Junior Cadet Championship Trophy (Since 2016)

=== Training Course ===
- Junior Leadership Course for Cadets & Sramabimani
- Cadets' Advance Course
- Probationary Officers' Course
- Young Officers' Course
- Officers' Training Course
- Junior Command Course
- Senior Command Course
- Band Platoons Commanders' Course
- Band NCOs, Course for Cadets
- Computer Course for Cadets
- Computer Course for ORs
- Computer Course for Three Forces and Police Officers
- English Language course for Cadets
- English Language Course for ORs
- English Language Course for Tri-Forces and Police Officers
- Sinhala Language Course for Cadets
- Sinhala Language Course for ORs
- Tamil Language Course for Cadets
- Tamil Language Course for ORS
- Tamil Language Course for Tri-Forces and Police Officers
- Drivers' Course
- Counselling Course
- University Entrance Course
- PSI Course
- Clerks Course

== Ranks within the NCC ==
Ranks in the NCC follow the pattern of those in the Sri Lanka Army.

=== Officers ===
NCC Officers are similar to volunteer officers, wear similar uniforms and insignia. Until 1988, Cadet Corp officers were commissioned officers of the Sri Lanka Army Volunteer Force. Following the formation of the NCC, its officers are commissioned and promoted by the President of Sri Lanka with all appointments published in the Government Gazette. Only Sri Lankan citizens who are academic staff members of government school, government approved private school or piriwena, belonging to either the Sri Lanka Teacher Educator Service, Sri Lanka Principle Service, Sri Lanka Teacher Advisors' Service and the Sri Lanka Teacher Service can serve as NCC officers.

Insignia							
Rank	Colonel	Lieutenant Colonel	Major	Captain	Lieutenant	Second Lieutenant	Probationary Officer

Senior NCC officers serve with the Armed Services and National Cadet Corps as mobilized officers, while others serve in the education field.

=== Cadets ===
Insignia							No insignia
Rank	Warrant officer class I	Warrant officer class II	Staff sergeant	Sergeant	Corporal	Lance corporal	Cadet
Supplementary ranks	Corps Regimental Sergeant Major (one in a Corps), Battalion Regimental Sergeant Major (one in a battalion)	Battalion Regimental Quarter Master Sergeant (one in a battalion), Company Sergeant Major (one in a Company)	Company Quarter Master Sergeant (one in a Company)	Five in a Company	Fifteen in a Company	Fifteen in a Company	

== Medals ==
Medals authorized for award of SLCC and NCC officers by the President of Sri Lanka.

Service orders

- Karyakshama Seva Vibhushanaya (KSV) – 1990–present

Commemorative medals

- Sri Lanka Army 25th Anniversary Medal – 1974
- Sri Lanka Army Volunteer Force Centenary Medal – 1981
- Sri Lanka Army 50th Anniversary Medal – 1999
- 75th Independence Day Commemoration Medal – 2023

In addition, SLCC/NCC officers seconded to or attached to the Sri Lanka Army for operational requirements would be eligible for Awards and decorations of the Sri Lanka Armed Forces.

== Past Commanding Officers (1902–1987) ==
Regimental Commanders of CCB, CCC, and SLCC

- 1902–1910: Maj SM Barros
- 1905–1910: Maj James Von Langenberg CLI
- 1910–1915: Maj V Van Langenberg ED CLI
- 1916–1917: Maj WE Gratiaen
- 1917–1932: Maj Edwin Evans
- 1923–1932: Col LMCD Robinson ED
- 1932–1938: Col SA Packman OBE MC
- 1938–1943: Col Robert Patrick ED
- 1943–1948: Col RJF Mendis OBE ED
- 1948–1951: Lt Col HVC De Silva ED
- 1951–1955: Col R Sabanayagam OBE
- 1955–1960: Bvt Col TN Munasinghe
- 1960–1961: Lt Col HCF Abeykoon ED
- 1961–1965: Lt Col HSR Gunawardana
- 1965–1968: Lt Col PD Ramanayaka
- 1968–1969: Lt Col EA Perusinghe ED
- 1969–1973: Bvt Col GW Rajapaksha ED
- 1973–1977: Bvt Col KGP Nilame ED
- 1977–1980: Bvt Col RB Narampanawe EDJP
- 1980–1984: Bvt Col NBS Balalle
- 1984–1987: Lt Col HKDA Fernando

== Past Directors (1987 and onwards) ==
- 1987–1991: Maj Gen EG Thevanayagam VSV
- 1991–1991: Col HW Senevirathna (Actg)
- 1991–1994: Brig B Justus Rodrigo VSV
- 1994–1999: Maj Gen TN De Silva USP
- 1999–2000: Col YL Kulasooriya (Actg)
- 2000–2002: Brig GSM Ranatunge USP
- 2002–2002: Col RM Somapala (Actg)
- 2002–2004: Maj Gen IWR Wijerathne USP
- 2004–2005: Brig DHMRB Thammita RSP Ldme
- 2005–2013: Maj Gen GBW Jayasundara RWP RSP
- 2013–2015: Maj Gen HMHA Herath MSc psc
- 2015–2016: Maj Gen LWCBB Rajaguru RWP USP Ldmc
- 2016–2018: Maj Gen AKP Wickramasinghe VSV USP
- 2018–2019: Maj Gen MMS Perera psc
- 2019–2021: Maj Gen JR Kulatunge RSP ndc psc
- 2021–2023: Maj Gen PWB Jayasundara VSV USP ndc USACGSC IG
- 2023–2025: Maj Gen GS Fonseka USP psc
- 2025–present: Maj Gen APCR Premathilaka RSP USP ndc

== See also ==
- Cadets (youth program)
