= Dampath Fernando =

Sri Lankan army general

Major General Dampath Fernando
- Military career
- Allegiance: Sri Lanka
- Branch: Sri Lanka Army
- Service years: 1983 – 2019
- Rank: Major General
- Unit: Gemunu Watch
- Commands: Chief of Staff; Deputy Chief of Staff; Mullaitivu Security Forces; 54 Division; 65 Division; 23 Division
- Conflicts: Sri Lankan Civil War; Insurrection 1987-89

Major General Dampath Fernando is a retired Sri Lankan army general. He was the 52nd Chief of Staff of the Sri Lanka Army and a former Colonel of the Regiment of the Gemunu Watch.

== Education and military career ==
On finishing his schooling at De Mazenod College Kandana, Fernando enlisted in the Sri Lanka Army through its 18th Officer Cadet Intake on 27 April 1983. Completing basic training at Diyatalawa, he was commissioned as a Second Lieutenant on 7 November 1984 and posted to the Gemunu Watch.

Operational commands he has held include:

- Battalion Commander, 5 Gemunu Watch
- Battalion Commander, 8 Gemunu Watch
- Brigade Commander 533 Brigade
- Brigade Commander, 512 Brigade
- General Officer Commanding, 23 Division (at the rank of Brigadier, in which role he oversaw the disarmament of the Tamil Makkal Viduthalai Pulikal in 2009)
- General Officer Commanding, 65 Division
- General Officer Commanding, 54 Division

He has also held a number of staff appointments, having been General Staff Officer II at the Directorate of Training, Army Headquarters, Brigade Major of 521 Brigade, Director Psychological Operations, Director Sports, Director General Operations & Systems at the office of the Chief of the Defence Staff, Officer Instructor at the General Sir John Kotelawala Defence University (KDU), Commanding Officer at KDU and Commandant of the Army Training School in Maduruoya.

Following the end of the civil war, Fernando was forced into retirement by Defense Secretary Gotabhaya Rajapakse in a reshuffle of senior officers in the army, due to his associations with- and loyalty to- Mahinda Rajapakse's presidential rival Sarath Fonseka, whom Fernando had served under for the length of Eelam War IV. He was reinstated by newly elected President Maithripala Sirisena in February 2015 and appointed Commander, Security Force Headquarters- Mullaitivu (SFHQ-MLT). On 4 August 2017, Fernando was appointed Deputy Chief of Staff, and promoted to Chief of Staff on 27 March 2018 and served till January 2019 when he retired from the service.

== Personal life ==
Fernando has represented Sri Lanka in basketball, and played squash for the Defence Services. He is a devout Roman Catholic.

Preceded by Major General Amal Karunasekara	Chief of Staff of the Army (Sri Lanka); March 2018- January 2019	Succeeded by Major General Shavendra Silva
