= Security Forces Headquarters – Central =

Regional command of the Sri Lanka Army

- ආරක්ෂක සේනා මූලස්ථානය - මධ්‍යම
- Security Force Headquarters Emblem
- Active: 14 March 2013 – Present
- Allegiance: Sri Lanka
- Branch: Sri Lanka Army
- Size: 2 Divisions
- Garrison/HQ: Diyatalawa Garrison, Diyatalawa
- Anniversaries: 14 March
- Website: alt.army.lk/sfhqcentral/

Commanders
- Commander Security Force (Central): Maj. Gen. A M C Abeykoon RWP RSP USP ndc
- GOC 11 INF DIV: Maj. Gen. H M G E Herath RSP USP ndu psc
- GOC 12 INF DIV: Maj. Gen. M P K L Amarasinghe WWV RWP RSP ndc

Security Forces Headquarters – Central (SFHQ-C) is a regional command of the Sri Lanka Army, that is responsible for the operational deployment and command all army units stationed in the Central and Southern parts of the island, this includes two divisions. The current Commander SFHQ-C is Major General M K S Silva RWP RSP ndu . The SFHQ-C is based at the Diyatalawa Garrison.

Although it is primary a command of the Sri Lanka Army it coordinates operations and deployments of ground units of the Navy, Air Force and police with that of the army in that area. Security Forces Headquarters – Central was formed splitting the Security Forces Headquarters – South which existed briefly.

Area of responsibility includes Kandy District, Matale District, Nuwara Eliya District, Badulla District, Monaragala District and Hambantota District.

== Composition ==
- 11 Infantry Division, Pallekele
  - 111 Infantry Brigade, Kandy
  - 112 Infantry Brigade, Badulla
- 12 Infantry Division, Hambantota
  - 121 Infantry Brigade, Monaragala
  - 122 Infantry Brigade, Weerawila

== Previous Commanders Security Forces Headquarters - Central ==
- Maj Gen H C P Goonetilleke RSP USP ndc psc
- Maj Gen U A B Medawela RSP USP ndu psc
- Maj Gen A M Perera RWP RSP psc
- Maj Gen A K S Perera WWV RWP RSP USP ndu
- Maj Gen A P de Z Wickramaratne RWP ndu psc
- Maj Gen P U S Vithanage RSP ndu
- Maj Gen M K D Perera RWP RSP USP ndu
- Maj Gen G R H Dias VSV USP ndc psc IG
- Maj Gen W R P De Silva USP ndu IG
- Maj Gen G J L Waduge RWP RSP USP VSV ndu
- Major General W D C K Costa RSP USP
- Major General H P N K Jayapathirana RSP
- Major General N R Lamahewage RWP RSP ndu
- Major General H L V M Liyanage RWP RSP ndu
- Major General M K S Silva RWP RSP ndu
- Maj Gen W R M M Rathanayake RWP RSP USP ndu
- Maj Gen W W H R R V M N D K B Niyangoda RWP RSF VSV USP ndu psc
- Major General S R B Aluvihare RWP RSP ndu psc
- Major General B K G M L Rodrigo RSP PSC IG
- Major General G M N Perera RWP RSP USP ndc
- Major General Y A B M Yahampath RWP RSP
- Major General D K S K Dolage USP nps psc
- Major General K A W N H Bandaranayake USP
