= Sanath Hettige =

Sri Lankan award winning consultant family physician

Sanath Hettige is a Sri Lankan consultant family physician, medical researcher, and inventor. He is known for his research work, particularly the use of Carica papaya leaf extract in the treatment of dengue fever, and for contributions to family medicine in Sri Lanka. His work has received national and international recognition for innovation and service to primary care.

== Early life and education ==
Hettige studied at Ananda College, Colombo, before completing his Bachelor of Medicine and Bachelor of Surgery (MBBS) at the University of Kelaniya. He obtained his Doctor of Medicine (MD) in Family Medicine from the Postgraduate Institute of Medicine (PGIM), University of Colombo. He also holds a Diploma in Family Medicine (DFM).

== Career ==
Hettige served as an honorary senior lecturer in Family Medicine at the University of Colombo. He has been a visiting lecturer and examiner for several Sri Lankan medical faculties, including the University of Jayewardenepura and the Kotelawala Defence University.

As on 2025, Hettige is serving as the president of IMPA.

== Research and Innovations ==
Hettige is best known for his early studies, exploring the potential therapeutic benefits of Carica papaya leaf extract in dengue fever. His findings reported improvements in platelet counts, reduced fever duration, and enhanced white blood cell recovery.

== Awards and Recognition ==
=== International awards ===
- Silver Medal – Indian International Innovation Fair (IIIF), Second Best Invention (2016)
- WONCA South Asia Regional Five-Star Doctor Award (2024)

=== Presidential and national awards ===
- Presidential Award for Best Medical Invention (Gold Prize, 2016)
- Presidential Award – Sri Lanka Inventors Commission (2013), First Place
- Platinum Award – Sri Lanka Inventors Commission

=== Academic and professional awards ===
- Dr. M.P.M. Cooray Memorial Award – CGPSL Orator Award (2016, 2018)
