= Diyathalawa bus blast =

The Diyathalawa bus blast resulted in injures to nineteen people who were travelling in a bus from Jaffna to Diyatalawa. The injured include twelve Sri Lankan military personnel, with two of them being grievously wounded. The incident occurred on 21 February 2018 at 5:45 AM at Kahagolla area in Diyathalawa. The blast was reported to be caused by a hand grenade exploding after it fell onto the floor of the bus. The Sri Lanka Army appointed a six-member committee to investigate the incident.
