= Compulsory leadership training for undergraduates =

Compulsory leadership training for undergraduates in Sri Lanka is a mandatory program introduced in 2011 by the Sri Lankan Government for all students select for undergraduate courses in state universities to undergo residential three-week leadership training and positive thinking development at training camps under the Defence Ministry which as lead to much controversy. The Sri Lankan Higher Education Ministry sought the university academics' and vice chancellors' views on the ongoing leadership training program and decided to reduce it from three weeks to two weeks.

== Proponents ==
It has been claimed by the Government that this program has been launched to increase employability of graduates thus reducing the high graduate unemployment in state universities. 10,000 students have been earmarked for the first group of training starting May 22, 2011, and a second group of 12,000 is set to follow on June 22 in order to cover the 2011-2012 state university undergraduate intake. Dr Sunil Navaratne, Secretary, Ministry of Higher Education stated that it was a "orientation programme for the university entrants to acquire universal education". Hon S. B. Dissanayake, Minister of Higher Education stated that content of this programme is carefully designed by the experts on education and physical and psychological health. The residential training is to be carried out at 28 camps include 18 army, two naval, two air force and four cadet and police camps according to Major General Milinda Peiris, Vice Chancellor/Commandant, Kotalawala Defence University. He further stated that prominence in the programme is given to leadership skills while conceptual skills, strategic management skills, conflict resolution skills, human skills will also be developed. Chairman of the University Grants Commission Prof Gamini Samaranayake had observed that it would be an "appropriate solution" for ragging.

== Critics ==
This move has drown criticisms from the opposition, student groups and human rights groups as the nature of compulsory military type training seen in conscription. Inter University Students' Federation filed a fundamental right's petition to the Supreme Court of Sri Lanka asking for an injunction order against the programme. Feedback received from the students, parents and university academics has been considered in preparing this year's program. The court rejected the petition.

== Controversy ==
One of the centers used in the program has been the center of controversy due to trainee deaths. The center which is a cadet training camp in Rantembe has been reported as having insufficient medical services with the absence of a doctor and also being seven kilometers away from the closest hospital. Two students have died at the camp in 2008 and 2011 during the leadership program for undergraduates, while a principal who was part of a similar leadership training program died in 2013.

== Reintroduction ==
In 2025, Sethsara Wanigasekara, a social entrepreneur and writer, called for the reintroduction of this programme as a solution to youth unrest and unemployment, as well as career guidance and skill development.

== See also ==
- Education in Sri Lanka
- Ragging in Sri Lanka
- conscription
- Compulsory Military Training in New Zealand
