= John Halangode =

Sri Lankan army officer and founder of the Gemunu Watch

Brigadier John Fredrick Halangode, VSV, was a Sri Lankan army officer who founded the Gemunu Watch. He served as the first commanding officer of the 1st Battalion, Gemunu Watch.

Educated at Trinity College, Kandy, Halangode joined the Ceylon Defence Force and was commissioned as a second lieutenant in the Ceylon Light Infantry in 1941 during World War II. After being demobilised at the end of the war, he joined the Ceylon Police Force.

Following the formation of the Ceylon Army in 1949, he was commissioned as a regular officer with the rank of captain and served as a company commander in the 1st Battalion, Ceylon Light Infantry. He attended training courses in the United Kingdom and Pakistan, after which he was appointed as the first officer commanding of the Army Recruit Training Depot in Diyatalawa. When the depot was expanded into the Army Training Centre, Diyatalawa, Halangode became its second-in-command and later commanding officer.

After the 1962 Ceylonese coup d'état attempt, the government decided to form a third infantry regiment. Lieutenant Colonel Halangode was selected as its first commanding officer. The Gemunu Watch was established in December 1962 with Halangode at its head, and he was instrumental in developing the regiment’s traditions and identity. Two volunteer battalions were subsequently raised in 1964 and 1965. Before his retirement, he served as Commander, Troops Colombo.

His son, Brigadier Hiran Halangode, RWP, RSP, USP, served as Brigade Commander of the 12th Brigade and the Air Mobile Brigade.
