= Gemunu Watch =

- ගැමුණු හේවා බළඇණිය
- Active: December 7, 1962 – present
- Country: Sri Lanka
- Branch: Sri Lanka Army
- Type: Infantry
- Role: Conventional warfare Assault; Reconnaissance
- Size: 28 battalions
- Regimental Centre The Gemunu Watch: Kuruwita Army Camp, Ratnapura.
- Nickname: Highlanders
- Motto: Terry Not Forward
- March: Highland Laddie
- Anniversaries: December 7 (Regimental day)
- Engagements: 1971 JVP Insurrection, Sri Lankan Civil War
- Website: Gemunu Watch Official Website

Commanders
- Centre Commandant: Brigadier K.M.N. Dikkumbura RSP
- Colonel of the Regiment: Major General A.M.A Abeywardana WWV RWP RSP ndc
- Notable commanders: Brig. John Halangode; Lt Gen Parami Kulatunga

The Gemunu Watch (GW) ("King Dutugemunu's Own") is a infantry regiment of the Sri Lanka Army, formed with troops from the Ceylon Light Infantry and the Ceylon Sinha Regiment in 1962. It has been deployed in many major operations against the LTTE. It is made up of 17 regular units, 1 RHQ unit and 9 volunteer units. Headquartered at Kuruwita Army Camp, Ratnapura. It is named after one of the most famous Lankan Kings, King Dutugemunu.

== History ==
The roots of the Gemunu Watch can be traced to the volunteer formations of the British Empire and the formation of the Ceylon Infantry Regiment by a Gazette notification on 1 April 1881. Later, in order to encourage the concept of volunteering, the volunteer force was expanded to include units at the district level. Accordingly, two Volunteer Detachments were set up in Galle and Matara in the old Dutch forts. Thereafter, the Ceylon Defence Force was established under Army Order No: 08 of 1910, to cater to the administration and discipline of these regiments, and came under the direct purview of the Commandant, Ceylon Defence Force. During World War I (1914 to 1918), the Ceylon Defence Force was engaged in active service and the troops deployed in Galle and Matara too were mobilized. After the War, the CDF was systematically "Ceylonised" by the appointment of Ceylonese officers as commanding officers of battalions.

Following Ceylon gaining self-rule in 1948, and the establishment of the Ceylon Army under the Army Act, the Ceylon Defence Force became the Ceylon Volunteer Force and the detachments in Galle and Matara were renamed as "B" Company of the 2nd Battalion (Volunteer), Ceylon Light Infantry. The "B" Company in Galle and Matara was renamed the Ruhuna Volunteer Regiment in 1950 with Colonel C. A. Dharmapala, its first commanding officer. In 1956, with the change in the national political leadership to the Sri Lanka Freedom Party, the Ruhuna Regiment did not find favour with the political hierarchy and was disbanded. Subsequently, in October 1956, the second Regular Infantry Battalion, the 1st Battalion of the Sinha Regiment, was established in the Imperial Camp in Diyatalawa. Thereafter, the 2nd [Volunteer] Battalion of the Sinha Regiment was raised in Kandy. When the Ruhuna Regiment was disbanded, the troops located in Galle and Matara were attached to various units. Subsequently, the troops that were deployed in Galle formed the "C" Company of the 2nd [Vol] Battalion of the Sinha Regiment. In the latter half of 1959, 110 soldiers deployed as "C" Company of the 2nd [Vol] Battalion, Sinha Regiment under the command of Capt. D.S. Amarasuriya were brought together to form a new Volunteer Unit called the Gemunu Regiment, which was raised in Galle on 23 November 1959. Capt. D.S. Amarasuriya was appointed the commanding officer. The new Unit did not have a flag or cap badge, therefore, it was originally proposed to have the image of a Leopard associated with the Yala Sanctuary with cross rifles designed for the cap badge. However, it was not adopted. As the Permanent Staff of the Unit was drawn from the Sinha Regiment, they followed the traditions associated with the Sinha Regiment.

The third Regular Infantry Regiment, the 1st Battalion of the Gemunu Watch, was raised at the Ceylon Volunteer Force [CVF] Camp in Diyatalawa on 7 December 1962, and subsequently occupied the Rangala Camp of the Royal Ceylon Navy and the Imperial Camp vacated by the Sinha Regiment (which had been moved to Colombo). As Gemunu originated in Ruhuna, the Volunteer Gemunu Regiment was established in Galle and the detachment located in Matara was renamed Gemunu Battalions and formed the Volunteer counterparts of the 1st Battalion of the Gemunu Watch.

The Founding Father and first commanding officer of the 1st Battalion of the Gemunu Watch, Lieut. Colonel John Halangode was from the 1st Battalion of the Ceylon Light Infantry. He was inspired by the traditions of the British Regiment, the Black Watch, and inculcated those norms and customs into the 1st Battalion of the Gemunu Watch. The nucleus of 1GW consisted of Officers and Other Rank Cadres drawn from the Regular Units already established.

== Units ==
No	Unit	Formed	Disbanded	Notes
1	1st Battalion, Gemunu Watch	7 December 1962		
2	2nd (V) Battalion, Gemunu Watch	1 October 1964		
3	3rd (V) Battalion, Gemunu Watch	1 September 1965		
4	4th Battalion, Gemunu Watch	27 December 1985		
5	5th Battalion, Gemunu Watch	1 June 1987		First unit to be formed in the battle field, Vasavilan Jaffna. First commanding officer was Lieutenant Colonel G.W.W. Perera.
6	6th Battalion, Gemunu Watch	22 May 1990		First commanding officer was Major M.M. Sumanasena
7	7th Battalion, Gemunu Watch	17 September 1992		On 13 June 2000, this unit was amalgamated with 5 Gemunu Watch and on 17 May 2005 the Battalion was re-designated as the 7th Battalion
8	8th Battalion, Gemunu Watch	28 January 1993		8 Gemunu Watch was amalgamated with the 6 Gemunu Watch on 9 June 2000 and on 17 May 2005, 8 Gemunu Watch re-commenced working as an independent Unit once again.
9	9th Battalion, Gemunu Watch	24 January 1994		On 18 June 2000, 9 Gemunu Watch was amalgamated with 1 Gemunu Watch and on 24 January 2002 it re-commenced functioning independently
10	10th (V) Battalion, Gemunu Watch	1 June 1994		
11	11th Battalion, Gemunu Watch	4 September 1996		On 17 May 2005, 11 Gemunu Watch was renamed as 7 Gemunu Watch. Later this Unit once more became 11 Gemunu Watch on 4 October 2007.
12	12th Battalion, Gemunu Watch	1 January 1997		12 Gemunu Watch was amalgamated with 4 Gemunu Watch on 12 June 2000, but became an independent Unit on 11 November 2002.
14	14th (V) Battalion, Gemunu Watch	7 January 1997		
15	15th (V) Battalion, Gemunu Watch	1 December 2007		
16	16th (V) Battalion, Gemunu Watch	9 May 2008		
17	17th Battalion, Gemunu Watch	16 October 2008		
18	18th Battalion, Gemunu Watch	1 December 2008		
19	19th Battalion, Gemunu Watch	12 January 2009		
20	20th (V) Battalion, Gemunu Watch	7 March 2009	21 November 2018	
21	21st (V) Battalion, Gemunu Watch	1 May 2009	15 November 2018	
22	22nd (V) Battalion, Gemunu Watch	29 July 2009	13 March 2012	
23	23rd Battalion, Gemunu Watch	15 October 2009		
24	24th Battalion, Gemunu Watch	9 November 2009		
25	25th Battalion, Gemunu Watch	25 September 2010		1st Reinforcement [RFT] Battalion formed on 25 September 2008 was renamed as 25 Battalion, Gemunu Watch on 25 September 2010
26	26th Battalion, Gemunu Watch	20 September 2010	25 April 2012	2nd RFT Battalion of the Gemunu Watch formed on 31 January 2009 was renamed as 26 Gemunu Watch on 20 September 2010.
27	27th Battalion, Gemunu Watch	20 September 2010	25 February 2012	3rd RFT Battalion of the Gemunu Watch formed on 16 April 2009 was re-designated as 27 Gemunu Watch on 20 September 2010.
28	HQ BN Battalion, Gemunu Watch			Initially formed as RFT Battalion of the Gemunu Watch on 17 January 1998. On 8 October 1999, the RFT Battalion was renamed the Headquarter Battalion.

== Major Operations ==
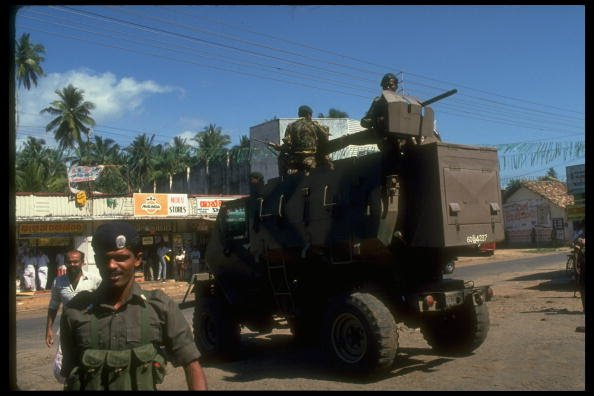
A Gemunu Watch soldier on patrol during the 1987–1989 JVP insurrection.

- Task Force Anti Illicit Immigration (TAFII)
- Anti-Smuggling
- 1971 JVP insurrection
- Operation Liberation (Vadamarachchi Operation)
- Sath Bala
- Balavegaya
- Thrivida Balaya
- Akunupahara
- Sun Island
- Green Belt I and II
- Operation Riviresa
- Edibalaya I and II
- Dasa Bala
- Operation Jayasikurui
- Randunna I and II
- Ranajaya
- Ranabala
- Operation Jayashakthi
- Ranagosa I, II, III, IV and V
- Kinihira VII
- Holding and securing the Kiran Camp in Batticaloa
- Eastern Theatre of Eelam War IV
- 2008–2009 Sri Lankan Army Northern offensive

== Recipients of the Parama Weera Vibhushanaya ==
- Corporal P. M. Nilantha Pushpa Kumara †
- Captain U. G. A. S. Samaranayake †
- Captain H. G. M. H. I. Megawarna †
- Lieutenant W. T. Jayatillake †

== Chiefs of Staff ==
- Brigadier Mano Madawela – 15th Chief of Staff of the Sri Lanka Army.
- Major General Lakshman Algama – 25th Chief of Staff of the Sri Lanka Army.
- Major General Patrick Fernando – 30th Chief of Staff of the Sri Lanka Army.
- Major General Lohan Gunawardena – 34th Chief of Staff of the Sri Lanka Army.
- Major General Dampath Fernando – 52nd Chief of Staff of the Sri Lanka Army.
- Major General Senarath Bandara – 57th Chief of Staff of the Sri Lanka Army.
- Major General Priyantha Perera – 58th Chief of Staff of the Sri Lanka Army.

== Deputy Chiefs of Staff ==
- Major General W. R. Wijerathne – 2 ^{nd} Deputy Chief of Staff of the Sri Lanka Army.
- Major General Parami Kulatunga – 18 ^{th} Deputy Chief of Staff of the Sri Lanka Army.

== Colonels of the Regiment ==
No	Colonel of the Regiment	Took office	Left office
1	Brigadier G. H. de Silva	19.03.1988	01.01.1989
2	Brigadier NPALDS De Wijesekara	01.01.1989	15.01.1990
3	Major General Lakshman Algama	15.01.1990	27.01.1990
4	Brigadier WR Wijerathne	27.01.1990	24.09.1991
5	Major General Lakshman Algama	24.09.1991	26.12.1992
6	Brigadier WR Wijerathne	26.12.1992	15.02.1994
7	Major General Lakshman Algama	15.02.1994	15.12.1994
8	Major General WMP Fernando	15.12.1994	24.08.1995
9	Major General GWW Perera	26.08.1995	20.01.1997
10	Major General WMP Fernando	20.01.1997	01.01.1999
11	Major General Parami Kulatunga	01.01.1999	24.01.1999
12	Major General GWW Perera	24.01.1999	24.03.2000
13	Major General Parami Kulatunga	25.03.2000	17.06.2002
14	Major General KB Egodawele	17.06.2002	17.07.2003
15	Major General Parami Kulatunga	17.07.2003	26.06.2006
16	Major General S Udumalagala	05.07.2006	05.02.2008
17	Major General LBR Mark	05.02.2008	18.09.2008
18	Major General MK Jayawardana	18.09.2008	17.08.2009
19	Major General LBR Mark	17.08.2009	05.05.2010
20	Major General S Udumalagala	06.05.2010	24.02.2013
21	Major General LBR Mark	24.02.2013	10.05.2014
22	Major General PUS Vithanage	10.05.2014	06.06.2017
23	Major General W B D P FERNANDO	2017.06.06	
24	Major General KPA Jayasekera		
25	Major General TS Bangsajayah	2019.10.19	2020.08.02
26	Major General BVDP Abeynayake	03.08.2020	10.12.2020
27	Major General HPNK Jayapathirane	11.12.2020	26.02.2021
28	Major General WGHAS Bandara	26.02.2021	16.07.2021
29	Major General SS Waduge	17.07.2021	05.10.2021
30	Major General WLPW Perera	06.10.2021	06.12.2021
31	Major General PML Chandrasiri	07.12.2021	08.05.2022
32	Major General AC Lamahewa	09.05.2022	02.03.2023
33	Major General EADP Edirisingha	03.03.2023	18.06.2023
34	Major General SWB Welagedara	18.06.2023	23.11.2024
35	Major General WBJK Wimalaratne	23.11.2024	22.10.2025
36	Major General AMA Abeyawardana	05.11.2025	Present

== Alliances ==
- United Kingdom – Black Watch

== Notable members ==
- General T. I. Weerathunga, VSV – 9th Commander of the Army & High Commissioner to Canada
- General G. H. De Silva, RWP, VSV, USP – 13th Commander of the Army & High Commissioner to Pakistan
- Lieutenant General Parami Kulatunga, RSP, USP † – Former Deputy Chief of Staff of the Army
- Major General Vijaya Wimalaratne, RWP, RSP, VSP, USP †- Was transferred to the Gajaba Regiment as its 1st commanding officer when it was formed.
- Major General Lakshman Algama, VSP, USP – Chief of Staff of the Army
- The Honourable Colonel C. A. Dharmapala, OBE, ED – first commanding officer of 3 (Volunteer) Battalion, former Permanent secretary to the Ministry of Defence and Security Advisor to the President J. R. Jayewardene, former Deputy Minister of Industries & Housing and was an ex Member of Parliament for Hakmana.
- Major General Lalin T Fernando – former Commander Security Forces Headquarters – Jaffna (SF HQ (J))
- Brigadier J. G. Balthazar – former Chief of Staff of the Army and former Commander, Security Forces Jaffna
- Brigadier Ariyasinghe Ariyapperuma † – Former Commander, Northern Command
- Brigadier John Halangode – first commanding officer and Commander Colombo Force
- Brigadier Hiran Halangode, RWP, RSP, USP, GW – Brigade Commander, 12th Brigade and Air Mobile Brigade
- Brigadier Rohitha Neil Akmeemana, RSP, USP – First commanding officer of the 9th battalion.
- Colonel Wickremasinghe Wimaladasa – Olympian and Asian Games gold medalist
- Colonel Rohitha Wickramathilake RSP, USP, GW – Commanding officer 4th Battalion.KIA in Kokilay, Welioya
- Lieutenant Colonel Srimal Mendis, RWP, GW † – Officer Commanding, 1GW, KIA in Velvettiturai.

== Order of precedence ==
Preceded by Sri Lanka Sinha Regiment	Order of Precedence	Succeeded by Gajaba Regiment

== External links and sources ==
- Sri Lanka Army
- Gemunu Watch
- THE GEMUNU WATCH EX-SERVICEMEN'S REGIMENTAL ASSOCIATION
- 45th Anniversary of Gemunu Watch

Specific
