= Channa Gunathilaka =

Sri Lankan army general

Channa Gunathilaka චන්න ගුණතිලක
- Military career
- Branch: Sri Lanka Army
- Service years: 1981–
- Rank: Major General
- Unit: Sri Lanka Engineers
- Commands: Sri Lanka Army Volunteer Force, Security Forces Headquarters – Central, Security Forces Headquarters – Kilinochchi, 56th Infantry Division
- Conflicts: Sri Lankan Civil War, Insurrection 1987-89
- Awards: Rana Sura Padakkama, Uttama Seva Padakkama

Major General Channa Gunathilaka, RSP, USP, ndc, psc, SLE (born 1963) was a senior officer of the Sri Lanka Army, who was the Deputy Chief of Staff of the Sri Lanka Army. He was the former Commandant of the Sri Lanka Army Volunteer Force, Security Force Commander (Central), Military Secretary, Security Force Commander (Kilinochchi), GOC - 56th Infantry Division, GOC - Mannar.

Educated at St. Benedict's College, Colombo and at the Royal College, Colombo, Gunathilaka went on to join the Sri Lanka Army in August 1981. Undergoing basic training at the Sri Lanka Military Academy in Diyatalawa, he won the “Sword of Honour” as the Best All Round Officer Cadet in his batch and was commissioned into the Sri Lanka Engineers as a Second Lieutenant. He is a graduate of the Defence Services Command And Staff College, Mirpur and the National Defence University, Pakistan where he gained a master's degree in Defence and Strategic Studies.

Serving with the Sri Lanka Engineers throughout the Sri Lankan Civil War, he went on to serve as the commanding officer of the 7th Field Engineer Regiment and Brigade Commander of the 551 Infantry Brigade and the 533 Infantry Brigade. He also served as the General Officer Commanding of the Mannar District and the 56th Infantry Division. He was also the Commander of the Security Forces Headquarters – Kilinochchi and Security Forces Headquarters – Central. At Army Headquarters he served as the Military Secretary of the General Staff and Director General Doctrine and Training as well as Director General, General Staff at the Office of the Chief of Defence Staff. General Gunathilaka has been awarded the Rana Sura Padakkama, Uttama Seva Padakkama, and the Sri Lanka Armed Services Long Service Medal among other medals.

In 2000, under a government initiative, he was instrumental in forming the Youth Corps. In 2014 he was awarded the “HR Leadership Award” at the Asia Pacific Human Resource Management Congress Awards in Bangalore.
