= Samaranayake =

Samaranayake is a surname. Notable people with the surname include:

- Anusha Samaranayake (born 1962), Sri Lankan former cricketer
- Gamini Samaranayake, Sri Lankan diplomat
- Lakshman Samaranayake, Sri Lankan academic
- Mark Samaranayake (1914–2000), Sri Lankan actor
- R. G. Samaranayake (1923–1992), Ceylonese politician
- V. K. Samaranayake (1939–2007), Sri Lankan computer scientist
