= Gunathilaka =

Gunathilaka is both a given name and a surname. Notable people with the name include:

- Gunathilaka Rajapaksha (born 1957), Sri Lankan politician
- Channa Gunathilaka (born 1963), Sri Lankan general
- Danushka Gunathilaka (born 1991), Sri Lankan cricketer
- Udayakantha Gunathilaka (born 1965), Sri Lankan politician
