= Balasuriya =

Balasuriya බාලසූරිය
- Pronunciation: Bālasūriya
- Language: Sinhala

Origin
- Region of origin: Sri Lanka

Other names
- Alternative spelling: Balasooriya

Balasuriya or Balasooriya (Sinhala: බාලසූරිය, romanized: Bālasūriya) is a Sinhalese surname.

== Notable people ==
- Jagath Balasuriya (born 1940), Sri Lankan politician
- Kumari Balasuriya, Sri Lankan politician
- Mahinda Balasuriya (born 1953), Sri Lankan police officer
- Sumith Balasuriya, Sri Lankan army officer
- Tharaka Balasuriya, Sri Lankan politician
- Tissa Balasuriya (1924–2013), Sri Lankan priest and theologian
