= Praveena Bandara =

Chair, Sri Lanka Women's Corps

Praveena Bandara ප්‍රවීනා බණ්ඩාර

Chairperson of the Sri Lanka Army Women's Corps Seva Vanitha Unit
- In office 4 March 2020 – 24 September 2020
- Preceded by: General Shavendra Silva; Mrs. Sajeewa Nelson
- Succeeded by: Mrs. Ramani Dematanpitiya

Personal details
- Born: 1975 (age 50–51) Ratnapura, Sri Lanka
- Spouse: Major General Prasanna Chandrasekera
- Occupation: Director; Fashion Designer
- Profession: Bridal Fashion

Military service
- Unit: Seva Vanitha Unit

Praveena Salani Chandrasekera (née Bandara) was the 18th Chairperson of the Sri Lanka Army Women's Corps Seva Vanitha Unit succeeding Ramani Dematanpitiya. She is married to former Master-General of the Ordnance of the Sri Lanka Army, Major General Prasanna Chandrasekera.

== Early life ==
Born in 1975, Bandara was the older one of the two children in the family, younger brother Indika Bandara is the Director at Fashion Gallery, Shades of Wanamal in Colombo. She studied at a local school in Ratnapura, and later moved to Colombo for her higher education in fashion designing. In 2000, she married Major General Prasanna Chandrasekera and has two children, daughter Nadara and son Sanula.

== Sri Lanka Army Women's Corps - Seva Vanitha Unit ==
Bandara assumed Duties as the 18th Chairperson of the Sri Lanka Army Women's Corps Seva Vanitha Unit on 26 February 2020. During her time as the chairperson, there were several new accomplishments within the organization. Soon after her first general meeting on 16 March a donation was presented to an international award winner Corporal Nishanthi to mark the occasion as an appreciation by Bandara. Later on 19 July 2020 they opened a newly constructed office for the current and upcoming presidents of the Sri Lanka Army Women's Corps Seva Vanitha Unit. Later they handed over a new accommodation building for female officers of the Sri Lanka Army Women's Corps in order to uplift the living standard of for women.

== Current Employment ==
Bandara is a fashion designer and currently working as a director of the fashion gallery Shades of Wanamal.
