= E. G. Thevanayagam =

- Military career
- Allegiance: Sri Lanka
- Branch: Sri Lanka Army
- Rank: Major General
- Unit: Sri Lanka Sinha Regiment
- Commands: Chief of Staff of the Sri Lanka Army, Commandant of the Volunteer Force
- Conflicts: 1971 Insurrection, Sri Lankan Civil War, Insurrection 1987-89
- Awards: Vishista Seva Vibhushanaya
- Other work: Director, National Cadet Corps

Major General E. George Thevanayagam, VSV was a Sri Lankan general, he served as the Chief of Staff of the Sri Lanka Army, Commandant of the Volunteer Force, and later first Director of the National Cadet Corps.

Born and educated in Jaffna, Thevanayagam joined the Ceylon Army, following his training at Royal Military Academy, Sandhurst he was commissioned a Second Lieutenant in the Ceylon Light Infantry. Promoted to Lieutenant, he was appointed Adjutant of the 1 Battalion Ceylon Sinha Regiment. Captain Thevanayagam, married Sanders in Jaffna in 1961. Brigadier Thevanayagam was in charge of arranging the funeral of the officer and troops of the patrol Four Four Bravo who were killed in Jaffna. He retire as a Major General in 1986 after serving as the Commandant of the Volunteer Force and the Chief of Staff of the Sri Lanka Army. After his retirement he was appointed as the first Director of the National Cadet Corps.

Major General Thevanayagam has been awarded the service medals Vishista Seva Vibhushanaya, Ceylon Armed Services Long Service Medal and Sri Lanka Armed Services Long Service Medal.
