= South Asian Institute of Technology and Medicine =

South Asian Educational Institute

- Type: Private
- Established: 2008; 18 years ago
- Affiliations: General Sir John Kotelawala Defence University
- President: Dr. Neville Fernando
- Vice-Chancellor: Prof. Ananda Samarasekara
- Faculty: 194
- Location: Malabe, Sri Lanka
- Campus: Main Campus, 4 acres (Suburban), Malabe
- Colors: Blue, green
- Website: www.saitm.edu.lk

The South Asian Institute of Technology and Medicine (SAITM) (originally known as the South Asian Institute of Technology and Management) is a privately owned educational institution providing higher education in Sri Lanka. It is recognised as a degree awarding institute under section 25A of the Universities Act No. 16 of 1978. In 2018, the parliament of Sri Lanka passed a special provisions act to abolish SAITM Medical faculty and to transfer the students to General Sir John Kotelawala Defence University.

SAITM has become a highly controversial national issue with various segments questioning its standards and legality in terms of its operations as the only private medical school in the country. In July 2016 the government of Sri Lanka suspended the provision for new admissions at the medical faculty of SAITM. In February 2017 the Court of Appeal of Sri Lanka upheld its legality and the validity of the medical degrees awarded by it, instructing the Sri Lanka Medical Council (SLMC) register its graduates as medical doctors. SLMC has since appealed the decision to the Supreme Court, while as of yet the SLMC has not recognized the medical degree of SAITM for the purpose of Registration to Practise Medicine and Surgery in Sri Lanka under the Medical Ordinance. The SAITM medical course is one of only 17 programs worldwide that The General Medical Council of the United Kingdom has noted specifically by name as "medical qualifications (they) do not accept" and is the only Sri Lankan Medical course not accepted by the GMC. In September 2018, the Supreme Court of Sri Lanka upheld the decisions of the Court of Appeal ruling which directed the Sri Lanka Medical Council to register MBBS graduates of the SAITM.

== History ==
The South Asian Institute of Technology and Medicine was established in 2008 by Dr. Neville Fernando with the aim to provide tertiary qualifications in medicine, engineering, and information technology, management and finance, and information communication technology and media. The institute was initially affiliated with the Nizhny Novgorod State Medical Academy (Russia), the Asian Institute of Technology (Thailand) and Buckinghamshire New University (England), awarding degrees through those respective institutes. In 2011 SAITM applied for recognition from the University Grants Commission (UGC) as a degree awarding institution, with the ability to award its own degrees. The UGC, in 2013, granted SAITM a degree awarding status despite protests from the Inter-University Students’ Federation (IUSF) and the Government Medical Officers’ Association (GMOA). SAITM held their first convocation in March 2013, conferring degrees to ten students from the Faculty of ICT and Media and eighteen students from the Faculty of Management and Finance.

In 2017 President Maithripala Sirisena proposed to list SAITM on the stock exchange to as an answer to criticism on its ownerships allowing anyone to buy shares. Sirisena pointed out that over 75,000 to 85,000 Sri Lankan students go overseas annually for higher education which could be reduced if quality private universities exist in Sri Lanka. Health minister Rajitha Senaratne also echoed similar sentiment claiming that proper guidelines will be established to administer SAITM which will also be applicable to future international universities that have expressed willingness to expand into Sri Lanka.

Following a fast unto death campaign performed by the parents of State Medical Students, on 8th Nov 2017, the Government of Sri Lanka, decided to abolish SAITM, suspend the new enrollments immediately and to do a fair inquiry to the students already enrolled in.

Following the appeal put up by SLMC against the high court decision, was worded by the supreme court on 21 September 2018. It contains 55 pages which shows that the Sri Lanka Medical Council (SLMC) purposefully not given the provincial registration for the SAITM graduates. Therefore, Supreme court advice the give the provincial registration for the SAITM graduates from immediate effect without any condition.

== Degree programs ==
In 2011 the Ministry of Higher Education recognized SAITM as a degree awarding institute in terms of Section 25 (A) of the Universities Act No.16 of 1978. As such the UGC has approved SAITM to award the following degrees;

- Bachelor of Medicine and Bachelor of Surgery (MBBS) - (2011)
- Bachelor of Science in Engineering in Mechatronics Engineering - (2016)
- Bachelor of Science in Engineering in Civil Engineering - (2016)

== Controversies ==
=== Medical qualifications ===
==== Sri Lanka ====
In 2016 the Sri Lanka Medical Council (SLMC) and the Government Medical Officers' Association (GMOA) have both publicly stated that they were opposed the provisional registration of medical graduates from SAITM to practice as doctors in Sri Lanka. But it was later over ruled by the court of appeal and it was informed that the graduates of SAITM can register with Sri Lanka Medical Council. Recently parents and students of the SAITM requested to postpone the final examinations as they have had no or minimal formal clinical training. In 2017 Russian Ambassador Alexander Karchava also spoke up for SAITM and revealed that Nizhni Novgorod State Medical Academy has continuously expressed satisfaction with the training of Sri Lankan students and honors the ties with SAITM. According to him over 54 Russian doctors and professors worked in SAITM on a shift basis ensuring that SAITM students gain quality medical education. However Nizny Novgorod medical academy denies having any connections or affiliations with SAITM. According to Irina Tatarinova, Director National Accreditation Agency Russia, SAITM is not accredited in Russia: "The National Accreditation Agency maintains the Database of accredited Higher Education Institutions in the Russian Federation. This Database does not contain any information about Sri Lankan Campus of Nizhny Novgorod State Medical Academy. This means that this joint program is not accredited in Russia."

==== United Kingdom ====
In the United Kingdom, the General Medical Council has listed SAITM as an institution whose graduates from the South Asian Institute of Technology and Medicine are ineligible for licensure. Issuing a statement titled "Overseas medical qualifications not accepted by the GMC", it said that the body would not accept applications to sit the PLAB test or for registration from graduates of the medical schools mentioned in it including the SAITM.

=== Wasim Tajudeen murder case ===
On 3 October 2016, the Criminal Investigation Department of Sri Lanka confiscated 26 human body parts from the institute's laboratory during a search operation carried out to locate the missing body parts of suspected murder victim Wasim Tajudeen.

=== Staff Controversies ===
==== Sameera Senaratne ====
In early February 2017, two men travelling on a motor bike wearing full-face helmets opened fire at the car of SAITM's Director of Medical Education Sameera Senaratne who was at the wheel at the time of the incident, at Malabe. He did not suffer any injuries despite the attackers allegedly shooting at him at close range. Subsequent inquiries raised suspicion that the shooting was staged by Senaratne and a politician known to him, to depict the anti-SAITM protests brewing in the country at the time in an unfavourable light. A later Police investigation pointed to the shooting could have been staged by Senaratne himself

==== Nandalal Gunaratne ====
Nandalal Gunaratne is listed as a 'Consultant Urologist' and 'Senior Lecturer in Surgery', and as the 'Head of Clinical Sciences at SAITM'. Gunaratne has been barred from the practice of surgery in Australia, following investigation into his competence in 'the most basic of operations' as reported in the Australian press

==== Ananda Samarasekara ====
Ananda Samarasekara is SAITM's Professor and Head of the Department of Forensic Medicine. Samarasekara had an arrest warrant issued by the CID in October 2017 on charges of concealing evidence and misplacement of body parts in the alleged murder of Wasim Thajudeen. He surrendered to the Colombo Magistrates Court in October 2017 and has been granted bail
