= Army School of Logistics =

Army School of Logistics is located at Clappenburg, Trincomalee, Sri Lanka. Established on 9 May 2011, to provide academic and training programs in logistics science and management science for both Commissioned Officer and Non Commissioned Officers.

== Courses ==
- Logistics Staff Course (LSC) - Accredited to the General Sir John Kotelawala Defence University for the Master of Business Administration in Logistics Management.
- Junior Officers' Logistics Course
- Quartermaster Commission Courses (carried out in conjunction with Volunteer Force Training School)
- Senior Non Commissioned Officers' Logistics Course

== See also ==
- Defence Services Command and Staff College
- Officer Career Development Centre
- Army Logistics University
