= Volunteer Force Training School =

- Active: 1988-Present
- Country: Sri Lanka
- Branch: Sri Lanka Army
- Type: Training
- Role: Volunteer Force Training
- Part of: Army Training Command
- Garrison/HQ: Diyatalawa

The Volunteer Force Training School Diyatalawa (VFTS Diyatalawa) is the primary training facility for the Sri Lanka Army Volunteer Force. Traditionally, training of the Ceylon Defence Force took place at Diyatalawa Garrison with the annual training camp becoming a regular fixture. This practice continued after the formation of the Ceylon Army in 1949, with the CDF camp been renamed as the Volunteer Force Training Centre and tasked with the training of personal of the Ceylon Volunteer Force and Ceylon Cadet Corps. In 1988, with the re-designation of the National Cadet Corps, the Volunteer Force Training Centre was restructured Volunteer Force Training School with its own Commandant.

== Courses ==
=== Officer courses ===
- Commissioning courses
  - Direct enlisted officers' course (Direct Entry Stream to the Volunteer Force for professionals such as Doctors, IT specialists, Civil Engineers, Accountants etc.)
  - National Cadet Corps officers' course (Probationary officers for the National Cadet Corps)
  - Retired warrant officers commissioning course
  - Other ranks commissioning course
  - Quartermaster Commission Courses (carried out in conjunction with Army School of Logistics)
- Senior officers course (volunteer)
- Second in command course
- Junior staff officer course
- Junior command course
- Functional English course

=== Other ranks courses ===
- Promotion course for corporal to sergeant
- Leadership development course for senior NCOs
- Junior instructor course
- Junior leadership development course

== Notable alumni ==
- Karu Jayasuriya - Former Speaker of Parliament and Minister
- Nissanka Wijeyeratne — Former Minister
- Ravi Jayewardene - Former National Security Adviser

== See also ==
- Sri Lanka Military Academy
- Mons Officer Cadet School
