= Kuruwita Army Camp =

Military barracks in Kuruwita, Sri Lanka

- Kuruwita, Sabaragamuwa Province

Site information
- Type: Military Base

Site history
- In use: 20th century – present

Garrison information
- Garrison: Gemunu Watch

Kuruwitha Army Camp is a military barracks located in Kuruwita close to the town of Ratnapura in the Sabaragamuwa Province of Sri Lanka. It serves as the regimental headquarters of the Gemunu Watch of Sri Lanka Army.

== See also ==
- Gemunu Watch
