= HMS Uva =

HMS Uva was a Royal Navy rest camp at Diyatalawa, in British Ceylon.

== History ==
The camp was reportedly built as a prisoner of war camp for use in the Boer War in 1900, and was used as a Royal Naval Auxiliary Hospital in the Second World War. The rest camp was commissioned as an independent command under the name Uva on 1 December 1945.

The camp's accounts were transferred to HMS Lanka in 1957, and the camp was transferred to the Air Ministry on 30 September 1958.

== Nominal depot ships ==
Uva had several nominal depot ships during her career:

Type	Number	Dates active
SPL	431224	1 December 1945 – August 1950
Harbour Launch, Petrol	441614	August 1950 – ?
Harbour Launch, Petrol	431224	1954
Harbour Launch, Diesel	441614	1955 – March 1957
Motor Launch	4749	March 1957 – ?

== See also ==
- Diyatalawa Garrison
