= 111 Brigade (Sri Lanka) =

- Active: 1972 – present
- Country: Sri Lanka
- Branch: Sri Lanka Army
- Role: Air assault
- Garrison/HQ: Kandy
- Engagements: Sri Lankan Civil War, 1987–1989 JVP insurrection

Commanders
- Current commander: Brigadier W.G.H.A.S Bandara

The 111 Brigade is a formation of the Sri Lanka Army. The Brigade is responsible for the defense of the City of Kandy and the central province at large. It was formerly known as the Area Headquarters Kandy and was renamed in 2011 coming under the 11th Division.

It traces its roots to the Central Commander's Headquarters which was established in 1972 following the 1971 Insurrection under the command of Colonel E.J Divitotawela. In 1988, it was renamed as the 12 Division followed with another re-designation in 32 Division until it became known as the Area Headquarters on 23 October 1996.

== Current formation ==
- 1st Battalion, Sri Lanka Rifle Corps
- 2nd Battalion, Sri Lanka Rifle Corps

== See also ==
- 11th Division
