= Lewella =

- Village
- Location within Sri Lanka
- Coordinates: 7°18′N 80°39′E
- Country: Sri Lanka
- Province: Central Province
- District: Kandy District
- Time zone: UTC+5:30 (Sri Lanka Standard Time)

Lewella (meaning "blood sand") is a village and northeastern suburb of Kandy, in Central Province, Sri Lanka. It contains the Buddhist Lewella Meditation Centre, as well as a center for the Jesuits. The Mahaweli River flows on the eastern side, with a small bridge along Sirimalwatta Road, known as Lewella Suspension Bridge, leading across the river to the east.

Lewella can also be seen spelled as "Le Wella," meaning "bloody beach" due to a massacre in the area from the first major British invasion in the 1800s.

Degaldoruwa temple is a historic Buddhist temple well known for cave paintings situated near Lewella.

== See also ==
- List of towns in Central Province, Sri Lanka
