= Master-General of the Ordnance (Sri Lanka) =

Master-General of the Ordnance is a senior position in the General Staff of the Sri Lanka Army, the post is a head by a senior officer of the Major General rank. The Master-General of the Ordnance's Branch is responsible for procurement and maintenance of vehicles and special equipment of the Sri Lanka Army.

Coming under the preview of the Master-General of the Ordnance's Branch is the following Directorates;

- Directorate of Ordnance Services
- Directorate of Ordnance Procurement Services

== Past Masters-General of the Ordnance ==
- Major General G.L. Sigera
- Major General Asoka Thoradeniya
- Major General Kamal Gunaratne
- Major General Dhammika Liyanage
- Major General Jagath Gunawardena
- Major General Prasanna Chandrasekera

== References & External links ==
- Arms and men
