= 11 Division (Sri Lanka) =

11 Infantry Division
- Active: 1988 - Present
- Country: Sri Lanka
- Branch: Sri Lankan Army
- Type: Division (military)
- Role: Training and Administration; Defense of the city of Kandy; Military Aid to the Civil Power
- Part of: Security Forces Headquarters - Central
- Garrison/HQ: Pallekele
- Engagements: Sri Lankan Civil War

The 11 Infantry Division is a division of the Sri Lanka Army. Based at the Pallekele, it is responsible for the maintenance of capability for the defence of Kandy. It is also responsible for carrying out training and administrative work. It was established April 4, 1988, as 1st Division at the Panagoda Cantonment and was remanded the 11 Division in 1997.

== Current formation ==
- 111 Brigade, Kandy
- 112 Brigade
- 113 Brigade
