= Sumith Balasuriya =

Sri Lanka Army general

- Military career
- Branch: Sri Lanka Army
- Service years: 1974–2009
- Rank: Major General
- Unit: Sri Lanka Artillery
- Commands: Sri Lanka Army Volunteer Force, General Sir John Kotelawala Defence University, 23 Division
- Conflicts: Sri Lankan Civil War, Insurrection 1987-89
- Awards: Vishista Seva Vibhushanaya, Uttama Seva Padakkama
- Other work: Director General - Ministry of Foreign Affairs

Major General Sumith Balasuriya, VSV, USP is a retired Sri Lankan army general, who was the former Commandant of the Volunteer Force; Vice Chancellor, General Sir John Kotelawala Defence University and GOC, 23 Division.

Educated at Royal College, Colombo, Balasuriya joined the army in 1974 after completing basic training at the Army Training Centre, Diyatalawa, he was commissioned in to the Sri Lanka Artillery in 1975 as a Second Lieutenant. Having served as an Instructor Gunnery, he went to become the Colonel-Commandant, Sri Lanka Artillery in 2009.

Having completed staff college and graduated of the National Defence College, India, he held several senior command and staff appointments in the army, including General Officer Commanding, 23 Division; Director General Financial Management, Army Headquarters; Military Co-ordinating Officer, Trincomalee. Becoming the Vice Chancellor Commandant of the General Sir John Kotelawala Defence University, he was tipped to become the Deputy Chief of Staff of the Sri Lanka Army. However he was appointed as Commandant of the Sri Lanka Army Volunteer Force.

He retired from the army in 2010.

He was awarded the Vishista Seva Vibhushanaya (VSV), Uttama Seva Padakkama (USP), the Sri Lanka Armed Services Long Service Medal, the Riviresa Campaign Services Medal, the Purna Bhumi Padakkama and the North and East Operations Medal.

Military offices
Preceded by Lawrence Fernando	Commandant of the Volunteer Force; 2007 - 2010	Succeeded by J. J. P. S. T. Liyanage
