= 52 Division (Sri Lanka) =

- Active: 24 August 1995 – present
- Country: Sri Lanka
- Branch: Sri Lanka Army
- Part of: Security Forces Headquarters – Jaffna
- Garrison/HQ: Mirusuvil, Northern Province

The 52 Division is a division of the Sri Lanka Army. Established on 24 August 1995, the division is currently based in Mirusuvil in the Northern Province. The division is a part of Security Forces Headquarters – Jaffna.
