= 56 Division (Sri Lanka) =

- 56 වන සේනාංකය
- 56 Division crest
- Active: 17 October 1997 – present
- Country: Sri Lanka
- Branch: Sri Lanka Army
- Size: 20,528
- Part of: Security Forces Headquarters – Wanni
- Garrison/HQ: Kokeliya, Northern Province
- Website: 56 Division

Commanders
- Current commander: Maj Gen KND Karunapala

The 56 Division is a division of the Sri Lanka Army. Established on 17 October 1997, the division is currently based in Kokeliya in the Northern Province. The division is a part of Security Forces Headquarters – Wanni and has two brigades and six battalions. Major General KND Karunapala has been commander of the division since 2 December 2012. The division is responsible for 830 square kilometres (320 sq mi) of territory.

== Organisation ==
56 Division flag

The division is currently organised as follows:

- 561 Brigade
  - 16th Battalion, Sri Lanka Sinha Regiment
  - 19th Volunteer Battalion, Gajaba Regiment (based in Kanakarayankulam, Northern Province)
  - 17th Volunteer Battalion, Vijayabahu Infantry Regiment
- 562 Brigade
  - 21st Battalion, Sri Lanka Sinha Regiment
  - 11th Battalion, Sri Lanka National Guard
