= SLAF Diyatalawa =

Coordinates: 6.81471°N 80.95582°E

- Diyatalawa, Uva Province

Site information
- Type: SLAF Station
- Controlled by: Sri Lanka Air Force

Site history
- In use: 15 October 1952 – present

SLAF Diyatalawa is the Sri Lanka Air Force station in Diyatalawa. It is the primary ground combat training centre for SLAF Regiment and other trades. It runs basic combat courses for officer cadets and recruits as well as Advanced training for SLAF Regiment officer cadets. Gunner instructor technique course, drill instructor technique course and physical training instructor course are carried out here.

== History ==
Following the formation of the Royal Ceylon Air Force (RCyAF) on 2 March 1951, the RCyAF established a training camp, the Stable Hill Camp, in the garrison town of Diyatalawa on 15 October 1952, so named because it had once housed the stables for the original British military camp there. The inaugural chief instructor/commanding officer was Flight Lieutenant J. V. P Howard (RAF). The first Officer Cadet Course was commenced on 19 February 1953.

In 1953 the McRobert Camp building was taken over by the RCyAF from the RAF and made the Officers' Mess. In 1971 the building was handed over to the Ministry of Health and is now the Base Hospital, Diyatalawa.

On 15 March 1971, RCyAF Diyatalawa was renamed RCyAF Ground Combat and Recruit Training Unit, Diyatalawa. In 1972 the establishment was renamed the SLAF Ground Combat Training Unit, Diyatalawa.
