= Gamini Samaranayake =

Sri Lankan diplomat

Gamini S. V. D. Samaranayake was born in Anuradhapura, Sri Lanka. In September 2014, he was appointed as the Sri Lankan ambassador to the Philippines. He also worked as a chairman in the University Grants Commission - Sri Lanka.

== Education ==
Samaranayake completed his B.A (Hons.) degree in political sciences from the University of Peradeniya, Sri Lanka, from 1973–1976. He completed his M.A. in political sciences from the same institute, i.e. University of Peradeniya, Sri Lanka from 1981–1983. In 1986, he got an admission in the PhD degree at the department of international relations, in the University of St. Andrews, Scotland, United Kingdom, and completed the PhD degree with the title as "Political Violence in the third World: A Case Study of Sri Lanka, 1971–1987," in 1991.

== Career ==
As an academic, Samaranayake rose from assistant lecturer in 1977 to senior professor and chair of the Department of Political Science, at the University of Peredeniya. He also held administrative positions as vice chancellor of the University of Rajarata and has participated in numerous international conferences, workshops, and fellowship programs. Samaranayake then started working as the chairman in the University Grants Commission - Sri Lanka. Afterwards, he started his duties as an Ambassador of Manila. He is also a Representative to the senate from the faculty of arts, University of Peradeniya and a Member of the Sri Lanka National Commission for UNESCO. Previously, he was the vice-president of the American Studies Association of Sri Lanka

== Publications ==
1. Samaranayake has published his PhD thesis in form of book with the titled as "Political Violence in Sri Lanka, 1971-1987", and this book is published by New Delhi: Gyan Publishing House, in 2008.
2. Gamini Samaranayake, "Patterns of political violence and responses of the government in Sri Lanka, 1971–1996," Journal of Terrorism and Political Violence Volume 11, Issue - 1, 1999.
3. Gamini Samaranayake, "Political Terrorism of the Liberation Tigers of Tamil Eelam (LTTE) in Sri Lanka," South Asia: Journal of South Asian Studies, Volume 30, Issue 1, 2007
4. Gamini Samaranayake, “Ethnic Conflict and Guerrilla Warfare of the Liberation Tigers of Tamil Eelam in Sri Lanka.” In Ethnicity and Polity in South Asia, edited by Girin Phukon, New Delhi: South Asian Publishers, 2002
