= 65 Division (Sri Lanka) =

- 65 Division flag
- Active: 2008 – present
- Country: Sri Lanka
- Branch: Sri Lanka Army
- Type: division
- Part of: Security Forces Headquarters – Wanni

Commanders
- Current commander: Major General K A Samarasiri

The 65 Division is a division of the Sri Lanka Army. Established on 15 Dec 2008, the division was based in Alankulam near Thunukkai in the Northern Province. Today the division is a part of Security Forces Headquarters – Wanni and has three brigades and eight battalions.

== Organisation ==
The division has following sub units:

- 651 Brigade (based in Pooneryn, Northern Province)
  - 19th Battalion, Sri Lanka Light Infantry
  - 11th Volunteer Battalion, Gajaba Regiment (based in Mulankavil, Northern Province)
- 652 Brigade (based in Anaivilunthankulam, Northern Province)
  - 20th Volunteer Battalion, Vijayabahu Infantry Regiment
  - 7th Battalion, Sri Lanka National Guard
- 653 Brigade (based in Alankulam, Northern Province)
  - 10th Battalion, Sri Lanka Light Infantry
  - 21st Volunteer Battalion, Sri Lanka Light Infantry
