= General Sir John Kotelawala Defence University =

Joint services academy in Colombo, Sri Lanka

- ජෙනරාල් ශ්‍රීමත් ජෝන් කොතලාවල ආරක්ෂක විශ්ව විද්‍යාලය
- Crest of the General Sir John Kotelawala Defence University
- Other name: KDU
- Former name: General Sir John Kotelawala Defence Academy
- Motto: සිය රටටමයි කවදත් ("For The Motherland Forever")
- Type: Military university
- Established: 11 October 1980; 45 years ago
- Affiliations: South Asian Institute of Technology and Medicine, Association of Commonwealth Universities
- Chancellor: General SHS Kottegoda (Retd) WWV RWP RSP VSV
- Vice-Chancellor: Rear Admiral Dammika Kumara(VSV USP PSC MMP)
- Undergraduates: 2500
- Postgraduates: 50
- Location: Ratmalana, Colombo, Sri Lanka; 6.8177°N 79.8903°E
- Website: www.kdu.ac.lk
- Location within Sri Lanka

General Sir John Kotelawala Defence University (KDU) (Sinhala: ජෙනරාල් ශ්‍රිමත් ජෝන් කොතලාවල ආරක්ෂක විශ්ව විද්‍යාලය General Sir John Kotelawala Arakshaka Vishva Vidyalaya) located at Kandawala, Ratmalana, Colombo, is the state defense university of Sri Lanka which is administered by the Ministry of Defense.

The General Sir John Kotelawala Defence Academy was established in 1980 by the Sir John Kotelawala Defence Academy Act, No. 68 of 1981 as the joint defence service training institute of the Sri Lankan Armed Forces, where cadets of the three services, Sri Lanka Army, Sri Lanka Navy and Sri Lanka Air Force undergo academic training together before they go on to respective service academy for further pre-commission training. It was named after General Sir John Kotelawala, third Prime Minister of Ceylon who donated his home for the academy. It was made a university by an amendment bill passed in Parliament on 11 October 2007 which enabled both military and civilian students to be admitted.

== History ==
The General Sir John Kotelawala Defence Academy (the Defence University of Sri Lanka) was inaugurated on 11 October 1980 on a 48-acre (190,000 m^{2}) estate donated by the late General Sir John Kotelawala, CH, KBE, LLD, a former Prime Minister of Ceylon. The KDU functions under the motto For The Motherland Forever, a dictum followed by General Sir John Kotelawala himself.

The KDA was instituted with the objective of educating males and females to be commissioned officers in the armed forces of Sri Lanka. It has been legally established under the Sir John Kotelawala Defence Academy Act No. 68 of 1981 and is governed by a Board of Management consisting of the Secretary of the Defence as the chairman, Commanders of the tri-services, representatives of the University Grant Commission and the General Treasury, and the Commandant of the academy as members.

From 1980 to 1986, Service Officer Cadets temporarily studied engineering and physical science at the University of Colombo and University of Moratuwa, and they were awarded the degree by the same universities. In 1988, KDA was elevated to university status subsequent to proposal made to the then government headed by the President J.R. Jayewardene, thus enabling KDA to offer degrees in Defence Studies.

An amendment bill was passed in Parliament on 18 March 2007 granting the status of a national university to the KDA. On 11 October 2007 KDA was renamed as the General Sir John Kotelawala Defence University.

KDU opened its southern campus at Sooriyawewa, Sri Lanka on 5 May 2015.

The opening of the University Hospital of General Sir John Kotelawala Defense University was held on 21 May 2017. KDU become first university in Sri Lanka, running its own University Hospital with modern facilities. The university hospital provide medical services to general public and service personnel free of charge.

In 2018, parliament of Sri Lanka passed the General Sir John Kotelawala Defence University (Special Provisions) Act to abolish medical faculty of South Asian Institute of Technology and Medicine and to transfer the students to General Sir John Kotelawala Defence University. It is a member of the Association of Commonwealth Universities.

In June 2021, the State Minister of Internal Security, Home Affairs and Disaster Management presented the Sir John Kotelawala National Defence University Bill (Special Provisions), proposing legislative changes to the governing structure of the KDU. Controversially, the proposed Bill placed KDU management under the Defence Ministry, with a senior officer of the armed services serving as the president or vice-chancellor, rather than under the Ministry of Higher Education, as is the norm. This bill has been challenged by several groups including scholars and university students that have claimed the move could lead to privatization and militarization of the higher education in Sri Lanka. It has been claimed that the bill would allow the KDU to continue function independent of the University Grants Commission and it will excludes the KDU from the purview of the UGC per its funding Sir John Kotelawala Defence Academy Act, No. 68 of 1981. These groups further claim that any university that intends to offer civil education should not function without UGC control and quality assurance. For example, Article 15 2 (1) of the Bill explicitly specifies that the KDU is formed outside of the jurisdiction of the UGC Act No. 16 of 1978. As a result, unlike other state universities and higher education institutes in Sri Lanka that are governed by the UGC, KDU has the authority to regulate itself. In actuality, the KDU statute legalizes a full parallel military administration structure for civil higher education purposes with autonomy.

== Academic wing ==
The KDU is the only public university in Sri Lanka offering Bachelor of Science in Degrees in Marine Engineering and Aeronautical Engineering.

The degree courses at the KDU run for two to five years. The officer cadets follow a course of study from the fields of medicine, law, engineering, management and technical sciences, commerce or arts. At the end of the second year, the officer cadets (other than the Engineering cadets and who stay to complete their third-year studies) are sent to their military academies (Sri Lanka Military Academy, Diyatalawa; Naval and Maritime Academy, Trincomalee; Air Force Academy, SLAF China Bay).

Since 2010 the university was opened for non-military students under a payment scheme. These students are allowed to enjoy the academic and other facilities that were available for cadets before. They have to wear a uniform when in attendance. Scholarships are awarded for children from Ranaviru (Veterans) families and police.

Academic work is conducted under the direction of the Board of Studies and Board of Management by the Director of Academic Studies. There are eight academic departments. Each department consist of a Head of the department, internal/visiting staff, and the library.

== Faculties ==
- Faculty of Defence Studies and Strategic Studies
- Faculty of Engineering
  - Bachelor of Science (Hons) in Aeronautical Engineering
  - Bachelor of Science (Hons) in Aircraft Maintenance Engineering
  - Bachelor of Science (Hons) in Biomedical Engineering
  - Bachelor of Science (Hons) in Civil Engineering
  - Bachelor of Science (Hons) in Electrical & Electronic Engineering
  - Bachelor of Science (Hons) in Electronics & Telecommunication Engineering
  - Bachelor of Science (Hons) in Marine Engineering
  - Bachelor of Science (Hons) in Mechanical Engineering
  - Bachelor of Science (Hons) in Mechatronic Engineering
- Faculty of Graduate Studies
  - PhD/MPhil
  - Master of Science (Defence Studies) in Management
  - Master of Science in Information Technology
  - Master of Business Administration in Logistics Management
  - Master of Business Administration in E-governance
- Faculty of Law
  - Bachelor of Laws
- Faculty of Management, Social Sciences and Humanities
  - Bachelor of Science in Logistics Management
  - Bachelor of Science in Management and Technical Sciences
  - Bachelor of Science in Social Sciences
- Faculty of Medicine
  - Bachelor of Medicine, Bachelor of Surgery
- Faculty of Allied Health Sciences
  - Bachelor of Science (Hons) in Physiotherapy
  - Bachelor of Science (Hons) in Nursing
  - Bachelor of Science (Hons) in Radiography
  - Bachelor of Science (Hons) in Radiotherapy
  - Bachelor of Science (Hons) in Medical Laboratory Sciences
  - Bachelor of Pharmacy
- Faculty of Computing
  - Bachelor of Science (Hons) in Computer Engineering
  - Bachelor of Science (Hons) in Computer Science
  - Bachelor of Science (Hons) in Software Engineering
  - Bachelor of Science (Hons) in Information Technology
  - Bachelor of Science (Hons) in Information Systems
  - Bachelor of Science (Hons) in Data Science and Business Analytics.
- Faculty of Built Environment and Spatial Sciences
  - Bachelor of Architecture
  - Bachelor of Science (Hons) in Built Environment
  - Bachelor of Science in Built Environment
  - Bachelor of Science (Hons) in Quantity Surveying
  - Bachelor of Science in Spatial Science
  - Bachelor of Science (Hons) in Spatial Science
- Faculty of Technology
  - Bachelor of engineering technology honors construction technology
  - Bachelor of engineering technology honors building service technology
  - Bachelor of engineering technology honors bio medical technology
  - Bachelor of technology honors information and communication technology

== Accredited institutions ==
Following institutions have been accredited to the KDU to conduct academic programs;

- National Defence College, Sri Lanka - Master of Science, for the successful participants of the National Defence and Strategic Study Course (ndc).
- Defence Services Command and Staff College - Master of Science in Defence and Strategic Studies, for the successful participants of the Defence Services Command and Staff Course (psc).
- Army School of Logistics - Master of Business Administration in Logistics Management, for the successful participants of the Logistics Staff Course (LSC).
- Naval and Maritime Academy - Master of Business Administration in Logistics Management, for the successful participants of the Long Logistics Management Course (LLMC).
- Naval and Maritime Academy - Post Graduate Diploma in Defence Management, for the successful participants of the Junior Naval Staff Course.
- Sri Lanka Air Force Junior Command & Staff College - Post Graduate Diploma in Defence Management, for the successful participants of the Junior Command and Staff Course.
- Sri Lanka Military Academy - Bachelor of Science in Military Studies, for the successful participants of the Regular Long Course (Commissioning Course).

== Commandants and vice chancellors ==
KDA was renamed as KDU in year 2007 and until such time chief executive officer was the Commandant. However, in 2007 after renaming as Kotelawala Defence University, Vice Chancellor is the Chief Executive of the university.

List of commandants and vice chancellors are as follows:

No	Commandant	Took office	Left office
1	Brigadier CAMN Silva	15 January 1981	30 June 1982
2	Brigadier YRMP Wijekoon	1 July 1982	30 September 1983
3	Brigadier GD Fernando	1 October 1983	31 December 1983
4	Commander ML Mendis	1 January 1984	30 September 1996
5	Air Commodore PM Fernando	1 October 1986	28 February 1991
6	Brigadier AMU Senevirathna	25 April 1991	31 December 1992
7	Brigadier UA Karunaratne	27 June 1993	8 February 1994
8	Air Vice Marshal U Wanasinghe	8 February 1994	7 May 1996
9	Commodore EMK Fernando	7 July 1996	1 December 1998
10	Brigadier G Hettiarachchi	1 December 1998	4 December 1999
11	Major General N Mallawarachchi	4 December 1999	18 November 2000
12	Air Vice Marshal GY de Silva	14 January 2001	15 January 2004
13	Rear Admiral CN Thuduwewatte	16 January 2004	2 February 2007
14	Major General Sumith Balasuriya, USP, ndc, IG, SLA	5 February 2007	10 October 2007

No	Vice Chancellor	Took office	Left office
1	Major General Sumith Balasuriya, USP, ndc, IG, SLA	11 October 2007	27 December 2008
2	Major General Milinda Peiris RWP RSP VSV USP LOM ndc psc	28 December 2008	
3	Rear Admiral Nandana Thuduwewatte		
4	Commodore M. L. Mendis		
5	Air Vice Marshal Sagara Kotakadeniya		
6	Major General Milinda Peiris RWP RSP VSV USP LOM ndc psc		1 September 2023
7	Rear Admiral HGU Dammika Kumara VSV USP psc MMaritimePol, BSc (DS)	1 September 2023	

== Notable alumni ==
- Yohani de Silva - Singer
- Admiral Priyantha Perera - 25th Commander of the Sri Lanka Navy
- Air Marshal Udeni Rajapaksha - 19th Commander of the Sri Lanka Air Force
- Rear Admiral HGU Dammika Kumara - 5th Vice Chancellor of General Sir John Kotelawala Defense University

== See also ==
- Education in Sri Lanka
- Military of Sri Lanka
- South Asian Institute of Technology and Medicine
- Sri Lankan universities
