= Diyatalawa =

- Town
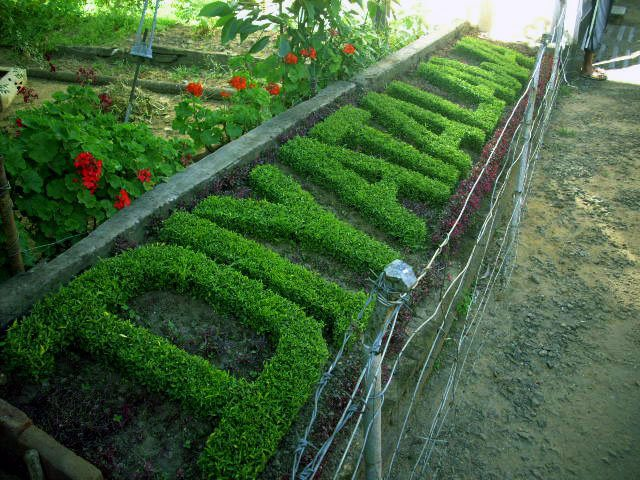

- Location within Sri Lanka
- Coordinates: 6°48′41″N 80°57′25″E
- Country: Sri Lanka
- Province: Uva Province
- District: Badulla District
- Elevation: 1,250 m (4,100 ft)
- Time zone: UTC+5:30 (Sri Lanka Standard Time)

Diyatalawa (දියතලාව; தியதலாவ; literally “the watered plain”) is a town and former garrison settlement in the central highlands of Sri Lanka, in Badulla District of Uva Province. The town is associated with long-standing military training establishments, including the Sri Lanka Military Academy and the Sri Lanka Air Force Combat Training School at Diyatalawa.

== History ==
=== British period and the Boer War camp ===
Available published accounts record that the British selected Diyatalawa as a military training and garrison area in the late 19th century (commonly dated to around 1885). During the Second Boer War, a prisoner camp was established at Diyatalawa by the British authorities on 8 August 1900 to hold Boer prisoners captured in South Africa.

=== World Wars ===
During the First World War, the Diyatalawa military area was used for the internment of “enemy aliens”, including German nationals in British territories.

In the Second World War, Diyatalawa again functioned as an internment site in Ceylon before internees were transferred to internment camps in India (including Dehradun), with later wartime camp organisation in India described as divided by political affiliation (for example, pro- and anti-National Socialist sections among Germans).

=== Post-independence military establishments ===
After independence, several Sri Lankan service training and operational facilities were established or continued at Diyatalawa. The Sri Lanka Air Force Combat Training School at Diyatalawa traces its establishment to 15 October 1952 at “Stable Hill”, and functions as a primary ground combat training centre for the SLAF Regiment and other ranks.

The Sri Lanka Navy also traces early naval training to Diyatalawa: a Recruit Training Centre was established in 1951 at HMCyS Rangalla (Diyatalawa), before the training centre was later transferred away from Diyatalawa in 1963.

== Sport ==
Diyatalawa is associated with the Fox Hill Supercross motor racing event. The Sri Lanka Military Academy states that the Fox Hill Supercross track is built and maintained by the Academy and is located adjacent to Fox Hill. Sri Lanka Army reporting also describes the event as a fund-raising project linked to the Military Academy’s infrastructure and training facilities.

== Climate ==
National climate summaries published by the Government of Sri Lanka describe temperature decreasing with elevation and cite Diyatalawa (about 1,250 m above mean sea level) with a mean annual temperature of about 20.2 °C.

== See also ==
- Sri Lanka Military Academy
- SLAF Diyatalawa
- Badulla District
