= Jayaweera =

Jayaweera or Jayavira (Sinhala: ජයවීර, romanized: Jayavīra) is both a Sinhalese given name and a surname. Notable people with the name include:

== Given name ==
- Jayavira Bandara, King of Kandy (1511–1551)
- Jayaweera Bandara (born 1970), Sri Lankan cricketer
- Jayaweera Kuruppu (1908–1962), Ceylonese politician

== Surname ==
- Dilith Jayaweera (born 1967), Sri Lankan businessman, entrepreneur, media mogul, lawyer and politician
- Kosala Jayaweera (1987–2025), Sri Lankan politician
- Lalith Jayaweera, Sri Lankan military physician
- M. A. Jayaweera, Sri Lankan former army officer
- Neville Jayaweera (1930–2020), Sri Lankan civil servant and administrator
- Nishantha Jayaweera (born 1969), Sri Lankan politician
- Rajeewa Jayaweera (died 2020), Sri Lankan journalist and airline executive, nephew of Neville Jayaweera
- Siripala Jayaweera, Sri Lankan provincial governor

== See also ==
- 16172 Jayaweera, a minor planet
