= J. G. Balthazar =

Sri Lankan soldier

- Military career
- Allegiance: Sri Lanka
- Branch: Sri Lanka Army
- Service years: 1951-1973; 1981-1984
- Rank: Brigadier
- Unit: Gemunu Watch
- Commands: Chief of Staff of the Army, Commander, Security Forces Jaffna, 1st Battalion, Gemunu Watch
- Conflicts: 1971 Insurrection; Sri Lankan Civil War

Brigadier Jerome Gautier "Lyle" Balthazar was a senior Sri Lanka Army officer who served as Commander, Security Forces Jaffna and Chief of Staff of the Army.

== Early life and education ==
Born in the east coast town of Batticalo, Balthazar was educated at St. Michael's College, Batticalo.

== Military career ==
Balthazar joined the newly formed Ceylon Army, received his basic officer training at the Royal Military Academy, Sandhurst. He was commissioned as a Second Lieutenant and posted to the Ceylon Light Infantry. In 1961, Captain Balthazar lead the second Ceylon Army peace keeping contingent to the United Nations Operation in the Congo. In May 1962, Captain Balthazar along with Captain T. I. Weeratunga were transferred to the newly formed Gemunu Watch and served as the adjutant of the 1st Battalion. From 1969 to 1970, Major Balthazar served as an Extra ADC to William Gopallawa, Governor-General of Ceylon. Major Balthazar served with the Gemunu Watch in the 1971 Insurrection and in January 1973 was appointed commanding officer of the 1st Battalion, Gemunu Watch having been promoted to the rank of lieutenant colonel. He was an active athlete, competing in Putt Shot, Discus Throw and Javelin at regimental, Defence Services and National Champions.

Following a military court of inquiry appointed by Commander of the Army Major General Sepala Attygalle into a complaint against Lieutenant Colonel Balthazar by Major A. Hulangamuwa, he was asked to retire by the William Gopallawa, President of Sri Lanka which he did in August 1973. Balthazar won defamation in the District Court against the complaint, but the judgement was overturned later in the appeal court in 1984 and confirmed in the supreme court in 1985.

He was reinstated with the rank of colonel and served as the principal staff officer to Brigadier T. I. Weeratunga as he returned to Jaffna in June 1981 as Commander, Security Forces - Jaffna to subdue the Tamil militant groups operating there. In 1983, Balthazar took over as Commander, Security Forces - Jaffna with the rank of Brigadier. As Commander, Security Forces - Jaffna, he had the Army's Task Force 4 Northern and all armed forces units in the province under his command. He initiated military operations to subdue to Tamil militancy taking form in Jaffna in 1983. He was successful in killing Tamil militant leader Charles Lucas Anthony aka Seelan on 15 July 1983. He attempted to raid Tamil militant leader Sellakili's hideout on 24 July 1983. However, Sellakili ambushed one of Balthazar's routine patrols Four Four Bravo killing thirteen soldiers. This incident sparked the Black July riots and is considered to be the start of the Sri Lankan Civil War. He was succeeded by Brigadier Nalin Seneviratne. He served as Chief of Staff of the Army under General Seneviratne during the Vadamarachchi Operation.

Brigadier Balthazar had received the Ceylon Armed Services Long Service Medal, the Republic of Sri Lanka Armed Services Medal, the Purna Bhumi Padakkama and the United Nations Medal for service in the ONUC.

== Family ==
He married Kamala Antoinette Maisie "Claudia" Perera.

== See also ==
- Sri Lankan Civil War
