= Tissa Weeratunga =

Sri Lanka Army general and diplomat (1930–2003)

General Tissa Indraka Weeratunga තිස්ස වීරතු০ග VSV
- Born: August 29, 1930; Matara, Ceylon
- Died: November 2003 (aged 73); Colombo, Sri Lanka
- Military career
- Allegiance: Sri Lanka
- Branch: Sri Lanka Army
- Service years: 1951–1985
- Rank: General
- Nickname: Bull
- Units: Ceylon Light Infantry, Gemunu Watch
- Commands: General Officer Commanding, Joint Operations Headquarters; Commander of the Sri Lankan Army; Chief of Staff of the Sri Lankan Army
- Conflicts: 1971 Insurrection, Sri Lankan Civil War
- Awards: Vishista Seva Vibhushanaya
- Other work: High Commissioner to Canada

General Tissa Indraka Weeratunga, VSV (August 29, 1930 – November 2003) was a Sri Lankan general. He was the Commander of the Sri Lankan Army from 1981 to 1985 and the first General Officer Commanding (GOC) of the Joint Operations Headquarters (JOH) (later known as the Chief of the Defence Staff), he was later Sri Lanka's High Commissioner to Canada from 1986 till 1990.

== Early life and education ==
Born to Arthur Weeratunga, a planter from Matara and Henrietta Weeratunga (née Gurusingha). He had one sister, Krishnajina Weeratunga who married Ana Seneviratne, a police officer who served as Inspector General of Police from 1978 to 1982. Tissa Weeratunga was educated at the Royal College, Colombo.

== Military career ==
=== Early career ===
Weeratunga joined the newly formed Ceylon Army on 11 October 1949, in its first cadet officer intake and received his basic officer training at the Mons Officer Cadet School, Aldershot and at the Royal Military Academy, Sandhurst, and was commissioned as a second lieutenant and posted to the Ceylon Light Infantry on 2 August 1951. He was appointed adjutant of the Ruhunu Regiment on 4 July 1956; adjutant of the 1 Battalion, Ceylon Light Infantry on 22 October 1956 and Staff Captain Administration Branch at Army Headquarters on 25 July 1958. He was transferred to the Corps of Infantry on 8 December 1962 and posted later to the Gemunu Watch on its formation. In December 1965, he was appointed brigade major of the 1st Brigade Group in Panagoda. From 23 February 1966 to 1 November 1967 he served as the Military Liaison Officer in the Ministry of External Affairs and Defence. He had followed the Unit Commander’s Course in Australia and the Joint Service Defence College.

=== Field command ===
On 1 September 1968, he was appointed the acting commanding officer of the 1st Battalion of the Gemunu Watch. He was promoted to the rank of lieutenant colonel on 1 October 1969 and confirmed as the Commanding Officer. Later he took command of the Ceylon Army General Service Corps and the Ceylon Army Pioneer Corps. With the outbreak of the 1971 Insurrection, he was appointed Military Coordinating Officer of the Monaragala District on 15 August 1971 and thereafter served as Military Coordinating Officer of the Kurunegala District from 16 April 1972 to 7 May 1972.

On 1 December 1972 he was appointed Commander, Task Force Anti Illicit Immigration (TAFII) in Jaffna serving till 1 March 1976, having been promoted to the rank of colonel on 1 January 1974. On 1 March 1976, he was appointed Commander Western Command and later made Director Operations and Training at Army Headquarters on 15 September 1977. On 1 December 1977, he was promoted to the rank of brigadier and appointed Inspector of Training of the Army. He attended the National Defence College, India and on his return he served as Competent Authority for Sri Lanka Airports.

=== Higher command ===
On 18 March 1979, he was appointed Chief of Staff of the Sri Lanka Army. Concurrently, Brigadier Weeratunga was then tasked by President J. R. Jayawardene to clamp down on the Tamil militancy that was taking root in Jaffna and was dispatched to Jaffna as Overall Operational Commander, with extensive powers under the provisions of Prevention of Terrorism (Special Provisions) Act No: 48 of 1979. From 13 July 1979 to 31 December 1979, Brigadier Weeratunga led extensive operations to root out the elements of Tamil militant groups forcing them to take refuge in India and reducing their terrorist activity.

He was promoted to the rank of major general and made Commander of the Sri Lankan Army on 14 October 1981, and held the post till 2 November 1985. His tenure marked the start of the Sri Lankan Civil War with the LTTE ambush of the army patrol Four Four Bravo in July 1983. He undertook several reforms in the army, including the formation of the Gajaba Regiment and undertaking the rapid expansion of the army to cope with the civil war.

He was promoted to the rank of lieutenant general and appointed the first general officer commanding of the Joint Operation Command on 11 February 1985 to co-ordinate army, navy and air force counter-terrorist operations in the north and east of Sri Lanka. He retired from the army on 29 August 1985 and was promoted to the rank of general on the same day. Brigadier Cyril Ranatunga was brought out of retirement with the rank of lieutenant general to succeed General Weeratunga.

== Later life ==
After retiring from the army he was appointed Sri Lankan High Commissioner to Canada in October 1989 and served till 1990. He died at the age of 73 in November 2003 and was cremated with full military honours at General Cemetery Kanatte on November 9, 2003.

== Honors ==
His decorations include the Vishista Seva Vibhushanaya (VSV), Republic of Sri Lanka Armed Services Medal, Sri Lanka Army 25th Anniversary Medal, Ceylon Armed Services Long Service Medal, Sri Lanka Armed Services Long Service Medal, President's Inauguration Medal and the Ceylon Armed Services Inauguration Medal.

== Family ==
Weeratunga was married to Sonia Evangeline St.Clair Rhode and had three children: Rohan, Ajith and Annouchka.

== See also ==
- Sri Lankan Non Career Diplomats

Military offices
Preceded by Post created	GOC of the Joint Operation Command; 1985–1986	Succeeded by Cyril Ranatunge
Preceded by Denis Perera	Commander of the Sri Lankan Army; 1981–1985	Succeeded by Nalin Seneviratne

Diplomatic posts
Preceded by ?	Sri Lankan High Commissioners to Canada; 1986–1990	Succeeded by ?
