= Denis Perera =

Sri Lankan army general and diplomat (1930–2013)

General Denis Perera ඩෙනිස් පෙරේරා
- Born: 10 October 1930; Gampaha, Ceylon
- Died: 11 August 2013 (aged 82); Colombo, Sri Lanka
- Military career
- Allegiance: Sri Lanka
- Branch: Ceylon Army, Sri Lanka Army
- Service years: 1951–1981
- Rank: General
- Unit: Sri Lanka Engineers
- Commands: Commander of the Sri Lanka Army, Chief of Staff of the Sri Lanka Army
- Conflicts: 1971 Insurrection, Sri Lankan Civil War
- Awards: Vishista Seva Vibhushanaya
- Other work: Chancellor of KDU, High Commissioner to Australia

General Joseph Everard Denis Perera (10 October 1930 – 11 August 2013) was a senior Sri Lanka Army officer who served as Commander of the Sri Lankan Army from 1977 to 1981. He was also the Sri Lankan High Commissioner to Australia, Chairman of the Securities and Exchange Commission and the Ceylon Tobacco Company and Chancellor of General Sir John Kotelawala Defence University. He envisioned a women's corps in the army which resulted in the creation of the Sri Lanka Army Women's Corps in 1979. He is regarded as the father of the Sri Lanka Army Women's Corps.

== Early life and family ==
Born to Mudaliyar Maurice Perera and his wife Trisette Perera, he was the youngest in the family with an elder sister and was educated at St Peter's College, Colombo.

== Military career ==
=== Early career ===
Perera was selected as one of first ten candidates to join the Ceylon Army on its formation as Cadet Officers. Joining the newly formed Ceylon army on his nineteenth birthday, he received his basic officer training at Mons Officer Cadet School and thereafter at the Royal Military Academy, Sandhurst, and was commissioned as Second Lieutenant in the First Field Engineers on 2 August 1951. Thereafter served for some time with a unit of the British Army of the Rhine. On his return he was stationed at the Diyatalawa garrison, taking part in the formation of the new engineering squadron and later moved to the newly built Panagoda Cantonment in 1953, where the Ceylon Engineers was formed in 1957. During this time he had been promoted to Lieutenant on 2 February 1953 and Captain on 2 February 1956; having served as an engineering troop and squadron commander. He thereafter served as Staff Captain (Administration) at Army Headquarters. In 1957 he attended the Royal School of Military Engineering and on his return he was on his return he was appointed Officer Commanding, Ceylon School of Military Engineering. On 1 October 1960, he was promoted to the rank of Major and in 1961 he attended the British Army Staff College, Camberley.

=== Higher command ===
He then served as the Military Attaché of the High Commission of Ceylon in London for three years and thereafter served as second in command of the 1st Field Engineer Regiment, Ceylon Engineers. He initiated the indigenous officer training program at the Army Training Centre in 1968. Promoted to Lieutenant Colonel on 1 October 1969, he was the Commandant of the Army Training Centre from 1969 to 1972 during the 1971 Insurrection and served as Commander, Southern Command. Thereafter having attended the National Defence College, New Delhi, he served as Commander, Northern Command; Director Plans and Director Operations and Training at Army Headquarters before being appointed Chief of Staff, having been promoted Colonel on 31 January 1973. In 1976 he served as the chief coordinator for all foreign delegations during the Non Aligned Nations Summit and was promoted to Brigadier on 5 August 1977.

=== Army commander ===
Promoted to Major General on 14 October 1977, he was appointed Commander of the Sri Lankan Army, as the youngest officer to be promoted to the post at age of 46 and first engineering officer. He would hold this post till 31 October 1981 when he retired from the army having been promoted to the rank of Lieutenant General on his last day of service. After 26 years of his retirement, in 2007 he was awarded the rank of full general.

During his tenure as the army commander, he played a pivotal role in establishing the Sir John Kotelawala Defence Academy (KDA) after receiving Kandawala from Sir John Kotelawala to establish a defence University. For establishing the KDA, he was made a Fellow of the Chartered Management Institute of the United Kingdom and the Institute of Management of Sri Lanka. KDA awarded him a Doctor of Letters (Honoris Causa) and he was made its second Chancellor on 9 November 1995 and served till 30 December 2010. He created the path for Sri Lankan women to join the army as ordinary soldiers by coining the idea of the Sri Lanka Army Women's Corps.

== Later years and death ==
Following his retirement from the army he lived a very active life, he was appointed Sri Lanka's High Commissioner to Australia – which also include accreditation to New Zealand, Papua New Guinea and Fiji. He was the chairman (non-executive) of the Securities & Exchange Commission, Ceylon Tobacco Company, Blackwood Hodge Engineering and GTE Directories Lanka. He founded the Association of Retired Flag Rank Officers; he was the President of the National Rifle Association and the Sri Lanka Badminton Foundation; and a committee member of the Sports Shooting Association.

In 2000 he was awarded the title of Deshamanya by the Sri Lankan government, and in 2007 promoted to the rank of General.

He died on 11 August 2013.

== Family ==
He was married to Ranjini Perera and had three sons: Kavan, Dinesh and Druvi. His eldest son, Kavan Perera, is married to Dushyanthi nee Seneviratne the daughter of General Nalin Seneviratne and they have two daughters, Kamani and Dayani. His second son is married to Shakila Chandratilleke, and they have three sons, like Denis himself, Shanil, Chalana and Meshan. His youngest son, Druvi, is married to Tanojie Samarasinghe and they have two sons Avindra and Shivendra.

== Honors and decorations ==
=== Medals ===
General Perera was the first officer to be awarded the Vishista Seva Vibhushanaya (VSV) for over 25 years of distinguished service in the army in 1980 after military honours were reconstituted in Sri Lanka, his other medals include the Ceylon Armed Services Long Service Medal, Sri Lanka Armed Services Long Service Medal, Sri Lanka Army 25th Anniversary Medal, Republic of Sri Lanka Armed Services Medal, the President's Inauguration Medal, the Ceylon Armed Services Inauguration Medal and the Sri Lanka Army Volunteer Force Centenary Medal.

=== Honors ===
- In 2007 the Government of Sri Lanka promoted him to the honorary rank of General.
- Chancellor of the General Sir John Kotelawala Defence University.
- He was awarded the title Deshamanya from the Government of Sri Lanka in 2000.
- Order of National Security Merit from the Government of South Korea
- Vishista Seva Vibhushanaya – 1981
- Fellow of the Chartered Management Institute
- Fellow of the Institute of Management – Sri Lanka.

== See also ==
- Sri Lankan Non Career Diplomats

Military offices
Preceded by D. S. Attygalle	Commander of the Sri Lankan Army; 1977–1981	Succeeded by T. I. Weerathunga
