= Task Force Anti Illicit Immigration =

Sri Lankan army unit

Task Force Anti Illicit Immigration (TAFII) was a task force deployed by the Sri Lanka Army from 1963 from 1981 to counter illegal immigration from South India. It was the first field formation deployed by the Ceylon Army and had its headquarters at Palaly.

== History ==
=== Operations Monty ===
TAFII originated from "Operations Monty" named after then Parliamentary Secretary to the Minister of External Affairs and Defense, Major Montague Jayawickrama in 1952 to stop illegal immigration of Indian Tamils repatriated to India after they were refused citizenship by the government of Ceylon following the Ceylon Citizenship Act and subsequent legislation. Formed under the command of Lt. Colonel H. W. G. Wijeyekoon, a detachment of the Ceylon Army was deployed to patrol the 72 mile stretch of coastline starting at Palagamunai, nine miles north of Mannar, right round the island of Mannar, and terminating at Achchankulam, twelve miles south of Mannar to stop human smugglers. This military aid to the civil powers operation started in support of the police which lacked the numbers to cover the large area.

=== Jaffna satyagraha incident ===
In July 1960, Sirima Bandaranaike was appointed the first female prime minister in the world after her party secured a majority in parliament in the July 1960 general election. Her government announced the full operation of the Sinhala Only Act from January 1961, making Sinhala the only official language in the courts of law throughout the country. The Federal Party launched a campaign of civil disobedience in January 1961, beginning in Jaffna with Federal Party members staging a satyagraha on 20 February 1961 at the Jaffna Kachcheri, led by S. J. V. Chelvanayakam. The police baton charged the protesters at the Jaffna Kachcheri after they prevented the Government Agent and Superintendent of Police from leaving the Kachcheri. Several Tamil MPs were injured. At the end of the day, Chelvanayakam issued a press statement saying that it was "a great day for the Tamil-speaking people of Ceylon. This was the day we resorted to direct action to win our freedom". The protests soon spread to other parts of the Northern and Eastern Provinces and Bandaranaike accused the Federal Party of trying to establish a separate state. On Bandaranaike request the Governor General of Ceylon declared a state of emergency under the provisions of the Public Security Ordinance in the Northern Province and dispatched the 1st Battalion, Ceylon Light Infantry under the command of Lieutenant Colonel Richard Udugama, who was soon appointed Garrison Commander, Troops Jaffna. The government ordered the Army to clear the satyagraha and arrested the protesters. The Federal Party was banned.

According to the former Government Agent of Jaffna District Neville Jayaweera, the Ceylonese civil servant N.Q. Dias, who had been appointed Permanent Secretary to the Ministry of External Affairs and Defence in June 1961, had anticipated that the Tamil population would resort to armed struggle in response forceful suppression of their protests against the implementation of Sinhala as the official language of administration and courts without any concession to the Tamil Language. N.Q. Dias, a Sinhalese Buddhist nationalist who had assisted the formation of the Mahajana Eksath Peramuna and its landslide victory in the 1956 general election which led to S. W. R. D. Bandaranaike's appointment as prime minister, exerted powerful influence over the government of Prime Minister Bandaranaike and played a significant role in the adoption of Sinhala as the official language of administration and courts. To contain a future Tamil revolt with the support of India and to disguise the true intent, N.Q. Dias used the issues of illegal immigration from South India and smuggling as pretexts to establish permanent military camps in the Northern Province. He appointed Neville Jayaweera as the Government Agent (GA) of Jaffna District in August 1963 and assigned him with the task of assisting Lieutenant Colonel Sepala Attygalle in setting up the Task Force Anti Illicit Immigration. Describing his assigned task, Jayaweera recounted:

As for my role as the GA of Jaffna, Dias said that while facilitating the construction of the proposed military camps girdling the Northern Province, I should be “unrelenting” towards Tamil demands, and wherever possible, “force confrontations” with them and establish the government's “undisputed ascendancy”. He emphasized that the best way to engineer the government's ascendancy was by enforcing the Sinhala Only policy at any cost [...] He was of the view that the government had failed so far to deal with the Tamils forcefully enough and saw me as the answer to the problem! Obviously, N.Q. Dias was seeing me as an administrative Rottweiler to be let loose within the sheep pen of protesting Tamil satyagrahis!

=== TAFII formation ===
In 1963, Operations Monty was formally renamed as Task Force Anti Illicit Immigration as a permanent formation in support of Royal Ceylon Navy coastal patrols and police operations. Initially army contribution was known as "Army Force M" consisted of an infantry battalion with support units based in the coast of Mannar. The task force had its headquarters at Palaly and had units deployed from Mollikulam point to Kokilai. There were army camps in Silavathurai, Thalladi, Talaimannar, Pooneryn, Valvettithurai, Madagala, Thondamannar, Mullaitivu and Kokilai. In addition several smaller detachments of 5-10 soldiers each were located.

=== Counter insurgency operations ===
After 1972, TAFII shifted its focus to counter insurgency operations with the raise of the Tamil militancy. It was disbanded in 1980 with the onset of the Sri Lankan Civil War and was replaced by the Task Force 4 Northern Command.

== Past commanding officers, Ops Monty ==
- Maj. General H. W. G. Wijeyekoon

== Past commanders TAFII ==
- Colonel Sepala Attygalle 1963–1965
- Colonel M. A. Jayaweera 1965–1966
- Colonel P. D. Ramayanayake 1969–1970
- Colonel E. T. De Z Abeysekera 1970–1971
- Colonel B. K. V. J. E. Rodrigo 1971–1972
- Colonel Tissa Weeratunga 1972–1976
- Colonel Henry Athukorale 1976–1977
- Colonel M Medawala 1977–1977
- Colonel G D Fernando 1977–1978

== Notable members ==
- General Nalin Seneviratne – former staff officer, TAFII
- Lt. General Denzil Kobbekaduwa – former staff officer, TAFII
- Lt. Colonel Gotabaya Rajapaksa – former signals officer, TAFII
- Brigadier M. H. Gunaratne – officer commanding troops, TAFII
- Major General D.W. Hapuarachchi – officer commanding troops, TAFII
- Lt. Colonel Bertie Dias – officer commanding troops, TAFII
