= Arrest of Ahnaf Jazeem =

Tamil Muslim poet

Ahnaf Jazeem (pen name, Mannaramuthu Ahnaf) is a Tamil Muslim poet from Silavathurai, Mannar, Northern Province, Sri Lanka.

Ahnaf wrote a Tamil poetry anthology called Navarasam in 2017 and was arrested under the Prevention of Terrorism Act. The Act stated that Navarasam promoted extremism, and Ahnaf was detained without charge for over a year. Amnesty International, Human Rights Watch, Sri Lanka Campaign for Peace and Justice and European human rights ambassadors have called for his release.

He was released on bail on December 15, 2021, though is still facing restrictions.

== Background ==
The Prevention of Terrorism Act was signed into law in 1982. Before his arrest, Jazeem was working as a teacher at a private school in Puttalam. He was living in a building owned by a Muslim charity organization called Save the Pearls, which police have tried to link to extremist movements. In July 2017, he published the Tamil poetry collection Navarasam, which was never banned in Sri Lanka.

He was arrested on 16 May 2020.

== International Response and Release ==
A number of organizations, including Human Rights Watch, PEN International, Amnesty International, Article 19 and People for Equality and Relief in Lanka called for his release on May 16, 2021.

On December 15, 2021, he was released on bail, though he remains unable to work due to the bail conditions.

His arrest was ruled a violation of international law by the Working Group on Arbitrary Detention in June 2022.
