= Nalin Seneviratne =

Sri Lanka Army general

General Nalin Seneviratne VSV
- Born: 25 August 1931
- Died: 12 August 2009 (aged 77)
- Military career
- Allegiance: Sri Lanka
- Branch: Sri Lanka Army
- Service years: 1953–1988
- Rank: General
- Unit: Sri Lanka Engineers
- Commands: Commander of the Army
- Conflicts: 1971 Insurrection, Sri Lankan Civil War
- Awards: Vishista Seva Vibhushanaya
- Other work: Governor of the North East Province

General Ganegoda Appuhamelage Don Granville Nalin Seneviratne, VSV (August 25, 1931 – August 12, 2009) was a Sri Lanka Army general. He was the Commander of the Sri Lankan Army from 1985 to 1988 and first Governor of the North East Province.

== Early life and education ==
Born to Irwin Seneviratne and Irene Seneviratne née Rodrigo from Sapugaskanda, Heiyantuduwa in Gampaha District. He had three brothers. The eldest two were Tissa Seneviratne, an Engineer and Ana Seneviratne, a police officer who served as Inspector General of Police from 1978 to 1982; the youngest was Gamini Seneviratne, a diplomat who was Sri Lankan Ambassador to Thailand and Republic of Korea. Educated at Royal College Colombo, Seneviratne excelled in sports and academics. He took part in athletics and rugby, and was a Regimental Sergeant Major of the College Cadet Corps.

== Military career ==
=== Early career ===
Seneviratne joined the Ceylon Army after completing his schooling on 1 October 1951 as a cadet officer and received his basic training at Royal Military Academy, Sandhurst from 12 January 1952 to 2 July 1953. On completion of his training at Sandhurst, he was commissioned as a second lieutenant on 30 July 1953 and posted to the 1st Field Engineer Regiment, Ceylon Engineers. He thereafter attended the Young Officers course at the Royal School of Military Engineering in Chatham before returning to Ceylon. He received promotions to the ranks of lieutenant in 1955, captain in 1958 and major in 1963. He received promotions to the ranks of lieutenant in 1955, captain in 1958 and major in 1963. During this time he had served as a General Staff Officer (Grade III) at Army Headquarters and Staff Officer - II at the HQ, Task Force Anti Illicit Immigration. He was the first officer from the Ceylon Army to attend the Engineering Officers' Construction, Planning and Operation Course at the United States Army Engineer School at Fort Belvoir in the 1960s.

=== Field command ===
He was appointed commanding officer of the 1st Field Engineer Regiment on 6 December 1970, serving till 16 May 1977. He was promoted to the rank of lieutenant colonel in December 1971 and colonel in January 1977. During this time he served as an Extra Aide-de-camp to the President. He was the Commander Engineer Group from 1977 to 1980. Whilst serving in the Army, he was seconded to the Ceylon Shipping Corporation for two years and a member of the Board of Directors of the Tractor Corporation from 1977 to 1980. He was appointed Director Engineer Services and later Director Designated Budget and Financial Management before being promoted to the rank of brigadier on 31 December 1981. He served as Commander - Support Force, Panagoda; Commander - Security Force, Jaffna and Coordinating Officer of Jaffna and Kilinochchi. He attended the National Security and Strategic Study course at the National Defence College in New Delhi.

=== Higher command ===
On 11 February 1985, he was appointed the 10th commander of the Sri Lanka Army and promoted to the rank of major general. The following year he was promoted to lieutenant general. Commanding the army for over three years, he oversaw the largest military operation undertaken to that date, the Vadamarachchi Operation and carried out a rapid expansion of the army. He retired on 16 August 1988.

=== Decorations ===
He had been awarded the Vishista Seva Vibhushanaya (VSV) for over 25 years of distinguished service in the army, his other medals include the Republic of Sri Lanka Armed Services Medal, Sri Lanka Army 25th Anniversary Medal, Ceylon Armed Services Long Service Medal, Sri Lanka Armed Services Long Service Medal, President's Inauguration Medal and the Purna Bhumi Padakkama.

== Later life ==
On retirement from the Army, Lieutenant General Seneviratne was appointed the first Governor of the North East Province from 30 November 1988 and served until 30 November 1993. In 2007 he was promoted to the rank of general along with nine other former service chiefs. He died August 12, 2009, aged 78 and last rites carried out with full military honours at the Borella General Cemetery.

== Family ==
He was married to Mala Seneviratne, their only child Dushyanthi was the principal cellist of the Symphony Orchestra of Sri Lanka and is married to Khavan Perera, son of General Denis Perera.

Political offices
Preceded by Office created	Governor of North Eastern Province; 1988–1993	Succeeded by Lionel Fernando
Military offices
Preceded by T. I. Weerathunga	Commander of the Sri Lankan Army; 1985–1988	Succeeded by Hamilton Wanasinghe
