= E. T. De Z Abeysekera =

Sri Lankan military officer

- Born: 3 May 1921; Colombo, Sri Lanka
- Died: 13 August 2004 (aged 83); Kirulapana, Colombo, Sri Lanka
- Military career
- Allegiance: Sri Lanka
- Branch: Sri Lanka Army
- Service years: 1941–1946; 1949–1976
- Rank: Brigadier
- Service number: O/50021
- Unit: Sri Lanka Light Infantry
- Commands: Chief of Staff, Sri Lanka Army
- Conflicts: World War II; First JVP Insurrection

Brigadier Edirimuni Tennison De Zoysa Abeysekara (3 May 1921 – 13 August 2004) was a Sri Lankan military leader, who served as the Chief of Staff of the Sri Lanka Army.

== Early life ==
Born in Colombo, De Z Abeysekera was educated at Saint Joseph's College, Colombo, where completed his University of London Matriculation examination. A keen sportsmen, he played cricket of the college team.

== Ceylon Defense Force ==
De Z Abeysekera joined the Ceylon Defence Force during World War II in 1941. Following his basic training he received an emergency war commission as a second lieutenant in the Ceylon Light Infantry on 3 March 1944. That year he attended a Young Officers Course at the Ceylon Defence Forces Training School in Diyatalawa and an advance training course on Chemical Warfare in India, where he became an Qualified Instructor. He also attend an Assault Pioneer Qualifying Course at the Infantry School in India and an Advance Battle Course in Ceylon. He was promoted to the rank of lieutenant on 3 September 1943, to the rank of captain on 26 June 1944 and confirmed on 12 February 1945. With the end of the war, he was decommissioned on 23 August 1946.

== Ceylon Army ==
With the formation of the Ceylon Army in 1949, he was commissioned in the regular force as a second lieutenant on 19 October 1949 and subsequently promoted to the rank of Lieutenant. He was initially posted as a platoon commander in the Army Recruit Training Depot and later attended a Platoon Weapons Course at the Small Arms School, Hythe. In 1951, he was posted to the 1st Battalion, Ceylon Light Infantry (1CLI). Promoted captain on 1 January 1952, he attended the Platoon Commanders Course and the Company Commanders Course at the School of Infantry, Warminster which was followed by an attachment to a British infantry regiment. Later that year he attended a Jungle Warfare Course at the British Army Jungle Warfare Training School in Malaya. He had obtained the grading of instructor in most of the courses he attended. In October 1956, he was promoted to the rank of major and appointed officer commanding, Headquarters Company of 1CLI. In 1961, he was appointed as Military Liaison Officer of the Ministry of External Affairs and Defence. He was appointed Aide-de-camp to the Governor General of Ceylon and served till November 1963 when he was appointed second in command of the 1st Battalion, Ceylon Light Infantry. Promoted to lieutenant colonel he was appointed commanding officer of the 1st Battalion, Ceylon Light Infantry on 5 November 1965, serving till 11 February 1969. During this time he concurrently served as the commanding officer of the 1st Battalion, Ceylon Sinha Regiment from 5 March 1967 to 30 April 1968. In 1968 he attended a diploma course in financial management at the United States Army Financial Management School.

He was promoted to the rank of Colonel on 21 March 1969 and served as commander, Task Force Anti Illicit Immigration from July 1970 to December 1971. With the onset of the 1971 Insurrection, he served as the Military Coordinating Officer to the Anuradhapura District, the Matara District and the Galle District. Promoted to brigadier, he served as the Brigade Commander of 1st Brigade Group Panagoda on 1 November 1972 serving till 1 January 1974. On 1 November 1973 he was appointed Chief of Staff of the Army from 1 November 1973, serving till his retirement on 2 May 1976. During this time he served as the acting Commandant of the Volunteer Force from 1 November 1973 to 21 July 1974.

For wartime service in World War II, he had earned the Defence Medal (United Kingdom) (1944) and the War Medal 1939–1945 (1945), and for service in the Ceylon Army, he received the Ceylon Armed Services Long Service Medal (1949), the Ceylon Armed Services Inauguration Medal (1962) and the Sri Lanka Army 25th Anniversary Medal (1974).

== Later life ==
Following his retirement he served as a member of the Association of Retired Flag Rank Officers (ARFRO). He died at his home Kirulapana on 13 August 2004.
