= Basil Horsfall =

British-Ceylonese recipient of the Victoria Cross

Basil Arthur Horsfall
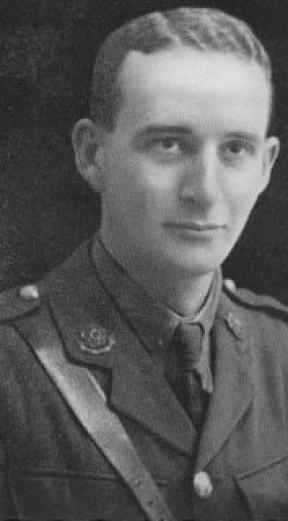
- Lt. Basil Arthur Horsfall VC
- Born: 4 October 1887; Colombo, Ceylon
- Died: 21 March 1918 (aged 30); Between Moyenneville and Ablainzevelle, France
- Military career
- Allegiance: United Kingdom
- Branch: British Army
- Service years: 1917 – 1918
- Rank: Second Lieutenant
- Units: Ceylon Engineer Volunteers; East Lancashire Regiment
- Conflicts: World War I †
- Awards: Victoria Cross

Second Lieutenant Basil Arthur Horsfall, VC (4 October 1887 – 27 March 1918) was a British-Ceylonese recipient of the Victoria Cross, the highest and most prestigious award for gallantry in the face of the enemy that can be awarded to British and Commonwealth forces.

== Early life ==
Born on 4 October 1887 in Colombo, Ceylon (now Sri Lanka), Horsfall was educated at S. Thomas' College, Mount Lavinia in Ceylon and at Sir William Borlase's Grammar School, Marlow in England. He left a position with Barclay's Bank, London, to become a rubber planter back in Ceylon, where he also held a civil service position with the Public Works Department and served with the Ceylon Engineer Volunteers. During World War I, he returned to Britain in July 1916 to enlist in the British Army and was commissioned as a 2nd Lieutenant in the East Lancashire Regiment in December. He was wounded at Rouex on 11 May 1917 while serving with the 1st Battalion. After recovering from his wound he joined the 11th Battalion, (the Accrington Pals), in the autumn of 1917.

== Victoria Cross ==
On 21 March 1918, between Moyenneville and Ablainzevelle, France, the Germans attacked positions held by Second Lieutenant Horsfall's centre platoon. After his three forward sections were driven back, he was wounded in the head by enemy fire. Ignoring the wound, he immediately reorganised what remained of his troops and counterattacked to regain his original position. Despite the severity of his head wound, he refused to go to the dressing station, as the three other officers in his company had been killed. Later, he made another counterattack, but was ordered to withdraw. The last to leave his position, he was shot soon afterwards.

== Distinctions and tributes ==
- Victoria Cross. Horsfall's medal is kept in the Queen's Lancashire Regiment Museum at Fulwood Barracks, Preston, Lancashire.
- Horsfall's name is on the Arras Memorial in France. It is not known where he is buried.
- The school of Ablainzevelle was named after Horsfall in 2019.

There is a blue plaque commemorating Horsfall on the front wall of Borlase School in Marlow. His name is recorded on the war memorial inside the school chapel and a replica of his VC is placed inside the chapel.
