= 14 CBRN Regiment (Sri Lanka) =

- Active: 15 July 2016
- Country: Sri Lanka
- Branch: Sri Lanka Army
- Type: Regiment
- Role: CBRN Regiment
- Size: 5 sub-units
- Engagements: Sri Lankan Civil War

Commanders
- Current commander: Lieutenant Colonel T. D. P. Siriwardana

14 CBRN Regiment (Chemical Biological Radiology and Nuclear Regiment), Sri Lanka Engineers (Sinhala: 14 වන රසායනික ජීව විද්‍යාත්මක විකිරණශීලී හා න්‍යෂ්ටික රෙජිමේන්තුව, romanized: 14 vana rasāyanika jīva vidyātmaka vikiraṇaśīlī hā nyaṣṭika rejimēntuva) is a regiment of the Sri Lanka Army that focuses on countering chemical, biological, radiological and nuclear (CBRN) hazards in the country. The Sri Lanka Navy and Sri Lanka Air Force also maintain CBRN units in addition to the Army's CBRN regiment. The regiment evolved from the first CBRN squadron that Major General Jagath Gunawardena, the current colonel-commandant of Sri Lanka Engineers, established.

== History ==
As the Wanni Humanitarian Operation was gaining momentum against the LTTE, the Sri Lanka Army embarked on the task of raising additional battalions in support of the operation. In the process, 14 Sri Lanka Engineer Regiment was raised on 15 July 2016 at Thrikonamadu as a reinforcement (RFT) battalion after the completion of battalion training at Infantry Training Centre, Minneriya in June and July 2008. At the inception, 9 officers and 356 other ranks were posted to the unit from other units of the Corps of Engineers and Major S. R. Dias RSP SLE (later Lieutenant Colonel) assumed duties as the first Commanding Officer.

On 16 July 2006, the unit was airlifted to Wanni and placed under the command of the 571 Brigade in the elite 57 Division. The Battalion Headquarters was located at Periyamadu and the unit strength was increased with the arrival of new recruits. Due to operational requirements, within a very short period of time the unit was assigned to several formations including 571, 572, 574 and 573 Brigades respectively, before being assigned to Task Force 3 in November 2008. In December 2008, the unit was again placed under command of the 573 Brigade before being transferred to 53 Division for a short period. Meanwhile, unit headquarters was shifted to Maankulam. During the period, troops from the unit actively engaged in Small Group Operations alongside the infantry. The initial confrontations provided valuable experience from which the regiment's troops gained confidence, enabling them to contribute to the final success of the operation.

In establishing a CBRN regiment Major General Jagath Gunawardena, the current colonel-commandant of Sri Lanka Engineers, played a major role. He established the first CBRN squadron of the Sri Lanka Army, which later became the 14 CBRN Regiment, Sri Lanka Engineers. The regiment also contributed personnel to the Sri Lanka Army Rescue Operations Contingent that responded to the April 2015 Nepal earthquake.

== Training ==
The Sri Lanka School of Military Engineering conducts basic and advanced CBRN courses for Army and Navy personnel. Personnel receive local and foreign training from the National Authority for the Implementation of the Chemical Weapons Convention (CWC) of the Ministry of Industry and Commerce, and the Organization for the Prohibition of Chemical Weapons (OPCW). The regiment provides personnel to support the Basic Training Course on Emergency Response at Chemical Incidents.

== Structure ==
The regiment consists of the following sub-units:

- 140 HQ Squadron
- 141 Field Squadron
- 142 Field Squadron
- 143 Field Squadron
- 144 Field Squadron
