= Overall Operational Commander =

Sri Lankan military title

- Incumbent; Major General Sathyapriya Liyanage since 29 April 2019
- Army, Navy, Air Force and Police
- Style: Overall Operational Commander
- Type: Overall Operations Commander of all security forces and Police units within a certain area or in a theatre of operation
- Reports to: Chief of the Defence Staff
- Precursor: Major General Shantha Kottegoda
- Formation: 1979
- First holder: Brigadier Tissa Weeratunga

Overall Operational Commander is the title held by the most senior commander in a theatre of operation at certain times in Sri Lanka.

== History ==
It originated as a term Officer Commanding Troops of the Ceylon Army, when a senior officer was put in charge of multiple units in a geographical area. With the escalation of the Tamil militancy in the Jaffna Peninsula, President J. R. Jayawardene dispatched Brigadier Tissa Weeratunga to Jaffna as Commander Security Forces - Jaffna, with extensive powers under the provisions of Prevention of Terrorism (Special Provisions) Act No: 48 of 1979. Brigadier Weeratunga served as Commander Security Forces - Jaffna from 13 July 1979 to 31 December 1979 undertaking counter insurgency operations to reduce militant activities. In October 1981, Brigadier J. G. Balthazar was appointed Commander Security Forces - Jaffna following an increase of militant activities.

== List of Commanders ==
- Brigadier Tissa Weeratunga - Commander Security Forces - Jaffna (1979)
- Brigadier J. G. Balthazar - Commander Security Forces - Jaffna (1981-1984)
- Brigadier Nalin Seneviratne - Commander Security Forces - Jaffna (1984-1985)
- Brigadier G. H. De Silva - Overall Operations Commander, Operation Liberation (1987)
- Major General Denzil Kobbekaduwa - Overall Operations Commander, Northern Sector (1990-1992)
- Major General Rohan Daluwatte - Overall Operations Commander, North and East (1994-1995)
- Major General Janaka Perera - Overall Operations Commander, North (2000)
- Major General Shantha Kottegoda - Overall Operations Commander, East (2004)
- Major General Sathyapriya Liyanage - Overall Operational Commander, Overall Operational Command (2019)

== See also ==
- Operation Combine
