= Ana Seneviratne =

Sri Lankan diplomat

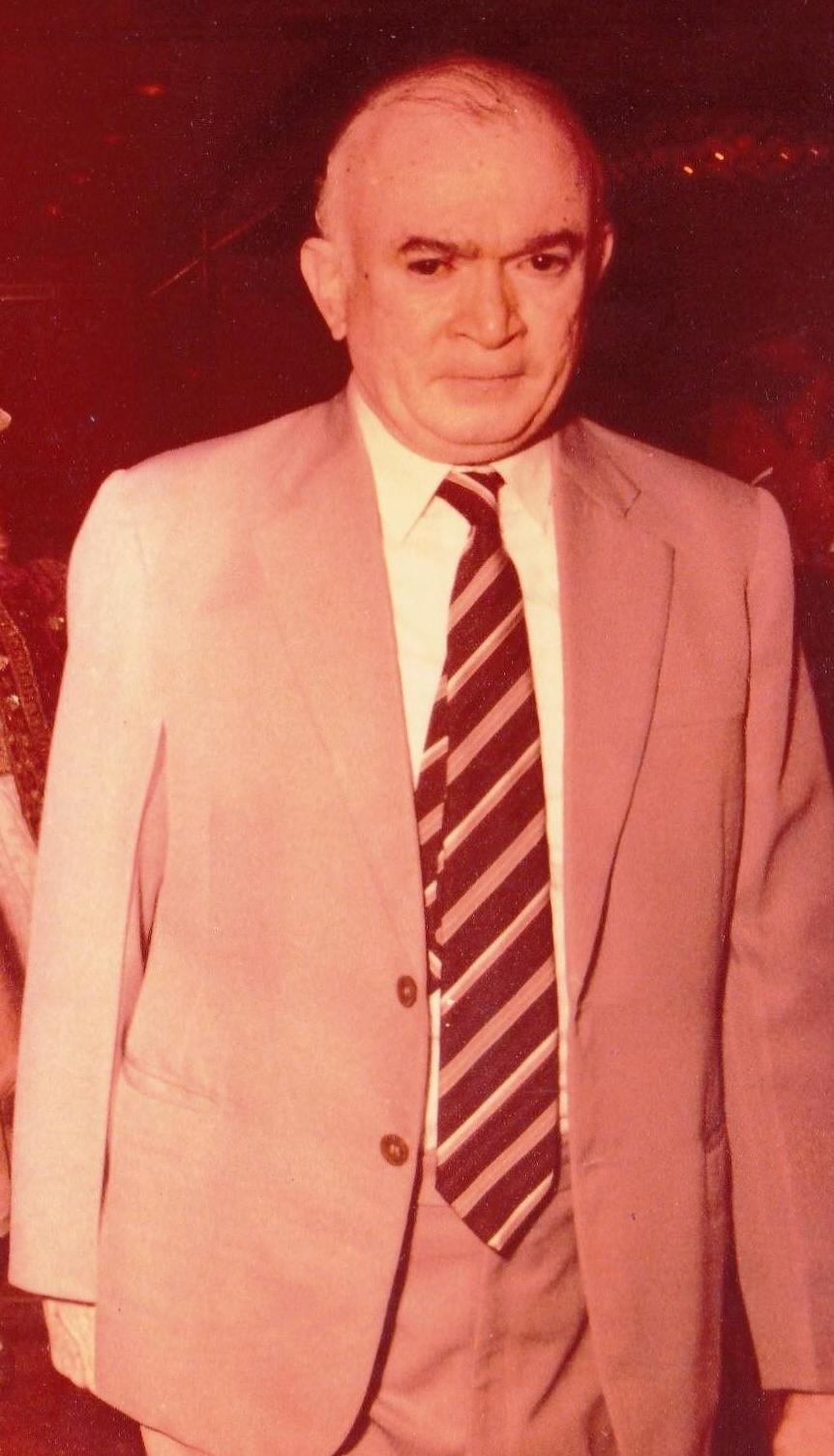
- Born: 20 April 1927; Ceylon
- Died: 26 September 2015 (aged 88)
- Police career
- Allegiance: Sri Lanka
- Department: Sri Lanka Police Service
- Rank: Inspector-General of Police
- Other work: Sri Lankan High Commissioner to Malaysia; Adviser to Cabinet Minister of National Security; Member Public Service Commission of Sri Lanka

Ganegoda Appuhamelage Don Edmund Ananda Seneviratne (20 April 1927 – 26 September 2015) was a Sri Lankan police officer. He was the former Inspector-General of Police, Sri Lankan High Commissioner to Malaysia, former adviser to Cabinet Minister of National Security and ex member Public Service Commission of Sri Lanka.

== Early life and education ==
Ana Seneviratne was born to Irwin Seneviratne and Irene Seneviratne née Rodrigo from Sapugaskanda, Heiyantuduwa in Gampaha District. He had three brothers. Eldest brother Tissa was an Engineer and the two younger brothers were Nalin Seneviratne, an army officer who served as Commander of the Sri Lankan Army from 1985 to 1988 and Gamini Seneviratne, a diplomat who was Sri Lankan Ambassador to Thailand and Republic of Korea.

Educated at the Royal College, Colombo (1938 to 1946), he went to graduate from the University of Ceylon, Colombo (now University of Colombo), with an LL.B (Hons) Degree.

== Police career ==
After graduating from University, Seneviratne joined the Ceylon Police Force in 1951 as a probationary Assistant Superintendent of Police (ASP) and as ASP he served in various parts in Sri Lanka. Some of the divisions were Matugama, Tangalle and Kegalle. In 1966, Seneviratne as ASP (CID) was tasked with the investigation of the Gotabaya Kirambakanda murder case. He was the Superintendent of Police (SP) for the Kegalle District during the 1971 JVP Insurrection. In 1972, he was investigated by the Royal Commission appointed to inquire into the killing of Dodampe Mudalali.

He had also served as Officer-In-Charge of Sabaragamuwa Province, Western Province, Central Province, whole of Central Province and for the CID Special Branch. Thereafter he was the SP in-charge of Police Headquarters.

In February 1972, Ana Seneviratne was promoted to the rank of Deputy Inspector General of Police (DIG). Then he was in charge of the Northern range that was Jaffna Division, extended to North Central Province and Eastern Province. Later in 1978 he was appointed the Inspector General (IGP) of Police and served till 1982.

== Diplomatic career ==
In President J.R. Jayawardene's government, Ana Seneviratne was appointed the Sri Lanka High Commissioner to Malaysia in 1982 and served there till July 1985. During this time, he played an important role in promoting tourism and strengthening diplomatic relations.

== Family ==
He married Krishnajina Weeratunga, daughter of Arthur Weeratunga, a planter and Henrietta Weeratunga née Gurusingha of Matara. They had two children Charith and Aruni. His brother-in-law, was General Tissa Weeratunga, who was the Commander of the Sri Lankan Army. Seneviratne’s close family friends were his trusted Deputy Inspector General of Police Valentine Vama Vamadevan and wife Charmaine, daughter Marina Shivi and son Gerard Cecil. Also a close associate was his trusted aide de camp and later DIG Nimal Leuke.

== See also ==
- Sri Lankan Non Career Diplomats

== External links and references ==
- That meteoric rise in the Police Dept.
- Crushing the revolt
- He brought vision and meaning to Police Force
