= Sri Lanka Air Force 50th Anniversary Medal =

- Type: Anniversary medal
- Awarded for: Service
- Description: Suspended from a plain suspension bar
- Presented by: Sri Lanka
- Eligibility: All ranks of the Sri Lanka Air Force, both regular or volunteer, and civilians
- Clasps: None
- Status: No longer awarded
- Established: 2001
- First award: 2001
- Final award: 2001
- Ribbon bar

Precedence
- Next (higher): Sri Lanka Army 25th Anniversary Medal; Sri Lanka Navy 25th Anniversary Medal; Sri Lanka Air Force 25th Anniversary Medal
- Equivalent: Sri Lanka Army 50th Anniversary Medal; Sri Lanka Navy 50th Anniversary Medal
- Next (lower): Queen Elizabeth II Coronation Medal

The Sri Lanka Air Force 50th Anniversary Medal (Sinhala: ශ්‍රී ලංකා ගුවන් හමුදා 50වන සංවත්සර පදක්කම Śrī Laṃkā guwan hamudā panasvana sangwathsara padakkama) was awarded to all ranks of both the regular- and volunteer forces of the Sri Lanka Air Force, as well as civilians employed within it serving on 2 March 2001, the year of the 50th anniversary of the Air Force.
