= M. A. Jayaweera =

Sri Lankan military officer

- Military career
- Allegiance: Sri Lanka
- Branch: Sri Lanka Army
- Service years: 1940-1946; 1949-1974
- Rank: Brigadier
- Service number: O/50013
- Unit: Sri Lanka Light Infantry
- Commands: Chief of Staff, Sri Lanka Army, Task Force Anti Illicit Immigration, 1st Battalion, Ceylon Light Infantry
- Conflicts: World War II; First JVP Insurrection

Brigadier Maurice Anthony Jayaweera was a senior Sri Lanka Army officer. He served as the Chief of Staff of the Sri Lanka Army and the Commander, Task Force Anti Illicit Immigration.

Jayaweera joined the Ceylon Defence Force during World War II and received a war time commissioned into the Ceylon Light Infantry with its expansion in 1940 and served till he was demobilized in 1946 at the end of the war. With the formation of the Ceylon Army, Jayaweera transferred to a regular commission as a lieutenant in the 1st Battalion, Ceylon Infantry Regiment. During the 1953 Ceylonese Hartal, Captain Jayaweera led the B Company in suppressing the rioters in Moratuwa. In 1958, Major Jayaweera as second in command of the 1st Battalion, Ceylon Light Infantry took over as a commander Zone II, Task Force Anti Illicit Immigration. He succeeded Colonel Richard Udugama as the commanding officer of the 1st Battalion, Ceylon Light Infantry on 1 January 1962, serving till 4 November 1965. He succeeded Colonel Sepala Attygalle as commander of the Task Force Anti Illicit Immigration from 1965 to 1966. He was appointed Chief of Staff of the army in February 1969 and served till 1 February 1974, during the 1971 Insurrection.

For wartime service in World War II, he had earned the Defence Medal (United Kingdom) and the War Medal 1939–1945, and for service in the Ceylon Army, he received the Ceylon Armed Services Long Service Medal, Queen Elizabeth II Coronation Medal, Republic of Sri Lanka Armed Services Medal and the Ceylon Armed Services Inauguration Medal.

Following his retirement he was a director of Autodrome Pvt Ltd.
