= Overall Operational Command =

Command in the Sri Lankan military

Agency overview
- Formed: April 29, 2019; 6 years ago
- Headquarters: Security Forces Headquarters – West
- Agency executives: Major General Sathyapriya Liyanage, Overall Operational Commander; Rear Admiral W.A.S.S Perera, Operational Coordinating Officer; Air Vice Marshal W.L.R.P Rodrigo, Operational Coordinating Officer; Superintendent of Police L.K.D Anil Priyantha, Operational Coordinating Officer
- Parent department: Chief of the Defence Staff

The Overall Operational Command (OOC) was established on 29 April 2019 following the Easter Sunday Bombings bringing under its command all Sri Lanka Army, Sri Lanka Navy, Sri Lanka Air Force and Sri Lanka Police units within the Western Province and Puttalam District. The OOC comes under the Chief of Defence Staff.

Major General Sathyapriya Liyanage Commander, Security Forces - West was appointed the first Overall Operational Commander, with Rear Admiral W.A.S.S Perera, Air Vice Marshal W.L.R.P Rodrigo and Superintendent of Police L.K.D Anil Priyantha serving as service coordinating officers.

== See also ==
- Overall Operational Commander
