= Sri Lanka Navy 50th Anniversary Medal =

- Medal, obverse
- Type: Anniversary medal
- Awarded for: Service
- Description: Suspended from a plain suspension bar
- Presented by: Sri Lanka
- Eligibility: All ranks of the Sri Lanka Navy
- Clasps: None
- Status: No longer awarded
- Established: 2000
- First award: 2000
- Final award: 2000
- Ribbon bar

Precedence
- Next (higher): Sri Lanka Army 25th Anniversary Medal; Sri Lanka Navy 25th Anniversary Medal; Sri Lanka Air Force 25th Anniversary Medal
- Equivalent: Sri Lanka Army 50th Anniversary Medal; Sri Lanka Air Force 50th Anniversary Medal
- Next (lower): Queen Elizabeth II Coronation Medal

The Sri Lanka Navy 50th Anniversary Medal (Sinhala: ශ්‍රී ලංකා නාවික හමුදා 50වන සංවත්සර පදක්කම Śrī Laṃkā nāvika hamudā panasvana sangwathsara padakkama) was presented to all ranks of the regular and volunteer servicepersons of the Sri Lanka Navy provided they have completed a minimum of ten years in service at any time during the period of 9 December 1999 to 8 December 2000, the year of the 50th anniversary of the Navy.
