= Sri Lanka School of Military Engineering =

Sri Lanka School of Military Engineering is located at Embilipitiya, Sri Lanka. Established as the Ceylon School of Military Engineering in 1958 by the Ceylon Army it provides a wide range of training for the Sri Lanka Engineers including combat engineering, bomb disposal and heavy plant operations.

== Training ==
- Field engineer courses I, II, III
- Bomb disposal course
- Heavy plant operators course I, II, III
- Assault pioneer course
- Watermanship course
- Recruit course
- Humanitarian demining training programme
- L/cpl to cpl promotion course
- Introduction to explosive course for navy
- Basic and Advanced CBRN Course to army and navy
