= Sri Lanka Navy 25th Anniversary Medal =

- Medal, obverse
- Type: Anniversary medal
- Awarded for: Service
- Description: Suspended from a plain suspension bar
- Presented by: Sri Lanka
- Eligibility: All ranks of the Sri Lanka Navy, both regular or volunteer, and civilians
- Clasps: None
- Status: No longer awarded
- Established: 1975
- First award: 1975
- Final award: 1975
- Ribbon bar

Precedence
- Next (higher): Republic of Sri Lanka Armed Services Medal
- Equivalent: Sri Lanka Army 25th Anniversary Medal; Sri Lanka Air Force 25th Anniversary Medal
- Next (lower): Sri Lanka Army 50th Anniversary Medal; Sri Lanka Navy 50th Anniversary Medal; Sri Lanka Air Force 50th Anniversary Medal

The Sri Lanka Navy 25th Anniversary Medal (Sinhala: ශ්‍රී ලංකා නාවික හමුදා 25වන සංවත්සර පදක්කම Śrī Laṃkā nāvika hamudā visipasvana sangwathsara padakkama) was awarded to all ranks of both the regular- and volunteer forces of the Sri Lanka Navy, as well as civilians employed within the Navy who have completed a minimum of ten years of service by any time point within the 9 December 1974 to 8 December 1975 period, the year of the 25th anniversary of the Navy.

== See also ==
- Sri Lanka Navy 50th Anniversary Medal
