= D. A. Priyantha Dissanayake =

Lieutenant Colonel D. A. Priyantha Dissanayake RSP USP
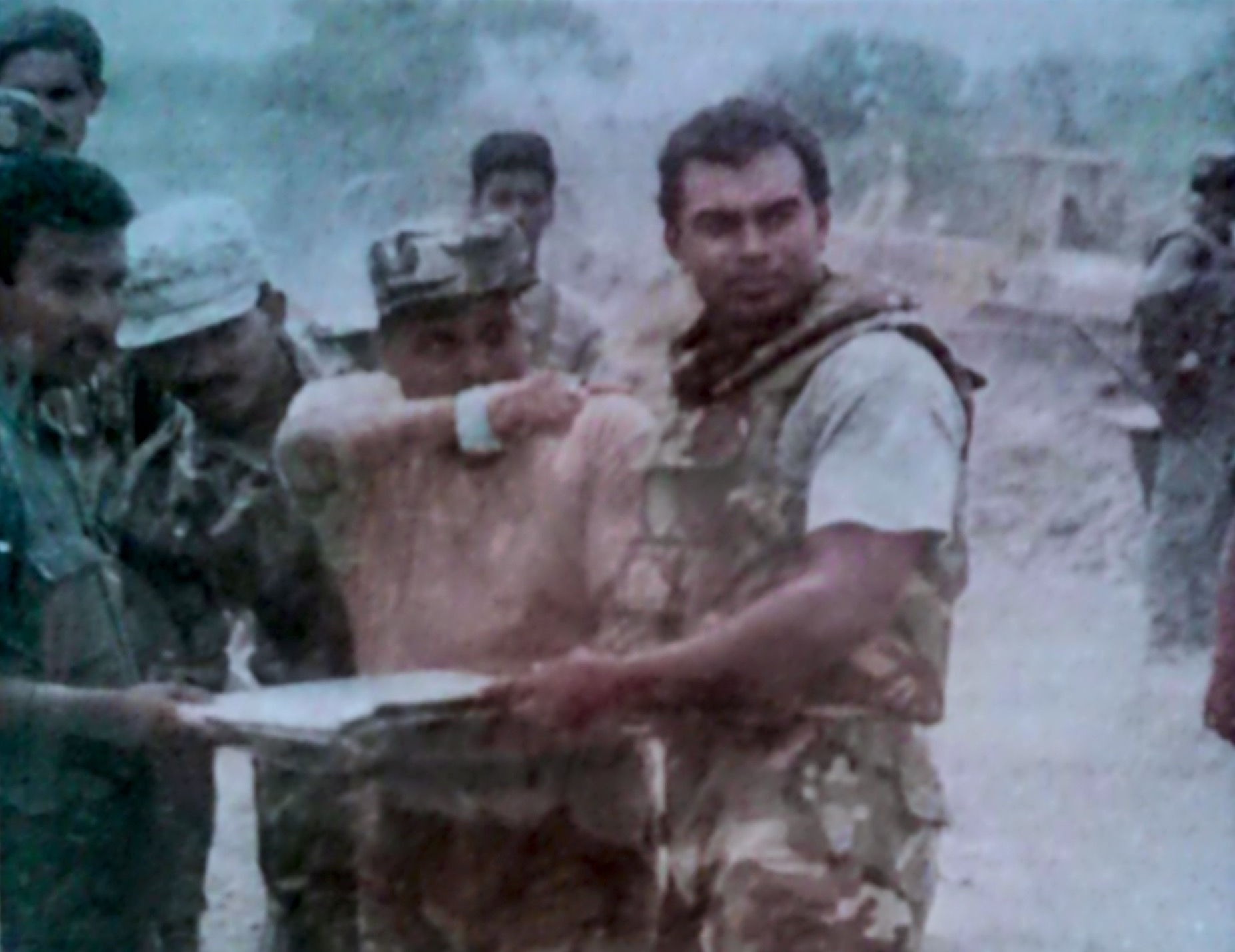
- DAP Dissanayake in the Kilinochchi area as Troop Commander in November 1996, in the aftermath of Operation Sath Jaya III during the Sath Jaya military campaign.
- Born: Colombo, Sri Lanka
- Military career
- Allegiance: Sri Lanka
- Branch: Sri Lanka Army
- Service years: 1983–2023
- Rank: Lieutenant Colonel
- Unit: Sri Lanka Engineers
- Conflicts: Sri Lankan Civil War
- Awards: RSP, USP

D. A. Priyantha Dissanayake is an officer of the Sri Lanka Army, with over 40 years of service. He is widely recognised for his contributions to both military operations and national infrastructure projects, including his service during the Sri Lankan Civil War and his leadership within the Sri Lanka Engineers Regiment.

== Military career ==
Dissanayake was commissioned into the Sri Lanka Engineers Regiment in 1983 and became a Troop Commander in 1995. His military service was marked by his active involvement in operations to counter insurgencies, particularly in the north and east of Sri Lanka during the Sri Lankan Civil War.

=== Key positions ===
- Troop Commander, 1st Field Engineer Regiment in Jaffna (1995–1997)
- Troop Commander, 5th Field Engineer Regiment in Jaffna(1997–2002)
- Adjutant, Plant Workshop in Mattegoda (2002–2004)
- Officer Commanding, Plant Squadron of the 7th Field Engineer Regiment in Minneriya (2008–2009)
- Second in Command, 7th Field Engineer Regiment in Sampur (2009–2010)
- Second in Command, 9th Field Engineer Regiment in Boo Oya (2011–2012)
- Commanding Officer, 11th Field Engineers in Mullaittivu (2015–2023)

Throughout his career, Dissanayake played a key role in major military operations, infrastructure development, and peacekeeping missions. His leadership during pivotal moments in the war and his oversight of critical projects in war-torn regions exemplified his commitment to national defense and recovery. He is renowned for volunteering to dismantle an explosive device placed under a bridge by the LTTE during Operation Sath Jaya, an act that saved numerous lives. In recognition of his bravery and leadership, Dissanayake was awarded the Rana Sura Padakkama (RSP) for acts of bravery in combat and the Uttama Seva Padakkama (USP) for distinguished service to the nation.

== Contributions to national infrastructure and peacekeeping ==
In addition to his battlefield contributions, Dissanayake was instrumental in several national infrastructure projects. He supervised the construction of key roads, including the Somawathiya-Seruwavila road and the Trincomalee Outer Circle Road, which played a crucial role in post-war reconstruction and economic development. His work on the Piduruthalagala Transmission Tower road and projects in the Puttalam and Mannar regions further highlighted his contributions beyond the military sphere. During his final years of service, he constructed several water reservoirs and dams, which were indispensable for supporting fauna, flora, and agriculture in the dry regions of the country. In 2012, Dissanayake also served in international peacekeeping operations under the guidance of the United Nations, where he oversaw the maintenance of an airfield in Chad during his deployment to the Central African Republic as part of a UN mission.

== Post-military career ==
Following his retirement from the military in 2023, Dissanayake continues to contribute to national development, through his work with the Land Reclamation and Development Company. As a project manager, he oversaw several important projects, including the expansion of the Bandaranaike International Airport and the construction of the German-Sri Lanka Friendship Maternity Hospital in Karapitiya.

== Awards and decorations ==
- Rana Sura Padakkama (RSP) – Awarded for bravery during military operations.
- Uttama Seva Padakkama (USP) – Awarded for distinguished service to the nation.
- The Board of the Sri Sambuddha Sasanaya Foundation awarded him twice with a token of appreciation 'for his contribution and dedication to promoting peace and the propagation of Buddhist principles through these meritorious acts'.

== Gallery ==
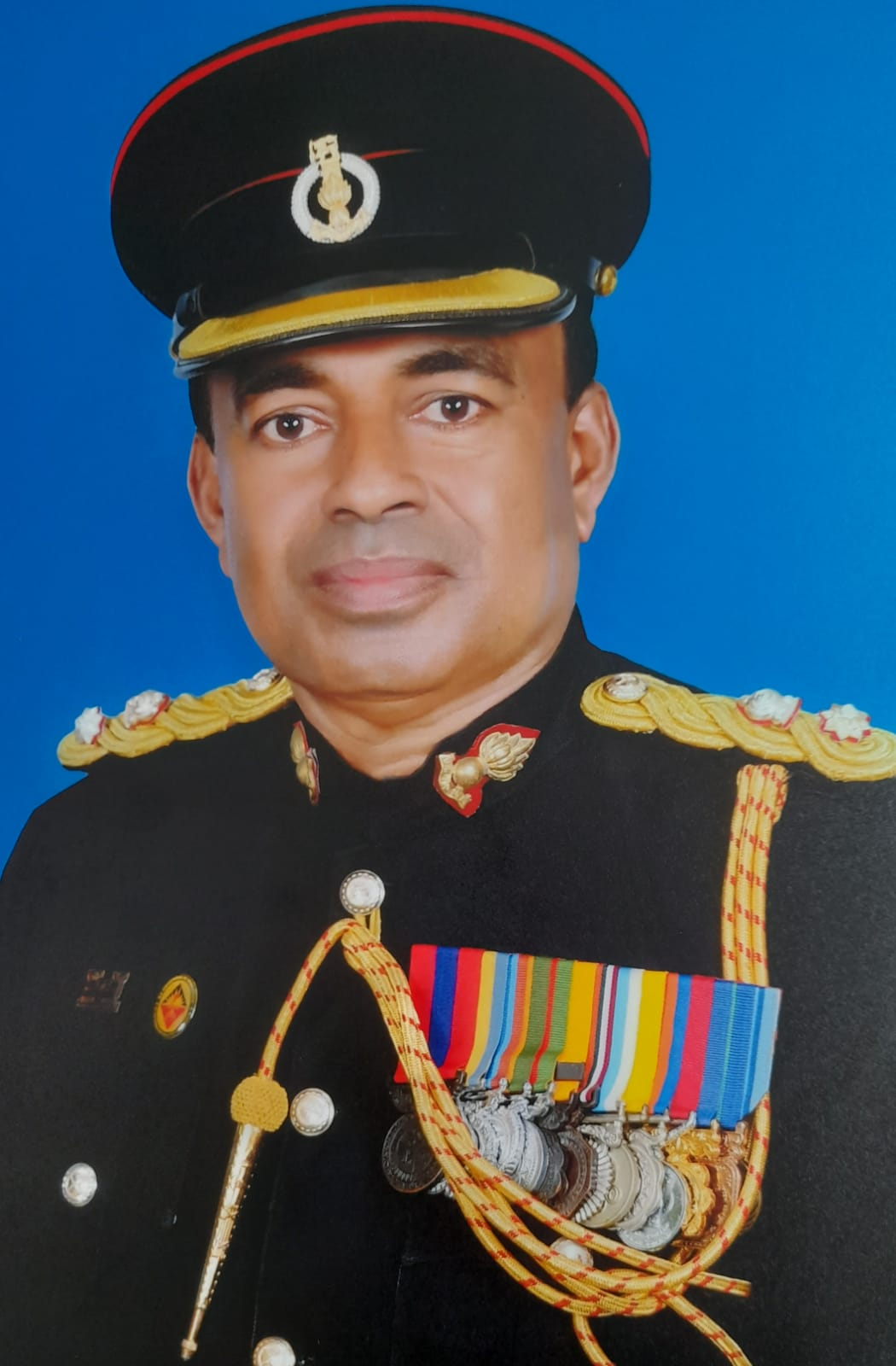
Lieutenant Colonel DAP Dissanayake.

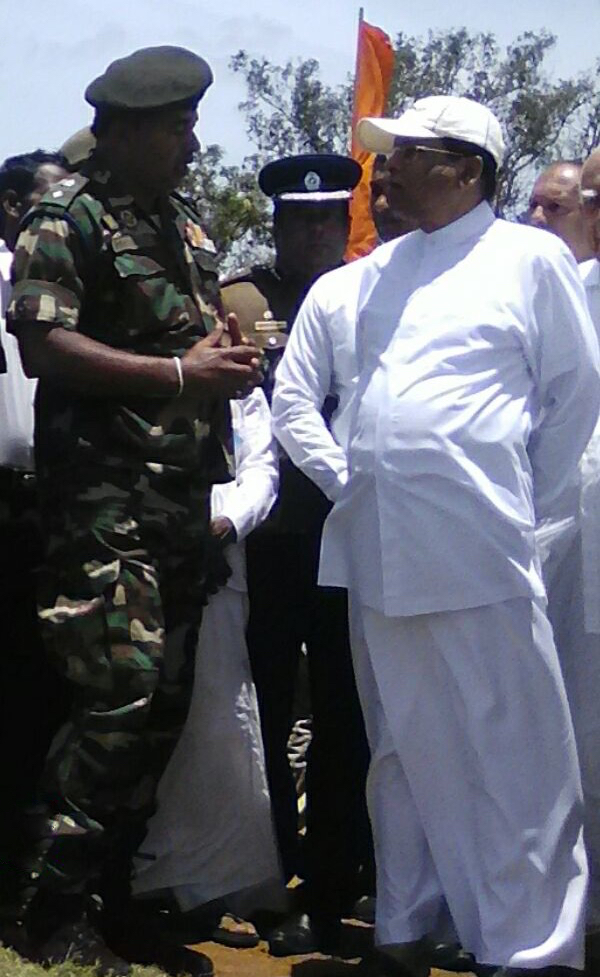
Lieutenant Colonel DAP Dissanayake and President Sirisena in 2018.

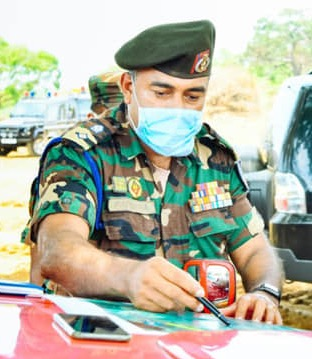
Lieutenant Colonel DAP Dissanayake in his role as Commanding Officer, 11th Field Engineers, Mullaittivu during the COVID-19 Pandemic.

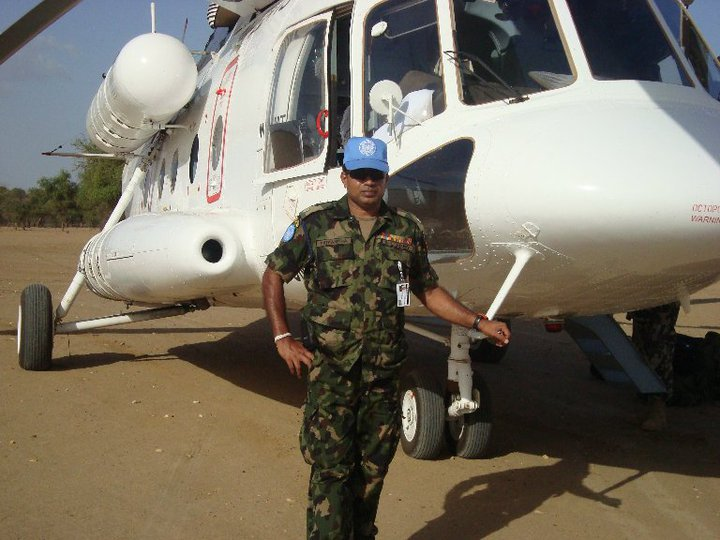
Lieutenant Colonel D. A. Priyantha Dissanayake in Chad 2012, during a UN operation to construct and maintain an airport.

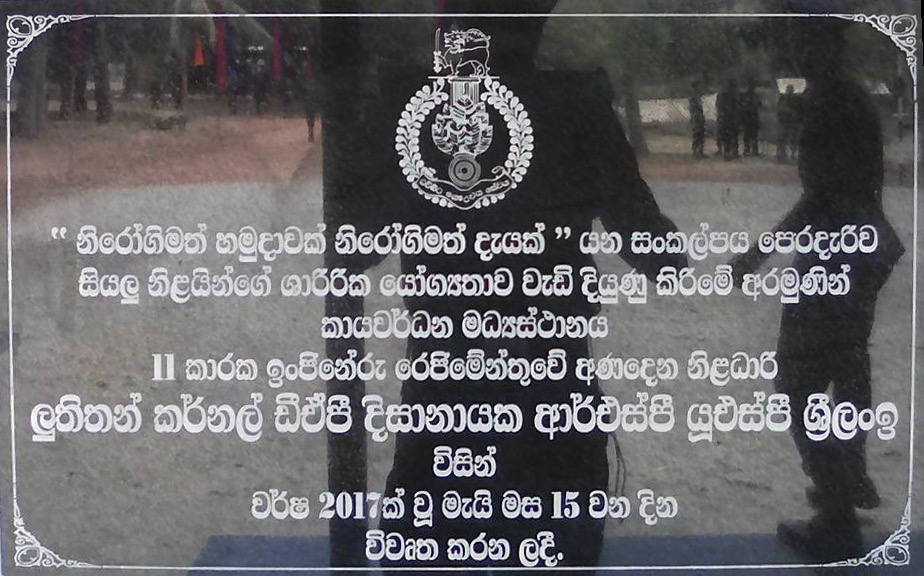
Inauguration plaque for the Second Phase of the National Road Development Project, led by Lieutenant Colonel D. A. Priyantha Dissanayake and the Sri Lankan Engineers Regiment, opened on March 15, 2017.

== See also ==
- Sri Lankan Civil War
- Sri Lanka Engineers
