= Sri Lanka Air Force 25th Anniversary Medal =

- Type: Anniversary medal
- Awarded for: Service
- Description: Suspended from a plain suspension bar
- Presented by: Sri Lanka
- Eligibility: All ranks of the Sri Lanka Air Force, both regular or volunteer, and civilians
- Clasps: None
- Status: No longer awarded
- Established: 1976
- First award: 1976
- Final award: 1976
- Ribbon bar

Precedence
- Next (higher): Republic of Sri Lanka Armed Services Medal
- Equivalent: Sri Lanka Army 25th Anniversary Medal; Sri Lanka Navy 25th Anniversary Medal
- Next (lower): Sri Lanka Army 50th Anniversary Medal; Sri Lanka Navy 50th Anniversary Medal; Sri Lanka Air Force 50th Anniversary Medal

The Sri Lanka Air Force 25th Anniversary Medal (Sinhala: ශ්‍රී ලංකා ගුවන් හමුදා 25වන සංවත්සර පදක්කම Śrī Laṃkā guwan hamudā visipasvana sangwathsara padakkama) was awarded to all ranks of both the regular- and volunteer forces of the Sri Lanka Air Force, as well as civilians employed within the SLAF who were in service on the 2 March 1976, the date of the 25th anniversary of the SLAF.
