= Moyenneville, Pas-de-Calais =

Moyenneville
- Commune
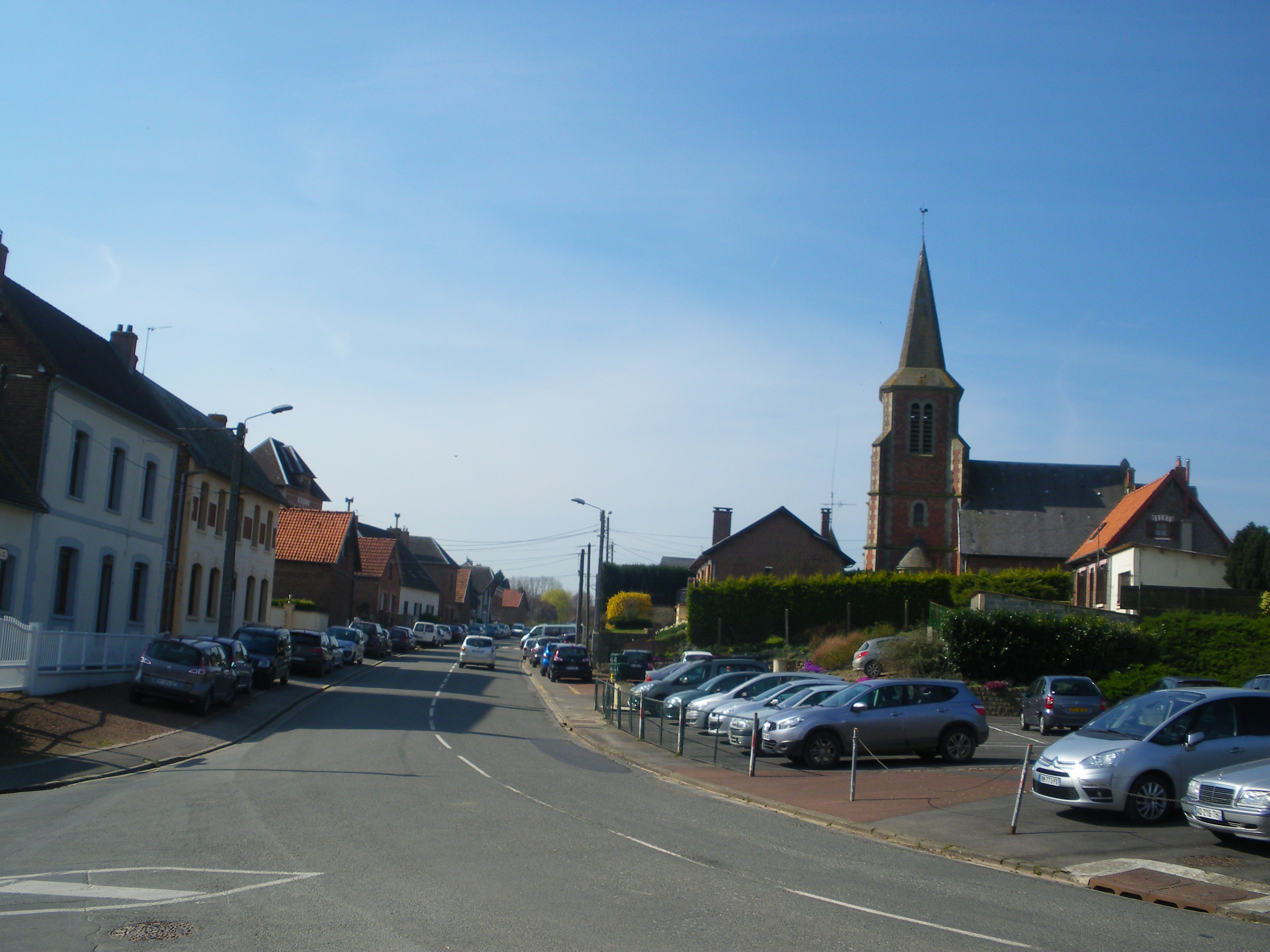
- A general view of Moyenneville

- Coat of arms
- Location of Moyenneville
- Location within France Location within Hauts-de-France
- Coordinates: 50°10′56″N 2°46′45″E
- Country: France
- Region: Hauts-de-France
- Department: Pas-de-Calais
- Arrondissement: Arras
- Canton: Bapaume
- Intercommunality: CC Sud-Artois

Government
  - Mayor (2020–2026): François Caron
- Area^{1}: 6.48 km^{2} (2.50 sq mi)
- Elevation: 100 m (330 ft)
- Highest elevation: 128 m (420 ft)
- Lowest elevation: 91 m (299 ft)
- Population (2023): 289
  - Density: 44.6/km^{2} (116/sq mi)
- Time zone: UTC+01:00 (CET)
  - Summer (DST): UTC+02:00 (CEST)
- INSEE/Postal code: 62597 /62121
- ^{1} French Land Register data, which excludes lakes, ponds, glaciers > 1 km^{2} (0.386 sq mi or 247 acres) and river estuaries.

Moyenneville (French pronunciation: [mwajɛnvil]) is a commune in the Pas-de-Calais department in the Hauts-de-France region of France.

== Geography ==
Moyenneville is situated 8 miles (13 km) south of Arras, at the junction of the D32 and C4 roads.

== Population ==
Historical population
Year	Pop.	±% p.a.
1968	276	—
1975	253	−1.24%
1982	285	+1.72%
1990	289	+0.17%
1999	298	+0.34%
2007	281	−0.73%
2012	284	+0.21%
2017	272	−0.86%
2023	289	+1.02%
Source: INSEE

== See also ==
- Communes of the Pas-de-Calais department
