= Rajeewa Jayaweera =

Sri Lankan newspaper columnist

- Born: Colombo, Sri Lanka
- Died: 11 June 2020; Colombo, Sri Lanka
- Education: Nalanda College, Colombo; School of Economics for Catering and Trade Dortmund, West Germany
- Known for: Newspaper Columnist
- Relatives: Stanley Jayaweera (Father) Neville Jayaweera (Uncle)

Rajeewa Jayaweera (also known as Rajiv Jayaweera) was a Sri Lankan newspaper columnist.

== Biography ==
He was the son of diplomat, Stanley Jayaweera, and the nephew of Neville Jayaweera. Rajeewa was educated at Nalanda College, Colombo. Rajeewa graduated from the School of Economics for Catering and Trade in Dortmund, West Germany. He was a Senior Executive of SriLankan Airlines.

Rajeewa was also the Regional Manager for Qatar Airways.
