= Sri Lanka Engineers =

Sri Lanka Army's Engineers Corps

- Active: 1911 – Present
- Country: Sri Lanka
- Branch: Sri Lanka Army
- Type: Engineering Regiment
- Role: Military engineering, Combat engineering
- Size: 10 regular regiments, 1 volunteer regiment
- Regimental Centre: Panagoda Cantonment
- Nickname: SLE
- Motto: "Ubique" Latin – (Everywhere)
- Engagements: World War I World War II; 1971 Insurrection; Insurrection 1987-89; Sri Lankan Civil War
- Decorations: 1 Weerodara Vibhushanaya, 2 Weera Wickrama Vibhushanaya

Commanders
- Chief Field Engineer: Major General MK Jayawardena RSP USP ndu
- Colonel-Commandant: Major General MK Jayawardena RSP USP ndu
- Notable commanders: General Denis Perera VSV; Brigadier P. D. Ramayanayake

The Corp of Sri Lanka Engineers (SLE) is a combat support arm of the Sri Lanka Army which provides military engineering. It is made up of ten regular regiments and one volunteer regiment. Headquartered at Panagoda Cantonment, it is headed by the Centre Commandant.

The corps provides combat engineering, construction and other technical support to the Sri Lankan Army and civil authorities. The corps' key roles are mobility and counter mobility. That is providing mobility to friendly forces while denying movement to enemy forces. Engineers are able to conduct tasks including penetrating minefields, locating and disarming booby traps, purifying water and building roads and bridges to maintain lines of communications.

== History ==
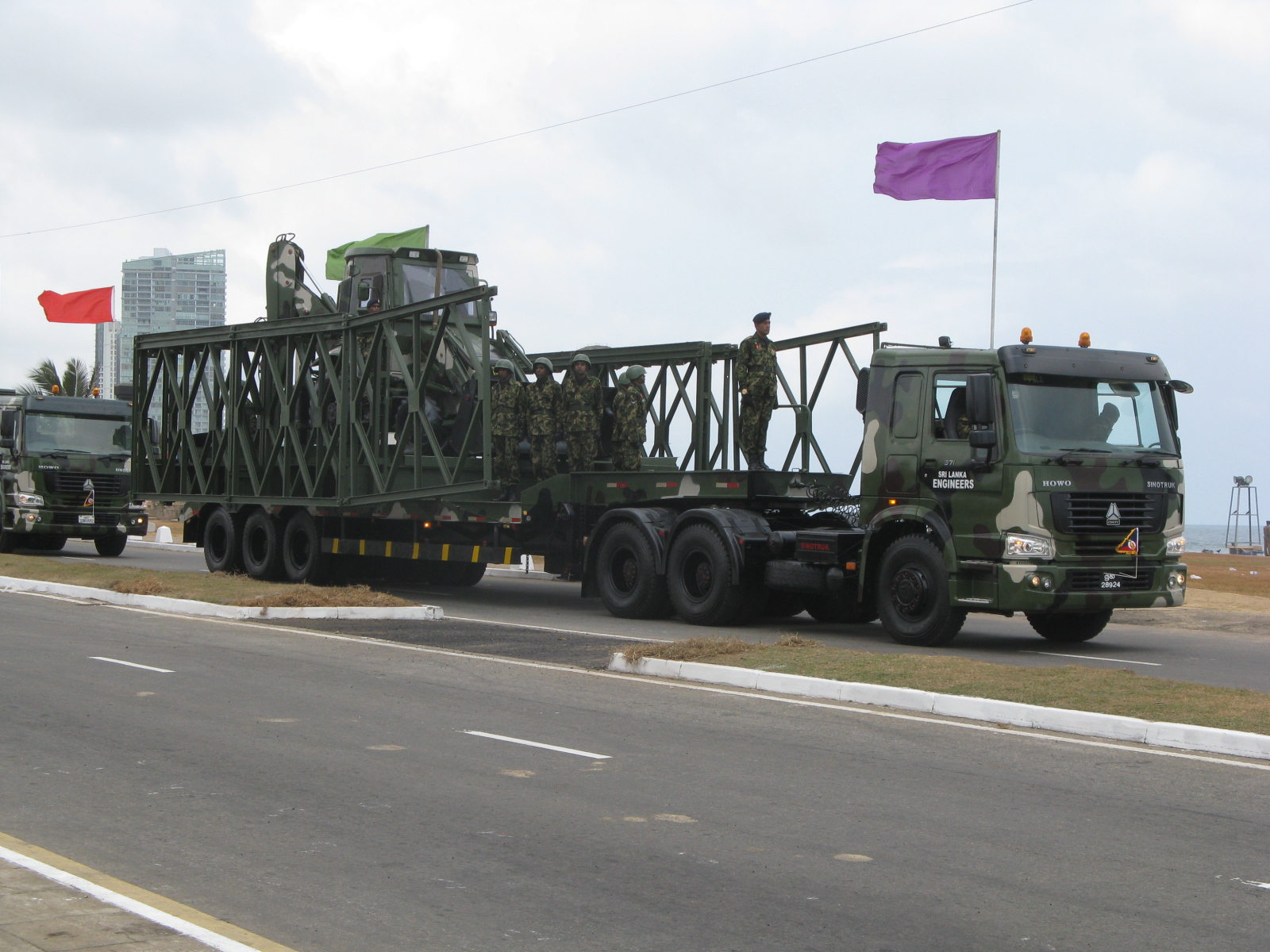
SLE Demining Unit on Victory Day Parade

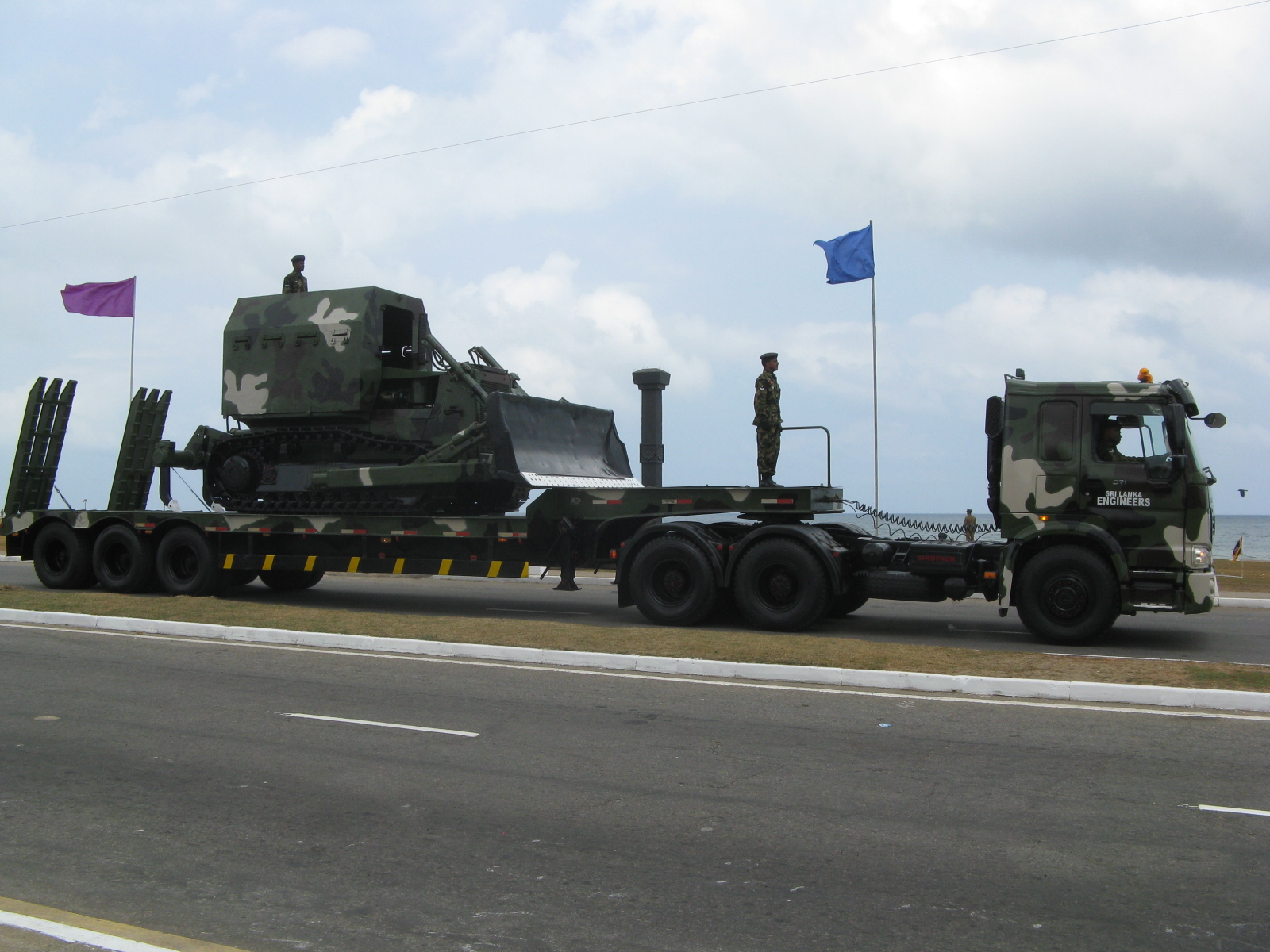
SLE Military Bulldozer

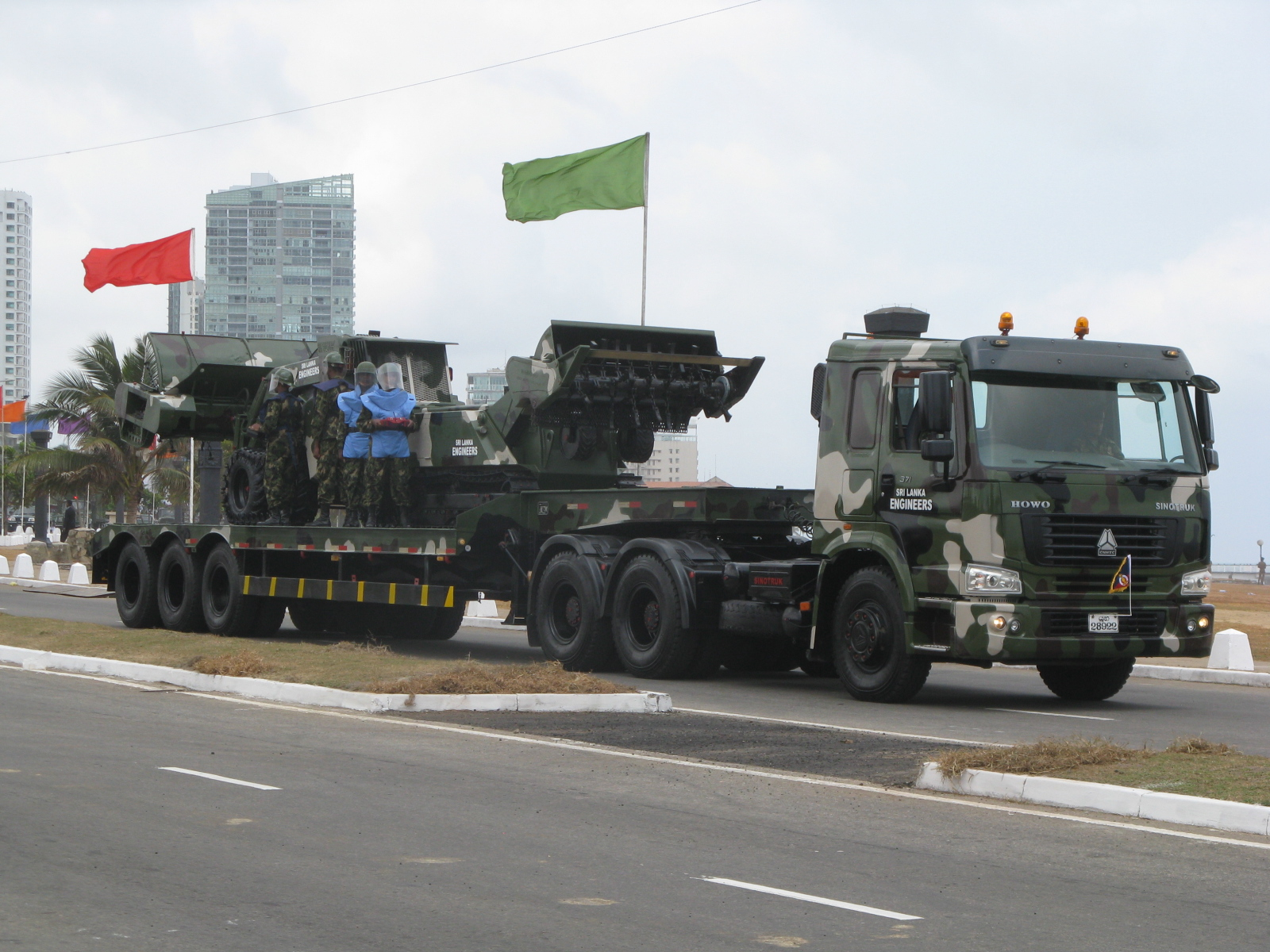
SLE Demining Unit on Victory Day Parade

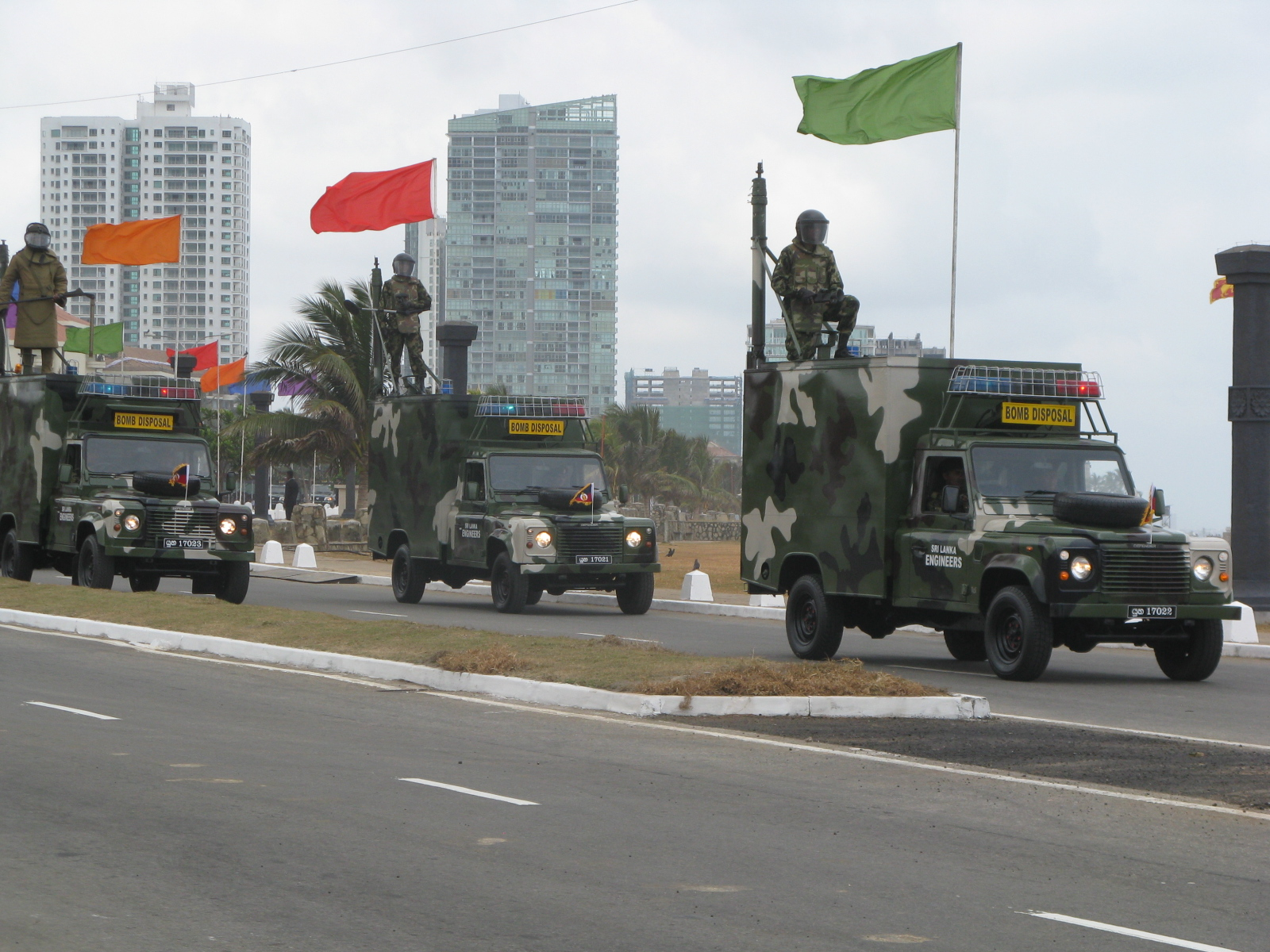
SLE Bomb Disposal Unit on Victory Day Parade

=== Formation and World Wars ===
The Ceylon Engineers was formed in 1911 as part of the Ceylon Defence Force, following the transfer of Royal Engineers units from Ceylon. Duties of this unit were to the coastal searchlight and signal works. The unit was made up only of Europeans at its inception, mostly volunteers who had transferred from the Ceylon Planters Rifle Corps. Its first commanding officer was Captain T. H. Chapman who held the post of Director of Public Works in government service. The Ceylon Engineers were mobilized during World War I and demobilized at its conclusion.

After the war, the Commander of the Ceylon Defence Force, in consultation with the GOC Ceylon, recommended that the members of the Burgher community who were enlisted to the Colombo Town Guard be invited to replace the Ceylon Engineers which was to be disbanded by 31 December 1926. This proposal was accepted and the reconstituted Ceylon Engineer Corps was raised on 1 January 1927. Personnel for the reconstituted unit were individually re-enlisted and a strength of 11 officers and 144 Other Ranks was recorded. This attracted the attention of two prominent members of the Legislative Council, D. S. Senanayake and E. W. Perera, who raised the question as to why there should be racial military units in the Island. In 1928 the Committee set up by the Governor of Ceylon to inquire into this question, proposed in their report that the Ceylon Engineer Corps shall comprise British subjects of good character and respectability. From then onwards, the Ceylon Engineer Corps was open to all Ceylonese. The Corps was to comprise two Companies of Field Engineers (for combat engineering), two Companies of Fortress Engineers (to man defence lights and engines) and one Company of Signalers. In 1939 the Corps was mobilized for World War II and in 1943 a second signal company was raised. These formed Ceylon Signals Corps.

=== Post Independence ===
With the establishment of the Ceylon Army after independence, the 1st Field Squadron was formed in 1951 under the command of Major (later Brigadier) Douglas Ramanayake. This became the core of a new Ceylon Engineers which was formed in 1957, with the regimental headquarters permanently located at the Panagoda Cantonment. A military engineering unit was set up in May 1958 at Konduwattuan Camp in Ampara, this school was moved several times before been located at Thunkama in Embilipitiya where it is today. In 1959, the 1st Field Engineer Squadron became the 1st Field Engineer Regiment. The Volunteer counterpart of the ‘Sappers', the 4th Development and Construction Engineers Regiment was raised in 1964, replacing 2nd (V) Field/Plant Regiment, which was disbanded in 1962 after the attempted military coup that year which involved some of its officers.

In the recent years, the Corps of Sri Lanka Engineers have been deployed in many parts of the country in support of military operations against terrorists. Since its conception in 1951 the corps has taken part in many development projects carried out in Sri Lanka by the government and has assisted during several natural disasters.

== Units ==
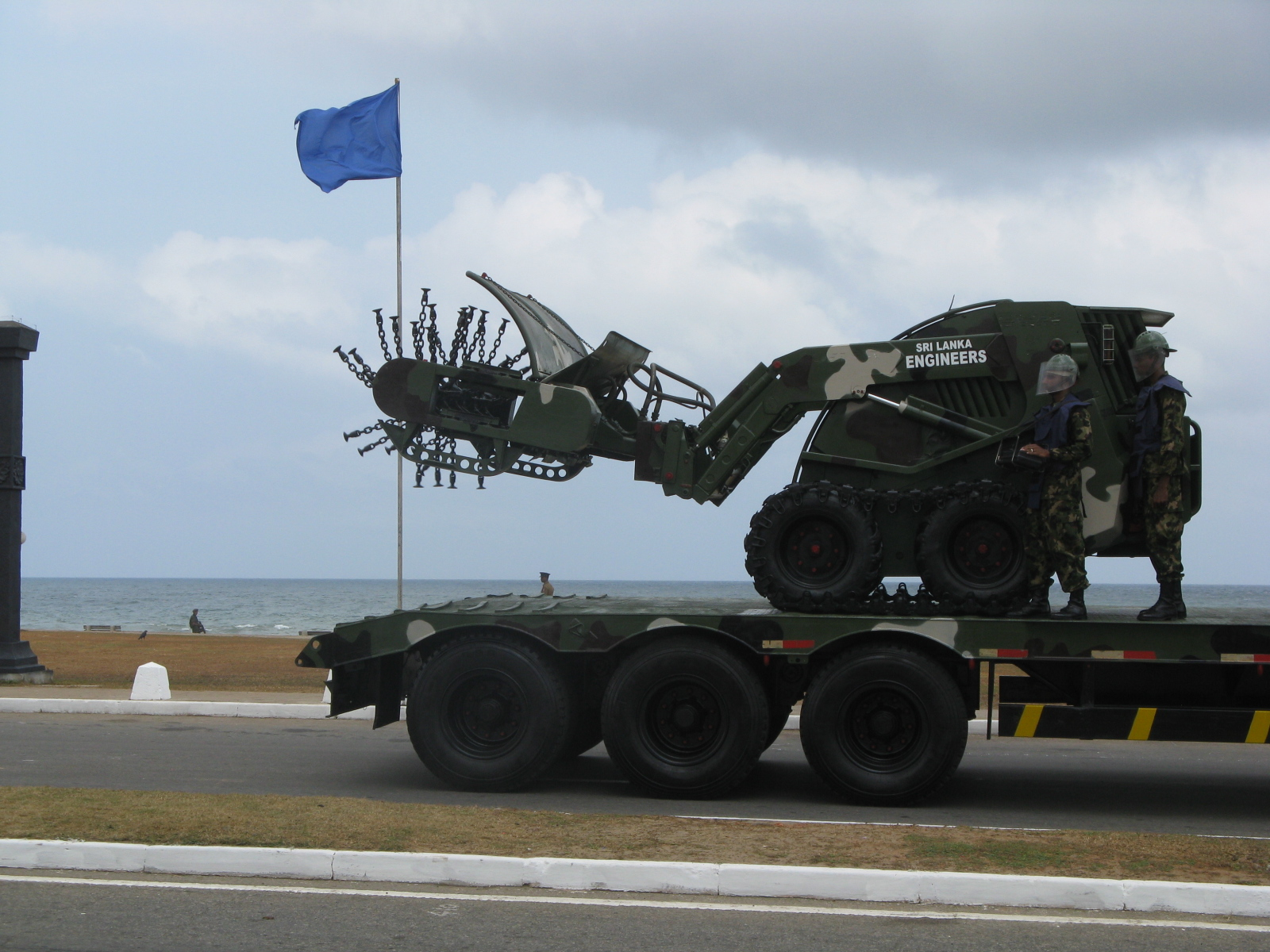
Sri Lanka Engineers Demining Unit

=== Formations ===
- Engineering Division
  - Field Engineer Brigade
  - Plant Engineer Brigade
  - General Engineering Brigade

=== Regular Army ===
- 1st Field Engineer Regiment
- 5th Field Engineer Regiment SLE
- 6th Field Engineer Regiment SLE
- 7th Field Engineer Regiment SLE
- 8th Field Engineer Regiment SLE
- 9th Field Engineer Regiment SLE
- 10th Field Engineer Regiment SLE
- 11th Field Engineer Regiment SLE
- 14 CBRN Regiment SLE
- 16 Workshop Regiment

=== Volunteer Regiments ===
- 4th[Sri Lanka Army Volunteer Force|Volunteer])Engineer Regiment SLE (Formed on 1 September 1964)

== Recipients of the Weerodara Vibhushanaya ==
- Colonel C. D. Wickramanayake

== Notable members ==
- Lieutenant Basil Arthur Horsfall VC † – Only Ceylonese recipient of the Victoria Cross
- Brigadier Douglas Ramanayake – founder of the Sri Lanka Engineers
- General Denis Perera VSV, ndc, psc, SLE – Former Commander of the Army (1977–1981).
- General Nalin Seneviratne, VSV, ndc, SLE – Former Commander of the Army (1985–1988)
- General Crishantha de Silva, RWP, USP, ndc, psc, SLE – Chief of the Defence Staff and Commander of the Army (2015–2017)
- General Mahesh Senanayake, RWP, RSP, USP, psc – Commander of the Army
- Lieutenant General Nalin Angammana † – Former GOC, 3rd Division.
- Major General Mendaka Samarasinghe, RWP, RSP, USP, ndc, psc, SLE – former Chief of Staff of the Sri Lanka Army (2009–2010)
- Major General J. R. S. de Silva, RSP, VSV, USP, SLE – Chief of Staff of the Sri Lanka Army (1991–1992)
- Major General K. J. C. Perera, RWP, RSP, VSV, USP, rcds, psc, SLE – Chief of Staff of the Sri Lanka Army (2000–2001)
- Major General E. H. Samaratunga USP, SLE
- Major General A. E. D. Wijendra RSP, USP, ndc, psc, SLE
- Major General M. D. S. Chandrapala RWP, RSP, USP, psc, SLE
- Major General D. S. K. Wijesooriya RWP, RSP, USP, psc, SLE
- Major General J. K. N. Jayakody USP, ndc, SLE
- Major Genera V N Wijegunawardena
- Major General Janaka Walgama RSP VSV USP ndu psc
- Lieutenant Colonel J.H.V. de Alwis – former Commanding Officer, 2nd Volunteer Engineers, Ceylon Engineers & accused conspirator in the 1962 coup d'état attempt
- Lieutenant Colonel D. A. Priyantha Dissanayake RSP, USP
- Brigadier S.A.R. Samarasinghe RSP USP – Centre Commandant (2008–2010), Brigade Commander 592 Brigade (2011–2013)

== Alliances ==
- United Kingdom – Corps of Royal Engineers
- India – Indian Engineers

== Order of precedence ==
Preceded by Sri Lanka Artillery	Order of Precedence	Succeeded by Sri Lanka Signals Corps

== See also ==
- Sri Lanka Army

== External links and sources ==
- Sri Lanka Army
- Sri Lanka Engineers
- The fifty-year march of the Sri Lanka Army Engineers
- Brigadier Percy Douglas Ramanayake, An officer and gentleman par excellence, by General Desamanya Denis Perera
