= Prevention of Terrorism Act (Sri Lanka) =

Sri Lankan law

The Prevention of Terrorism Act of 1978 is a law in Sri Lanka. It provides the police with broad powers to search, arrest, and detain suspects. It was first enacted as a temporary law in 1979 under J. R. Jayewardene presidency, then made permanent in 1982.

== Elements of the Act ==
Under the PTA of Sri Lanka, a person can be detained for periods up to 18 months (renewable by order every three months amended as 12 months in 2022) if the Minister has reason to believe or suspect that any person is connected with or concerned in any unlawful activity.

Offences not known to ordinary laws of the country were also introduced. For example, if a person knows the whereabouts of terrorist (“terrorist” not defined in the Act) and if such person fails to inform the police, he commits an offence punishable with a minimum 5-year jail term. If the terrorist stays with any person for a night such person is guilty of harbouring, punishable with a maximum of twenty years' jail.

== Notable Cases ==
Poet Ahnaf Jazeem was arrested in May 2020 under the PTA. His arrest received attention from international human rights organizations and was ruled to be in violation of international law by the Working Group on Arbitrary Detention.

== See also ==
- Terrorism in Sri Lanka
