= Silavathurai =

- Town
- Location within Northern Province
- Coordinates: 8°50′13″N 79°58′8″E
- Country: Sri Lanka
- Province: Northern
- District: Mannar
- DS Division: Musali

Silavathurai (Tamil: சிலாவத்துறை) is a small town in Sri Lanka. It is located within Northern Province.
