= Neville Jayaweera =

Sri Lankan civil servant (1930–2020)

- Born: 23 October 1930; Colombo, Sri Lanka
- Died: 10 May 2020 (aged 89); Kent, England
- Occupations: Chairman and Director-General of Ceylon Broadcasting Corporation
- Employer: The Government of Sri Lanka
- Known for: Spearheading the switch from Radio Ceylon to a public corporation 1966-1970. Providing a framework of values for broadcasting, enforcing professional broadcasting standards, and maintaining discipline in the work place.
- Term: 1967-1970
- Relatives: Stanley Jayaweera; Rajeewa Jayaweera

Neville Jayaweera (23 October 1930 - 10 May 2020) was a member of the Ceylon Civil Service (1955-1972). He was handpicked by the Prime Minister of Ceylon, Dudley Senanayake, to be both Chairman and Director-General of the Ceylon Broadcasting Corporation (CBC) in 1967. Jayaweera drafted the legislation for setting up the CBC and headed the new Corporation for three years. Under his leadership the Ceylon Broadcasting Corporation followed very strictly the values and ethics of public service broadcasting. The CBC is now known as the Sri Lanka Broadcasting Corporation.

== Early history ==
Neville Jayaweera was born to Robert and Constance Jayaweera in Colombo, Sri Lanka, on 23 October 1930; the third of four siblings – Stanley, Sheila and Beryl.

He had his secondary education at St Thomas's College, Mount Lavinia, and at St Peter's College, Colombo. He took an Honours Degree in Philosophy from the University of Ceylon in 1953 and passed into the Ceylon Civil Service in 1955.

In 1949, his brother Stanley had also taken an Honours Degree in Philosophy from the same university and in 1953 had passed into the Ceylon Foreign Service, within which he held several senior diplomatic positions and retired in 1988 as Sri Lanka's Ambassador to Germany.

At University, Jayaweera met Trixie Jayasekera, who was educated at Bishop's College, Colombo, and took a General Arts Degree from the University of Ceylon and worked for several years as a Library Assistant under the Bromley Council in Kent.

Neville Jayaweera and Trixie Jayasekera married in 1958 and had a daughter, Manohari (Mano), who married Edmund Glynn. Manohari died on 2 February 2017.

== Career ==
For a short period after graduating from the University of Ceylon Peradeniya in 1953, Jayaweera was an Assistant Lecturer in Philosophy at the University until he passed into the Civil Service in 1955.

Neville Jayaweera served in the Ceylon Civil Service (later renamed the Ceylon Administrative Service) between the ages of 25 and 42, i.e. from 1955 to 1972, before taking early retirement. During those 17 years, Jayaweera held several senior positions in the government.

Among the posts he held while serving the Sri Lankan Government between 1955 and 1972 were:

- Government Agent (GA - Head of Administration of the District) of the Administrative Districts of Badulla Jaffna, Trincomalee and Vavuniya
- Chairman and Director General of the Ceylon Broadcasting Corporation (CBC)

In 1974, accepting an invitation from the World Association of Christian Communication (WACC) in London to work as their Director of Research and Planning, Jayaweera relocated to London with his wife Trixie and daughter Mano and served in that capacity till 1989.

He resigned from the WACC in 1989, and resumed his career with the Government of Sri Lanka in 1990, serving as:

- Media Adviser to The President of Sri Lanka, His Excellency Ranasinghe Premadasa (1990-1991)
- Sri Lanka's Ambassador to the Scandinavian countries, Sweden, Norway, Denmark and Finland (1991-1994)

In addition to his formal employment, Jayaweera held a number of other positions between 1975 and 1991, including:

- Member of the BBC's Central Religious Advisory Committee (CRAC) London (1976-1983)
- Trustee of the International Broadcasting Institute, later renamed International Institute of Communication London (1975-1983)
- Member of the Board of Governors, Worldview International Foundation (WIF) Colombo (1980-1991)
- Between 1980 and 1989 Jayaweera was the WACC's permanent representation to UNESCO as well as to the ITU in Geneva.

During 1975 and 1989 Jayaweera travelled the globe lecturing on New Communication Technologies and the Communication Revolution, subjects on which he has written extensively.

Jayaweera has also written extensively on Sri Lanka's ethnic conflict and on spiritual matters.

After his final retirement in 1994, Jayaweera settled down with his wife Trixie in a village in Kent, UK, where he led a contemplative life, meditating, praying and writing on spiritual subjects.

== Publications ==
- Folk media and development communication - myths and realities : a report on experiences in people's communication in Mexico, India, and the Philippines Neville Jayaweera. Published in 1991, Asian Social Institute (Manila)
- Some reflections on the theme of continuity and change in Indian culture by Neville Jayaweera
- The role of the churches in the ethnic conflict Neville Jayaweera, Marga Institute, 2001
- The New Economics of Information Stonier, Tom., Neville Jayaweera, James Robertson, Intermediate Technology, November 1989 Paperback
- Jaffna: Exorcising the Past and Holding the Vision. An autobiographical reflection on the ethnic conflict by Neville Jayaweera, Government Agent of Jaffna 1963-1966. Published in 2014, Ravaya Publishers, Sri Lanka. (Awarded the prize for best memoirs in 2014 - the Sri Lanka Cultural Ministry)
- The Vavuniya Diaries (Recollecting the first JVP uprising 1971) Neville Jayaweera, Government Agent of Vavuniya Administrative District (1970-1973). Ravaya Publishers, Sri Lanka. 2017

Chairman and Director General of the CBC Neville Jayaweera with the Prime Minister of Ceylon, Dudley Senanayake.

== See also ==
- List of Sri Lankan non-career diplomats
- Sri Lanka Broadcasting Corporation
- Radio Ceylon
