= Sri Lanka Army 25th Anniversary Medal =

- Type: Anniversary medal
- Awarded for: Service
- Description: Suspended from a plain suspension bar
- Presented by: Sri Lanka
- Eligibility: All ranks of the Sri Lanka Army
- Clasps: None
- Status: No longer awarded
- Established: 1974
- First award: 1974
- Final award: 1974
- Ribbon bar

Precedence
- Next (higher): Republic of Sri Lanka Armed Services Medal
- Equivalent: Sri Lanka Navy 25th Anniversary Medal; Sri Lanka Air Force 25th Anniversary Medal
- Next (lower): Sri Lanka Army 50th Anniversary Medal; Sri Lanka Navy 50th Anniversary Medal; Sri Lanka Air Force 50th Anniversary Medal

The Sri Lanka Army 25th Anniversary Medal (Sinhala: ශ්‍රී ලංකා යුද්ධ හමුදා 25වන සංවත්සර පදක්කම Śrī Laṃkā yuddha hamudā visipasvana sangwathsara padakkama) was presented to all ranks of the regular and volunteer servicepersons of the Sri Lanka Army provided they have completed a minimum of ten years in service by October 8, 1974, the year of the 25th anniversary of the Ceylon Army.
