= Republic of Sri Lanka Armed Services Medal =

- Medal, obverse
- Type: Commemorative medal
- Awarded for: Service during the formation of the Republic of Sri Lanka
- Description: Suspended from a plain suspension bar
- Presented by: Sri Lanka
- Eligibility: All regular and volunteer ranks of the Armed Services of the Republic of Sri Lanka
- Clasps: None
- Status: No longer awarded
- Established: 1981
- Ribbon bar

Precedence
- Next (higher): Videsha Seva Padakkama
- Next (lower): Sri Lanka Army 25th Anniversary Medal; Sri Lanka Navy 25th Anniversary Medal; Sri Lanka Air Force 25th Anniversary Medal

The Republic of Sri Lanka Armed Services Medal was awarded to members of the regular and volunteer forces of the Military of Sri Lanka who were in service on 22 May 1972, subject to recommendation by the commanders of the respective service commanders. Members of the then Ceylon Cadet Corps were ineligible. The award commemorated service at the time the country adopted a republican constitution, ceasing to be a Commonwealth realm.
