= Sri Lankan intelligence agencies =

The Government of Sri Lanka maintains intelligence agencies that conduct intelligence activities to support the national security of Sri Lanka. Their intelligence assessments contribute to the conduct of national security, military planning and law enforcement. The main organisations are the State Intelligence Service and the Directorate of Military Intelligence. These intelligence agencies are coordinated by the Chief of National Intelligence (CNI), who reports to the Secretary of Defense.

== Current agencies ==
- State Intelligence Service
- Sri Lanka Police
  - Special Branch
  - Criminal Investigation Department
  - Terrorist Investigation Division
  - Criminal Intelligence Analysis and Prevention Division
- Sri Lanka Army
  - Directorate of Military Intelligence
  - Military Intelligence Corps
  - Sri Lanka Signals Corps
- Sri Lanka Navy
  - Department of Naval Intelligence
- Sri Lanka Air Force
  - Directorate of Air Intelligence
- Central Bank of Sri Lanka
  - Financial Intelligence Unit (Sri Lanka),

== History ==
=== Colonial era ===
Formal intelligence gathering within the island started in the 19th century by the British colonial government of Ceylon with the enactment of the Police Ordinance No.16 of 1865 which gave the Ceylon Police Force provisions to "collect and communicate intelligence affecting the public peace". With the establishment of the Criminal Investigation Department (CID) within the Ceylon Police Force in 1870, intelligence gathering and investigations pertaining to internal security were undertaken by the CID.

=== World War II ===
In the 1920s, the Royal Corps of Signals established a SIGINT unit in Ceylon, this was followed by the Admiralty which established a direction finding station at Trincomalee. During the war SIGINT operations were carried out from sites in Colombo, Peradeniya, Trincomalee and Hambantota. HMS Anderson was established to operate Royal Navy code breakers that read Japanese naval signals, including the main Japanese fleet code IN25. It became one of three major allied SIGINT centers that worked on Japanese naval signals with the other two being United States Navy OP-20-G in Washington DC and the Fleet Radio Unit, Melbourne. HMS Anderson remained operational as a listening station after the war, moving to a new facility in Perkar north of Trincomalee until it was shut down in 1962 after it was handed over to the Royal Ceylon Navy.

=== Post independence ===
Following Ceylon's independence in 1948, the police department came under the Ministry of External Affairs and Defence and the CID continued its traditional role in domestic intelligence gathering as the security agency. A short lived Ministry of Internal Security was established by Prime Minister Wijeyananda Dahanayake operating from 1959 to 1960 following the Bandaranaike assassination. The police failed to detect the attempt military coup in 1962 until CID was notified in the eleventh-hour by one of the plotters, allowing CID and loyalist elements in the regular armed forces to prevent the coup from taking place. In 1966, the CID was able to detect another possible attempt coup. The Special Branch was created as part of the CID in 1966, however it was disbanded by Sirimavo Bandaranaike after she was elected as prime minister in 1970. Bandaranaike felt the Special Branch officers were loyal to the previous administration and deeply distrusted the military officers following her experience in 1962. She had a Field Security Detachment formed within the Ceylon Army tasked with internal security.

=== 1971 JVP Insurrection ===
Although CID investigations had taken place in to the Che Guevara clique and the arrest of JVP leader Rohana Wijeweera; the police failed to gauge scale and magnitude of the JVP insurrection which was launched in April 1971 taking the Bandaranaike government off-guard. In the months that followed, the government gained the assistance of British MI5 in counterinsurgency operations against the JVP. The police with the armed forces carried-out internal security operations to identify JVP carders and sympathizers in the community and within the government. Notable arrests included Captain Ravi Jayewardene, S. D. Bandaranayake and Susil Siriwardene. Following the JVP insurrection, the Police Department established the Intelligence Services Division at 10 Cambridge Place, Colombo 7 to create an intelligence staff and network within the island.

=== Tamil militancy ===
Following the assassination of Alfred Duraiappah on 27 July 1975, CID began gathering intelligence on Tamil militant groups with the formation of the CID TULF desk which lead to some of its members being massacred at Murunkan. Thereafter the Police Special Branch functioning under the Intelligence Services Division of the Sri Lanka Police, undertook national (local) intelligence functions.

=== Civil War ===
The perceived failure of the Intelligence Services Division during the riots of July 1983 led the J.R. Jayawardene government to reevaluate the nation's intelligence network, and in 1984 the President Jayawardene established the National Intelligence Bureau (NIB). The new organization combined intelligence units from the army, navy, air force, and police. It was headed by a deputy inspector general of police who reported directly to the Ministry of Defence. As the LTTE began using radio communications, the Sri Lanka Signals Corps began a SIGINT role, along with the Sri Lanka Navy that used its naval vessels to gather SIGINT.

In 1990, the Directorate of Military Intelligence and the Military Intelligence Corps was established formalizing the ad-hoc military intelligence units that existed prior to it. Military intelligence units had been involved in counterinsurgency operations with the police during the early stages of the Civil war in the north and east of the island and the 1987–89 JVP Insurrection in the south of the island, leading to the capture of JVP leader Rohana Wijeweera.

The NIB which had been deemed ineffective with major military and intelligence setbacks during the third phase of the war. It was restructured in 2003 as the State Intelligence Service (SIS) bringing all military and police intelligence agencies under the preview of the newly created post of Chief of National Intelligence under the Ministry of Defence. Significant intelligence triumphs during the war included the defection of Karuna amman; capture of Kumaran Pathmanathan aka KP, who was involved in arms procurement for LTTE, was captured in Malaysia and moved to Sri Lanka via Thailand by the SIS; interception of LTTE arms supplies in the high seas and killing of S. P. Thamilselvan by an airstrike.

== See also ==
- Sri Lankan cyber security community
- British intelligence agencies
