= Maithripala Sirisena =

President of Sri Lanka from 2015 to 2019

His Excellency Maithripala Sirisena
- මෛත්‍රීපාල සිරිසේන மைத்திரிபால சிறிசேன
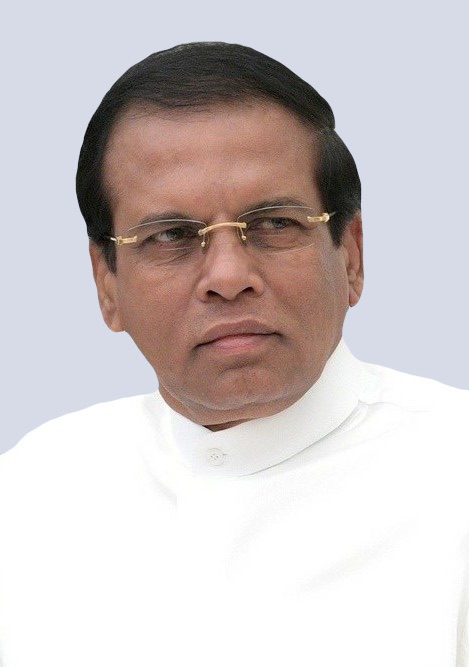
- Sirisena in 2017

7th President of Sri Lanka
- In office 9 January 2015 – 18 November 2019
- Prime Minister: Ranil Wickremesinghe; Mahinda Rajapaksa
- Preceded by: Mahinda Rajapaksa
- Succeeded by: Gotabaya Rajapaksa
Cabinet posts
Minister of Defence
In office 12 January 2015 – 18 November 2019
President	Himself
Prime Minister	Ranil Wickremesinghe; Mahinda Rajapaksa
Preceded by	Mahinda Rajapaksa
Succeeded by	Gotabaya Rajapaksa
Minister of Mahaweli Development and Environment (Note: Minister of Agriculture, Environment, Irrigation and Mahaweli Development (November 2005 – January 2007) Agricultural Development and Agrarian Services (January 2007 – April 2010))
In office 12 January 2015 – 18 November 2019
President	Himself
Prime Minister	Ranil Wickremesinghe; Mahinda Rajapaksa
Preceded by	Susil Premajayantha
In office 23 November 2005 – 23 April 2010
President	Mahinda Rajapaksa
Prime Minister	Ratnasiri Wickremanayake
Succeeded by	Mahinda Yapa Abeywardena
Minister of Health
In office 23 April 2010 – 21 November 2014
President	Mahinda Rajapaksa
Prime Minister	D. M. Jayaratne
Preceded by	Nimal Siripala de Silva
Succeeded by	Tissa Attanayake
Minister of Irrigation, Mahaweli and Rajarata Development (Note: Minister of River Basin Development and Rajarata Development (August 2004 – July 2005))
In office 10 August 2004 – 23 November 2005
President	Chandrika Kumaratunga
Prime Minister	Mahinda Rajapaksa
Minister of Mahaweli Development and Parliamentary Affairs
In office 1997–2001
President	Chandrika Kumaratunga
Prime Minister	Ratnasiri Wickremanayake; Sirimavo Bandaranaike
Preceded by	S. B. Dissanayake
Succeeded by	A. H. M. Azwer
Deputy Minister of Irrigation
In office 1994–1997
President	Chandrika Kumaratunga
Prime Minister	Sirimavo Bandaranaike
Leadership positions
5th Chairman of BIMSTEC
In office 31 August 2018 – 18 November 2019
Preceded by	Khadga Prasad Oli
Succeeded by	Gotabaya Rajapaksa
6th Chairperson of the Sri Lanka Freedom Party
In office 15 January 2015 – 12 May 2024
Preceded by	Mahinda Rajapaksa
Succeeded by	Nimal Siripala de Silva
19th Leader of the House
In office 3 May 2004 – 9 August 2005
President	Chandrika Kumaratunga
Prime Minister	Mahinda Rajapaksa
Preceded by	W. J. M. Lokubandara
Succeeded by	Nimal Siripala de Silva
General Secretary of the Sri Lanka Freedom Party
In office October 2001 – 21 November 2014
Chairperson	Chandrika Kumaratunga; Mahinda Rajapaksa
Preceded by	S. B. Dissanayake
Succeeded by	Anura Priyadharshana Yapa
Constituencies
Member of Parliament for Polonnaruwa District
In office 20 August 2020 – 24 September 2024
Majority	111,137 preferential votes
In office 9 March 1989 – 9 January 2015
Succeeded by	Jayasinghe Bandara
Majority	90,118 preferential votes

Personal details
- Born: Pallewatte Gamaralage Maithripala Yapa Sirisena; 3 September 1951 (age 75) Yagoda, Dominion of Ceylon
- Citizenship: Sri Lankan
- Party: Sri Lanka Freedom Party (since 1968); Communist Party of Ceylon (1966–1968)
- Other political affiliations: Sri Lanka People's Freedom Alliance (2019–2022); United People's Freedom Alliance (2004–2019) (Note: Except for the 2015 presidential election.); New Democratic Front (2014–2015) (Note: Only for the 2015 presidential election.); People's Alliance (1994–2004)
- Spouse: Jayanthi Pushpa Kumari
- Children: Chathurika; Daham; Dharani
- Relatives: Kumarasinghe (brother); Priyantha (brother)
- Education: Maxim Gorky Literature Institute
- Occupation: Politician

Maithripala Yapa Sirisena (Sinhala: පල්ලෙවත්‍ත ගමරාළලාගේ මෛත්‍රීපාල යාපා සිරිසේන; Tamil: பல்லேவத்த கமராளலாகே மைத்திரிபால யாப்பா சிறிசேன; born 3 September 1951) is a Sri Lankan politician who served as the seventh president of Sri Lanka from 9 January 2015 to 18 November 2019. Sirisena is Sri Lanka's first president from the North Central Province of the country and does not belong to the traditional Sri Lankan political elite. He served as a member of parliament from Polonnaruwa from 1989 to 2015 and from 2020 to 2024.

Sirisena joined mainstream politics in 1989 as a member of the Parliament of Sri Lanka and has held several ministries since 1994. He was the general-secretary of the Sri Lanka Freedom Party and was Minister of Health until November 2014 when he announced his candidacy in the 2015 presidential election as the "common candidate" of a coalition of opposition parties, running against party leader and incumbent president Mahinda Rajapaksa. His victory in the election was generally viewed as an upset, coming to office through votes won from the alternative Sinhala-majority rural constituency and the Tamil and Muslim minority groups that were alienated by the Rajapaksa government on post-war reconciliation and growing sectarian violence. Sirisena pledged to implement a 100-day reform program where he promised to rebalance the executive branch within 100 days of being elected. This plan included reinforcing Sri Lanka's judiciary and parliament, investigation of alleged war crimes during the final stages of the Sri Lankan civil war, repealing the controversial eighteenth amendment and re-instating the seventeenth amendment, reducing corruption and appointing UNP leader Ranil Wickremesinghe as prime minister. He later was reported to have publicly disavowed this program, claiming that he did not know where it originated.

Sirisena was sworn in as the sixth Executive President on 9 January 2015. Immediately afterwards he appointed Ranil Wickremesinghe as the new prime minister. After being sworn in, Sirisena stated that he would only serve one term. Sirisena voluntarily transferred significant presidential powers to parliament on 28 April 2015.

In 2018, Sirisena appointed former president Mahinda Rajapaksa as prime minister, dismissed Ranil Wickremesinghe and prorogued Parliament, instigating a constitutional crisis. Sirisena's actions were later declared as unconstitutional by the Supreme Court and Wickremesinghe was promptly reinstated as the prime minister.

== Early life and career ==
Maithripala Sirisena was born on 3 September 1951 as the eldest of a family of twelve with five brothers and six sisters, in Yagoda, a village in present-day Gampaha District. His father, Pallewatte Gamaralalage Albert Sirisena, was a World War II veteran who was awarded 2.0 ha (5 acres) of paddy land in Polonnaruwa near Parakrama Samudra which resulted in the family moving from Yagoda to Polonnaruwa. His mother, Yapa Appuhamilage Dona Nandawathi, was a school teacher.

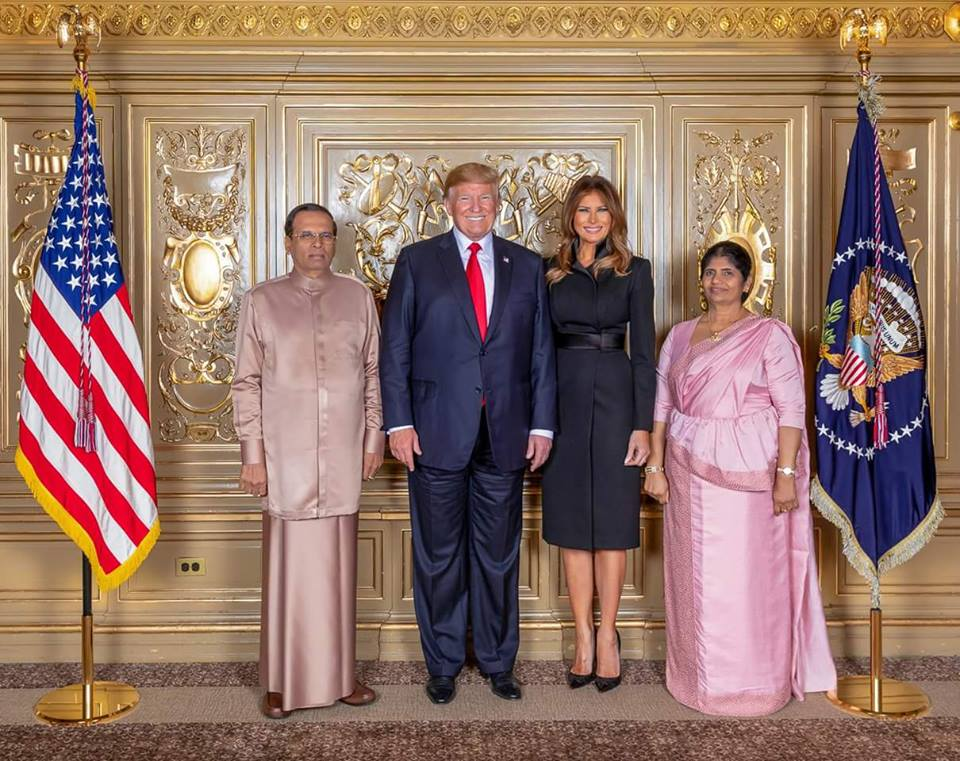
Maithripala Sirisena and Jayanthi Sirisena with Donald Trump and Melania Trump

He was educated at Thopawewa Maha Vidyalaya and Rajakeeya Madya Maha Vidyalaya Polonnaruwa where he first developed an interest in politics. While still in school, as a teenager, Sirisena became interested in communism and joined the Ceylon Communist Party (Maoist) becoming closely associated with party leader N. Shanmugathasan in party activities. In 1968, he took part in a communist party anti-government rally which was broken up by baton charging police.

At the age of 17, he was chosen as the secretary of the SLFP Youth Organisation in Polonnaruwa by the SLFP Member of Parliament for Polonnaruwa, Leelaratna Wijesingha. In 1971, aged 19, he was jailed for 15 months for alleged involvement in the Janatha Vimukthi Peramuna Insurrection. Following his release from prison, Sirisena joined All Ceylon SLFP Youth Organization led by Anura Bandaranaike and joined politics at the national level. After serving at a number of state institutions, Sirisena obtained the SLFP membership in 1978. In 1974 Sirisena started working at the Palugasdamana Multi-Purpose Cooperative Society as a purchasing office and in 1976 he became a grama sevaka niladhari (village officer) but resigned in 1978. He rose up the SLFP ranks, joining its politburo in 1981, where he was chosen as the president of the All Island SLFP Youth Organisation, and also later served as treasurer. During the 1981 Presidential poll, when Basil Rajapaksa joined the United National Party, he took over the responsibility of the secretary of the organisation. Subsequently, he was appointed the Polonnaruwa SLFP chief organiser by the SLFP hierarchy. He became president of the All Island SLFP Youth Organisation in 1983.

Sirisena studied for three years at the Sri Lanka School of Agriculture, Kundasale from where he earned a diploma in agriculture in 1973. In 1980 he earned a Diploma in political science at the Maxim Gorky Literature Institute in Russia.

== Legislative career (1989–2015) ==
=== Sri Lankan Parliament ===
Sirisena contested the 1989 parliamentary election as one of the SLFP's candidates in Polonnaruwa District and was elected to the Parliament. He was re-elected at the 1994 parliamentary election, this time as a People's Alliance (PA) candidate. In 1997 he was appointed as the general secretary of the SLFP for the first time, from which he later resigned. In August 2000 Sirisena tried to become general secretary of the SLFP but was beaten by S. B. Dissanayake. Sirisena was instead appointed one of the Deputy Presidents of SLFP. He became general secretary of the SLFP in October 2001 following Dissanayake's defection to the United National Party (UNP).

Minister of Mahaweli Development

Sirisena was appointed Deputy Minister of Irrigation in the new PA government led by Chandrika Kumaratunga in 1994. In 1997 President Kumaratunga promoted him to the Cabinet, appointing him Minister of Mahaweli Development. While in this office he initiated many concessionary grants to improve the standard of the farming community. He was also responsible for influencing the government's decision to give farmers a bag of fertiliser for Rs. 350 in order to combat the food crisis at the time. He also saved the Paddy Marketing Board from privatisation converting it into a government institution when he became the Agriculture Minister, in 2005. The Paddy Marketing Board continues to regulate the prices of paddy to this day. He also began important irrigation projects such as Moragahakanda, Kalu and Walawe rivers. He was re-elected to Parliament at the 2000 parliamentary election and retained his ministerial portfolio.

=== Opposition ===
He was re-elected at the 2001 parliamentary election but the PA lost the election and so Sirisena lost his ministerial position.

In January 2004 the SLFP joined forces with the Janatha Vimukthi Peramuna to form a political alliance called the United People's Freedom Alliance (UPFA). Sirisena was re-elected at the 2004 parliamentary election as a UPFA candidate. President Kumaratunga appointed him Minister of River Basin Development and Rajarata Development in the new UPFA government in April 2004. He was also appointed Leader of the House. Sirisena's ministerial portfolio was renamed as Minister of Irrigation, Mahaweli and Rajarata Development in July 2005. He resigned as Leader of the House in August 2005.

Minister of Agriculture

After the 2005 presidential election newly elected president Mahinda Rajapaksa appointed Sirisena Minister of Agriculture, Environment, Irrigation and Mahaweli Development in November 2005. On 27 March 2006 Sirisena's personal secretary M. L. Dharmasiri was shot dead by unknown gunmen in Aranangawila. Following a cabinet reshuffle in January 2007 he was appointed Minister of Agricultural Development and Agrarian Services Development by President Rajapaksa.

In order to combat the 2007–08 world food price crisis, Sirisena initiated a plan under the scheme 'Api Wavamu – Rata Nagamu' to improve local food production on a national scale. Festivals of tilling were conducted in each divisional secretariat every year leading to the re-cultivation of more than 1 million abandoned paddy fields under the programme. The project was considered a great success being acknowledged as his green revolution.

While serving as the Minister of Agriculture Sirisena also served as the acting Defence Minister on several occasions during the Sri Lankan civil war. He was acting defence minister during the last two weeks of the civil war when some of the worst alleged war crimes were committed.

Sirisena has claimed that LTTE may have tried to assassinate him on at least five occasions. Sirisena narrowly escaped death on 9 October 2008 when a convoy he was part of was attacked by a Liberation Tigers of Tamil Eelam's suicide bomber at Piriwena Junction in Boralesgamuwa, Colombo. One person was killed and seven injured.

Minister of health

Sirisena was re-elected at the 2010 parliamentary election and was appointed minister of health in April 2010. During his time Sirisena sought to combat cigarette and alcohol consumption within the country. He introduced a National Medicinal Drug Policy based on that of the Sri Lanka National Pharmaceuticals Policy of Seneka Bibile and brought the Cigarette and Alcohol act to parliament against cigarette packaging that includes pictorial warnings. The act recommended 80% of packaging include pictorial warnings, however, this was reduced to 60% due to pressure from many multinational companies and from some areas of the government itself. In May 2014 Sirisena was elected as one of the Vice Presidents of the World Health Assembly.

=== Committees ===
Committees Involved

- Parliament of Sri Lanka Consultative Committee on Irrigation and Water Resources Management
- Parliament of Sri Lanka Consultative Committee on Health
- Parliament of Sri Lanka Consultative Committee on Agriculture
- Parliament of Sri Lanka Consultative Committee on Co-operatives and Internal Trade
- Parliament of Sri Lanka Consultative Committee on Livestock & Rural Community Development
- Parliament of Sri Lanka Consultative Committee on Defence
- Parliament of Sri Lanka Consultative Committee on Defence and Urban Development

Committees Served

- Parliament of Sri Lanka Committee on Parliamentary Business (14th Parliament)
- Parliament of Sri Lanka Committee of Selection (14th Parliament)
- Parliament of Sri Lanka Committee on High Posts (14th Parliament)
- Parliament of Sri Lanka Select Committee of Parliament on Traffic Accidents (14th Parliament)
- Parliament of Sri Lanka Select Committee of Parliament to Recommend and Report on Political and Constitutional Measures to Empower the Peoples of Sri Lanka to Live as One Nation (14th Parliament)

== Presidency (2015–2019) ==
Presidential Standard adopted by Maithripala Sirisena

=== Presidential campaign ===
Following days of speculation in the media, Sirisena announced on 21 November 2014 that he would challenge incumbent president Mahinda Rajapaksa at the 2015 presidential election as the common opposition candidate. Sirisena claimed that everything in Sri Lanka was controlled by one family and that the country was heading towards a dictatorship with rampant corruption, nepotism and a breakdown of the rule of law. He has pledged to abolish the executive presidency within 100 days of being elected, repeal the controversial eighteenth amendment, re-instate the seventeenth amendment and appoint UNP leader Ranil Wickremasinghe as prime minister. Following the announcement Sirisena, along with several other ministers who supported him, were stripped of their ministerial positions and expelled from the SLFP. His ministerial security and vehicles were also withdrawn.

Sirisena released his manifesto, titled A Compassionate Maithri Governance — A Stable Country, on 19 December 2014 at a rally at Viharamahadevi Park. The main pledge in the manifesto was the replacement of the executive presidency with a Westminster style cabinet but the manifesto acknowledged that Sirisena would need the support of the parliament to amend the constitution. The manifesto also made a commitment to replace the open list proportional representation system with a mixture of first-past-the-post and PR for electing MPs. Parliamentary elections will be held in April 2015 after the constitution has been amended. Independent commissions would be established to oversee the judiciary, police, elections department, Auditor-General's Department and Attorney-General's Department. The Commission on Bribery and Corruption would be strengthened and political diplomatic appointments annulled. Populist measures in the manifesto included a commitment to write-off 50% of farmers' loans, reduce fuel prices by removing taxes and a salary increase of Rs. 10,000 for public servants. Public spending on health would increase from 1.8% of GDP to 3% of GDP whilst that on education would increase from 1.7% of GDP to 6% of GDP. The manifesto also stated that the casino licences granted to Kerry Packer's Crown Resort and John Keells Holdings's Water Front will be cancelled. Political victims during Rajapaksa's rule, including Sarath Fonseka and Shirani Bandaranayake, would be re-appointed. In a separate document Sirisena pledged that, whilst resisting any international investigation, he would establish an independent domestic inquiry into the alleged war crimes during the final stages of the Sri Lankan Civil War.

Sirisena was declared the winner after receiving 52.42% of all votes cast compared to Rajapaksa's 47.58%. Sirisena was the winner in 12 electoral districts whilst Rajapaksa was victorious in the remaining 10. On the contrary Rajapakse won in 90 electorates while Sirisena managed to win only in 70 electorates. The result was generally seen as a shock. When Rajapaksa called the election in November 2014 he had looked certain to win.

Transition

According to Mangala Samaraweera and Rajitha Senaratne, senior figures in the Sirisena campaign, Rajapaksa attempted to stage a coup in order to stay in power when it became clear he was going to lose the election. They alleged that Rajapaksa and his brother Gotabhaya Rajapaksa, the Defence Secretary, summoned Commander of the Army Daya Ratnayake, Inspector General of Police N. K. Illangakoon and Attorney General Yuwanjana Wanasundera to Temple Trees at around 1:00 a.m. on 9 January 2015. Rajapaksa allegedly pressured the three officials to deploy troops, annul the election results and declare a state of emergency but they refused. According to the Colombo Telegraph Rajapaksa also wanted to dissolve parliament. It was only then Rajapaksa decided to concede defeat and summoned Ranil Wickremesinghe to assure him of a smooth transition of power.

A spokesman for Rajapaksa has denied the allegations as baseless. The army and police have also denied the allegations. The new government is to investigate the alleged coup attempt.

Sirisena was sworn in as Sri Lanka's sixth executive president (and seventh overall) before Supreme Court judge K. Sripavan in Independence Square, Colombo at 6:20 p.m. on 9 January 2015. It is custom for the president to be sworn in before the chief justice but Sirisena had refused to be sworn in before Chief Justice Peiris who had been appointed by Rajapaksa after the controversial impeachment of the previous chief justice. Immediately afterwards, Wickremesinghe was sworn in as Sri Lanka's new prime minister before Sirisena. After being sworn in Sirisena stated that he would only serve one term.

=== 100-day reform program ===
Sirisena's 100 days Program cabinet 10 most senior members
Office	Name	Term
Prime Minister	Ranil Wickremesinghe°	Jan-Aug
Minister of Foreign Affairs	Mangala Samaraweera°	Jan-Aug
Minister of Defence	Maithripala Sirisena	Jan-Aug
Minister of Finance	Ravi Karunanayake°	Jan-Aug
Minister of Justice	Wijeyadasa Rajapakshe°	Jan-Aug
Minister of Home Affairs	Joseph Michael Perera	Jan-Aug
Minister of Industry and Commerce	Rishad Bathiudeen*°	Jan-Aug
Minister of Health and Indigenous Medicine	Rajitha Senaratne°	Jan-Aug
Minister of Education	Akila Viraj Kariyawasam°	Jan-Aug
Minister of Agriculture	Duminda Dissanayake°	Jan-Aug
- *Retained from previous administration °Retained after August elections

With an interim cabinet formed on 12 January, Sirisena called the Parliamentary elections, taking the defence portfolio for himself, and appointing Ranil Wickremesinghe as minister of reconciliation, policy development and economic affairs, to go with his prime ministership.

In his election manifesto, Sirisena had promised a 100-day reform program planning to dissolve the parliament and holding new elections on 23 April 2015. Some reforms, such as the curtailing of presidential powers and re-introducing the two-term limit, were introduced by the passing of the nineteenth amendment. In addition, Sirisena enacted a Right to Information bill. Other changes, notably electoral reforms, were not carried out. With electoral reforms stalled and the 100-day reform program falling behind schedule, the UNP started calling for parliamentary elections. Sirisena dissolved parliament on 26 June 2015 and called for early elections. However, when faced with criticism concerning the reforms, Sirisena publicly disavowed the 100-day reform program.

=== Parliamentary elections ===
In his election manifesto, Sirisena had promised a 100-day reform program planning to dissolve the parliament and holding new elections on 23 April 2015. However, Srisena and his government faced opposition from a large contingent of legislators loyal to Mahinda Rajapaksa, and, although some reforms, such as the curtailing of presidential powers and re-introducing the two-term limit, were introduced by the passing of the nineteenth amendment, others, notably electoral reforms, were not carried out. With electoral reforms stalled and the 100-day reform program falling behind schedule, the UNP started calling for parliamentary elections. Sirisena dissolved parliament on 26 June 2015.

The date of the election was set for 17 August 2015, with the new parliament expected to convene on 1 September 2015. Nominations took place between 6 July 2015 and 13 July 2015. The UPFA/SLFP MPs who remained loyal to former president Rajapaksa called for Rajapaksa to be made the UPFA's prime ministerial candidate for the election. This alarmed those members of the UPFA/SLPF who had supported Sirisena during the presidential election. They urged Sirisena to prevent Rajapaksa's return to politics but Sirisena remained silent on the matter. After the parliamentary election was called it was announced that Rajapaksa would contest but not as the prime ministerial candidate which would be decided after the election. Feeling "betrayed" by Sirisena, his supporters in the UPFA/SLFP allied themselves with the UNP to form the United National Front for Good Governance. On 8 July 2015, several factions accused Sirisena of having betrayed the mandate that was given to him by the people in the 2015 presidential election over nominating his predecessor Rajapaksa, who faces various allegations of human rights violations, to contest in this election. Despite his assurances to the media that he would not grant nominations to pro-Rajapaksa parliamentarians who were involved in various criminal activities, some were nominated. On 14 July 2015, at a special press conference, Sirisena announced he would remain impartial during the elections after granting the nomination to Rajapaksa, hinted that Rajapaksa could be defeated in the parliamentary election similar to the presidential election.

The United National Front for Good Governance became the largest group in Parliament after securing 45.66% of votes and 106 seats whilst the UPFA won 42.38% of votes and 95 seats. Rajapaksa quickly conceded defeat in his attempt to become prime minister. The result left the UNFGG seven seats short of a majority in Parliament. However, on 20 August 2015 the central committee of the SLFP agreed to form a national government with the UNP for two years. Wickremesinghe was sworn in as prime minister on 21 August 2015. Immediately afterwards a memorandum of understanding to work together in Parliament was signed by acting SLFP general secretary Duminda Dissanayake and UNP general secretary Kabir Hashim.

The elections saw minor violence and violations of election laws but were generally incident-free, peaceful, free and fair. Sirisena was praised for "shepherding an inclusive process" during the elections by the United Nations Secretary-General Ban Ki-moon. The European External Action Service spokesperson also stated that the election was "genuine, well administered and peaceful."

=== National government (2015–2018) ===
On 20 August 2015 the central committee of the Sri Lanka Freedom Party (SLFP), the main constituent of the UPFA, agreed to form a national government with the UNP for two years. Ranil Wickremesinghe was sworn in as prime minister on 21 August 2015. Immediately afterwards a memorandum of understanding to work together in Parliament was signed by acting SLFP general secretary Duminda Dissanayake and UNP general secretary Kabir Hashim.

Three UNFGG cabinet ministers were sworn in on 24 August 2015. A further 39 cabinet ministers, 28 from the UNFGG and 11 from the UPFA, were sworn in on 4 September 2015. Three more cabinet ministers, one from the UNFGG and two from the UPFA, were sworn in on 9 September 2015. 19 state ministers (11 UNFGG, 8 UPFA) and 21 deputy ministers (11 UNFGG, 10 UPFA) were also sworn in on 9 September 2015. Two more deputy ministers, both from the UPFA, were sworn in on 10 September 2015.

=== Constitutional crisis ===
On the evening of 26 October 2018, Sirisena, in a sudden move, sacked Ranil Wickremesinghe and appointed Mahinda Rajapaksa as prime minister after the United People's Freedom Alliance withdrew from the unity government. Immediately following the move, media institutions in the country were suppressed in what is now being termed a hostile takeover. Wickremesinghe refused to accept the dismissal, stating that it was illegal and unconstitutional. Sirisena promptly prorogued Parliament and appointed a new Cabinet of Ministers, in effect creating a parallel government to what was operational in the country at the time, a series of events referred to by the BBC as "somewhere in between House of Cards, Game of Thrones and Shakespeare's darkest Roman plays". This resulted in a constitutional crisis, with analysts referring to Sirisena's actions as a coup.

The crisis created significant fears as to the state of democratic institutions in the country, with former Ministers refusing to step down from their posts. Karu Jayasuriya, the speaker for the Parliament, refused to acknowledge the legality of this move, stating that the ousted Wickramasinghe is the lawful prime minister and urging the president to convene Parliament to resolve the issue. However, since then the speaker's office also issued statements expressing that they will not prevent Rajapaksa from occupying the prime minister's seat in Parliament. A reported ten thousand people mobilised in a protest in Colombo, demanding that Sirisena reconvene Parliament.

On 13 December 2018, the full bench (seven-judge bench) of the Supreme Court unanimously ruled that President Sirisena's decision to dissolve parliament on 9 November, before the completion of four and half years, was unconstitutional and illegal.

Following the Supreme court ruling, Rajapaksa backed down and Wickremesinghe was re-appointed prime minister.

=== Easter bombings ===
On the morning of 21 April 2019, Easter Sunday series of coordinated terrorist suicide bombings took place targeting three Christian churches and three luxury hotels in the commercial capital Colombo killing 253 and wounding over 500 people. President Sirisena who was in Singapore on a personal visit at the time ordered a Presidential Commission of Inquiry into the bombings to identify the perpetrators. On his return to the island on 22 April, he declared a state of emergency from midnight of 22 April by issuing an extraordinary gazette notification. The government announced a national day of mourning the following day.

The President and the government were heavily criticised for not heeding warnings from Indian intelligence services, but President Sirisena denied knowledge of warnings before his departure overseas on 15 April. Prime Minister Ranil Wickremesinghe later apologised for failing to stop the attacks issuing a statement on Twitter stating "We take collective responsibility and apologise to our fellow citizens for our failure to protect victims of these tragic events. We pledge to rebuild our churches, revive our economy, and take all measures to prevent terrorism, with the support of the international community."

On 23 April, President Sirisena announced his plans to change the heads of the defence forces, and on 25 April Hemasiri Fernando, secretary to the Ministry of Defence tendered his resignation to the President, after it was announced that President Sirisena has requested the Defence Secretary and the Inspector General of Police (IGP) resign. With no response to his request to resign, President Sirisena sent the IGP Pujith Jayasundara on compulsory leave and appointed an acting Inspector General of Police .

Field Marshal Sarath Fonseka stated in parliament on 8 May that President Sirisena had been informed 15 times at the National Security Council about warnings of a terrorist attack, yet no instructions were given. The President has intern turned down calls by the prime minister and the UNP parliamentary group to appoint Fonseka as the Minister of Law and Order following the bombing. He has refused to appoint Fonseka to a Ministerial post since the 2018 constitutional crisis citing that Fonseka's name had come up in the police investigations in an alleged presidential assassination attempt.

Sirisena was highly critical of the Parliamentary Select Committee (PSC) probe into the Easter Sunday terrorist attacks and incidents in its aftermath appointed by the Speaker of the Parliament of the PSC for summering intelligence and police officers. He had ordered no public officer to appear for summons issued by the PSC. Following Chief of National Intelligence Sisira Mendis' statement at the PSC to the effect that President Sirisena knew about the warnings of an impending attack, Sirisena sacked Mendis within hours.

== Post-presidency (2019–present) ==
=== Return to parliament ===
Sirisena stepped down as president on 18 November 2019 following the 2019 presidential election, having opted not to contest a second term and remain neutral during the election. Following the election he was appointed as Chairman of the Sri Lanka Freedom Party. Sirisena contested the 2020 Sri Lankan parliamentary elections from the Polonnaruwa district and was elected to parliament having gained the highest number of preferential votes in the district.

=== Easter bombings inquiry findings ===
In February 2021, the Presidential Commission of Inquiry appointed by Sirisena during his term as president to investigate the 2019 Sri Lanka Easter bombings, had stated it is final report had recommended the Attorney General to initiate criminal proceedings against Sirisena and his intelligence chiefs for failing to act on intelligence received to prevent the attacks on 21 April 2019. This report was rejected by the Executive Council of Sri Lanka Freedom Party which re-elected Sirisena as its chairman. In January 2023, the Supreme Court of Sri Lanka ordered Sirisena to pay Rs.100 million ($272,000) as compensation to the victims of the bombing. The supreme court found that senior government and intelligence officials were responsible for failing to prevent the attacks. The former police chief Pujith Jayasundara and former state intelligence services head Nilantha Jayawardena were also ordered to pay Rs. 75 million each, and the former defence minister was ordered to pay Rs. 50 million. On 16 August 2024, Sirisena completed the payment of compensation of Rs.100 million, after being ordered to complete payment before 30 August.

=== 2024 presidential campaign ===
On 31 January 2023, Sirisena announced his intention to contest in the 2024 Sri Lankan presidential election at a conference for the Sri Lanka Freedom Party. In his speech, Sirisena addressed the recent Easter Bombing inquiry findings, apologised to the Catholic community and compared himself to anti-apartheid activist Nelson Mandela. Sirisena withdrew his campaign the following year and endorsed Minister of Justice Wijeyadasa Rajapakshe as the SLFP candidate instead. However, later he withdrew support to Rajapakshe and declared to remain independent and not back any candidate.

=== Rift within the party ===
On 4 April 2024, the Colombo District Court issued an interim injunction temporarily preventing Sirisena from functioning as the party chairman until 18 April, following a case filed by former SLFP chairman Chandrika Kumaratunga. On 18 April, the injunction was further extended until 9 May. On 24 April, another permanent injunction order was issued effective until the conclusion of the trial.

On 12 May, Sirisena formally resigned as chairman of the SLFP, and the pro-Sirisena faction of the party unanimously voted to appoint Wijeyadasa Rajapakshe as the new chairman, a move which was not accepted by the anti-Sirisena faction of the party.

== Controversies ==
=== Nepotism and corruption ===
Despite pledges made during the presidential campaign, Sirisena has himself been accused of nepotism since becoming president. A few days after Sirisena took power in January 2015, his brother Kumarasinghe Sirisena was appointed chairman of the state-owned Sri Lanka Telecom. The appointment came despite objections from Prime Minister Ranil Wickremesinghe and several other cabinet ministers. Sirisena's son-in-law Thilina Suranjith Wewelpanawa (Chathurika's husband) was appointed public relations officer at the Ministry of Defence in February 2015 — Sirisena is Minister of Defence. In September 2015 Sirisena's son Daham accompanied his father as he visited New York City for the Seventieth session of the United Nations General Assembly.

Despite having no official role, Daham Sirisena sat with the Sri Lankan delegation in the United Nations General Assembly and accompanied his father as he met world leaders such as Prime Minister of India Narendra Modi and President of the Swiss Confederation Simonetta Sommaruga. Sirisena's daughter Chathurika, who also has no official role, has been the guest of honour/chief guest at several Ministry of Defence events. At another event where Chathurika was chief guest, she was accompanied by members of the Presidential Security Division. In September 2015 Chathurika was accompanied by government officials and police officers as she went on a private "fact finding mission" to Mahawelithenna near Welikanda.

President Sirisena was accused by Australian authorities of soliciting a bribe from an Australian contractor and his chief of staff was caught red-handed by Police while accepting cash from a businessman in the carpark of a hotel.

In 2018 his chief of staff, I. H. K. Mahanama, was arrested by officials of the Commission to Investigate Allegations of Bribery or Corruption (CIABOC) for allegedly accepting a bribe of Rs. 20 million from an Indian businessman as a part of an Rs. 100 million bribes for helping the acquisition of the Kantale Sugar Factory. Mahanama, the chief of staff of the president, in his previous role as secretary to the Ministry of Lands, had secured Cabinet approval to auction scrap material of the factory, assets which were claimed by M G Sugars Lanka (Pvt) Ltd under the agreement. The company then filed arbitration proceedings in a Singapore tribunal to stop the Government of Sri Lanka from selling the machinery and scrap. The investors sent letters to PM's office which recommended they to complain to the CIABOC which launched investigations. However, despite the investigations, Mahanama was appointed by Sirisena as his chief of staff. Centre for Human Rights (CHR) questioned how Sirisena appointed Mahanama as his chief of staff while he was under corruption investigations.

=== Comments about Enrique Iglesias concert ===
In 2015, Maithripala Sirisena criticised and called for the organisers of an Enrique Iglesias concert in Colombo to be whipped, after the behaviour of some female fans. Sirisena stated, "I don't advocate that these uncivilised women who removed their brassieres should be beaten with toxic stingray tails, but those who organised such an event should be."

=== Media freedom ===
Media freedom increased under Sirisena compared to previous governments. However, in June 2018 the Telecommunications Regulatory Commission closed down transmission towers operated by TNL TV after a negative commentary about a president's speech. The TRC claimed that the reason was not paying the licence fee but was criticised by both government allies and opposition MPs. Joint Opposition MR Dinesh Gunawardana presented irregularities of the action in the parliament citing that the TRC violated the Telecommunication Act by closing down the tower as the licence could be cancelled and a station could be sealed only after giving due notice which was not carried out by the TRC. The claim of not paying the fees was also called to doubt as the station had made the payments up to 2017 and issues pertaining to licence fees were being negotiated by the TNL.

=== Airline cashew nut remarks ===
In September 2018, Sirisena remarked upon the quality of cashew nuts served to him on a SriLankan Airlines flight: "When I returned from Nepal, they served some cashew nuts on the plane [that], let alone humans, even dogs can't eat, who approves these things?". It was unclear as to what exactly was offensive about the said nuts, but the outburst which was much remarked upon, led to comments that Sirisena had "come unhinged". The airline promptly stopped serving cashew nuts.

=== Alleged assassination plot ===
In October 2018, while addressing the cabinet, Sirisena alleged that the Indian Research and Analysis Wing was plotting his assassination. This comment was made after Sri Lankan CID arrested an Indian national late in September for allegedly planning the assassinations of both Sirisena and former Defence Secretary Gotabaya Rajapaksa. After Sirisena's comments, local media reported that the Indian High Commissioner met with Sirisena and the Indian prime minister Narendra Modi had a telephone conversation with Sirisena.

=== Homophobic remarks ===
In November 2018, in the midst of the Constitutional Crisis set off by the President's actions on 26 October 2018, President Sirisena took the stage with former president Mahinda Rajapaksa at a rally organised by the Sri Lanka Podujana Peramuna. In his speech, he heavily criticised Prime Minister Ranil Wickramasinghe, and referred to Wickramasinghe and his close allies as 'butterflies' and claimed they had resorted to a 'butterfly lifestyle', placing it above all other duties to the state and the people. This was widely recognised as a homophobic remark by Sri Lankan LGBT activists and other civil society actors.

A strongly worded statement was written and signed by numerous members of the Sri Lankan LGBT+ community within hours of Sirisena's remark being made, and was widely shared online. In it they said: "By trivialising homophobia in this fashion, President Sirisena should be held responsible for any homophobic incidents that Sri Lankan citizens may experience in the coming days".

A citizen's protest – which had been happening consistently in the heart of Colombo city every evening since the President's declaration that he had appointed Rajapaksa as the country's prime minister – paid special attention to Sirisena's 'Butterfly' remark the next day, making a butterfly out of lit lamps.

Sri Lanka's Finance and Media Minister Mangala Samaraweera also responded on Twitter, stating: "I would rather be a butterfly than a leech Mr. President!!!"

=== Attempts to delay elections ===
In May 2019 it was reported that Sirisena was attempting to delay the 2019 Sri Lankan presidential election to 20 June 2020 and was seeking an advisory opinion from the Supreme Court (SC) in terms of Article 129 of the constitution. Sri Lanka Podujana Peramuna (SLPP) Chairman Prof. G.L. Peiris said yesterday his party would make every possible attempt to thwart the move by the president to postpone the presidential election. Elections Commissioner Mahinda Deshapriya placed the election date between 9 November and 9 December and claimed that the elections cannot be delayed and the state of emergency in the aftermath of the 2019 Sri Lanka Easter bombings cannot be used as an excuse as elections have been held in a state of emergency in the past and claimed that any attempt to delay elections will be a crime and violation of the rights of close to 15 million voters.

=== Appointment of new Army Commander ===
In August 2019, President Maithripala Sirisena appointed Major General Shavendra Silva as the new Commander of the Sri Lankan Army, despite the latter being accused of practicing human rights abuses during the country's civil war.

=== Pardoning of murder convict ===
In November 2019, President Sirisena issued a presidential pardon to Shramantha Jude Anthony Jayamaha who was serving a life sentence after being convicted of murdering a young woman at the Royal Park apartment complex in Rajagiriya on 30 June 2005 in a high-profile case. The President's Media Division claim the pardon was issued citing the convict's age (he was 19 when the murder took place), his good behaviour, and advocacy from several religious groups led by a member of parliament, Athuraliye Rathana Thero. Later these claims have been refuted by Raymond Wickramasinghe, Roman Catholic Bishop of Galle. Earlier that year President Sirisena had issued a presidential pardon for Galagoda Aththe Gnanasara Thero, general secretary of the Bodu Bala Sena, who had been convicted of being in contempt of court.

=== Official residence ===
In February 2024, the Supreme Court of Sri Lanka, quashed the cabinet decision on 15 October 2019 to allow President Sirisena the continued use his official residence in Paget Road, Colombo following his term as president. The three-judge-bench held that decision by Cabinet of Ministers on the benefits of a retiring president while in office was wrong and was beyond that of the Presidents' Entitlements Act No. 4 of 1986, amounting to violation of the rule of law and fundamental rights of citizens. The judgment was delivered pursuant to a fundamental rights petition by the Centre for Policy Alternatives and Dr Paikiasothy Saravanamuttu, its executive director. This was following an interim order issued in March 2022.

== Domestic policy ==
=== Death penalty ===
Sirisena commented in October 2015, after a series of high-profile incidents of rape, killing and sexual abuse, that he supports a dialogue on the introduction of the death penalty should it be approved by Parliament.

=== Taxation ===
In 2018, the government introduced changes to the taxation system, including changes to the Pay-as-you-earn tax (PAYE). In May, Sirisena is reported to have stated in a cabinet meeting that the Government Ministers and MPs are not subjected to PAYE as MPs have honourifics before their names as such receive honourariums and not salaries from the State.

== Foreign policy ==
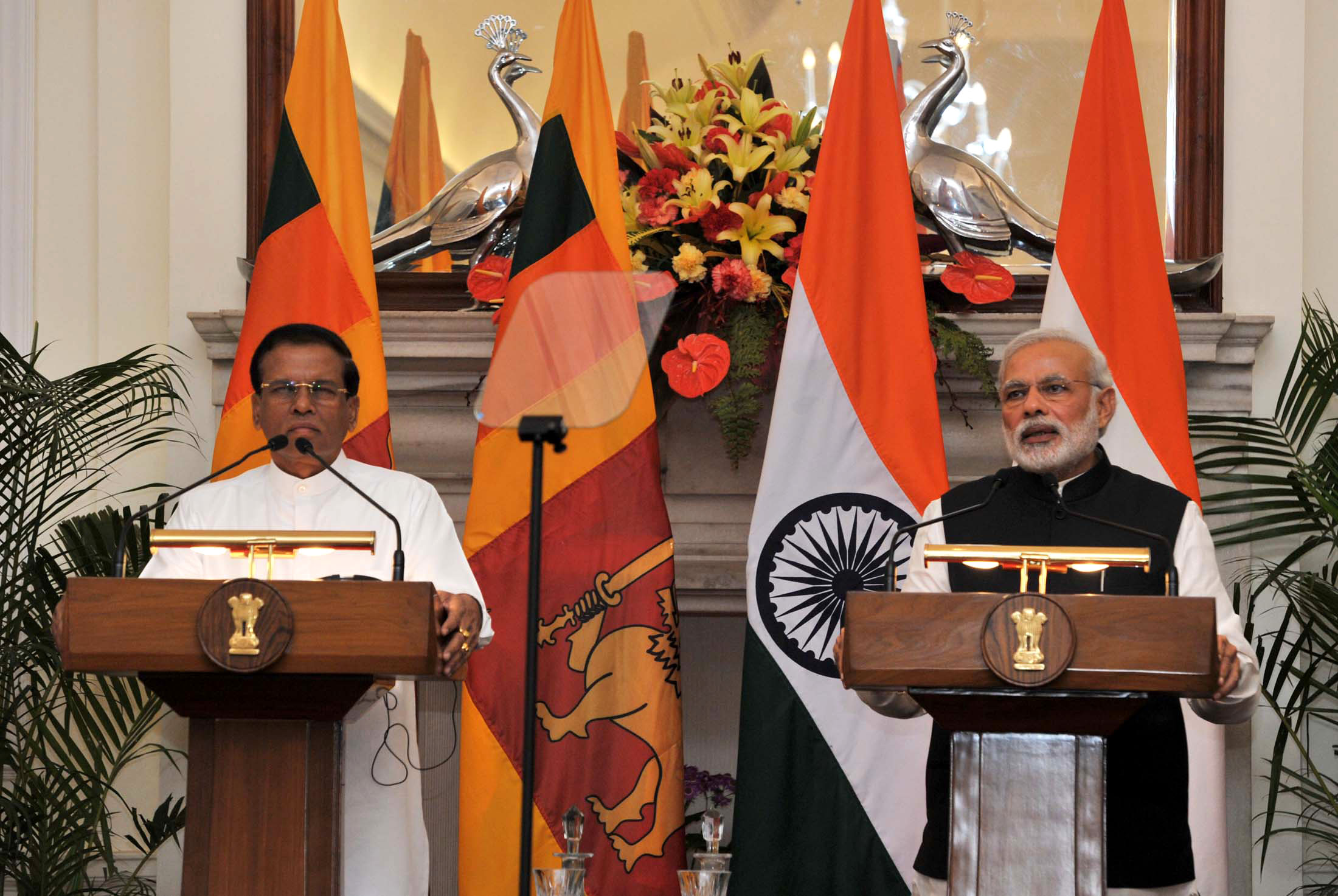
President Maithripala Sirisena on a State Visit to India, February 2015

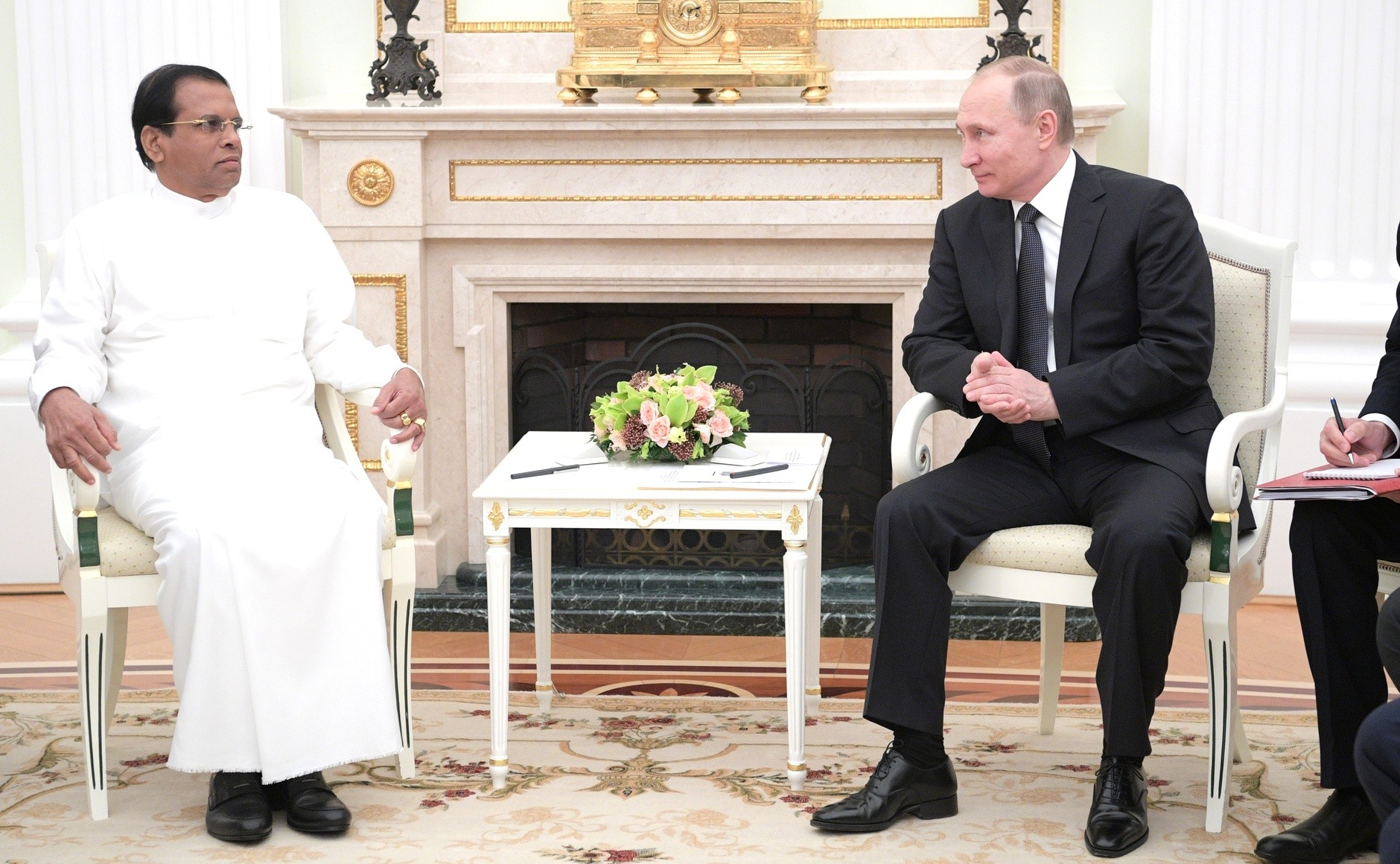
President Maithripala Sirisena meets with Russian President Vladimir Putin in March 2017

As the country grew ever closer to China during the previous administration, while simultaneously departing from its traditional ally of India, Sirisena said that he would treat all key Asian countries of India, China, Pakistan and Japan equally. Sri Lanka has moved closer to China, especially in terms of naval agreements. India and Sri Lanka in February 2015 signed a nuclear energy deal to improve relationships. Recently elected Indian prime minister Narendra Modi met with Sirisena in New Delhi and stated that: "India is Sri Lanka's closest neighbor and friend. Our destinies are interlinked." Sirisena has outlined the general foreign policy goals of his government as being cooperation with all nations, with an emphasis on Asia.

== Public image ==
Although legally entitled to use the style His Excellency as the president of Sri Lanka, he requested the media and the people of Sri Lanka, to avoid using the style and also to avoid using the word First Lady for his wife, and requested to only use "President's wife".

== Personal life ==
Sirisena is married to Jayanthi Pushpa Kumari, they have two daughters, Chathurika, Dharani, and a son, Daham.

Sirisena is a teetotaler, vegetarian, and a Theravada Buddhist.

Sirisena's youngest brother, Priyantha Sirisena, died on 28 March 2015 after being attacked by a man wielding an axe two days earlier in his hometown of Polonnaruwa, 215 kilometres (134 miles) north-east of the capital Colombo. Priyantha was immediately transferred to the hospital in critical condition, where he died from severe head injuries; the elder Sirisena was in China on a state visit at the time.

Sirisena's daughter Chathurika Sirisena launched her first booked title Janadhipathi Thaththa in 2017. This is the first biography written by a daughter of a president of Sri Lanka. The book, which was praised for its command of Sinhala, was later revealed to have been ghostwritten by an employee of Media Gang, a marketing agency owned by Chathurika Sirisena. Meanwhile, Sirisena's son, Daham, has been cited in multiple assaults and been named in leading a mob attack on a nightclub. Charges against him have been since withdrawn.

== Notes ==
Political offices
Preceded by Mahinda Rajapaksa	President of Sri Lanka; 2015–2019	Succeeded by Gotabaya Rajapaksa
Preceded by Mahinda Rajapaksa	Minister of Defence; 2015–2019	Succeeded by Gotabaya Rajapaksa
Preceded by Susil Premajayanth	Minister of Mahaweli Development and Environment; 2015–2019	Succeeded by S. M. Chandrasena
Preceded by Nimal Siripala de Silva	Minister of Health; 2010–2014	Succeeded by Tissa Attanayake
Preceded by	Minister of Agricultural Development and Agrarian Services; 2005–2010	Succeeded by Mahinda Yapa Abeywardena
Preceded by W. J. M. Lokubandara	Leader of the House; 2004–2005	Succeeded by Nimal Siripala de Silva
Preceded by	Minister of Irrigation, Mahaweli and Rajarata Development; 2004–2005	Succeeded by
Preceded by S. B. Dissanayake	Mahaweli Development and Parliamentary Affairs; 1997–2001	Succeeded by A. H. M. Azwer
Parliament of Sri Lanka
Preceded by	Member of Parliament for Polonnaruwa; 1989–2015	Succeeded by
Party political offices
Preceded by Mahinda Rajapaksa	Chairman of the Sri Lanka Freedom Party; 2015–present	Incumbent
Preceded by S. B. Dissanayake	General-Secretary of the Sri Lanka Freedom Party; 2001–2014	Succeeded by Anura Priyadharshana Yapa
Preceded by	General-Secretary of the Sri Lanka Freedom Party; 1997–?	Succeeded by
Diplomatic posts
Preceded by Mahinda Rajapaksa	Chairperson of the Commonwealth of Nations; 2015	Succeeded by Joseph Muscat
