= Defence Services Command and Staff College (Sri Lanka) =

Military academy at Batalanda, Sri Lanka

- Former names: Army Command and Staff College
- Motto: To war with wisdom and knowledge
- Type: Military Staff College
- Established: 1 January 1997
- Commandant: Major General D K S K Dolage
- Location: Sapugaskanda, Makola South, WP, Sri Lanka

The Defence Services Command and Staff College (DSCSC) is a staff college of the Sri Lanka Armed Forces. It is situated at Batalanda, Makola South, 12 kilometers away from Colombo. Its aim is to develop professional knowledge of senior officers of the Sri Lanka Army, Sri Lanka Navy & the Sri Lanka Air Force. The DSCSC was formerly known as the Sri Lanka Army Command and Staff College.

The Commandant is a two-star appointment and the current Commandant of the DSCSC Major General D K S K Dolage.

== Objectives ==
The above aim is met through addressing six principal objectives, which are as follows:

- Know and be able to apply the functions and techniques of staff in war and peace.
- Know and apply the principles and techniques involved in the employment of land forces in particular, and armed forces in general, in all types of military operations.
- Analyze the function of command up to and including divisional level.
- Know the structure, deployment, roles and interdependence of the Sri Lankan Armed Forces.
- Understand how the Sri Lankan defence policy is formulated and the relationship with military doctrine.
- Analyze those issues in national and international affairs, which influence the defence policies of Sri Lanka and her allies.

== History ==
=== Army Command and Staff College ===
Since the establishment of the Ceylon Army in 1949, mid career staff officers were sent to the British Army Staff College, Camberley and later to India's Defence Services Staff College, as well as other overseas staff colleges. With the rapid expansion of the army during the Sri Lankan Civil War, the need for more 'Staff Qualified' officers was felt as the army began mounting multi-division military operations. As a response to this need the army established the Army Command and Staff College (ACSC) on 16 March 1998 with the first course consisting of 26 Student Officers. The College was officially inaugurated on 28 August 1998 by President Chandrika Kumaratunga by the request of the Commander of the Army, Lieutenant General Rohan Daluwatte.

At the inception, a British Army Training Team consisting of two Lieutenant Colonels was attached, in order to assist the faculty to formulate a curriculum similar to the British Joint Services Command and Staff College, but with emphasis on local requirements providing required training material and fine tuning the local faculty's teaching skills. The faculty was driven through an ‘on the job’ Training Programme.

The ACSC was established with the aim of developing the professional knowledge and understanding of selected Student Officers both in command and on staff duties, for the Sri Lanka Army. However, a few selected Student Officers from the Sri Lanka Navy and Sri Lanka Air Force too were trained on Army Command and Staff aspects from ACSC Course No 1 onwards. During the 9 years of ACSC (1998-2006), the College produced 253 graduates, of whom 207 were from the Army, 22 were from the Navy, 21 from the Air Force and one from the Police. This was in contrast to 58 ‘Staff Qualified Graduates’ available in the Sri Lanka Army, in the year 1996. The change from ACSC to DSCSC could be perceived as an indication shown from the very inception on the importance of a Joint Services atmosphere. Moreover, the efforts of all military arms was felt imperative to be joint, in order to combat the adversary. Furthermore, changing tactics of adversaries compelled the military to revise its doctrines in war fighting, thus setting conditions for a sound ‘Joint environment’.

=== Defence Services Command and Staff College ===
On 22 January 2007, ACSC was re-designated as the Defence Services Command and Staff College, where all military doctrinal and strategic level planning and teachings were brought under one roof with Secretary to the President, Lalith Weeratunga serving as the Chief Guest. he first Commandant of DSCSC was Major General N A Ranasinghe RSP, VSV, USP, ndc, psc, Isc. DSCSC Course No 1 commenced immediately after the inauguration ceremony with 36 Student Officers from the Army, 8 Student Officers from the Navy and 10 Student Officers from the Air Force registering for the first course. The Student Officers from respective Services are functioning under three wings namely Army, Navy and Air, with greater emphasis on Joint Environment.

== The Course ==
The Defence Services Command and Staff Course sets out to train officers in basic command and staff techniques to develop the intellectual attributes to cope with their future appointments.

The training course at the DSCSC runs for a duration of 11 months. The course is meant for Army, Navy and air force field/senior officers in the ranks of major, lieutenant colonel, lieutenant commander, commander, squadron leader and wing commander. Officers who are recommended by their Regiment sand services for the course have to sit for a competitive entrance examination, after which a board of senior officers make final selections.

Upon completion of the Defence Services Command and Staff Course, officers can use the post nominal letters psc. Student officers who gain psc can opt to gained a Master of Science in Defence and Strategic Studies from the General Sir John Kotelawala Defence University if they have gained a Grade C and above for the subjects stipulated as Common and Wing Specific and in any two subjects excluding Commandant’s Research Paper.

=== Course contain and duration ===
Orientation Module (3 Weeks)

- English Writing, Reading and Public Speaking.
- Information Technology.
- Etiquette.
- Service Writing.
- Introduction to Arms.

Term 1 - Foundation Studies (10 Weeks)

- Arms and Services.
- Combat Service Support.
- Command, Command Support and Decision Making.
- Doctrine, Operations and War fighting.
- Intelligence Staff Duties.
- General Staff Duties.
- Logistic Staff Duties.
- Operations of War.
- Research Methodology.
- Sri Lanka Studies.

Term 2 - Operations of War (17 Weeks)

- Air Warfare.
- Military Assistance to Civil Authorities.
- Operations of War.
- Strategic Studies.
- International Affairs.
- Overseas Study Tour.

Term 3 - Joint Operations and Operations Other Than War (11 Weeks)

- Operations Other Than War Including Counter Insurgency (COIN).
- Management Studies.
- Maritime Warfare.
- Strategic Studies and International Affairs.
- ICRC Workshop on International Humanitarian Law (IHL).

Term 4 - Management and Technology (11 Weeks)

- Joint Operations.
- Management Studies.
- Military Technology.
- UN Peace Support Operations.
- Training for Operations.
- Security.
- Administrative Studies.
- Nuclear, Biological and Chemical Warfare.

== Facilities ==
=== Library ===
The DSCSC library comprises 3 sections; the Reference Library, Lending Library and Pamphlet Room. The Reference Library is open daily and contains both general and military reference material and periodicals. The Lending Library is open during weekdays; this is principally a military library with a small collection of books and periodicals of general interest. However the college is making arrangements to enhance its collection of books through purchases and donations.

=== Auditorium ===
Most central lectures and briefings are conducted in the auditorium, which has modern audio visual aid for the conduct of such activity. This auditorium is temporarily housed at its present location awaiting completion of construction work of a more spacious and modern premises.

=== Computer Laboratory ===
The DSCSC provides computer training to students during the Orientation module, with the aim of introducing them to the modern IT Environment. Basic applications such as Operating Systems, Microsoft Office applications, Hardware, Networking and the use of internet & Email are the part of the training.

=== Sports and Recreational Facilities ===
All student officers are encouraged to actively participate in sports and other extra curricular activities during their stay at the DSCSC. Student officers will have to qualify in the Staff College Physical Assessment tests conducted every term. The following sports facilities are available in the College. Student officers also make use of the facilities available at the Sugathadasa National Indoor Complex.

== Commandants ==
The following have commanded the college:

- Major General A E D Wijendra
- Major General K J C Perera RWP RSP VSV USP rcds psc
- Major General G W W Perera RWP RSP USAWC psc
- Major General A M C W B Seneviratne USP ndc psc
- Major General N R Marambe RWP RSP USP psc
- Major General D S K Wijesooriya RWP RSP USP psc
- Major General S Wanigasekera RWP RSP USP psc
- Major General D V S Y Kulatunga RSP USP ndc psc
- Major General L Fernando RWP RSP ndu psc
- Major General N A Ranasinghe RSP VSV USP ndc psc Isc
- Major General J C Rambukpotha RSP USP ndc psc IG
- Major General Janaka Walgama RSP VSV USP ndu psc
- Major General G V D U A Perera RWP RSP VSV USP USAWC M.Sc. (Ind) M.Sc. (USA) NDU-CT (USA) psc (SL) psc (Ind)
- Major General K A D A Karunasekara RWP RSP VSV USP ndu psc
- Major General Jeewaka Ruwan Kulatunga RSP ndc psc
- Major General DAPN Dematanpitiya ndu psc
- Major General IHMNN Herath
- Major General BKGML Rodrigo
- Major General D K S K Dolage

== Notable alumni ==
- General Shavendra Silva - Chief of Defence Staff and Commander of the Sri Lankan Army
- General Kamal Gunaratne - Secretary to the Ministry of Defence
- Air Vice Marshal Sampath Thuyacontha - Secretary to the Ministry of Defence
- Major General Jagath Gunawardena - Chief of Staff of the Sri Lankan Army
- Major General Jagath Alwis - Commander Security Forces Headquarters - Jaffna
- Rear Admiral Y. N. Jayarathna - Commandant of the Naval and Maritime Academy

== See also ==
- National Defence College, Sri Lanka
- Ministry of Defence
- General Sir John Kotelawala Defence University
- Sri Lanka Army
- Sri Lanka Navy
- Sri Lanka Air Force
- The Crest of The Sri Lanka Army Command and Staff College
