= Jeewaka Ruwan Kulatunga =

Sri Lankan general

Major General Jeewaka Ruwan Kulatunga RSP
- Born: Colombo, Sri Lanka
- Military career
- Allegiance: Sri Lanka
- Branch: Sri Lanka Army
- Service years: 1984 – 2019
- Rank: Major General
- Unit: Sri Lanka Light Infantry
- Commands: Chief of National Intelligence, Commandant, Defence Services Command and Staff College, Deputy Vice Chancellor, General Sir John Kotelawala Defence University
- Conflicts: Sri Lankan Civil War
- Awards: Rana Sura Padakkama

Major General Jeewaka Ruwan Kulatunga, RSP, ndc, psc, (also known as J R Kulatunga) is a retired Sri Lankan general. He served as the Chief of National Intelligence having served as the Commandant of the Defence Services Command and Staff College and the Deputy Vice Chancellor of the General Sir John Kotelawala Defence University.

== Early life ==
Born in Colombo, Kulatunga was educated at Nalanda College Colombo.

== Military career ==
Ruwan joined army in 1984 as an officer cadet, receiving his basic training at the Sri Lanka Military Academy and was commissioned on 16 December 1985 as a Second lieutenant in the 1st Battalion, Sri Lanka Light Infantry. He held platoon and company level command, seeing combat in the Sri Lankan Civil War. He graduated from the Special Forces Training School in North Carolina and the University of Malaya in Strategic and Defence Studies obtaining PSC.

=== Senior command ===
Kulatunga commanded an infantry battalion in Jaffna and Vanni during the height of the operations against the Tamil Tigers. His staff appointments included Colonel, General Staff of the 53 Infantry Division (Reserve Strike Force) from 2002 to 2003. Later in December 2005 he was appointed an Infantry Brigade Commander, an appointment which he held until September 2007 in Muhamalei, Jaffna. During war Kulatunga was the Commandant of Jaffna Town Sector responsible for coordinating civil affairs and administration in the peninsula.

He is a graduate of National Defense College of the Philippines in National Security Administration. He was the Commander, 55 Infantry division in 2012 in Jaffna.

Major General Kulatunga also held several notable appointments such as commandant of Sri Lanka Military Academy, military assistant to the Commander of the Army (Sri Lanka), director of operations at the Army Headquarters.

=== Chief of National Intelligence ===
In June 2019, he was appointed to Chief of National Intelligence by President Sirisena succeeding Sisira Mendis who resigned after giving testimony that the Parliamentary select committee to inquire into the 2019 Sri Lanka Easter bombings which had outraged President Sirisena.
