= Kumarasinghe =

Kumarasinghe is both a given name and a surname. Notable people with the name include:

- Kumarasinghe Sirisena (born 1962), Sri Lankan business executive
- Charitha Kumarasinghe (born 1992), Sri Lankan cricketer
- Dilshi Kumarasinghe (born 1999), Sri Lankan track and field athlete
- Geetha Kumarasinghe (born 1955), Sri Lankan film actress
- Shashikala Kumarasinghe (born 1984), Sri Lankan archer
