= Jagath Alwis =

Sri Lankan senior army general

- Military career
- Branch: Sri Lanka Army
- Rank: Major General
- Unit: Gajaba Regiment
- Commands: Commander Security Forces Headquarters - Jaffna
- Conflicts: JVP Insurrection 1987-89, Sri Lankan Civil War
- Awards: Rana Wickrama Padakkama, Rana Sura Padakkama, Uttama Seva Padakkama
- Other work: Secretary to the Ministry of Public Security, Chief of National Intelligence

Major General K. Jagath Alwis, RWP, RSP, USP is a retired Sri Lankan senior army officer. He served as the Secretary to the Ministry of Public Security, former Chief of National Intelligence, Commander Security Forces Headquarters - Jaffna and the Colonel Commandant of the Military Intelligence Corps. He had served as Sri Lankan Deputy Ambassador to Israel and Commander of the President's Guard. Currently he is the Secretary to the Ministry of Public Security.

== Military career ==
Educated at Ananda College, Colombo, Alwis joined the army as a cadet officer and was commissioned as a second lieutenant in the Gajaba Regiment. He is a graduate of the National Defence College and Defence Services Command and Staff College.

He has held several senior commands such as Commander of the President's Guard and Director General - General Staff at Army Headquarters. He had also served as Sri Lankan Deputy Ambassador to Israel. In 2014 he was appointed as Commander Security Forces Headquarters Jaffna, one of the most senior commands in the Sri Lankan military. Following his retirement from the army, he served as Chief of National Intelligence prior to his appointment as Secretary to the Ministry of Public Security.
