= Tuan Rizli Meedin =

Sri Lankan Army officer

Colonel Tuan Rizly Meedin † RSP
- Born: July 27, 1966; Hambantota
- Died: October 29, 2005 (aged 39); National Hospital of Sri Lanka, Colombo
- Military career
- Allegiance: Sri Lanka
- Branch: Sri Lanka Army
- Service years: 1986–2005
- Rank: Colonel (Posthumously)
- Units: Military Intelligence Corps, Sri Lanka Light Infantry
- Commands: 2 Military Intelligence Corps
- Conflicts: Sri Lankan Civil War
- Awards: Rana Sura Padakkama

Colonel Tuan Rizly Meedin (27 July 1966 – 29 October 2005) was a Sri Lanka Army officer and intelligence officer who, while serving as the Senior Staff Officer, RHQ, Military Intelligence Corps, was assassinated by the Liberation Tigers of Tamil Eelam during the ceasefire and peace process.

== Early life ==
Born 27 July 1966 in Hambantota to Falick Meedin and Rameena Meedin, he had two brothers and two sisters. His brothers were Major General Tuan Fadyl Meedin and Squadron Leader Tuan Akram Meedin.

== Military career ==
Following his elder brothers, Meedin joined the Sri Lanka Army Regular Intake 23 in 1986 as a cadet officer and received his basic military officer training at the Sri Lanka Military Academy in Diyatalawa. He was then commissioned as a second lieutenant to the 3rd Battalion, Sri Lanka Light Infantry and was promoted to lieutenant in 1989. He was then transferred to Military Intelligence Corps following its formation in 1990 and was attached to the Directorate of Military Intelligence. Lieutenant Colonel Meedin went on to serve as the commanding officer of the 2 Military Intelligence Corps.

== Assassination ==
On 29 October 2005, Meedin met two of his informants, Andrahennedige Chaminda Roshan alias Ice Manju and Chamley at his home and draw off in his car. Around 10.15 pm Ice Manju shot Meedin with a 7.62 micro pistol in his car in Kiribathgoda. Chamley called Meedin's wife informing her that he was shot. The wounded and unconscious Meedin was admitted to the Colombo General Hospital by his brother Brigadier Tuan Fadyl Meedin several hours after the shooting where he died at 1:30 am the following day. Ice Manju had been a double agent working for the Liberation Tigers of Tamil Eelam Trincomalee leader Soosaipillai Joseph Anthonydas, alias Sornam. Following the shooting, Ice Manju had fled to a LTTE controlled area and had reportedly gone missing at the end of the Sri Lankan Civil War in 2009. Meedin was buried at the Muslim Burial Ground Makola on 30 October 2005 and was posthumously promoted to the rank of colonel.

== Family ==
Meedin was married to Shamina and they had two daughters: Rishanya and Shiranya.

== Honors and decorations ==

	Rana Sura Padakkama	Desha Puthra Sammanaya	
Purna Bhumi Padakkama	North and East Operations Medal	Vadamarachchi Operation Medal	
Riviresa Campaign Services Medal	50th Independence Anniversary Commemoration Medal	Sri Lanka Army 50th Anniversary Medal	Sri Lanka Armed Services Long Service Medal

== See also ==
- Tuan Nizam Muthaliff
