= Department for Registration of Persons =

Government agency in Sri Lanka from 1971

- පුද්ගලයන් ලියාපදිංචි කිරීමේ දෙපාර්තමේන්තුව ஆட்களைப் பதிவு செய்யும் திணைக்களம்

Agency overview
- Formed: October 1, 1971; 54 years ago
- Jurisdiction: Government of Sri Lanka
- Headquarters: Floor 10, Suhurupaya, Sri Subhuthipura road, Battaramulla; 6.903078°N 79.917229°E
- Employees: 1157 (2016)
- Annual budget: Rs 674 million (2016)
- Minister responsible: S. B. Nawinne, Minister of Internal Affairs, Wayamba Development and Cultural Affairs
- Agency executive: Viyani Gunathilaka, Commissioner General
- Parent department: Ministry of Internal Affairs, Wayamba Development and Cultural Affairs
- Key document: Registration Of Persons Act, No. 32 of 1968
- Website: drp.gov.lk

The Department for Registration of Persons (Sinhala: පුද්ගලයින් ලියාපදිංචි කිරීමේ දෙපාර්තමේන්තුව Pudgalayin Liyapadinchi Kirimay Departhamenthuwa) is a government department within the Ministry of Internal Affairs of Sri Lanka, established in 1971. It deals with the registration of persons and the issue of national identity cards, which are mandatory in many areas of public life in Sri Lanka.

== Establishment ==
The concept of registration of persons and issuing identity cards was the subject of an agreement made between India and Sri Lanka in 1954, The draft bill submitted to the Sri Lankan parliament in 1962 was passed as the Act of Registration of Persons No. 32 of 1968. With the aim of activating the provisions of this Act, the Department of Registration of Persons was established on 1 October 1971.

== History ==
The registration of legal residents over 18 years of age and issuing of identity cards was initiated according to the provisions of the 1968 Act. The first identity card was issued on 16 October 1972. Since then more than 23 million identity cards have been issued. The 1968 Act was amended by the Act No. 28 and 37 of 1971 and No. 11 of 1981. The 1981 amendment lowered the age of registration to 16 years.

Following the Election Special Provisions Act No. 14 of 2004, by which the national identity card would be required in future elections to prove the identity of a voter, a program to accelerate the issuing of identity cards and to computerise the Department was initiated in 2005. In parallel to this program, departmental activities were reorganized and the official title of the Commissioner was upgraded to "Commissioner General", together with other titles of positions.

== Changes to the national identity card ==
At first, black and white photographs were used for the identity card, but since July 2005, colour photographs have been in use.

In place of the hand-written identity card, computer printed identity cards began to be issued in December 2008 to first-time applicants born after 1 January 1991 and aged 16 or over.

== Mandatory uses of the identity card ==
National identity cards are now essential for all examinations, and in obtaining pensions, provident funds, passports, and driving licenses.

== Change of ministries ==
This department, which was formerly under the Ministry of Defence, is now part of the Ministry of Interior.
