= Sri Lankan cyber security community =

The Cyber security (or information assurance) community in Sri Lanka is diverse, with many stakeholder groups contributing to support the National Information and Cyber Security Strategy. The following is a list of some of these stakeholders.

== Government ==
=== Computer Emergency Response Team ===
Established under the Information and Communication Technology Agency in 2006, the Sri Lanka Computer Emergency Response Team (SLCERT) now functions incidentally as a government own private company under the preview of the Ministry of Digital Infrastructure and Information Technology providing the services of a computer emergency response team.

=== Finance Sector Computer Security Incident Response Team ===
The Finance Sector Computer Security Incident Response Team (FINCSIRT) specializes in computer security relating to the banking and financial industry in Sri Lanka. It is a joint initiative between the Central Bank of Sri Lanka, SLCERT and the Sri Lankan Bankers Association.

=== National Cyber Security Agency ===
A National Cyber Security Agency has been proposed under the draft Cyber Security Bill.

== See also ==
- Sri Lankan intelligence agencies
