= Tuan Nizam Muthaliff =

Sri Lankan Army Officer

Colonel Tuan Nizam Muthaliff † RWP
- Colonel Tuan Nizam Muthaliff
- Born: July 11, 1966; Kalubowila
- Died: May 31, 2005 (aged 38); Polhengoda, Colombo
- Military career
- Allegiance: Sri Lanka
- Branch: Sri Lanka Army
- Service years: 1986–2005 †
- Rank: Colonel (Posthumously)
- Service number: O/60727
- Units: Military Intelligence Corps, Gemunu Watch
- Commands: 1st Military Intelligence Corps, Intelligence Security Group, Jaffna
- Conflicts: Sri Lankan Civil War
- Awards: Rana Wickrama Padakkama

Colonel Tuan Nizam Muthaliff, RWP, MI (July 12, 1966 – May 31, 2005) was a Sri Lanka Army officer and intelligence officer who, while serving as the commanding officer, 1 Military Intelligence Corps, was assassinated by the Liberation Tigers of Tamil Eelam (LTTE) during the ceasefire and peace process.

== Early life and education ==
Born to a Malay family in Trincomalee, Muthaliff was educated at D. S. Senanayake College, Colombo where he excelled in both studies and sports.

== Military career ==
=== Early career ===
Having completed his schooling, Muthaliff joined the Sri Lanka Army as a cadet officer in June 1986. He first underwent basic training at the Sri Lanka Military Academy in Diyatalawa and subsequently received officer training at the Pakistan Military Academy. On completing his training, he was commissioned as a second lieutenant in the 4th Battalion, Gemunu Watch and took part in military operations such as the Vadamarachchi Operation. He was promoted to the rank of lieutenant on June 2, 1989.

=== Military intelligence ===
From 1990, he was attached to the Military Intelligence Unit of the Joint Operations Command which later became the Directorate of Military Intelligence and he was transferred to the Military Intelligence Corps with its formation in 1990. He was promoted to the rank of captain on July 2, 1992, and afterwards to major on July 2, 1995. During this time he had served as general staff officer III (Intelligence) at Army Headquarters; officer commanding, Military intelligence training section; group commander, Intelligence Security Group in Jaffna for about three and a half years, group commander at the Directorate of Military Intelligence in Colombo for about three years since 1997 and general staff officer I (intelligence) in Vavuniya from 2000 to 2001. He underwent several foreign training courses, such as the Intelligence Staff Course and Counter Intelligence Course at the Directorate General of Forces Intelligence, Bangladesh; the Junior Command Course at the Army War College, Mhow India; South Asian Peace Keeping Course in Hawaii and the International Intelligence course in the USA. He was appointed commanding officer, 1 Military Intelligence Corps in November 2004. At the time of death he was also head of the Colombo Cell. Muthaliff had provided vital intelligence for major military operations such as Operation Balavegaya, Operation Jayasikurui and provided Brigadier Janaka Perera with critical information forewarning him of the LTTE attack on Weli Oya. The LTTE had attempted to assassinate Muthaliff in two previous occasions, with gunmen in Vavuniya and with a suicide bomber in Jaffna.

== Assassination ==
Muthaliff was shot dead in his car by LTTE gunmen at Polhengoda junction in Narahenpita, Colombo at 7:45 AM on 31 May 2005. He was traveling from his home in Manning Town, Narahenpita to the Kotelawala Defence Academy, where he was taling a course in computer science. Traveling in an unmarked civilian car with a civilian chauffeur provided by the army, gunmen trailed him on a motorcycle, when it stopped at the traffic lights at the Polhengoda junction in front of the military police headquarters they shot Muthaliff 18 times while he sat in the rear seat of the car. The Sri Lanka Army accused the LTTE of the assassination.

In recognition of his service to the army, Muthaliff was posthumously promoted to the rank of lieutenant colonel with effect from 1 May 2005 and to the rank of colonel with effect from 31 May 2005. He was buried at the burial grounds of the Dehiwala Muhaideen Grand Jumma Mosque for Janaza on 1 June 2005 with full military honors.

=== Investigation ===
Police Criminal Investigation Department investigations into the attacks on Generals Sarath Fonseka and Parami Kulatunga, discovered LTTE links with organized crime groups in Colombo and military personnel who had collaborated with the LTTE for money. Major Manamendra Dassaendra Dassnayake was convicted of aiding and abetting the LTTE in the assassinations of Lieutenant General Parami Kulathunga, Colonel Tuan Rizli Meedin and Colonel Tuan Nizam Muthaliff.

== Awards and decorations ==

	Rana Wickrama Padakkama	
Purna Bhumi Padakkama	North and East Operations Medal	Vadamarachchi Operation Medal
Riviresa Campaign Services Medal	50th Independence Anniversary Commemoration Medal	Sri Lanka Armed Services Long Service Medal

Muthaliff gallantry in the battlefield and his work in intelligence earned him several awards, including the Rana Wickrama Padakkama. He also received the Sri Lanka Armed Services Long Service Medal, North and East Operations Medal, Purna Bhumi Padakkama, Operation Wadamarachchi Medal, Riviresa Campaign Services Medal, and the 50th Independence Anniversary Commemoration Medal for his military service.

== Family ==
Muthaliff married Kumudini Amarasinghe Muthaliff, who retired from the Sri Lanka Army in 2009 as a Lieutenant Colonel having served as the commanding officer, Sri Lanka Army Women's Corps. They had a daughter, Sarah and son, Maalik.

== See also ==
- Tuan Rizli Meedin
