= Sisira Mendis =

Sri Lankan police officer

- Born: Sri Lanka
- Relatives: Shamalee (wife); Namal (brother)
- Police career
- Country: Sri Lanka Police
- Allegiance: Sri Lanka
- Department: Criminal Investigation Department (Sri Lanka)
- Service years: 1975 - 2011
- Rank: Deputy Inspector-General of Police

Sisira Mendis was a Sri Lankan police officer. He was a former Deputy Inspector-General of Police and the Director of Criminal Investigation Department. Following his retirement from the Sri Lanka Police, he served as Chief of National Intelligence.

== Police career ==
After completing his secondary education at Nalanda College, Colombo, he joined the Sri Lanka Police in 1972 as an acting Sub Inspector. Mendis held numerous appointments as OIC of police stations in the north and east of the island.

In 1977, he was transferred to the Criminal Investigation Department and served as a detective, reaching the rank of Senior Superintendent of Police and Deputy Director CID. He was thereafter transferred as Senior Superintendent of Police, Vavuniya during the height of the war against the LTTE separatists. Returning to the CID, he was appointed Director CID and after his promotion to Deputy Inspector General, served as DIG in charge of the CID. His last appointment was Deputy Inspector General, Narcotic Bureau prior to his retirement in March 2011.

== Chief of National Intelligence ==
He was recalled from retirement, by President Sirisena who appointed him as Chief of National Intelligence (CNI) in July 2015. He resigned citing health reasons, on 8 June 2019, days after giving testimony that the Parliamentary select committee to inquire into the 2019 Sri Lanka Easter bombings which had outraged President Sirisena. He was succeeded by Major General Jeewaka Ruwan Kulatunga as CNI.
