= Rakna Arakshaka Lanka =

Government-owned Defence Company

Rakna Arakshaka Lanka Limited
- Type: Government-owned corporation
- Industry: Private security
- Founded: 2006; 20 years ago
- Founder: Gotabaya Rajapaksa
- Headquarters: No 143/A, Kirulapone Avenue, Colombo 05, Sri Lanka.
- Area served: Worldwide (mostly Asia)
- Key people: Major (Retd.) Dulath L. Wijetilleke (Chairman and CEO)
- Owner: Ministry of Defence
- Number of employees: 2,500 (2019)
- Website: rall.lk

Rakna Arakshaka Lanka also called Rakna Arakshaka Lanka LTD. under the companies Act No. 07 of 2007. Company was government own security service company. It's affiliations of the Ministry of Defence Sri Lanka. The company was founded by the former Secretary of the Ministry of Defence and former President of Sri Lanka Gotabaya Rajapaksa. The company mainly target the commercial sector. In 2016, cabinet approval has been granted to dissolve the company. But company return from the after 2019 Sri Lankan presidential election. Most employees are retired Army officers and Police officers. Approximately 2,500 security officers serving today.
