= North-East Rehabilitation and Development Organization =

- Abbreviation: NERDO
- Formation: July 9, 2010; 16 years ago
- Type: NGO
- Purpose: Transter the Sri Lankan Internally Displaced Persons (IDPs) out of the welfare centers and reintegrate them into society.
- Headquarters: Vavuniya, Sri Lanka
- Region served: Northern Province, Eastern Province, Sri Lanka
- Official language: Tamil, English
- Leader: Selvarasa Pathmanathan
- Main organ: Executive Committee
- Website: Official website

North-East Rehabilitation and Development Organization (NERDO) is a Non-Governmental Organization in Sri Lanka, created by Selvarasa Pathmanathan, the ex-chief arms procurer and leader of Liberation Tigers of Tamil Eelam (LTTE). After Selvarasa Pathmanathan alias KP was captured by Sri Lankan military intelligence operatives in Kuala Lumpur, Malaysia in August 2009, he was brought into Sri Lanka. Since then, as a result of confidence and understanding shared between Defence Secretary Gotabhaya Rajapaksa and KP, he began to collaborate with Sri Lankan Government. On 9 July 2010, KP registered his organization for the provision of relief to the Internally Displaced Persons (IDPs) while upgrading facilities for better physical, mental and living conditions for them. He also stated that one of the main objectives of NERDO was to upgrade education facilities of children. Thavaratnam Sinniah, president of the Jaffna District Fisheries Societies’ Federation acts as its chairman and KP as the secretary. NERDO is also involved in the reintegration process of former LTTE cadres. Its projects include building orphanages, vocational training centers, model farms etc. First NERDO operated children’s home Anpu Illam (Abode of Love) was declared open in Muthaiyankattu village, Mullaitivu in July 2011.

== See also ==
- Selvarasa Pathmanathan
