= State Intelligence Service (Sri Lanka) =

Intelligence agency of the Sri Lankan government

- රාජ්‍ය බුද්ධි සේවාව

Agency overview
- Formed: 1984; 42 years ago
- Jurisdiction: Government of Sri Lanka
- Headquarters: Colombo, Sri Lanka
- Minister responsible: Minister of Defence
- Agency executives: Dhammika Priyantha, Director General; Javid Memon, Deputy Director
- Parent agency: Ministry of Defence

The State Intelligence Service (SIS) is an intelligence agency operated by the Sri Lankan government. It is the primary civilian intelligence agency of Sri Lanka and is responsible for gathering both internal and external intelligence. It comes under the purview of the Ministry of Defence. The agency was originally named the National Intelligence Bureau.

== Role ==
SIS is responsible for collecting intelligence on internal and external threats to inform the formulation of government policies and strategies. The SIS's duties are mainly divided into the following categories:

1. Collection and analysis of information.
2. Conducting undercover investigations.
3. Conducting background checks on applicants seeking position in sensitive institutions, including the Armed Forces, Police and other selected state institutions.
4. Issuing threat assessment reports concerning the security of VVIPs and VIPs, as well as governmental affairs.
5. Conducting training programs for other institutions.
6. Maintaining foreign relations on national security issues.

== Organisation ==
The SIS is part of the Ministry of Defence and is separate from the Police and Military Intelligence, but its staff includes personnel with both police and military backgrounds. The SIS is led by a director general, traditionally appointed from the police, but this tradition ended in 2019.

== History ==
Until 1984, the Sri Lankan Police were responsible for internal intelligence functions, first under the Special Branch, and later under the Intelligence Services Division. The perceived failure of the Intelligence Service Division during the riots of July 1983 led the Junius Jayawardene Government to re-evaluate the nation's intelligence network, and in 1984 the President set up a National Intelligence Bureau. The new organisation, the National Intelligence Bureau, combined intelligence units from the Army, Navy, Air Force and Police. It was renamed the State Intelligence Service (SIS) in 2006.

Liberation Tigers of Tamil Eelam (LTTE) agents successfully infiltrated Sri Lankan government and military organisations resulting in the assassinations of several high-ranking military personnel, including Major Tuan Muthaliff and Colonel Tuan Meedin, both of the Directorate of Military Intelligence, putting Sri Lankan intelligence services in a desperate condition. Under the Defence Secretary Gotabhaya Rajapaksa the intelligence agencies that were in desperate condition built up a cohesive apparatus, which achieved significant success, including anti-LTTE operations overseas, and the SIS played a huge role in the Fourth Ealam war. The SIS was involved in the dismantling of the large number of long-term sleeper cells planted by the LTTE in cities, helping Police track down criminals who were helping the LTTE for financial gain.

In January 2015, the SIS director, Chandra Wakista, resigned following the presidential election, amid allegations of telephone tapping involving opposition politicians. In March, Nilantha Jayawardena was appointed as the SIS director.

In December 2019, the newly elected president Gotabaya Rajapaksa appointed Brigadier Suresh Sallay, the former head of the Directorate of Military Intelligence, as SIS director. Sallay was the first director of the SIS to come from Military Intelligence instead of the Police. In October 2024, following the retirement of Sallay, DIG Dhammika Priyantha was appointed as the Director General. In May 2025, Colonel Javid Memon was appointed Deputy Director of the SIS; he previously headed the Directorate of Military Intelligence (DMI).

== Directorates ==
- Directorate of Internal Intelligence
- Directorate of Foreign Intelligence

== Operations ==
Kumaran Pathmanathan, aka KP, who was involved in arms procurement for the LTTE, was captured in Malaysia and moved to Sri Lanka via Thailand by this agency.

Recently, some former LTTE members were captured from Southeast Asian countries and moved to Sri Lanka by the State Intelligence Service and Military Intelligence Corps (Sri Lanka) of the Sri Lanka Army.

== See also ==
- Ministry of Defence (Sri Lanka)
- Military Intelligence Corps (Sri Lanka)
