= Yagoda, Sri Lanka =

Yagoda යාගොඩ
- Town
- Location within Sri Lanka
- Coordinates: 7°4′14″N 79°58′8″E
- Country: Sri Lanka
- Province: Western Province
- Time zone: UTC+5:30 (Sri Lanka Standard Time Zone)

Yagoda (Sinhala: යාගොඩ) is a small town situated approximately 2 km (1.2 mi) from Gampaha and 21 km (13 mi) to the north-east of Colombo. It falls within the Gampaha Electorate.

== Transport ==
Yagoda is the 14th railway station from Colombo Fort on the Main Line, which links Colombo and Kandy.

== Notable individuals ==
- Maithripala Sirisena (7th President of Sri Lanka) - birthplace
