= Sirisena =

Sirisena is a surname. Notable people with the surname include:

- Maithripala Sirisena (born 1951), Sri Lankan politician
- Matarage Sirisena Amarasiri, Sri Lankan politician
- Sirisena Hettige, Sri Lankan politician
- H. G. Sirisena, Sri Lankan politician
