= Chief of National Intelligence =

The Chief of National Intelligence (CNI) is the Sri Lankan government official in-charge of directing and overseeing the intelligence agencies in Sri Lanka. Created in 2006, reporting to the Permanent Secretary to the Ministry of Defence, CNI is a member of the National Security Council of Sri Lanka, coordinating the work of intelligence agencies in the country.

== Chief of National Intelligence (2006–present) ==
- Major General Kapila Hendawitharana
- Sisira Mendis (retired DIG)
- Major General Jeewaka Ruwan Kulatunga
- Major General Jagath Alwis

== See also ==
- Sri Lankan intelligence agencies
- Director of National Intelligence – American counterpart
