= Crest of The Sri Lanka Army Command and Staff College =

The Crest of The Sri Lanka Army Command and Staff College

The Crest of The Sri Lanka Army Command and Staff College consists of the Wise Old Owl appears in the legends of King Arthur, where Merlin is described as having an owl perched on his shoulder. Owls generally became widely accepted as symbols of learning and in the Middle Ages knowledge was vastly vested in the clergy and alchemists. During this time the owl became the companion of the wise.

In Roman mythology, Minerva is the goddess of war and wisdom. Her favorite bird was the owl. Most Staff Colleges have adopted Minerva's Owl as their crest. In keeping with tradition we too have selected the owl, in the Sri Lankan context, Sri Lankan Fish Owl for our crest. The motto "To War With Wisdom and Knowledge". The owl is perched on two crossed swords at rest which implies that the sword will only be used as the last resort.
