= Nilantha Jayawardena =

Senior Deputy Inspector-General of Police in Sri Lanka

- Born: Sri Lanka
- Police career
- Department: Sri Lanka Police
- Rank: Senior Deputy Inspector-General of Police

Nilantha Jayawardena (also known as D. P. Nilantha Jayawardena) is a Senior Deputy Inspector-General of Police in Sri Lanka and Chief of State Intelligence Service (Sri Lanka).

== Early life and education ==
Nilantha was educated at Nalanda College Colombo.

Senior DIG Jayawardena holds a Bachelor of Commerce degree, a Business Management Postgraduate Degree and a Diploma in Conflict Resolution

Nilantha is the youngest DIG in Sri Lanka Police history

== Career ==
Nilantha Jayawardena joined Sri Lanka Police as Assistant Superintendent of Police In July 2025, the Sri Lankan National Police Commission officially dismissed Nilantha Jayawardena, former Senior Deputy Inspector‑General of Police and head of the State Intelligence Service, following findings that he had been negligent in responding to intelligence ahead of the Easter Sunday bombings on 21 April 2019. The dismissal came after a formal disciplinary inquiry concluded he failed to act on critical warnings and was placed on compulsory leave in July 2024.
