= Selvarasa Pathmanathan =

Sri Lankan criminal (born 1955)

Shanmugam Kumaran Tharmalingam
- Born: Shanmugam Kumaran Tharmalingam; 6 April 1955 (age 71); Kankesanthurai, Dominion of Ceylon
- Other names: Selvarasa Pathmanathan; Kumaran Pathmanathan and many others
- Status: Arrested by Sri lankan intelligence agents on 5 August 2009 and brought to Sri Lanka. Released on 17 October 2012.
- Criminal charges: Criminal conspiracy, arms smuggling and for the violation of the Indian Terrorist Act and the Indian Explosive Act. Assassination of Rajiv Gandhi.

Shanmugam Kumaran Tharmalingam (Tamil: ஷண்முகம் குமாரன் தர்மலிங்கம்; alias Selvarasa Pathmanathan, Kumaran Pathmanathan, or simply KP; born 6 April 1955) is a former prominent member of the Liberation Tigers of Tamil Eelam (LTTE). Pathmanathan was on Interpol's most wanted list for various charges including arms smuggling and criminal conspiracy. He is also wanted by India's law enforcement agencies in connection with the assassination of former Indian Prime Minister Rajiv Gandhi in 1991 and for violation of the Terrorist Act and the Indian Explosive Act. He was arrested on 5 August 2009. Pathmanathan was released from prison on 17 October 2012, when the complaints against him by Sri Lanka were withdrawn.

== Early life ==
Little information is available on Pathmanthan's early life. He was born Shanmugam Kumaran Tharmalingam on 6 April 1955 in the town of Kankesanthurai in the Jaffna District of Ceylon. Pathmanathan, who can converse in Tamil, English, French and Sinhala is known to have left Sri Lanka in 1983.

== Aliases ==
Pathmanathan is known to use more than 23 aliases and masks. In addition, his last name can be spelled as Padmanadan or Pathmanaban or Pathmanadan or Pathmanathan, hence there are numerous variations of his name.

== Involvement in LTTE ==
=== Fund raising activities ===
Pathmanathan was one of the top LTTE officials and the chief procurer of arms for the organization. He ran a global network of LTTE offices which were engaged in its weapons procurement, logistics and money laundering operations.

Initially based in Malaysia, where he set up a shipping company in 1987, he was forced to move out after the Malaysian Special Branch cracked down on LTTE activities in the country in 1990, culminating in the seizure of an LTTE ship the same year. Pathmanathan then moved to Thailand, which became a safe haven for the LTTE. There he established himself as the head of banking, procurement and shipping for the LTTE. He is believed to have obtained citizenship in Thailand.

According to a report by Jane's Intelligence Review:

"While Cambodia is the hub of the LTTE East Asia Network, Thailand continues to serve as the most important country for trans-shipment of munitions and coordination of logistics... its excellent communications infrastructure, proximity to former war zones in both Cambodia and Burma and its western coastline facing the Bay of Bengal and Sri Lanka beyond have made Thailand the ancient interface between the LTTE's war zone."

In Thailand Pathmanathann set up and led the "KP Department", the procurement arm of the LTTE, the oldest international wing of the organisation. He was responsible for equipping the rebels with a modern-day arsenal which enabled them to challenge the Sri Lankan Military and to fight a high intensity war. He procured modern hardware, paid for them through secret bank accounts, and shipped them to the rebels using a merchant shipping network operated by the "KP Department", known as the "sea pigeons". Apart from setting up a number of lucrative businesses in Thailand, Pathmanathan established a state-of-the-art boatyard in the country, which manufactured over a dozen different boats, including mini-submarines and suicide boats.

The "KP Department" was complemented by another international wing of the LTTE called the "Aiyanna Group". While the "KP Department" acted as the procurement arm of the LTTE, the Aiyanna Group looked after the fund raising and intelligence operations of the organization. Jane's Intelligence Review estimated in 2007 that the LTTE earns between $200–300 million per year through their fund-raising activities and numerous illegal businesses.

The heads of both departments operated under the direct guidance of the LTTE leader Velupillai Prabhakaran and intelligence head Pottu Amman, both of whom were also on the Interpol most wanted list.

=== Rajiv Gandhi assassination ===
On 21 May 1991, former Indian Prime Minister Rajiv Gandhi was assassinated by a suicide bomber at a public meeting in Sriperumbudur, Tamil Nadu. The assassination was carried out by the LTTE suicide bomber Thenmuli Rajaratnam, also known as Dhanu, who detonated an RDX explosive-laden belt tucked below her dress as she bent down to greet him.

Intelligence agencies believe that Pathmanathan had links with the planning of the assassination of Rajiv Gandhi. The Indian Central Bureau of Investigation (CBI) approached 23 countries in 2001 requesting information regarding LTTE members who they believed were linked with the assassination of Rajiv Gandhi. Sweden, where Pathmanathan was believed to be hiding at the time, was one of the countries.

The Interpol Headquarters in Lyon, France, also issued a red notice against Pathmanathan, which requests member states to arrest the suspect and hold him for extradition. The notice stated, "Tharmalingam (Pathmanathan) is alleged to have been involved in the murder of Rajiv Gandhi on 21 May 1991 in Tamil Nadu, India."

=== Intended presence at peace negotiations ===
Following the signing of a ceasefire agreement between the Sri Lankan Government and the LTTE in 2002, the LTTE nominated Pathmanathan as a member of its delegation to the Peace Talks scheduled with the government in late 2003. They passed on a request, through Norwegian facilitators of the negotiations, to find out whether the Government had any objections to "Shanmugam Kumaran Tharmalingam" being part of the delegation. The Government rejected the request, mainly because he was wanted in India for links with Rajiv Gandhi's assassination, and letting him join the delegation would have ruptured relations between the two nations.

The LTTE's reasons for nominating Pathmanathan to the delegations are unclear but most likely were linked to him being sought by Interpol, CIA and MI5. Being on the list of peace negotiators would have meant, with Sri Lanka's approval, Pathmanathan would no longer be one of the world's most wanted men.

=== Department of International Relations ===
In January 2009 Pathmanathan was appointed head of the newly created "Department of International Relations". He was LTTE's chief international spokesman during the last months of the civil war. He urged Prabhakaran who was trapped in the No Fire Zone to escape and promised that he could break the naval blockade. Prabhakaran did not directly talk with KP due to suspicions that the military intelligence was monitoring his communications. He also talked to Charles Anthony who instead requested more weapons. KP attempted to hire a helicopter with Ukrainian mercenary pilots but could not arrange the funds from Scandinavian agents. It was also doubted if a rescue of the LTTE leadership was even possible as a previous attempt by the Sea Tigers to break through the naval blockade resulted in a disaster with only two suicide craft making it past the first line of Arrow boats only to be destroyed by the Dvoras of the second line. Further the land routes were surrounded and constant air patrols monitored the air space.

=== Leader of the LTTE ===
Pathmanathan was left as the most senior LTTE member following the death of most of the LTTE's leadership, including Prabhakaran, in the final stages of the civil war. On 21 July 2009 a statement was issued, allegedly from the executive committee of the LTTE, stating that Pathmanathan had been appointed leader of the LTTE.

Pathmanathan claimed to a Channel 4 interview that he has 1500-2000 LTTE members hiding in the jungles of Sri Lanka who had ceased hostilities for now but are awaiting his orders to restart the war.

== Fugitive status ==
Pathmanathan was the subject of a worldwide manhunt, which involved police from cities including Johannesburg, Yangon, Singapore and Bangkok. Some of the world's foremost intelligence agencies, including the American CIA, India RAW and British MI5, were on his trail. He was believed to have had bank accounts in London, Frankfurt, Denmark, Athens and Australia and over 200 passports for his use. In May 2011, he alleged that the United Nations and a "western country" worked to help many LTTE operatives escape from Sri Lanka.

Known as an elusive, secretive individual, he helped keep a low profile by having direct contact only with LTTE leader Velupillai Prabhakaran.

== Arrest ==
There were conflicting reports from Thailand that Pathmanathan had been arrested on 11 September 2007. The reports were preceded by the detention in Ranong Province of three other LTTE operatives the month before, for trying to buy guns and 45,000 rounds of ammunition. However a number of Thai officials rejected the reports, claiming they had no information about such an arrest. Thai immigration officers claimed that no such person had entered the country in the last two years.

Pathmanathan was arrested in a South East Asian country on 5 August 2009. Initial reports suggested that he was captured in Thailand, but this was denied by Thai authorities. But it was later revealed that he had been arrested by Sri Lankan State Intelligence Service agents and a covert Sri Lankan military intelligence unit, with the cooperation of local authorities, in the Tune Hotel, downtown Kuala Lumpur, Malaysia. The Sri Lankan Government announced on 7 August that he had been brought to Colombo. Sources have termed him "crucial" to the uncovering of various Liberation Tigers of Tamil Eelam crime networks.

After his arrest he began cooperating with the Sri Lanka government. On 9 July 2010, Pathmanathan established the North-East Rehabilitation and Development Organization (NERDO), a Non-Governmental Organization for the provision of relief to the Internally Displaced Persons (IDPs) while upgrading facilities for better physical, mental and living conditions for them. In October 2012, media sources reported that Pathmanathan was being released from custody, quoting the head of Media Center for National Security Lakshman Hulugalle. Later he rejected the reports by saying Pathmanathan who is under special protection was permitted to engage in his NGO work and has not been released as claimed by media.
