= Kumarasinghe Sirisena =

Sri Lankan business executive (born 1962)

P.G. Kumarasinghe Sirisena
- P.G. Kumarasinghe Sirisena

Former Group Chairman of Sri Lanka Telecom

Personal details
- Education: University of Sri Jayawardanapura

Pallewatta Gamaralalage Kumarasinghe Sirisena (born 18 February 1962), sometimes known as P. G. Kumarasinghe, is a Sri Lankan business executive and former Group Chairman of Sri Lanka Telecom. He is the younger brother of the former President of Sri Lanka, Maithripala Sirisena.

Sirisena served as general manager of the Sri Lankan State Timber Corporation from 2005 until November 2014, with his position being terminated after the beginning of his brother's presidential campaign.

Subsequent to his brother's electoral victory, Sirisena was appointed the chairman of Sri Lanka Telecom — an appointment which the Colombo Telegraph called "controversial", while conceding that Sirisena has the requisite education and professional experience for the position. The Sunday Leader later revealed that the President had appointed Sirisena despite the objections of Prime Minister Ranil Wickremesinghe and several members of his cabinet.

Sirisena was also his brother's coordinating secretary in 2005, when his brother served as Leader of the House in the Parliament of Sri Lanka.

== Education ==
Sirisena received his secondary education at Bandaranayake College Gampaha. He holds a master's degree in Business Administration from the Wayamba University of Sri Lanka and a bachelor's degree in Business Administration from University of Sri Jayawardanapura.
