= Military Intelligence Corps (Sri Lanka) =

- යුද්ධ හමුදා බුද්ධි බලකාය
- Active: 1990 - Present
- Country: Sri Lanka
- Branch: Sri Lanka Army
- Type: Military intelligence unit
- Size: 8 Battalions
- Regimental Headquarters: Karandeniya
- Mottos: නැණ රණ ජය; Næna Rana Jaya (Sinhala: wisdom, Battle, Victory)
- Colors
- March: Semper Fidelis
- Engagements: Sri Lankan Civil War

The Military Intelligence Corps (MIC) is one of the corps of the Sri Lanka Army. It is responsible for clandestine and covert operations to gathering military intelligence, counter-intelligence, cyberwarfare, HUMINT, intelligence assessment, ISTAR, military intelligence gathering and analysis, military secrets security, and SIGINT.

== Regular battalions ==
- 1st Military Intelligence Corps
- 2nd Military Intelligence Corps
- 4th Military Intelligence Corps
- 5th Military Intelligence Corps

== Volunteer battalions ==
- 3rd (V) Military Intelligence Corps (Formed on 21 April 2004)
- 6th (V) Military Intelligence Corps (Formed on 14 January 2011)

== Notable members ==
- General Lionel Balagalle - former Commander of the Army and founder of the Military Intelligence Corps
- Major General Laksiri Waduge RWP RSP VSV USP ndu - former Colonel commandant of the Military Intelligence Corps
- Major General S.D. Thennakoon - former Colonel commandant of the Military Intelligence Corps
- Major General H.K.G. Hendavitharana - former Chief of National Intelligence and Colonel commandant of the Military Intelligence Corps
- Major General A.S.P. Zaheer - former Colonel commandant of the Military Intelligence Corps
- Colonel Tuan Nizam Muthaliff † - former Commanding Officer of the 1st Military Intelligence Corps.
- Colonel Tuan Rizli Meedin † - former Commanding Officer of the 2nd Military Intelligence Corps.

== Order of precedence ==
Preceded by Special Forces Regiment	Order of Precedence	Succeeded by Engineer Services Regiment

== See also ==
- Long Range Reconnaissance Patrol (Sri Lanka)
- State Intelligence Service (Sri Lanka)
- Intelligence Corps (United Kingdom)

== External links and sources ==
- Sri Lanka Army
- Military Intelligence Corps
