= Directorate of Military Intelligence (Sri Lanka) =

Intelligence arm of the Sri Lankan armed forces

The Directorate of Military Intelligence is the intelligence arm of the Sri Lankan armed forces. Elite Special Forces Long Range Reconnaissance Patrol unit operates under the Directorate of Military Intelligence of the Army.

== Director of Military Intelligence ==
- Brigadier Lionel Balagalle
- Brigadier Shantha Kottegoda
- Brigadier Kapila Hendawitharana
- Brigadier Suresh Sallay
- Brigadier Robin Jayasuriya
- Colonel. S Javid Memon
- Colonel. Pushpa Kumara

== See also ==
- State Intelligence Service (Sri Lanka)
- Military Intelligence Corps (Sri Lanka)

== References and external links ==
- Men who killed Thamilselvam speak
