= Ministry of Defence (Sri Lanka) =

Government ministry of Sri Lanka

Agency overview
- Formed: 1948; 78 years ago
- Preceding agency: Ministry of External Affairs and Defence
- Jurisdiction: Government of Sri Lanka
- Headquarters: Defence Headquarters Complex; 6.929710°N 79.844905°E
- Annual budget: LKR 404 billion (2025)
- Minister responsible: Anura Kumara Dissanayake, Minister of Defence
- Agency executive: Air vice-marshal Sampath Thuyacontha, Ministry Secretary
- Child agencies: Civil Security Department; Sri Lanka Coast Guard; Defence Services Command and Staff College; General Sir John Kotelawala Defence University; Defence Services School; National Cadet Corps; Rakna Arakshaka Lanka
- Website: defence.lk

The Ministry of Defence (Sinhala: රාජ්‍ය ආරක්ෂක අමාත්‍යාංශය Rājya ārakshaka amāthyanshaya; Tamil: பாதுகாப்பு அமைச்சகம்) is the cabinet ministry of the Government of Sri Lanka responsible for implementation of government defence policy and acts as the overall headquarters of the Sri Lankan Armed Forces.

The Ministry of Defence states that its principal objectives are the formulation, co-ordination and the execution of policies in relation to the national security. With the end of the Cold War, the MOD does not foresee any short-term conventional military threat, the main threat to Sri Lanka having been the now-defunct organisation, the LTTE and Islamic terrorism. The Ministry of Defence also manages day-to-day running of the armed forces, contingency planning and defence procurement.

The National Security Council of Sri Lanka is the executive body of the Sri Lankan government that is charged with the maintenance of national security with authority to direct the Sri Lankan military and Police. The Minister of Defence and the Permanent Secretary of the Ministry of Defence are permanent members of the National Security Council.

== History ==
With Ceylon gaining independence in 1948, the Ministry of External Affairs and Defence was formed to administer the country's armed forces and formulate defence and foreign policy. The Prime Minister was also the Minister of Defence and External Affairs, and was supported by a Parliamentary Secretary for Defence and External Affairs who was a member of Parliament.

In 1977, J.R Jayawardena's government adapted two separate ministries, forming the Ministry of Defence and the Ministry of Foreign Affairs were formed. Since then many presidents retained the portfolio of Minister of Defence under him/her self, except for a few brief periods. In 1999 the National Security Council was established removing the direct control the military from the deputy Minister of Defence.

In 2011, the ministry was renamed Ministry of Defence and Urban Development.

== Funding ==
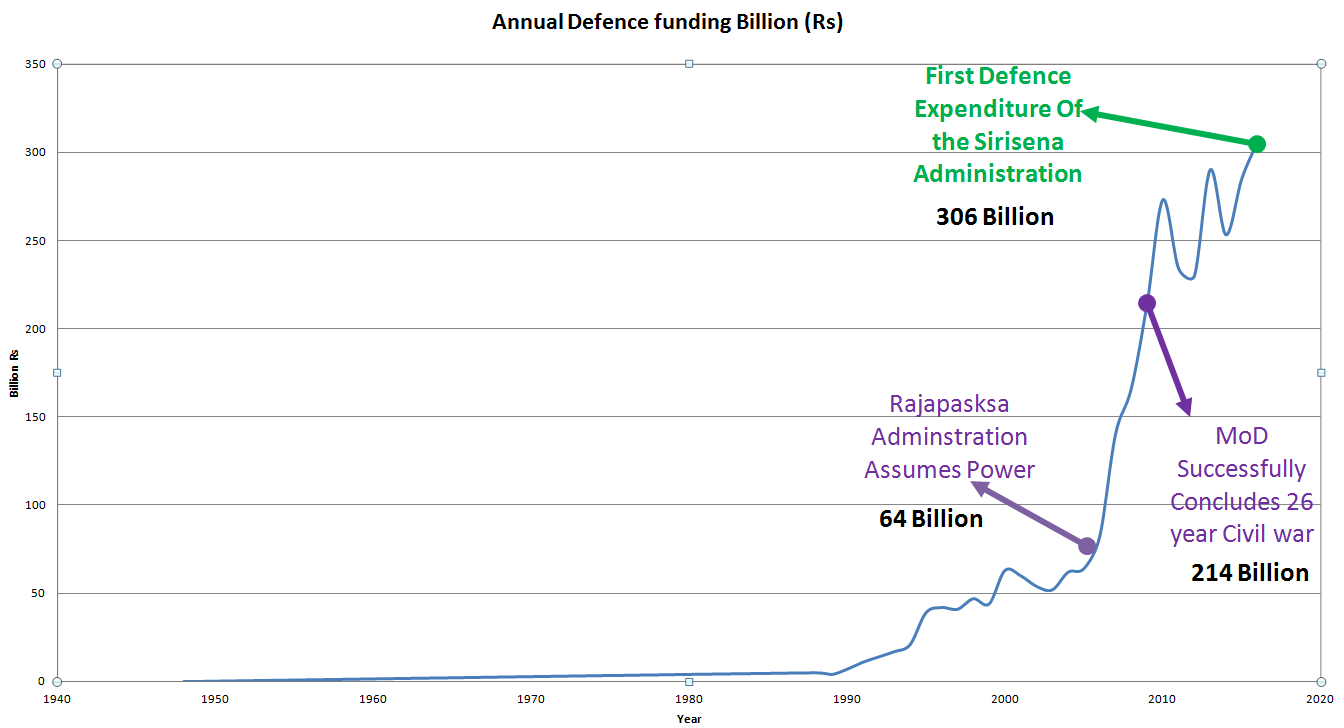
Sri Lanka defence budget, as at 2016

Year	Appropriated endowment (billions of Rs)	Supplementary funding (billions of Rs)	Cumulative expenditure (billions of Rs)
1996	42	–	160
2000	63	–	355
2005	64	–	647
2010	273	None	1,552
2011	214	20	1,756
2012	230	None	1,986
2013	290	None	2,276
2014	253	None	2,529
2015	285	None	2,814
2016	307	None	3,121
2017	243	None	3,364

Historically, Sri Lanka's defence budget has seen fluctuations. In 2022, military spending was $1.05 billion, a 38.14% decline from 2021, which stood at $1.70 billion. The 2025 allocation indicates a renewed emphasis on defence, possibly influenced by ongoing security concerns or strategic objectives. In 2023 Sri Lankan government spend $1.45 billion dollars(539 billion Sri Lankan rupees) 12% of GDP. This substantial defence expenditure occurs amidst efforts to recover from a severe financial crisis. Under an agreement with the International Monetary Fund (IMF), Sri Lanka aims to reduce its budget deficit to 5.2% of GDP in 2025, down from a target of 7.6% the previous year. Balancing high defence spending with fiscal consolidation and investments in other critical sectors like education presents a significant challenge for the government.

== Senior officials ==
- Minister of Defence – Anura Kumara Dissanayake
- State Minister of Defence – Vacant
- Permanent Secretary – Air vice-marshal Sampath Thuyacontha
- Chief of National Intelligence – General Ruwan Kulatunga

== Departments that come under the Ministry of Defence ==
- Sri Lanka Navy
- Sri Lanka Air Force
- State Intelligence Service
- Sri Lanka Coast Guard
- General Sir John Kotelawala Defence University
- Defence Services Command and Staff College
- National Cadet Corps
- Department of Immigration & Emigration
- Department of Registration of Persons
- Department of Civil Defence (formerly the Home Guard Service)
- The National Dangerous Drugs Control Board
- Ranaviru Seva Authority (Veteran's Welfare Authority)
- Centre for Research and Development

== Ministers attached to the Ministry of Defence ==
Since the establishment of the MoD in 1978 the portfolio of Minister of Defence was held by the President of Sri Lanka, except for a few brief periods . However a minister oversaw activities of the MoD and the armed forces. Incomplete

=== Minister of Defence ===
- Tilak Marapana – Minister of Defence

=== Minister of State for Defence ===
- Lalith Athulathmudali – Minister of National Security
- General Ranjan Wijeratne – Minister of State for Defence
- D.B Wijetunga – Minister of State for Defence
- Ruwan Wijewardene – State Minister of Defence

=== Deputy Minister of Defence ===
- Mrvyn Kularatne – Deputy Minister of Defence
- T.B. Werapitiya (former DIG) – Deputy Minister of Defence and Minister of Internal Security
- Anura Bastian – Deputy Minister of Defence
- General Anuruddha Ratwatte – Deputy Minister of Defence
- Ratnasiri Wickremanayake – Deputy Minister of Defence

== Secretaries ==
- Colonel C. A. Dharmapala (1 Sep 1977 – 15 August 1983)
- General Deshamanya D. S. Attygalle (15 Aug 1983 – 16 February 1990)
- General Cyril Ranatunga (16 Feb 1990 – 1 May 1993)
- Air Chief Marshal Walter Fernando (1 May 1993 – 6 June 1993)
- General Hamilton Wanasinghe (6 Jun 1993 – 10 February 1995)
- Chandananda de Silva (7 Dec 1995 – 5 December 2001)
- Austin Fernando (21 Dec 2001 – 3 November 2003)
- Cyril Herath (17 Apr 2004 – 30 November 2004)
- Major General Asoka Jayawardena (1 Dec 2004 – 25 November 2005)
- Lieutenant Colonel Gotabhaya Rajapaksa (25 Nov 2005 – 9 January 2015)
- B. M. U. D. Basnayake (11 Jan 2015 – 8 September 2015)
- Karunasena Hettiarachchi (9 Sep 2015 – 5 July 2017)
- Kapila Waidyaratne (4 Jul 2017 – 30 October 2018)
- Hemasiri Fernando (30 October 2018 – 25 April 2019)
- General Shantha Kottegoda (28 April 2019 – 18 November 2019)
- General Kamal Gunaratne (18 November 2019 – 23 September 2024)
- Air vice-marshal Sampath Thuyacontha (24 September 2024–present)

== See also ==
- Minister of Defence (Sri Lanka)
- Ministries of Sri Lanka
